= 1930 Tennessee gubernatorial election =

- November 4, 1930
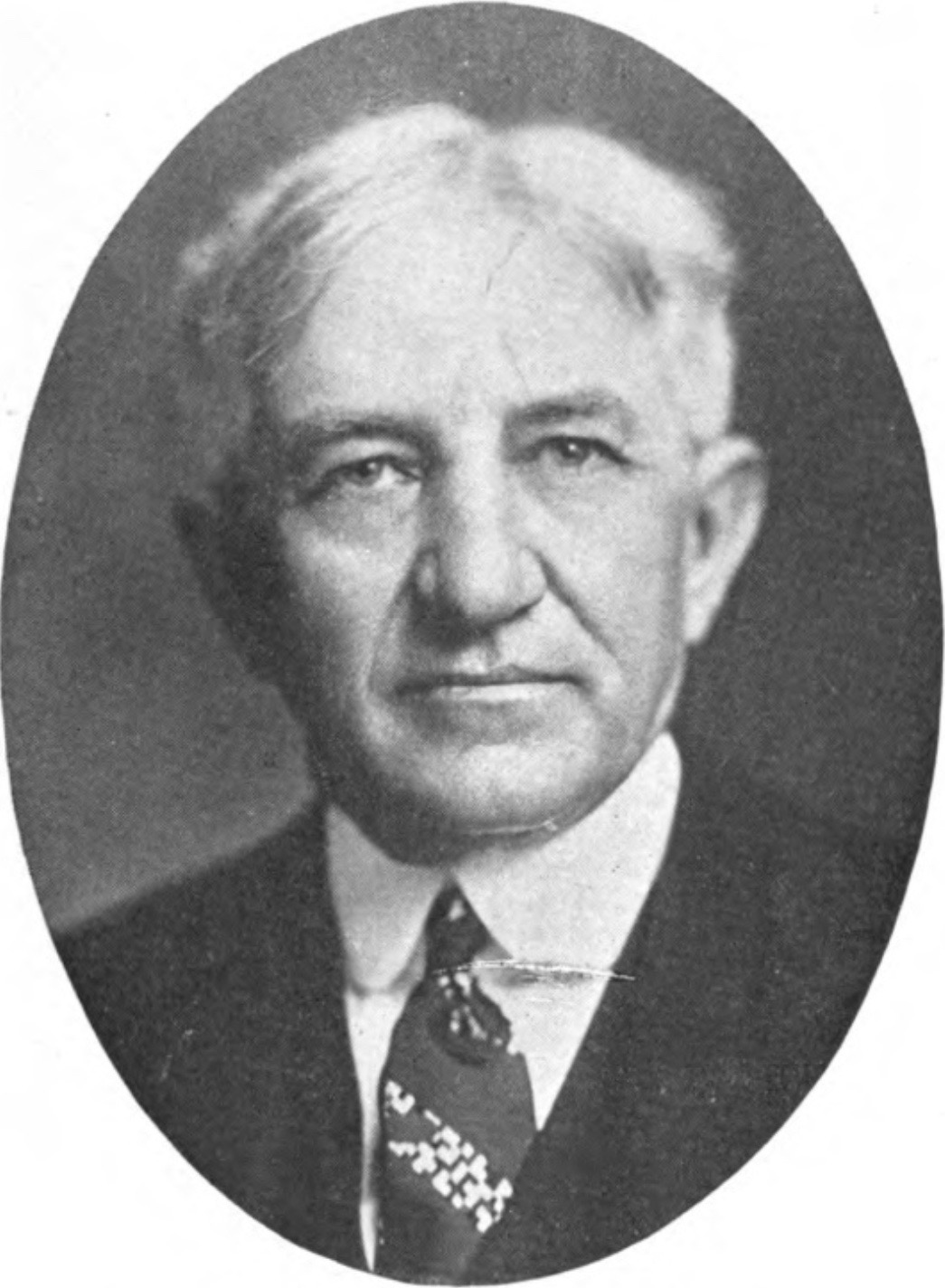

Nominee	Henry Hollis Horton	C. Arthur Bruce
Party	Democratic	Republican
Popular vote	153,341	85,558
Percentage	63.84%	35.62%
- County results Horton: 40–50% 50–60% 60–70% 70–80% 80–90% >90% Bruce: 50–60% 60–70%
Governor before election
Henry Hollis Horton
Democratic
Elected Governor
Henry Hollis Horton
Democratic

The 1930 Tennessee gubernatorial election was held on November 4, 1930. Incumbent Democratic governor Henry Hollis Horton defeated Republican nominee C. Arthur Bruce with 63.8% of the vote.

During Horton's second term, he and Luke Lea, the publisher of the Nashville Tennessean, began using state patronage to distribute jobs in Memphis in an attempt to weaken E. H. Crump's influence there. Crump, who was running for Congress and wanted to focus on his own campaign, agreed to support Horton in the 1930 governor's race if he and Lea would stop providing patronage to his foes. With Crump out of the way, Horton defeated his chief opponent, Lambert Estes Gwinn, in the Democratic primary. He went on to win the general election.

== Primary elections ==
Primary elections were held on August 7, 1930.

=== Democratic primary ===
==== Candidates ====
- Henry Hollis Horton, incumbent governor
- Lambert Estes Gwinn, former state senator

==== Results ====
Democratic primary results
Party	Candidate	Votes	%
Democratic	Henry Hollis Horton (incumbent)	144,990	58.87%
Democratic	Lambert Estes Gwinn	101,285	41.13%
Total votes		246,275	100.00%

== General election ==
=== Candidates ===
Major party candidates

- Henry Hollis Horton, Democratic
- C. Arthur Bruce, Republican

Other candidates

- Samuel Borenstein, Independent

=== Results ===
1930 Tennessee gubernatorial election
Party	Candidate	Votes	%	±%
Democratic	Henry Hollis Horton (incumbent)	153,341	63.84%	
Republican	C. Arthur Bruce	85,558	35.62%	
Independent	Samuel Borenstein	1,296	0.54%	
Majority		67,783		
Turnout				
Democratic hold		Swing		

== See also ==
- 1930 United States Senate elections in Tennessee
