= 1928 Tennessee gubernatorial election =

- November 6, 1928
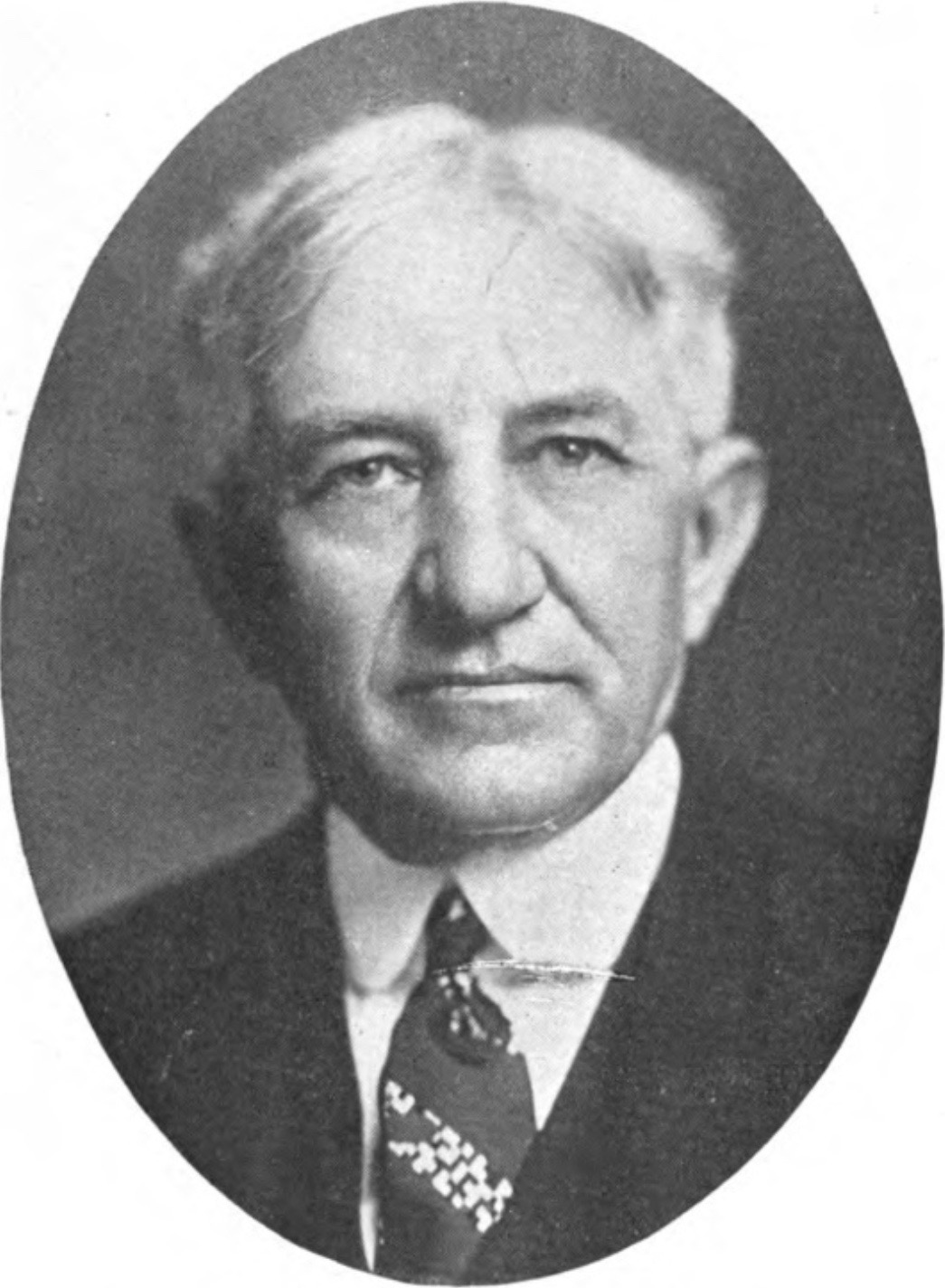

Nominee	Henry Hollis Horton	Raleigh Hopkins
Party	Democratic	Republican
Popular vote	195,546	124,733
Percentage	61.06%	38.95%
- County results Horton: 50–60% 60–70% 70–80% 80–90% >90% Hopkins: 50–60% 60–70% 70–80% 80–90%
Governor before election
Henry Hollis Horton
Democratic
Elected Governor
Henry Hollis Horton
Democratic

The 1928 Tennessee gubernatorial election was held on November 6, 1928. Incumbent Democratic governor Austin Peay died in office on October 2, 1927. Tennessee's Democratic Speaker of the Senate, Henry Hollis Horton became governor according to Tennessee's gubernatorial succession law. In the general election, Henry defeated Republican nominee Raleigh Hopkins with 61.1% of the vote.

In the primary election, Horton turned to Austin Peay's longtime adviser, Luke Lea, publisher of the Nashville Tennessean, to help him win re-election. Lea's rivals, Memphis political boss E. H. Crump and Nashville political boss Hilary Howse endorsed Hill McAlister, who had been defeated by Peay in 1926. A third candidate, Lewis S. Pope also sought the Democratic nomination and had the backing of Peay's widow. After a hard-fought primary campaign, Horton won the nomination with 97,333 votes to 92,017 for McAlister and 27,779 for Pope.

== Primary elections ==
Primary elections were held on August 2, 1928.

=== Democratic primary ===
==== Candidates ====
- Henry Hollis Horton, incumbent governor
- Hill McAlister, Tennessee State Treasurer
- Lewis S. Pope
- D. W. Dodson

==== Results ====
Democratic primary results
Party	Candidate	Votes	%
Democratic	Henry Hollis Horton (incumbent)	97,333	44.72%
Democratic	Hill McAlister	92,017	42.27%
Democratic	Lewis S. Pope	27,779	12.76%
Democratic	D. W. Dodson	543	0.25%
Total votes		217,672	100.00%

== General election ==
=== Candidates ===
- Henry Hollis Horton, Democratic
- Raleigh Hopkins, Republican

=== Results ===
1928 Tennessee gubernatorial election
Party	Candidate	Votes	%	±%
Democratic	Henry Hollis Horton (incumbent)	195,546	61.06%	
Republican	Raleigh Hopkins	124,733	38.95%	
Majority		70,813		
Turnout				
Democratic hold		Swing		

== See also ==
- 1928 United States presidential election in Tennessee
- 1928 United States Senate election in Tennessee
