= Lambert Estes Gwinn =

American politician (1884–1958)

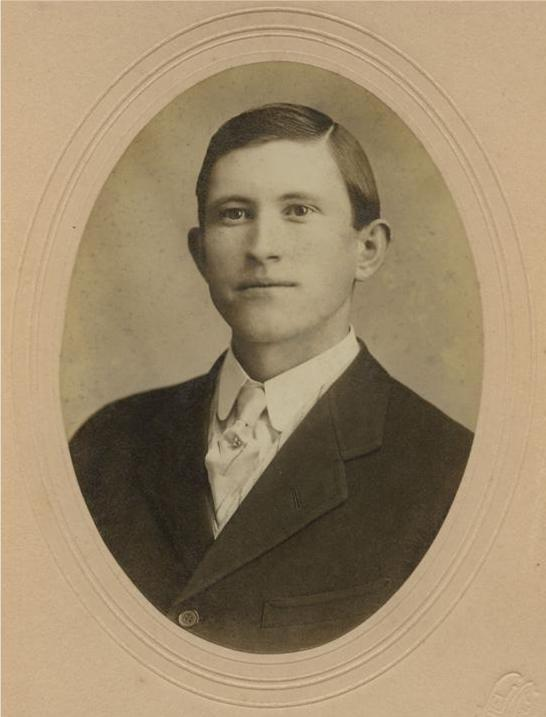
- Lambert Estes Gwinn, Tennessee State Senator, 1919-20.
- Born: February 19, 1884; Burlison, Tipton County, Tennessee
- Died: December 4, 1958 (aged 74); Memphis, Tennessee
- Occupations: educator, politician, and attorney
- Parent(s): Father: John Lawrence Jackson Gwinn; Mother: Kisa Dell Williams

Lambert Estes Gwinn (February 19, 1884 – December 4, 1958) was a Tennessee educator, politician, and attorney. He served as a state senator (1919–1921) and ran for governor in the Democratic primaries in 1922 and 1930. As a prominent criminal and appellate lawyer, he represented many clients before the Tennessee Supreme Court, the United States Circuit Court of Appeals, and the United States Supreme Court.

== Biography ==
Gwinn was born and raised in the rural community of Burlison in Tipton County, Tennessee, and attended a small public school near there. His formal education ended in 1900 when he became qualified as a teacher at 16 years old. Despite little formal education, he was a prodigious reader and possessed the determination for continued self-study. For the next 7 years, he taught in the Tipton County school system and also served as a principal. He left the ranks of teaching in 1907 to become editor/publisher of the Tipton Weekly Record; this position brought him into contact with many prominent people of the community and the state.

Gwinn studied law in the offices of Stephenson and Simonton in Covington, Tennessee, and passed the state bar examination to become a lawyer in 1909. In addition to his law practice, he served as: Tipton County School Superintendent (1911–17), president of the Tennessee Teachers Association (1917), president of the Covington Board of Education (1923), and member of the Tennessee Democratic Committee (1914–1920). During World War I, Gwinn was one of the 75 thousand "Four Minute Men", a group of volunteers who gave brief speeches supporting the war effort wherever and whenever they could get an audience. Gwinn's other business interests included being the president of Planters Bank of Atoka and on the board of directors of Union Savings Bank in Covington, Tennessee.

In 1918, Gwinn was elected as a state senator in the 61st General Assembly (1919–1920) representing Shelby and Tipton Counties. In 1922, he ran in the Democratic primaries against Austin Peay, former Governor Benton McMillin, and General Harvey H. Hannah. Peay won the primary election and ultimately defeated the sitting Governor Alfred Taylor, who was the last Republican governor of Tennessee for nearly 50 years.

Moving to Memphis in 1923, Gwinn became a strong supporter of Mayor Rowlett Paine, who served in opposition to the political machine led by "Boss" E. H. Crump. Paine lost the 1927 mayoral election to Watkins Overton, who represented the Crump machine, and this marked the resurgence of Crump's dominance in the politics of western Tennessee. In 1930, Gwinn ran in the Democratic gubernatorial primaries against the sitting Governor Henry Horton, who had the support of Caldwell-Lea political machine in Nashville. Gwinn was supported by two ex-governors, Benton McMillin and Albert H. Roberts, and by Hill McAlister. Crump, who had opposed Horton's election in 1928, threw his support behind Horton in the Democratic primaries of 1930. Horton won the primary election by 123,642 votes to Gwinn's 88,416. Shelby County made the difference, giving Horton 27,634 votes compared to Gwinn's 2,267. Virtually all statewide political contests in Tennessee during this era were resolved in the Democratic primaries rather than in the general elections. Crump had made a governor, but most remarkable was that over 20 thousand voters who had been against Horton in 1928 changed their minds at Crump's suggestion and voted for Horton in 1930.

After the 1930 election, Gwinn focused on his law practice. One of his more noteworthy cases involved Luke Lea's trial for bank fraud. Gwinn was well known for his love of practicing courtroom law, and he often represented needy clients pro bono.
