= George Creel =

American journalist and public servant (1876–1953)

George Edward Creel
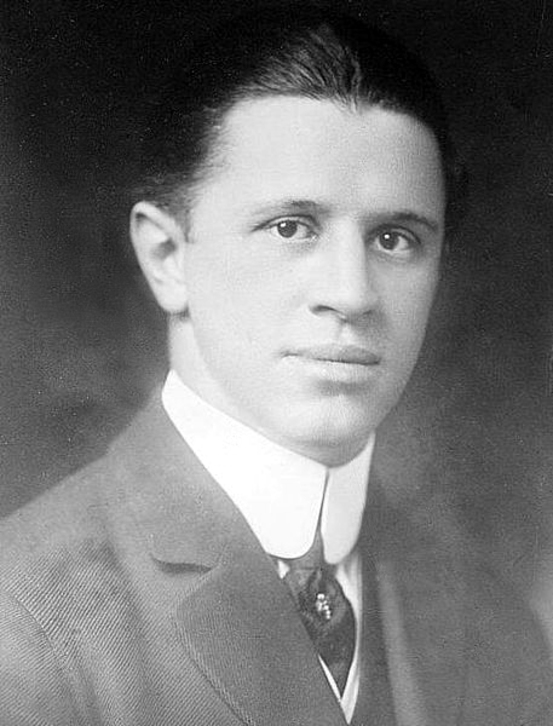
- Creel in 1917

Western Regional Director of the National Recovery Administration
- In office July 29, 1933 – April 25, 1934
- Appointed by: Franklin D. Roosevelt

Chairman of the Committee on Public Information
- In office April 13, 1917 – August 21, 1919
- Appointed by: Woodrow Wilson
- Preceded by: Position established
- Succeeded by: Position abolished

Personal details
- Born: December 1, 1876 Blackburn, Missouri, US
- Died: October 2, 1953 (aged 76) San Francisco, California, US
- Party: Democratic
- Spouse(s): Blanche Bates (m. 1912; died 1941) Alice May Rosseter (m. 1943)
- Children: George Jr.; Frances
- Occupation: Journalist

George Edward Creel (December 1, 1876 – October 2, 1953) was an American investigative journalist and writer, a politician and government official. He served as the head of the United States Committee on Public Information, a propaganda organization created by President Woodrow Wilson during World War I.

== Early life and education ==
Creel was born on December 1, 1876, in Blackburn, Missouri, to Henry Clay Creel and Virginia Fackler Creel, who had three sons, Wylie, George, and Richard Henry (Hal). His father came to Missouri from Parkersburg, Virginia, and bought land in Osage County, Missouri; he was college educated, and served in Virginia legislature. A captain of the Confederate States Army during the Civil War, he did not succeed in the Missouri post-war economy as a farmer and rancher and became an alcoholic. Virginia provided for the family by keeping a boarding house in Kansas City and by sewing and keeping a large garden in Odessa, Missouri. All her children became productive members of society: Wylie Creel, a businessman; George, a journalist and writer; and Richard, a doctor, who served as Assistant Surgeon General of the United States Public Health Service.

His alcoholic father did not leave as deep an impression on Creel as did his mother, who inspired his passion for women's suffrage. The family moved frequently around west-central Missouri in Creel's early years, living for a time in Wheatland, Hickory County, Missouri, then Kansas City before finally settling in Odessa, Missouri, in 1888. He often said that, "I knew my mother had more character, brains, and competence than any man that ever lived." His mother also encouraged his love for literature. Although Creel did not receive much formal education, as his mother pulled him out of school system, and was mainly home-schooled, he credited his mother for his fair knowledge of history and literature including classics, such as the Iliad. In 1891, the then fifteen-year-old Creel ran away from home for a year, supporting himself by working at a succession of county fairs across Missouri and at odd jobs when available. Despite his resistance and rebellion, Creel did manage to receive some formal schooling, while attending Kansas City Central High School, Odessa High School, and Odessa College for one year in Odessa, Missouri. He said of himself that "an open mind is not part of my inheritance. I took in prejudices with mother's milk and was weaned on partisanship."

== Career ==
=== Early career ===
In 1896, he began his first formal job at the Kansas City World. He was hired for $4 a week, starting as a reporter, but eventually moved up to write feature articles. He also wrote a book review column and covered social happenings. He was eventually fired because he felt it was wrong to discuss a wealthy man's daughter eloping with her coachman in the paper and apparently his editors didn't agree.

After his termination, he was given a free train pass to Chicago by a well-wisher, and then hopped a cattle train to New York earning his fare by tending stock. He found an opportunity to work as a free-lance joke writer for William Randolph Hearst and Joseph Pulitzer's comic supplements. As a 1913 Collier's profile put it, he was "shutting himself in his cheap room in a mechanics' hotel; he ground out jokes by the dozens, by the hundreds, jokes in bales and jokes in bundles." But he didn't sell any his first month and survived by shoveling snow. Soon, he sold four jokes to Hearst's Evening Journal and became a regular with many periodicals.

On March 11, 1899, he went back to Kansas City with his friend, Arthur Grissom, a poet, who married into rich Kansas family, to start a newspaper, The Independent. After only ten months, however, Grissom withdrew from the partnership. At age 23, Creel became the sole owner, editor, and publisher of The Independent. In the paper he dealt with many social issues including women's suffrage, single tax system, and public ownership of utilities. He was also a strong supporter of the Democratic Party and aggressively fought the policies and practices of Thomas Pendergast. Creel was not afraid to put politics or party affiliation aside for the greater public good, however. He backed Democrat Joseph W. Folk in a successful run for Missouri Governor in 1904. Then, in 1908, Creel came out in support of Republican Herbert S. Hadley and his gubernatorial campaign. Hadley, an ardent reformer like Folk before him, was the first Republican elected Governor of Missouri in nearly forty years. Said Creel in one of his newspaper editorials regarding party affiliations, "When a man becomes so besotted with partisan prejudice as to exalt party above the interest of the community, state or county, that moment he ceases to be a good citizen."

In late 1909, Creel left Kansas City and the Independent behind for a new political battlefield in Colorado. Reformer John F. Shafroth, a native of Fayette, Missouri, and an acquaintance of Creel's, had been elected Colorado's governor in 1908. Despite the Independent being profitable, he chose to give the newspaper away to a pair of young women who aspired to be newspaper publishers. Leaving Kansas City with just fifty dollars to his name, Creel soon found employment as an editorial writer for the Denver Post. He gained national publicity by calling for the lynching of 11 senators who opposed the public ownership of Denver's water company. He resigned promptly after and had a brief stint working at William Randolph Hearst's Cosmopolitan. He moved on to write editorials for The Rocky Mountain News (1911–1912) where he was a strong supporter of Woodrow Wilson.

In June 1912, Creel was appointed Police Commissioner of Denver by the recently elected reform mayor, Henry J. Arnold. Creel immediately used the office to launch several ambitious reform campaigns, such as ordering police officers to give up their clubs and nightsticks, as well as a campaign to destroy the red-light district in downtown Denver, while providing a tax-funded rehabilitation farm for women leaving prostitution. His time as police commissioner ended after he began pushing the Mayor Henry Arnold to live up to campaign promises. Although he was dismissed by the mayor for the creation of dissension, he was lauded nationally for his watchdog efforts.

Then in 1916, he became heavily involved in President Wilson's re-election campaign. Working under Bob Wooley, the Publicity Head for the Democratic National Committee, Creel wrote newspaper features and interviewed various people. In March 1917, Creel discovered that many of the military leaders wanted strong censorship of any criticism of the war. Creel sent President Wilson a brief in which he argued for "expression, not suppression" of the press. Wilson approved Creel's proposal and appointed him as chairman of the Committee on Public Information.

=== Committee on Public Information ===
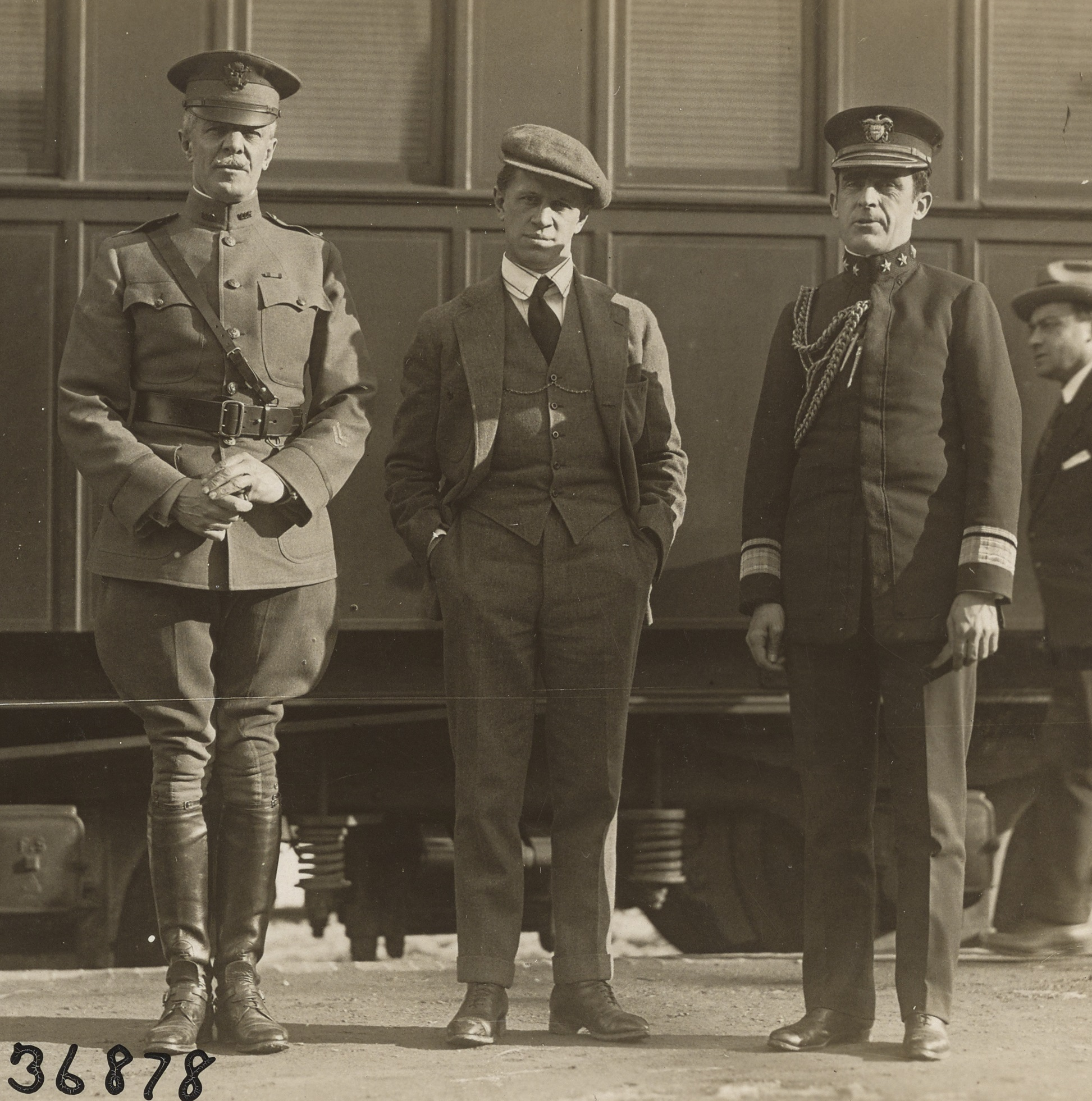
George Creel with General William Wright Harts and Admiral Cary Grayson in front of the presidential train in January 1919.

Seven days after the United States entered World War I in April 1917, Woodrow Wilson created the Committee on Public Information, a propaganda agency acting to release government news, to sustain morale in the US, to administer voluntary press censorship, and to develop propaganda abroad. George Creel was named the head of the committee, and he created 37 distinct divisions, most notably the Division of Pictorial Publicity, the Four Minute Men Division, the News Division, and the Censorship Board.

Documentary on the official American film cameramen in World War I

The Division of Pictorial Publicity was staffed by hundreds of the nation's most talented artists, and they created over 1000 designs for paintings, posters, cartoons, and sculptures that instilled patriotism, fear, and interest in the war efforts. Creel himself said that the images were "something that caught even the most indifferent eye." Through the Four Minute Men division, roughly 75,000 civilian volunteers spoke to 314 million people over the span of 18 months on topics assigned by the CPI, like the draft, rationing, bond drives, and victory gardens. These civilian volunteers spoke at social events in places like movie theaters and fellowship halls for four minutes, which was the time it took to change a movie reel and the time believed to be a human's attention span. The guidelines set forth by Creel directed the volunteers to fill their speeches with facts and appeals to emotions to bolster public support for the war efforts. Between the News Division and Censorship Committee, Creel and the CPI were able to control the flow of official war information. Creel sought to portray facts without bias, though most pieces of news were "colored by nationalistic assumptions." Creel's committee may have produced biased news, but it was his hope that the US could avoid rigid censorship during the war, as Creel's views on censorship were "expression, not repression." Under Creel's direction, the CPI sought only to repress material that contained "dangerous" or "unfavorable" ideas to avoid demoralizing the population.

All activities of the CPI ceased on November 11, 1918, upon the signing of the Armistice with Germany. The efforts of the CPI were regarded as the greatest public relations effort in history, up to its time. Such a massive, offensive, and multifaceted campaign had never been undertaken before, and the CPI brought to light the power of mass persuasion and social influence at a national level – realizations that had a profound effect on the field of public relations. Many of the 20th century's most influential public relations practitioners were trained under Creel on the committee, including Edward Bernays and Carl R. Byoir.

According to historian David F. Trask, all of Creel's strengths proved useful at CPI, especially "his predilection for Wilsonian reform abroad as well as at home, his personal magnetism, his taste for controversy, his tendency to attribute evil rather than misjudgment to those who criticized him." Trask continues:

As an administrator Creel was extraordinarily energetic, quick to make decisions, often impulsive. He was capable of inspiring strong devotion....Wilson seems to have held Creel in high regard, probably because of his unbending personal loyalty to the president as well as his effective methods of purveying administrative dogma.

=== Post-war career ===
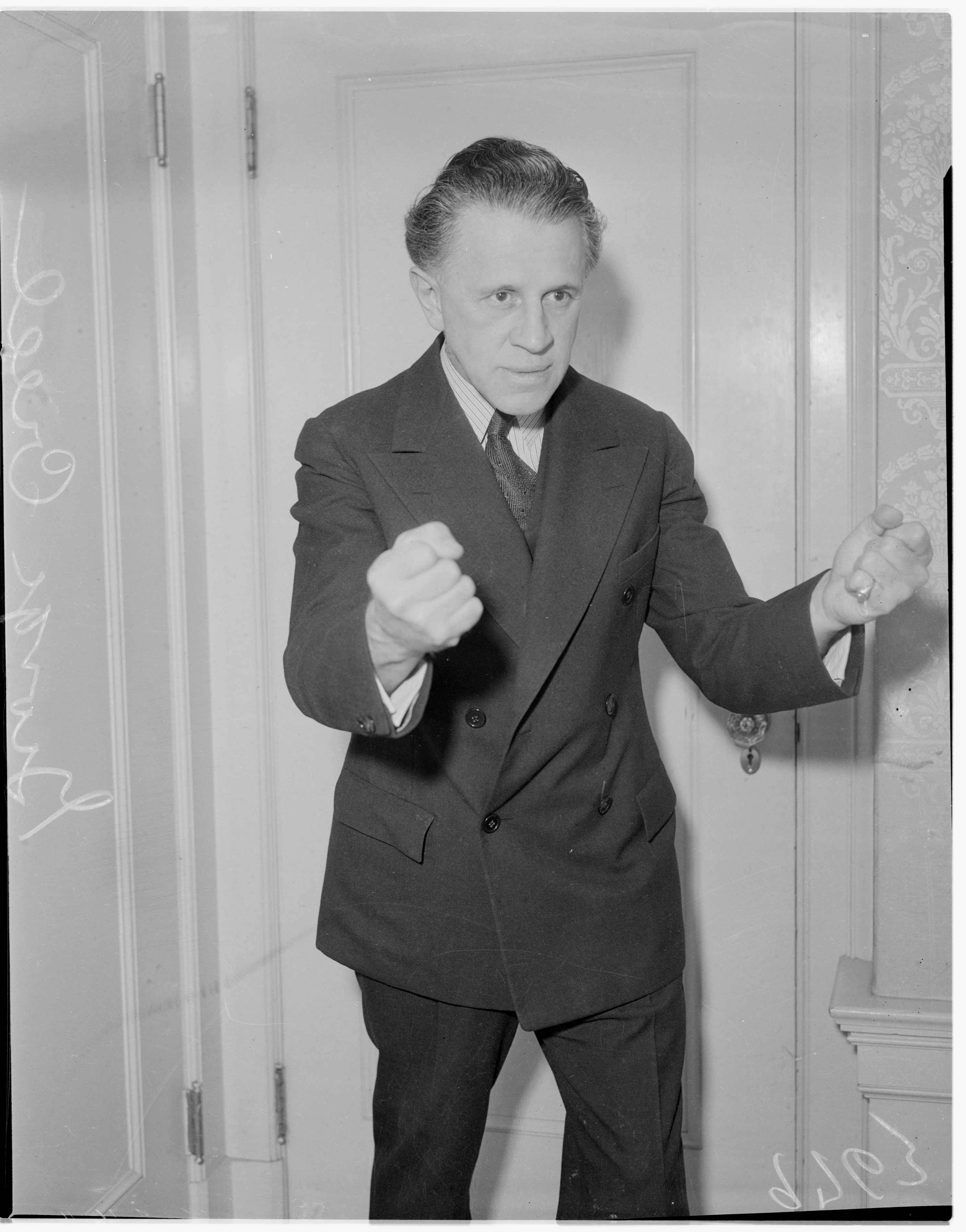
Creel in 1934

After his prolific career as the chairman of the CPI, Creel joined Collier's magazine as a feature writer, until he retired in the late 1940s. In 1926, he moved to San Francisco and eventually chaired the Regional Labor Board (1933) for California, Utah, and Nevada.

He was an active member of the Democratic Party and ran against the left-wing novelist Upton Sinclair in the 1934 California gubernatorial election. Sinclair defeated Creel in the Democratic primary, but lost in the general election.

== Personal life ==
Creel was married to actress Blanche Bates from 1912 until her death in 1941. The couple had two children, a son named George Jr. and a daughter named Frances. In 1943, he married Alice May Rosseter. During the last years of his life Creel resided in San Francisco until he died on October 2, 1953, at age 76.

== Works ==
Creel was the author of an extensive collection of writings. Some of his writing and books include:

=== Articles ===
- "Rockefeller Law." The Masses, vol. 6, no. 10, iss. 50 (Jul. 1916), pp. 5–6. Full issue.
- "The Fight for Public Opinion." Scientific American, vol. 118, no. 14 (Apr. 6, 1918), p. 298. JSTOR 26031217. Full issue.

=== Books ===
- Quatrains of Christ. Preface by Julian Hawthorne. Kansas City: The Independent Press (1907). OCLC 11981007.
- Children in Bondage, with Edwin Markham & B. B. Lindsey (1913).
- Wilson and the Issues (1916).
- Ireland's Fight for Freedom (1919).
- How We Advertised America (1920). OCLC 1540684
- The War, the World and Wilson (1920).
- Uncle Henry (1923).
- The People Next Door: An Interpretive History of Mexico and the Mexicans. New York: John Day Company (1926).
- Sons of the Eagle: Soaring Figures of America's Past. Indianapolis: Bobbs-Merrill Company (1927).
- Sam Houston: Colossus in Buckskin (1928). OCLC 1109698.
- Tom Paine Liberty Bell. New York: Sears Pub. Co. (1932). OCLC 1981450.
- War Criminals and Punishment (1944). OCLC 274309.
- Rebel at Large: Recollections of Fifty Crowded Years. New York: G.P. Putnam's Sons (1947). OCLC 456631.
- Russia's Race for Asia. Indianapolis: Bobbs-Merrill (1949). OCLC 1609519.
