= William King McAlister =

American judge (1850–1923)

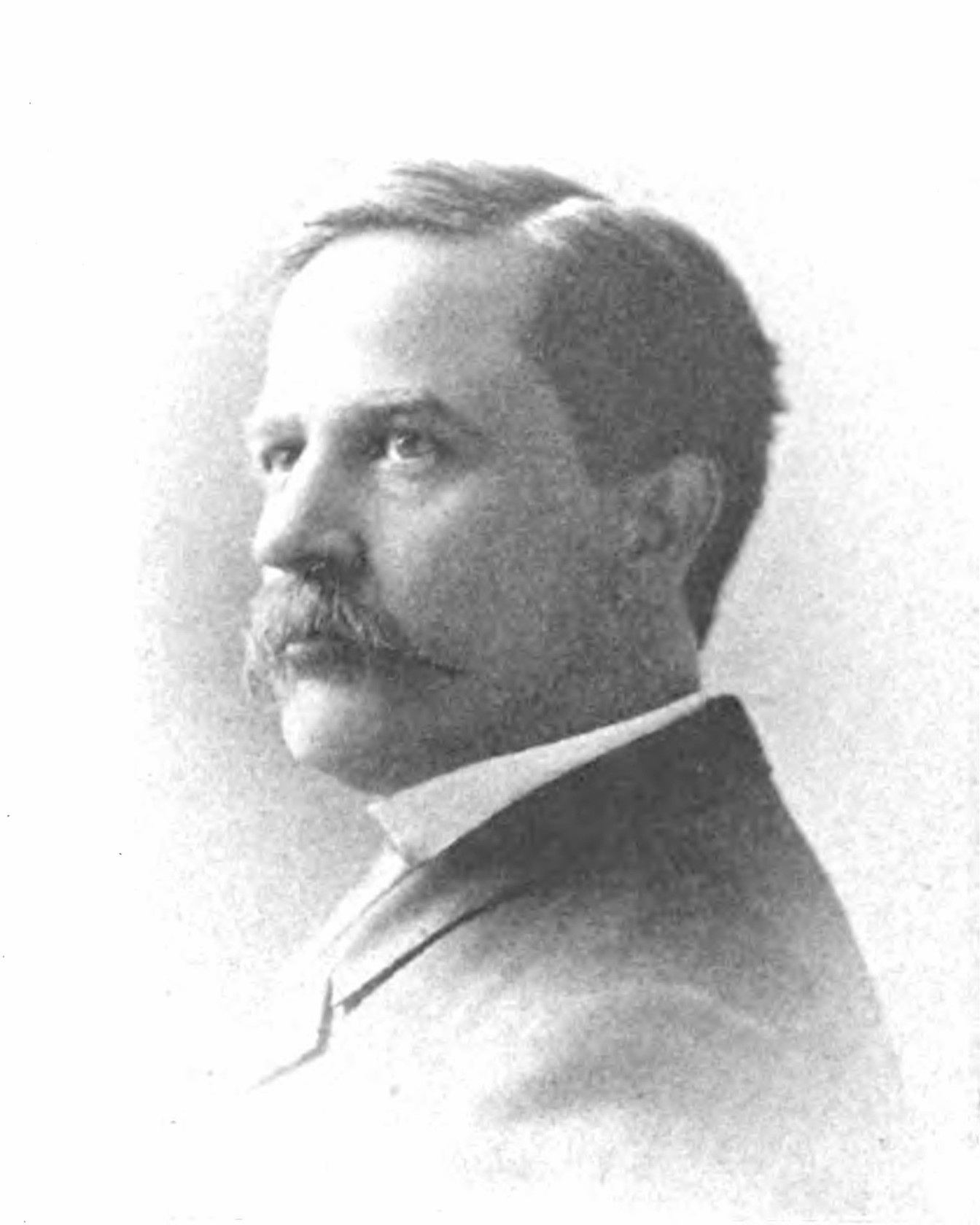
William K. McAlister Jr.

William King McAlister Jr. (July 4, 1850 – May 16, 1923) was an associate justice of the Tennessee Supreme Court from 1893 to 1910. He was appointed by Tennessee governor Peter Turney on April 1, 1893 to fill the vacancy caused by the resignation of Horace H. Lurton. He was elected in 1894 and 1902, serving until 1910.

McAlister was born in Nashville, and attended Bethany College in West Virginia, enrolling at the age of 15. After graduating with a Bachelor of Arts degree in June 1869, he studied in the law department at the University of Nashville, earning a Bachelor of Laws degree in June 1871.

McAlister served as city attorney of Nashville from 1875 to 1883. He was circuit judge of Seventh Circuit from 1886 to 1893. After leaving the Tennessee Supreme Court in 1910, he taught law at Vanderbilt University from 1910 until his death in Nashville.

His son Hill McAlister went on to become governor of Tennessee.

Political offices
Preceded by Horace Harmon Lurton	Justice of the Tennessee Supreme Court; 1893–1910	Succeeded by Court reconstituted
