= Phebe Temperance Sutliff =

American historian and economist

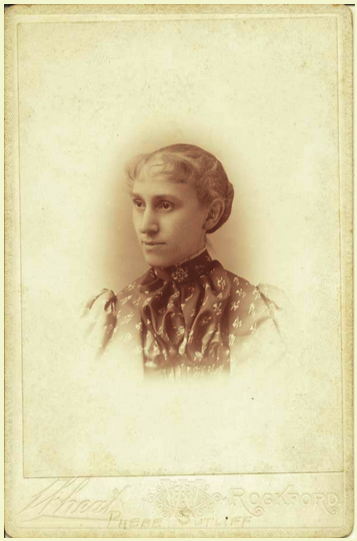
- Born: January 16, 1859; Warren, Ohio, U.S.
- Died: July 25, 1955 (aged 96); Warren, Ohio
- Occupations: educator; executive
- Known for: President, Rockford College

Academic background
- Education: Vassar College, A.B.; Cornell University, A.M.

Academic work
- Discipline: History and economics
- Sub-discipline: American Constitutional Law and History
- Institutions: Hiram College; Rockford College
- Main interests: Historical and economic problems

Phebe Temperance Sutliff (1859–1955) was an American educator who served as president of Rockford College in Illinois. Her life was devoted to scholarship, particularly investigation of historical and economic problems.

== Early life and education ==
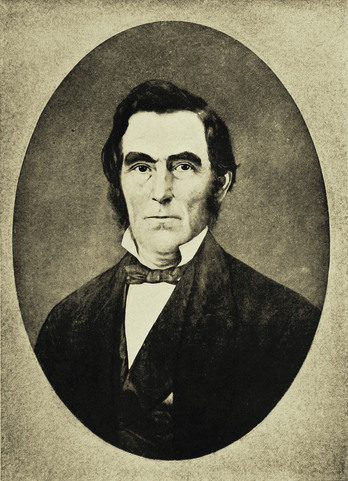
Levi Sutliff

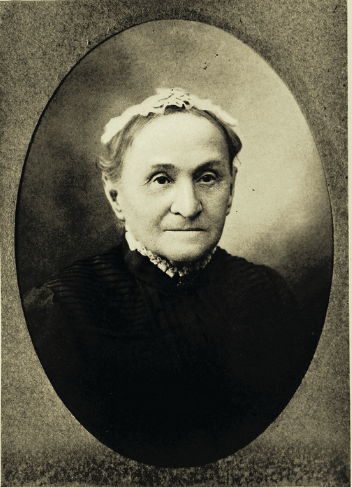
Phebe Lord Marvin Sutliff

Phebe Temperance Sutliff was born in Warren, Ohio, January 16, 1859. Her parents were Levi (1805–1864) and Phebe Lord (Marvin) Sutliff. She was a granddaughter of Samuel and Ruth (Granger) Sutliff and of Joseph and Temperance (Miller) Marvin, and a descendant of Reinold Marvin, who left England in 1635, and settled in Hartford, Connecticut. Western Reserve settlers were on both sides of her family.

She was graduated from Vassar College, A.B., 1880.

Returning to school, she was a post-graduate student at Cornell University, 1889–90, receiving the degree of A.M., in the latter year. She then studied at the University of Zurich and Swiss Polytechnic Institute, 1890–91.

At the University of Chicago in 1895, she was a student of American Constitutional Law and History, under Professor Von Holst.

== Career ==
In 1855–86, at Hiram College, Ohio, she served as lady principal and teacher.

In 1887–89, she was head of the department of history and English literature, Rockford Female Seminary, Illinois.

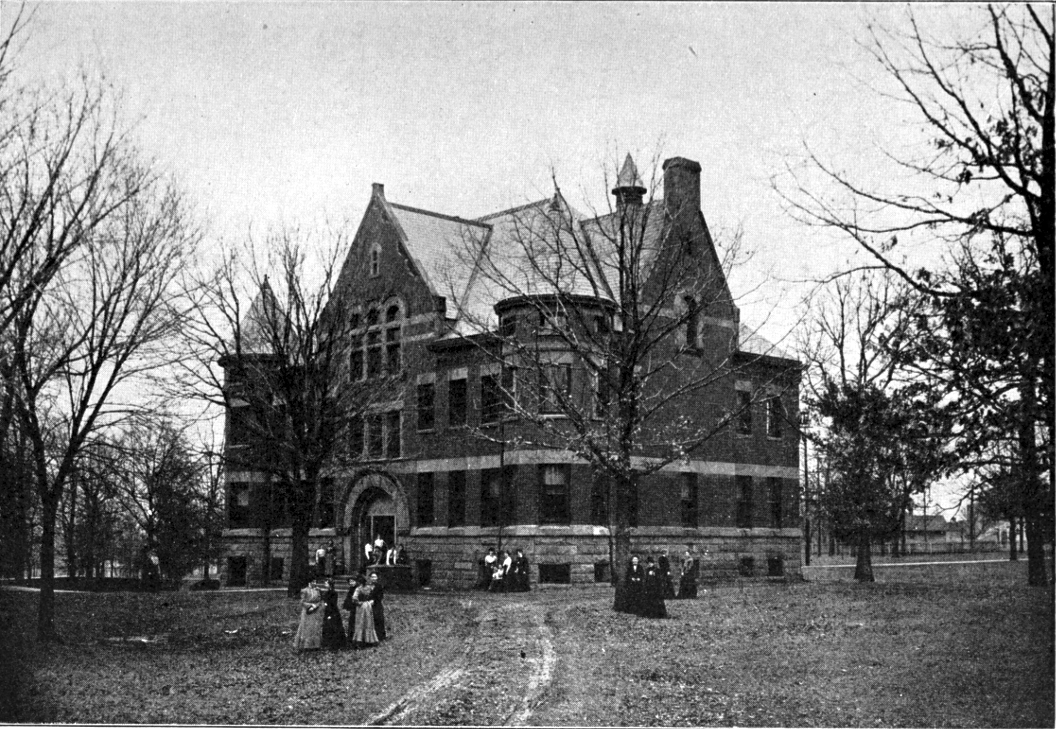
Rockford College (1904)

Returning from Europe, she was head of the department of history and economics at Rockford college, Illinois, 1892–96.

From 1896, she served as the head of the department of modern European and United States history at Rockford College. In the same year, she became its president, resigning in 1901 and returning to Warren, Ohio, in order to devote her entire time to research work, and to care for her aged mother.

During World War I and the reconstruction period, she served as one of the "Four Minute Men" in the Liberty Loan and Thrift Savings Stamp campaigns. With several other volunteer workers, she started an evening school for foreigners, and continued it as a volunteer enterprise until the practical demonstration of its benefits caused the Board of Education to take it over and make it an integral part of the public school system. She gave several courses of lectures on the war and both spoke and wrote in favor of a "League to Enforce Peace." Sutliff was president of the local Child Labor League as long as the organization was maintained. In 1920, she was appointed a member of the Ohio State Democratic Committee, and was one of the committee's campaign lecturers.

For eighteen years, she served as the chair of the Warren Public Library board of trustees.

She was made a member of the American Historical Association, and the American Academy of Political and Social Science, as well as the Societe Academique d'Histoire Internationale, American Society for Judicial Settlement of International Disputes, and the League to Enforce Peace. She is a Phi Beta Kappa. Sutliff served as Trumbull County chair of the Historical Commission of Ohio.

== Death ==
She died in Warren, Ohio on July 25, 1955.
