= Henry Hollis Horton =

American politician (1866–1934)

Henry H. Horton
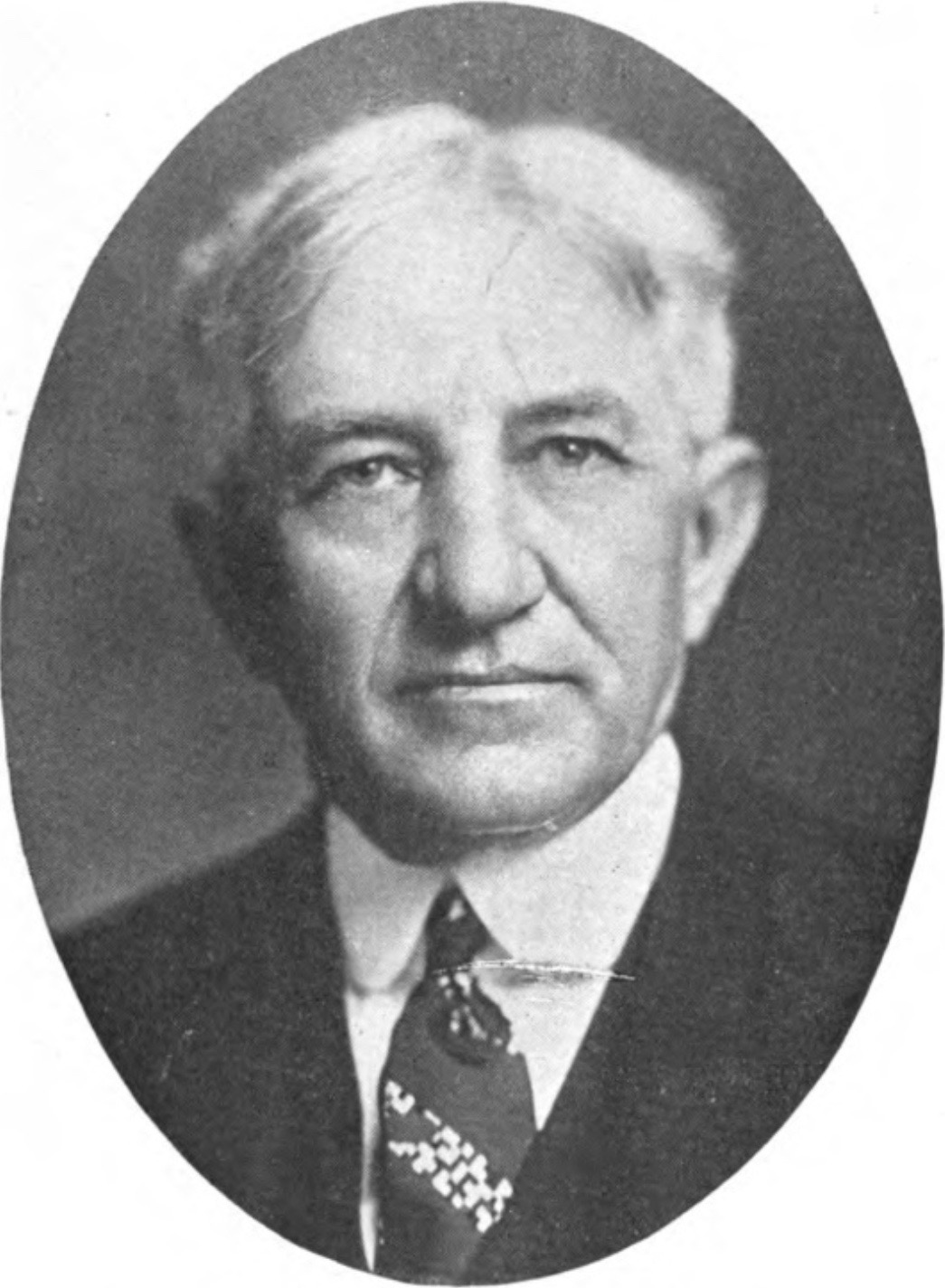

36th Governor of Tennessee
- In office October 3, 1927 – January 17, 1933
- Preceded by: Austin Peay
- Succeeded by: Hill McAlister

Speaker of the Tennessee Senate
- In office 1927
- Preceded by: Lucius D. Hill
- Succeeded by: Sam R. Bratton

Personal details
- Born: February 17, 1866 Princeton, Alabama, U.S.
- Died: July 2, 1934 (aged 68) Marshall County, Tennessee, U.S.
- Party: Democratic
- Spouse: Adeline Wilhoite (m. 1896)
- Profession: Attorney at law

Henry Hollis Horton (February 17, 1866 – July 2, 1934) was an American attorney, farmer and politician who served as the 36th governor of Tennessee from 1927 to 1933. He was elevated to the position when Governor Austin Peay died in office, and as Speaker of the Tennessee Senate, he was first in the line of succession. He was subsequently elected to two more two-year terms.

Horton's tenure as governor was marred by a scandal after the Stock Market crash in 1929. The related collapse of the financial empires of his political allies, Luke Lea and Rogers Caldwell, cost the state more than $6 million in funds deposited in their banks by Horton's administration. The legislature held a vote on impeaching the governor, but the measure did not carry and he served out his term. He retired from politics and returned to his farm in Marshall County.

== Early life ==
Horton was born in 1866 in the Princeton community of Jackson County, Alabama, one of 12 children of Henry Hollis Horton, a Baptist minister, and Anne (Moore) Horton. He attended Scottsboro Academy in Scottsboro, Alabama, before graduating from Winchester College in Winchester, Tennessee, in 1888. He moved to Hillsboro, Texas to teach school, but returned to Tennessee after about a year. He attended the University of the South in Sewanee in the early 1890s to study law.

Horton was admitted to the bar in 1894, and practiced law in Franklin County. He held various local offices, including school director and election commissioner, and worked as director of the Home Bank of Winchester.

== Marriage and family ==
Horton married Adeline Wilhoite in 1896. They had one son.

== Early political career ==
Horton was elected to represent Franklin County for one term in the Tennessee House of Representatives, from 1907 to 1909. He was a supporter of prohibition.

In 1911, Horton and his family moved to Marshall County, Tennessee. He operated a farm and mill that had been established by his in-laws, the Wilhoites, on the Duck River near Chapel Hill.

== Governor ==
Horton was elected to the Tennessee Senate in 1926 for the district of Marshall and Lincoln counties. He served as Speaker of the Senate from 1926 to 1927. When Governor Austin Peay died in office on October 2, 1927, Horton became governor according to Tennessee's gubernatorial succession law.

Unfamiliar with running a statewide campaign, Horton turned to Peay's longtime adviser, Luke Lea, publisher of the Nashville Tennessean, to help him win reelection in 1928. Lea's rivals, Memphis political boss E. H. Crump and Nashville political boss Hilary Howse, endorsed Hill McAlister, who had been defeated by Peay in 1926. A third candidate, Lewis S. Pope, also sought the Democratic nomination, and had the backing of Peay's widow. After a hard-fought primary campaign, Horton won the nomination with 97,333 votes to 92,017 for McAlister, and 27,779 for Pope. In the general election, he defeated the Republican candidate, Raleigh Hopkins, 195,546 votes to 124,733.

During Horton's second term, he and Lea began using state patronage to distribute jobs in Memphis in an attempt to weaken Crump's influence there. Crump, who was running for Congress and wanted to focus on his own campaign, agreed to support Horton in the 1930 governor's race if he and Lea would stop providing patronage to his foes. With Crump out of the way, Horton defeated his chief opponent, Lambert Estes Gwinn in the Democratic primary. He defeated C. Arthur Bruce in the general election.

Four days after Horton was reelected governor, the Bank of Tennessee, owned by Lea associate Rogers Caldwell, was declared insolvent following the stock market crash in 1929, and Caldwell's banks throughout the South soon followed. Horton had deposited more than $6 million in state funds in Caldwell's banks, all of which was lost.

A Tennessee General Assembly investigation produced charges that Horton had conspired with Lea and Caldwell to run branches of state government for their own financial gain in exchange for Lea's political support. Crump and his allies assailed Horton for depositing state funds in the banks of his political allies. They also attacked Horton for awarding no-bid contracts to Caldwell's road-paving company, Kyrock. A motion calling for Horton's impeachment was voted on by the state House in June 1931, but the motion failed, 58 to 41. Horton finished his term and did not seek reelection.

During Horton's tenure as governor, he continued most of Peay's reform initiatives. He abolished a land tax that had been unpopular with farmers, established a parole board, created a state division of aeronautics, and developed a secondary state highway system. He supported statues of Andrew Jackson and John Sevier being placed in Statuary Hall in Washington, D.C.

== Later life and legacy ==
Following his final term as governor, Horton retired to his farm in Marshall County. He died from an apparent stroke on July 2, 1934. He was buried in Lewisburg, Tennessee.

In 1961, the state purchased Horton's Marshall County farm from his heirs. It adapted the land for use as Henry Horton State Park, dedicated to his memory. The ruins of a mill operated by Horton and his in-laws, the Wilhoites, still stand in the park.

A portion of U.S. Route 31 in Marshall County has been named in Horton's honor.

== See also ==
- List of governors of Tennessee

Party political offices
Preceded by Austin Peay	Democratic nominee for Governor of Tennessee; 1928, 1930	Succeeded by Hill McAlister
Political offices
Preceded by L. D. Hill	Lieutenant Governor of Tennessee; 1927	Succeeded by Sam R. Bratton
Preceded by Austin Peay	Governor of Tennessee; 1927–1933	Succeeded by Hill McAlister
