= 1928 United States Senate election in Tennessee =

- November 6, 1928
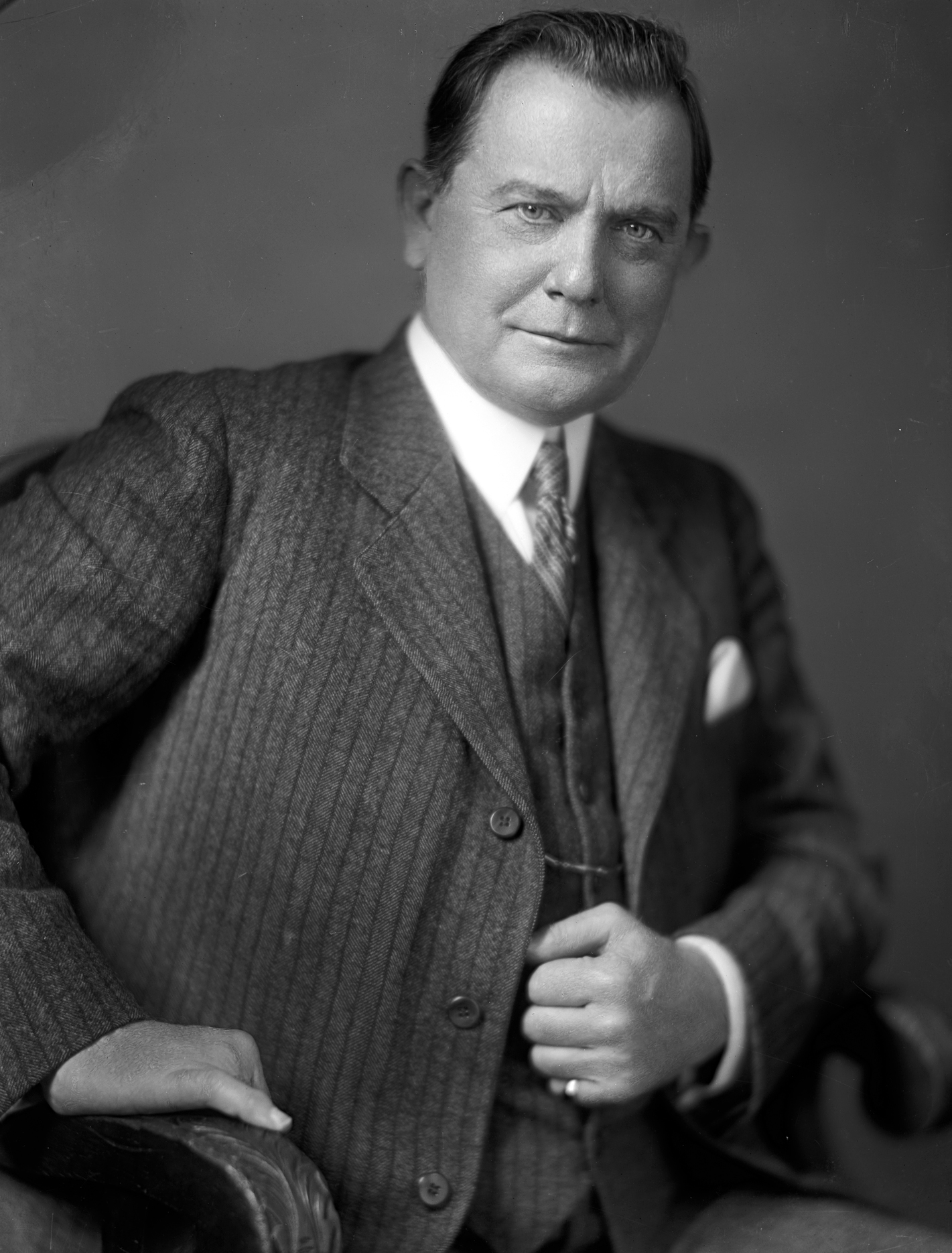

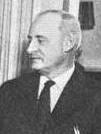
Nominee	Kenneth McKellar	James A. Fowler
Party	Democratic	Republican
Popular vote	175,431	120,289
Percentage	59.32%	40.68%
- McKellar: 50–60% 60–70% 70–80% 80–90% >90% Fowler: 50–60% 60–70% 70–80% 80–90%
U.S. senator before election
Kenneth McKellar
Democratic
Elected U.S. senator
Kenneth McKellar
Democratic

The 1928 United States Senate election in Tennessee was held on November 6, 1928. Incumbent Democratic Senator Kenneth McKellar was re-elected to a third term in office, defeating Republican Mayor of Knoxville James A. Fowler.

== Democratic primary ==
=== Candidates ===
- George L. Casey
- Finis James Garrett, U.S. Representative from Weakley County and House Minority Leader
- Kenneth McKellar, incumbent Senator since 1917
- John Randolph Neal Jr., attorney, academic, and perennial candidate for Governor

=== Results ===
1928 Democratic Senate primary
Party	Candidate	Votes	%
Democratic	Kenneth McKellar (incumbent)	120,298	63.25%
Democratic	Finis James Garrett	64,470	33.90%
Democratic	John Randolph Neal Jr.	3,510	1.85%
Democratic	George L. Casey	1,908	1.00%
Total votes		190,186	100.00%

== General election ==
=== Candidates ===
- James Alexander Fowler, Mayor of Knoxville (Republican)
- Kenneth McKellar, incumbent Senator since 1917 (Democratic)

=== Results ===
1928 U.S. Senate election in Tennessee
Party	Candidate	Votes	%	±%
Democratic	Kenneth McKellar (incumbent)	175,431	59.32%	▼8.71
Republican	James Alexander Fowler	120,289	40.68%	▲8.71
Total votes		295,720	100.00%	N/A
Democratic hold				

== See also ==
- 1928 United States presidential election in Tennessee
- 1928 Tennessee gubernatorial election
- 1928 United States Senate elections
