= 1928 United States presidential election in Tennessee =

- November 6, 1928

All 12 Tennessee votes to the Electoral College

Nominee	Herbert Hoover	Al Smith
Party	Republican	Democratic
Home state	California	New York
Running mate	Charles Curtis	Joseph Taylor Robinson
Electoral vote	12	0
Popular vote	195,388	167,343
Percentage	53.76%	46.04%
County results
Hoover
50–60%
60–70%
70–80%
80–90%
90–100%
Smith
50–60%
60–70%
70–80%
80–90%
90–100%
President before election
Calvin Coolidge
Republican
Elected President
Herbert Hoover
Republican

The 1928 United States presidential election in Tennessee took place on November 6, 1928, as part of the 1928 United States presidential election. Tennessee voters chose 12 representatives, or electors, to the Electoral College, who voted for president and vice president.

For over a century after the Civil War, Tennessee was divided according to political loyalties established in that war. Unionist regions covering almost all of East Tennessee, Kentucky Pennyroyal-allied Macon County, and the five West Tennessee Highland Rim counties of Carroll, Henderson, McNairy, Hardin and Wayne voted Republican – generally by landslide margins – as they saw the Democratic Party as the "war party" who had forced them into a war they did not wish to fight. Contrariwise, the rest of Middle and West Tennessee who had supported and driven the state's secession was equally fiercely Democratic as it associated the Republicans with Reconstruction. After the disfranchisement of the state's African-American population by a poll tax was largely complete in the 1890s, the Democratic Party was certain of winning statewide elections if united, although unlike the Deep South Republicans would almost always gain thirty to forty percent of the statewide vote from mountain and Highland Rim support. When the Democratic Party was bitterly divided, the Republicans did win the governorship in 1910 and 1912, but did not gain at other levels.

The 1920 election saw a significant but not radical change, whereby by moving into a small number of traditionally Democratic areas in Middle Tennessee and expanding turnout due to the Nineteenth Amendment and powerful isolationist sentiment, the Republican Party was able to capture Tennessee's presidential electoral votes and win the governorship and take three congressional seats in addition to the rock-ribbed GOP First and Second Districts. In 1922 and 1924, with the ebbing of isolationist sympathy and a consequent decline in turnout, the Democratic Party regained Tennessee's governorship and presidential electoral votes.

Early in the campaign, Tennessee was seen as a "puzzle" for political pundits, and the state was viewed as "doubtful". Smith made a major battleground of Tennessee in his October campaign after Republican nominee Herbert Hoover visited earlier in the month and was confident of carrying Tennessee, criticising Hoover's campaign as "vague".

By the beginning of November it was thought by pollsters that Smith would carry the state, but as it turned out the state's votes went quite clearly to Hoover, despite the powerful Democratic loyalty of whites in West Tennessee. Hoover benefitted from a substantial Republican trend in normally rock-ribbed Democratic but heavily white counties of Middle Tennessee. Although Hoover managed to flip only Houston County – where he was the only Republican victor until Mitt Romney in 2012 – and heavily populated Davidson and "Little Confederacy" Sullivan Counties where he was the first Republican victor since Ulysses S. Grant in 1868, due to a powerful Prohibitionist anti-Catholic vote he gained very strongly compared to Coolidge's 1924 showing in many white counties that remained Democratic, and this added to the mountain and Highland Rim GOP vote ensured Hoover won the state.

This would be the best Republican performance in Tennessee between Grant's 36.85% 1868 landslide and Richard Nixon's carrying the state by 37.95% in 1972. Tennessee would not vote Republican again until Dwight Eisenhower narrowly won the state in 1952.

== Background ==
=== Scopes Trial and a Catholic Nominated by the Democrats ===
In 1925, Tennessee gained national prominence due to the "Scopes Monkey Trial" which aimed to outlaw the teaching of evolution in this powerfully fundamentalist Protestant state with a strong Ku Klux Klan, and a populace extremely hostile to the Catholic faith of most urban immigrants.

However, with most other Democrats sitting the 1928 election out due to the prevailing prosperity, the nomination of Catholic New York Governor Al Smith was always a foregone conclusion from the beginning of the election campaign. Once Smith was nominated – despite his attempt to dispel fears by nominating "dry" Southern Democrat Joseph T. Robinson as his running mate – extreme fear ensued in the South, which had no experience of the Southern and Eastern European Catholic immigrants who were Smith's local constituency. Southern fundamentalist Protestants believed that Smith would allow papal and priestly leadership in the United States, which Protestantism was a reaction against.

Nevertheless, fear that the Republicans would place the heavily black regions of West Tennessee under the influence of "Negro bossism" and possible abolition of lynching meant that whites in the far western region remained all along extremely loyal to Smith although in East Tennessee where many communities had become sundown towns or counties it was believed that Smith was unacceptable because the Catholic Church officially opposed social and political segregation of the races.

== Results ==
Presidential candidate	Running mate	Party	Electoral Vote (EV)	Popular Vote (PV)	
Herbert Hoover	Charles Curtis	Republican	12	195,388	53.76%
Al Smith	Joseph Taylor Robinson	Democratic	0	167,343 (Note: This total is 10,200 votes greater than that from America at the Polls.)	46.04%
Norman Thomas	James Maurer	Socialist	0	631	0.17%
William Z. Foster	Benjamin Gitlow	Communist	0	111	0.03%

=== Results by county ===
1928 United States presidential election in Tennessee by county (Note: The figures for Smith differ from those in Dave Leip's Atlas.)
County	Herbert Hoover Republican		Al Smith Democratic		Various candidates Other parties		Margin		Total votes cast
County	#	%	#	%	#	%	#	%	Total votes cast
Anderson	2,306	81.11%	537	18.89%	0	0.00%	1,769	62.22%	2,843
Bedford	1,405	47.84%	1,532	52.16%	0	0.00%	-127	-4.32%	2,937
Benton	949	43.08%	1,241	56.33%	13	0.59%	-292	-13.25%	2,203
Bledsoe	899	59.97%	600	40.03%	0	0.00%	299	19.95%	1,499
Blount	4,135	85.17%	715	14.73%	5	0.10%	3,420	70.44%	4,855
Bradley	2,854	75.70%	913	24.22%	3	0.08%	1,941	51.49%	3,770
Campbell	3,007	83.60%	585	16.26%	5	0.14%	2,422	67.33%	3,597
Cannon	588	48.60%	622	51.40%	0	0.00%	-34	-2.81%	1,210
Carroll	2,987	62.87%	1,743	36.69%	21	0.44%	1,244	26.18%	4,751
Carter	4,934	90.37%	512	9.38%	14	0.26%	4,422	80.99%	5,460
Cheatham	488	34.78%	913	65.07%	2	0.14%	-425	-30.29%	1,403
Chester	588	44.44%	735	55.56%	0	0.00%	-147	-11.11%	1,323
Claiborne	2,565	67.68%	1,225	32.32%	0	0.00%	1,340	35.36%	3,790
Clay	556	49.03%	576	50.79%	2	0.18%	-20	-1.76%	1,134
Cocke	2,909	80.05%	722	19.87%	3	0.08%	2,187	60.18%	3,634
Coffee	1,126	48.72%	1,175	50.84%	10	0.43%	-49	-2.12%	2,311
Crockett	710	48.66%	749	51.34%	0	0.00%	-39	-2.67%	1,459
Cumberland	1,188	70.09%	507	29.91%	0	0.00%	681	40.18%	1,695
Davidson	15,359	53.26%	13,453	46.65%	27	0.09%	1,906	6.61%	28,839
Decatur	748	47.95%	812	52.05%	0	0.00%	-64	-4.10%	1,560
DeKalb	2,261	57.23%	1,690	42.77%	0	0.00%	571	14.45%	3,951
Dickson	891	38.42%	1,428	61.58%	0	0.00%	-537	-23.16%	2,319
Dyer	842	24.04%	2,661	75.96%	0	0.00%	-1,819	-51.93%	3,503
Fayette	122	9.98%	1,100	90.02%	0	0.00%	-978	-80.03%	1,222
Fentress	1,399	78.07%	375	20.93%	18	1.00%	1,024	57.14%	1,792
Franklin	928	35.26%	1,698	64.51%	6	0.23%	-770	-29.26%	2,632
Gibson	1,372	31.97%	2,911	67.84%	8	0.19%	-1,539	-35.87%	4,291
Giles	1,032	27.94%	2,661	72.06%	0	0.00%	-1,629	-44.11%	3,693
Grainger	1,464	75.39%	466	24.00%	12	0.62%	998	51.39%	1,942
Greene	3,599	61.04%	2,297	38.96%	0	0.00%	1,302	22.08%	5,896
Grundy	380	38.31%	608	61.29%	4	0.40%	-228	-22.98%	992
Hamblen	1,902	59.96%	1,270	40.04%	0	0.00%	632	19.92%	3,172
Hamilton	13,244	64.49%	7,190	35.01%	103	0.50%	6,054	29.48%	20,537
Hancock	1,039	82.79%	216	17.21%	0	0.00%	823	65.58%	1,255
Hardeman	491	25.05%	1,459	74.44%	10	0.51%	-968	-49.39%	1,960
Hardin	1,585	68.88%	709	30.81%	7	0.30%	876	38.07%	2,301
Hawkins	2,969	71.28%	1,190	28.57%	6	0.14%	1,779	42.71%	4,165
Haywood	178	8.08%	2,024	91.92%	0	0.00%	-1,846	-83.83%	2,202
Henderson	2,005	72.86%	714	25.94%	33	1.20%	1,291	46.91%	2,752
Henry	1,041	28.04%	2,667	71.83%	5	0.13%	-1,626	-43.79%	3,713
Hickman	511	32.97%	1,039	67.03%	0	0.00%	-528	-34.06%	1,550
Houston	374	59.18%	258	40.82%	0	0.00%	116	18.35%	632
Humphreys	441	36.21%	771	63.30%	6	0.49%	-330	-27.09%	1,218
Jackson	617	42.14%	832	56.83%	15	1.02%	-215	-14.69%	1,464
Jefferson	2,582	85.53%	437	14.47%	0	0.00%	2,145	71.05%	3,019
Johnson	3,057	93.74%	196	6.01%	8	0.25%	2,861	87.73%	3,261
Knox	14,627	71.57%	5,767	28.22%	44	0.22%	8,860	43.35%	20,438
Lake	166	14.74%	960	85.26%	0	0.00%	-794	-70.52%	1,126
Lauderdale	430	13.32%	2,798	86.68%	0	0.00%	-2,368	-73.36%	3,228
Lawrence	3,581	56.19%	2,780	43.62%	12	0.19%	801	12.57%	6,373
Lewis	269	39.39%	414	60.61%	0	0.00%	-145	-21.23%	683
Lincoln	743	23.76%	2,377	76.02%	7	0.22%	-1,634	-52.25%	3,127
Loudon	2,128	78.26%	590	21.70%	1	0.04%	1,538	56.56%	2,719
Macon	1,937	82.22%	419	17.78%	0	0.00%	1,518	64.43%	2,356
Madison	1,894	34.62%	3,577	65.38%	0	0.00%	-1,683	-30.76%	5,471
Marion	1,659	58.83%	1,161	41.17%	0	0.00%	498	17.66%	2,820
Marshall	735	31.69%	1,584	68.31%	0	0.00%	-849	-36.61%	2,319
Maury	1,362	27.16%	3,652	72.84%	0	0.00%	-2,290	-45.67%	5,014
McMinn	4,440	68.51%	2,025	31.25%	16	0.25%	2,415	37.26%	6,481
McNairy	2,326	65.80%	1,209	34.20%	0	0.00%	1,117	31.60%	3,535
Meigs	722	55.07%	589	44.93%	0	0.00%	133	10.14%	1,311
Monroe	3,312	61.99%	2,031	38.01%	0	0.00%	1,281	23.98%	5,343
Montgomery	1,748	48.34%	1,868	51.66%	0	0.00%	-120	-3.32%	3,616
Moore	133	23.29%	431	75.48%	7	1.23%	-298	-52.19%	571
Morgan	1,487	76.93%	446	23.07%	0	0.00%	1,041	53.85%	1,933
Obion	789	24.05%	2,492	75.95%	0	0.00%	-1,703	-51.90%	3,281
Overton	1,195	51.80%	1,105	47.90%	7	0.30%	90	3.90%	2,307
Perry	360	36.66%	622	63.34%	0	0.00%	-262	-26.68%	982
Pickett	745	65.64%	383	33.74%	7	0.62%	362	31.89%	1,135
Polk	1,760	63.22%	1,012	36.35%	12	0.43%	748	26.87%	2,784
Putnam	1,612	42.91%	2,145	57.09%	0	0.00%	-533	-14.19%	3,757
Rhea	1,588	65.24%	846	34.76%	0	0.00%	742	30.48%	2,434
Roane	2,971	79.14%	761	20.27%	22	0.59%	2,210	58.87%	3,754
Robertson	848	35.30%	1,543	64.24%	11	0.46%	-695	-28.93%	2,402
Rutherford	1,429	40.32%	2,115	59.68%	0	0.00%	-686	-19.36%	3,544
Scott	2,700	91.59%	244	8.28%	4	0.14%	2,456	83.31%	2,948
Sequatchie	298	43.76%	383	56.24%	0	0.00%	-85	-12.48%	681
Sevier	3,874	92.57%	308	7.36%	3	0.07%	3,566	85.21%	4,185
Shelby	11,969	39.76%	18,040	59.93%	92	0.31%	-6,071	-20.17%	30,101
Smith	1,150	44.13%	1,446	55.49%	10	0.38%	-296	-11.36%	2,606
Stewart	403	24.28%	1,257	75.72%	0	0.00%	-854	-51.45%	1,660
Sullivan	4,151	56.35%	3,216	43.65%	0	0.00%	935	12.69%	7,367
Sumner	1,045	29.12%	2,541	70.80%	3	0.08%	-1,496	-41.68%	3,589
Tipton	425	18.25%	1,889	81.11%	15	0.64%	-1,464	-62.86%	2,329
Trousdale	179	22.74%	607	77.13%	1	0.13%	-428	-54.38%	787
Unicoi	2,044	84.22%	376	15.49%	7	0.29%	1,668	68.73%	2,427
Union	1,826	83.30%	360	16.42%	6	0.27%	1,466	66.88%	2,192
Van Buren	257	49.71%	260	50.29%	0	0.00%	-3	-0.58%	517
Warren	923	45.13%	1,112	54.38%	10	0.49%	-189	-9.24%	2,045
Washington	4,889	75.99%	1,545	24.01%	0	0.00%	3,344	51.97%	6,434
Wayne	1,756	81.71%	382	17.78%	11	0.51%	1,374	63.94%	2,149
Weakley	1,358	35.25%	2,495	64.75%	0	0.00%	-1,137	-29.51%	3,853
White	776	43.16%	1,022	56.84%	0	0.00%	-246	-13.68%	1,798
Williamson	693	30.20%	1,595	69.50%	7	0.31%	-902	-39.30%	2,295
Wilson	1,049	39.17%	1,629	60.83%	0	0.00%	-580	-21.66%	2,678
Totals	195,388	55.32%	157,143	44.49%	661	0.19%	38,245	10.83%	353,192

== See also ==
- 1928 United States Senate election in Tennessee
- 1928 Tennessee gubernatorial election
