= Hill McAlister =

American politician (1875–1959)

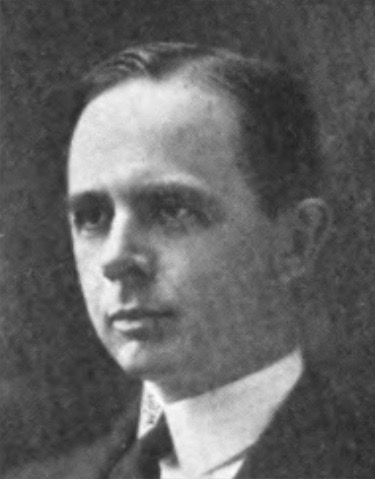
- Portrait, c. 1930

37th Governor of Tennessee
- In office January 17, 1933 – January 15, 1937
- Preceded by: Henry H. Horton
- Succeeded by: Gordon Browning

Personal details
- Born: July 15, 1875 Nashville, Tennessee, U.S.
- Died: October 30, 1959 (aged 84) Nashville, Tennessee, U.S.
- Resting place: Mount Olivet Cemetery (Nashville)
- Party: Democratic
- Spouse: Louise Jackson (m. 1901)
- Relations: Willie Blount (great-great-grandfather); Aaron V. Brown (great-grandfather); Howell Jackson (father-in-law)
- Education: Vanderbilt University (1897)
- Profession: Attorney

Harry Hill McAlister (July 15, 1875 – October 30, 1959) was an American lawyer and politician who served as the 37th governor of Tennessee from 1933 to 1937. He also served as Nashville's city attorney in the early 1900s, and as Tennessee's state treasurer in the 1920s and early 1930s. Inaugurated as governor at the height of the Great Depression, McAlister enacted massive spending cuts in an attempt to stabilize state finances. He coordinated federal programs in the state aimed at providing Depression-era relief, and was a supporter of the New Deal.

McAlister withdrew from state politics in 1936 following a quarrel with powerful Memphis political boss E. H. Crump. He spent the last two decades of his life as a Referee in Bankruptcy in Nashville's district court.

== Early life ==
McAlister was born in Nashville, Tennessee in 1875, the son of William King McAlister, a lawyer and judge, and Laura (Dortch) McAlister. He attended Vanderbilt University, graduating with a Bachelor of Laws (LL.B) in 1897. He was admitted to the bar, and began practice in Nashville in 1899.

McAlister became Nashville's assistant city attorney in 1901, and was elevated to city attorney in 1905. He was elected to the Tennessee Senate in 1910, and served two terms (1911–1915). As a state senator, he sought stricter enforcement of laws regarding education and child labor, and advocated better food and drug inspections. He also sought funding for a tuberculosis hospital for Nashville. McAlister was an elector for President Woodrow Wilson in 1916, and served on the state Democratic Executive Committee from 1918 to 1920.

The Tennessee General Assembly appointed McAlister state treasurer in 1919. He served in this position until 1927, and again from 1931 to 1933. During the 1920s, he consistently warned that the state faced an impending financial crisis, and assailed Governor Austin Peay's reforms.

== Governor ==
In the governor's race of 1926, McAlister sought the Democratic Party's nomination against the incumbent, Austin Peay. Peay had radically transformed the state government, and had angered numerous members of his own party in the process, among them political bosses E. H. Crump of Memphis and Hilary Howse of Nashville. With the help of Crump and Howse, McAlister was able to win Shelby and Davidson counties, but Peay won the state's rural areas and East Tennessee, and defeated McAlister for the nomination by 7,000 votes.

In 1928, McAlister again sought the nomination, this time against incumbent Henry Horton, who had become governor following Peay's death the previous year. McAlister had the support of Crump and Howse, while Horton had the support of powerful publisher Luke Lea. A third candidate, Lewis S. Pope, also sought the nomination. Though the primary campaign was hard-fought, McAlister fell short, losing to Horton 97,333 votes to 92,017 (Pope tallied just 27,779 votes).

By late 1930, the effects of the stock market crash of 1929 had reached Tennessee. A few days after Horton's victory in the general election, numerous banks controlled by Lea's business associate, Rogers Caldwell, failed, wiping out over $6 million in state deposits. Horton faced impeachment, and Lea was indicted on charges of bank fraud. While the motion calling for Horton's impeachment failed in the state House, both Caldwell and Lea were eventually convicted on charges of bank fraud.

McAlister, who had warned of the impending crisis, was reappointed state treasurer, and sought the party's nomination for governor again in 1932. Although Horton had survived impeachment, he did not seek further reelection, and McAlister's main competitors were Pope and former governor Malcolm R. Patterson. Crump's support, which gave McAlister a 25,000-vote advantage in Shelby County, proved to be the deciding factor, as McAlister won the nomination, 117,400 votes to 108,400 for Pope, and 60,520 for Patterson. Pope accused Crump of voter fraud, and ran against McAlister in the general election as an independent. On election day, McAlister won easily, with 169,075 votes to 117,797 for the Republican candidate, John E. McCall, and 106,990 for Pope.

Facing a $6 million state debt and an economy ravaged by business and bank failures, McAlister immediately began trimming the state government. He slashed over 2,300 jobs from the government workforce, and cut $7 million in state spending. These cuts included the cost of the governor's mansion, which McAlister reduced from $35,000 per year to just $1,000. McAlister supported the Tennessee Valley Authority and other Depression-era federal programs. The construction of Norris Dam and Pickwick Landing Dam began during his tenure.

In April 1933, shortly after the beginning of McAlister's term, the state adopted the iris as the state flower, and the mockingbird as the state bird.

In 1934, Pope, determined to break Crump's power, again challenged McAlister for the Democratic nomination, but came up short, winning just 137,253 votes to McAlister's 191,460. In the general election, Pope once again ran as an independent, and tried to form a fusion ticket with former Republican governor Ben W. Hooper, similar to the one that had elected Hooper more than two decades earlier. Hooper called on Republicans to support Pope in the gubernatorial election, while Pope called on independent Democrats to support Hooper in his Senate campaign against Crump ally, Kenneth McKellar. The plan failed, however, with Pope losing to McAlister, 198,743 votes to 122,965, and McKellar soundly defeating Hooper.

During his second term, McAlister angered Crump by proposing a state sales tax. Crump's allies in the state house defeated the tax, and he broke off support for McAlister, calling him "our sorriest governor." McAlister angered Crump further when he refused to allow the sale of liquor in Memphis (federal prohibition had ended with the repeal of the 18th Amendment, but state prohibition remained in effect). Realizing he had little chance of winning without Crump's support, McAlister did not seek reelection to a third term.

== Later life ==
Following his second term, McAlister retired to his home in Nashville, and continued to practice law. He was appointed field counsel for the Bituminous Coal Commission in Washington, D.C., in 1936. In 1940, he was appointed Referee in Bankruptcy for Nashville's federal district court, and remained in this position for the rest of his life. He died on October 30, 1959, and was buried in Nashville's Mount Olivet Cemetery.

== Family ==
McAlister was descended (via his mother) from two former Tennessee governors, Willie Blount (1768–1835), his great-great-grandfather, and Aaron V. Brown (1795–1859), his great-grandfather. Willie Blount was the younger half-brother of territorial governor, William Blount.

McAlister married Louise Jackson, daughter of U.S. Supreme Court justice Howell E. Jackson, in 1901. They had two daughters.

== See also ==
- List of governors of Tennessee

Party political offices
Preceded by Henry Hollis Horton	Democratic nominee for Governor of Tennessee; 1932, 1934	Succeeded by Gordon Browning
Political offices
Preceded by Henry Hollis Horton	Governor of Tennessee; 1933–1937	Succeeded by Gordon Browning
