= Luke Lea (American politician, born 1879) =

American politician (1879–1945)

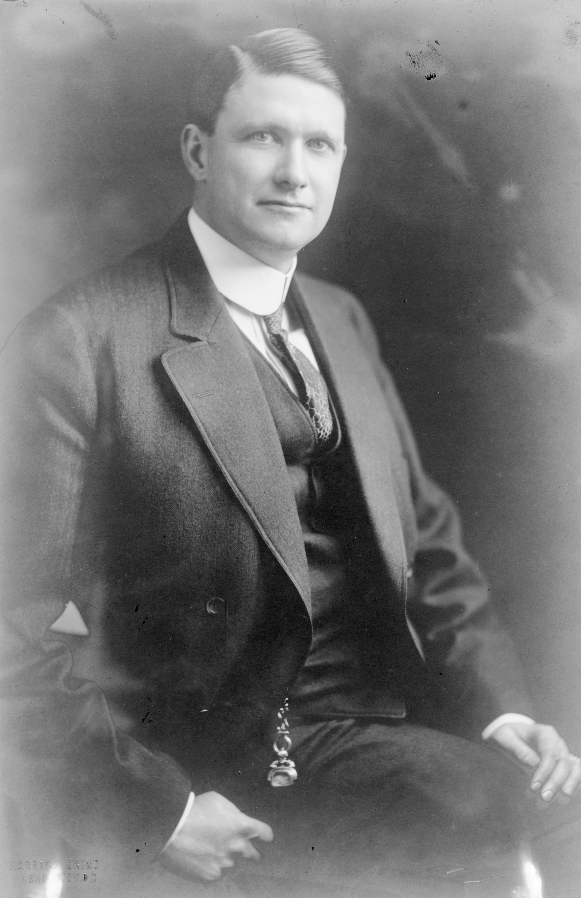

United States Senator from Tennessee
- In office March 4, 1911 – March 3, 1917
- Preceded by: James B. Frazier
- Succeeded by: Kenneth D. McKellar

Personal details
- Born: April 12, 1879 Nashville, Tennessee, U.S.
- Died: November 18, 1945 (aged 66) Nashville, Tennessee, U.S.
- Resting place: Mount Olivet Cemetery, Nashville, Tennessee
- Party: Democratic
- Spouse(s): Mary Louise Warner (m. 1906–1918, her death); Percie Warner (m. 1920–1945, his death)
- Children: 5
- Education: University of the South; Columbia Law School
- Occupation: Attorney; Newspaper publisher Businessman
- Awards: Army Distinguished Service Medal

Military service
- Allegiance: United States
- Branch/service: United States Army
- Years of service: 1918–1919
- Rank: Colonel
- Unit: 114th Field Artillery Regiment
- Battles/wars: World War I: Battle of Saint-Mihiel; Meuse-Argonne Offensive

Luke Lea (April 12, 1879 – November 18, 1945) was an American attorney, politician and newspaper publisher. A Democrat, he was most notable for his service as a United States senator from Tennessee from 1911 to 1917. Lea was the longtime publisher of The Tennessean newspaper in Nashville, and a United States Army veteran of World War I. In 1919 he led an unauthorized and unsuccessful attempt to kidnap the recently exiled German Kaiser Wilhelm II.

== Early life ==
Lea was the son of John Overton and Ella (née Cocke) Lea. He was born into a political family after Reconstruction and named for a paternal great-grandfather, Luke Lea, who was a two-term congressman from Tennessee in the 1830s. Initially an ardent supporter of Democrat Andrew Jackson, the elder Lea later became a member of the Whig Party. One of Lea's maternal great-grandfathers was William Cocke, who served in the U.S. Senate from Tennessee from 1796 to 1797, and again from 1799 to 1805.

Lea received his early education from tutors at home. He attended University of the South in Sewanee, Tennessee, graduating with a bachelor's degree in 1899. He received a master's degree in 1900. Lea was the manager of the "Iron Men" of the 1899 Sewanee Tigers football team, and was credited with organizing their schedule of games. The Tigers won five road games in six days, and outscored opponents 322 to 10. A documentary film about that team and Luke Lea's role was released in 2022 called Unrivaled: Sewanee 1899.

He attended Columbia Law School in New York City, from which he graduated in 1903. Lea was admitted to the bar the same year, and began to practice in Nashville.

== Early career ==
In addition to practicing law, Lea formed a company to purchase the Nashville American newspaper. Reorganized as the Nashville Tennessean, Lea served as its first editor and publisher. He later merged the Tennessean with the Nashville Democrat, and his newspaper was a leading proponent of Prohibition.

One of Lea's associates at the American and later the Tennessean was Edward W. Carmack. Lea became involved in Democratic Party politics as a member of the faction led by Carmack. In 1908, Carmack was shot and killed by Duncan Brown Cooper, a former editor of the American, and Cooper's son Robin. Carmack wounded Robin Cooper with return fire. The Coopers were part of the Democratic Party faction led by Malcolm R. Patterson, who was elected governor in 1906, and whom Carmack had challenged unsuccessfully for the Democratic nomination in 1908. Duncan and Robin Cooper were both convicted of second-degree murder and sentenced to prison. Duncan Cooper's conviction was affirmed on appeal, after which he received a pardon from Patterson. Robin Cooper won an appeal and the right to a retrial, but no prosecutor was willing to re-try the case, so he went free. Lea assumed leadership of the Carmack faction, which succeeded in persuading Patterson to withdraw from the 1910 campaign.

== United States Senator ==
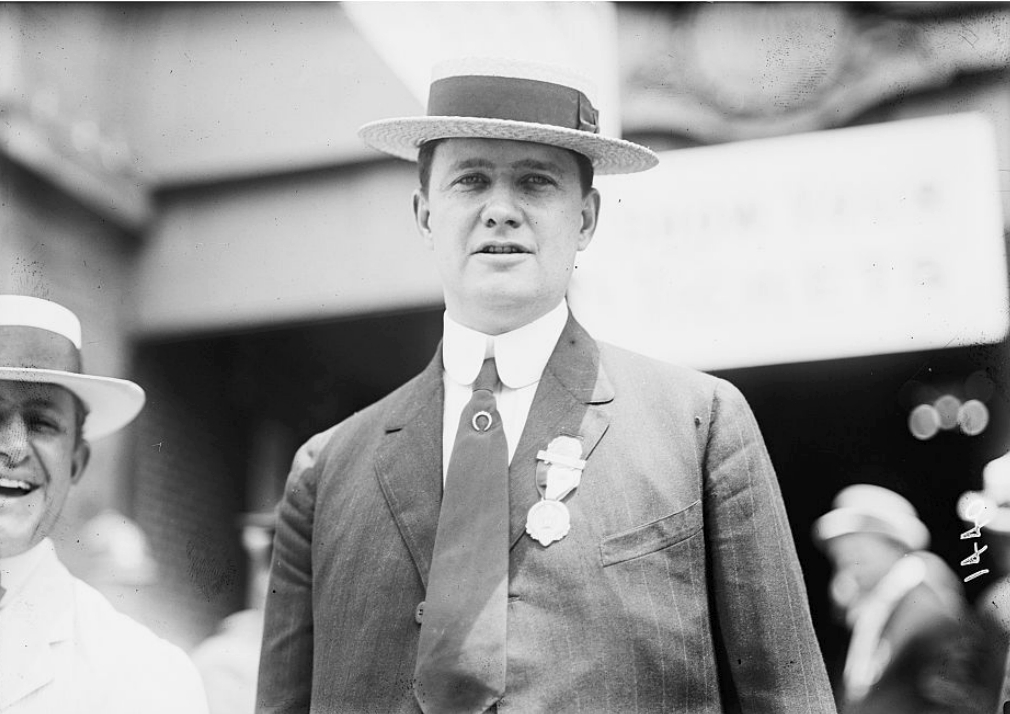
Lea at the 1912 Democratic Convention

Lea was elected to the Senate by the Tennessee General Assembly in 1911; after 10 unsuccessful ballots, his name was introduced as a compromise choice, and he was selected on the 11th ballot. He was an enthusiastic supporter of most of the progressive policies of Democratic President Woodrow Wilson, a fellow native of the South. Elected president in 1912, Wilson was only the second Democrat to gain the office since the end of the Civil War. During the 63rd Congress, Lea was chairman of the Senate Committee on the Library (of Congress).

Socially progressive but fiscally conservative, Lea actively supported lowering tariffs, the creation of the Federal Reserve System, the regulation of major corporations, and the breaking up of trusts. He also supported women's suffrage and a national prohibition amendment. He allied with Robert La Follette and supported his seaman's act. He approved of the eight-hour day and opposed child labor.

In 1913, Lea began his most ambitious undertaking in the Senate when he attempted to launch a federal investigation of the railroads and political corruption in Tennessee. The investigation encouraged the railroads to cease distributing free passes as political favors, but the growing crisis of the First World War eventually overshadowed concerns about corruption, and the investigation was shelved.

During Lea's term, the Seventeenth Amendment changed the method of election of Senators from election by the state legislatures to direct popular vote. Lea supported this measure. Lea contended for the 1916 Democratic nomination for the seat but was defeated by Kenneth McKellar, a colleague of Memphis political "boss" E. H. Crump. McKellar was re-elected to a total of six terms, and is to date Tennessee's longest-serving senator. Despite his lame duck status, Lea continued to work on the progressive agenda. He voted to confirm Louis Brandeis to the Supreme Court, and supported a number of progressive measures in the Senate including immigration reform, the Shipping Act of 1916, and the Revenue Act of 1916.

== World War I ==
Shortly after the end of Lea's Senate term, the U.S. entered World War I. Lea had been opposed to U.S. involvement, but once war was declared, he joined the United States Army and raised a volunteer Field Artillery regiment. Lea's regiment was mustered into federal service as the 114th Field Artillery Regiment, a unit of the 39th Division, which Lea commanded as a colonel. The regiment distinguished itself in France, including the Battle of Saint-Mihiel and the Meuse-Argonne Offensive. Lea was awarded the Army Distinguished Service Medal for his wartime efforts.

=== Attempt to kidnap Kaiser Wilhelm II ===
In January 1919, Lea and a group of three officers and three sergeants from his unit, the 114th Field Artillery, traveled to Kasteel Amerongen in the Netherlands in a failed attempt to seize the recently exiled German Kaiser Wilhelm II and bring him to the Paris Peace Conference for potential trial for war crimes. One of the officers accompanying Lea was Larry MacPhail.

This attempt was apparently inspired by a chance meeting with the Duke of Connaught in 1918 who had told Lea that he was the uncle of both King George V and the Kaiser and suggested that the European establishment would protect the Kaiser.

The Americans entered the Netherlands using false civilian passports travelling in two staff cars with weapons concealed under the seats. On arriving at the Chateau where the Kaiser was staying, Lea introduced himself to the son of the local count as American officers. They immediately raised suspicions and the Kaiser unsurprisingly refused to see them. They retreated to their cars, after stealing an inscribed bronze ashtray, and fled the country.

After an investigation of the incident, the Army reprimanded Lea, MacPhail and the others as it was illegal for them to have entered a neutral country.

== Later career ==
After the close of the war, Lea returned to Nashville and resumed operation of his newspaper. In 1919 he was one of the founders of the American Legion and served prominently in various leadership roles. In 1929 Governor Henry H. Horton nominated Lea for appointment to the Senate seat vacated by the death of Lawrence D. Tyson. Lea declined, choosing instead to remain active in the banking and real estate businesses. Horton nominated William Emerson Brock, who accepted.

In the 1920s, Lea was a major investor in the Nashville investment banking firm of Caldwell & Company, due in part to his friendship with its founder Rogers Caldwell. When accusations of corruption were subsequently made about the bank, Lea and his associates became the subject of rumor that they too were corrupt.

== Conviction and imprisonment ==
Lea was indicted in North Carolina with others, including his eldest son, for bank fraud resulting from the 1930 collapse of the Central Bank and Trust Company of Asheville, North Carolina, a bank with which he had become affiliated through his connection with Caldwell & Company. Both Lea and his son were tried in North Carolina in 1931. L. E. Gwinn, a prominent Memphis attorney whose specialty was criminal law, was brought in along with other attorneys, and the detailed preparation of the North Carolina case was entrusted to him. The Leas were convicted on three of seven counts. Luke was sentenced to six to 10 years in prison.

After the Leas’ appeals were exhausted and after the U.S. Supreme Court denied their petition for a writ of certiorari, both Leas reported for imprisonment at Raleigh in May 1934. Lea received a parole in April 1936, and he received a full pardon in June 1937. Through the end of his life, Lea maintained that he and his son were wrongly prosecuted and convicted and that the prosecution was political in nature, with Lea being made the scapegoat for the Central Bank and Trust’s failure by his Republican foes in North Carolina and Tennessee.

== Death and burial ==
Lea died on November 18, 1945, at the Vanderbilt University Hospital in Nashville, at the age of 66. He was buried at Mount Olivet Cemetery in Nashville.

== Family ==
Lea married Mary Louise Warner in 1906. They were the parents of Luke Lea Jr. and Percy Warner Lea. Mary Lea died while Luke Lea was en route to France during World War I. Lea married Percy Warner in 1920; she was the sister of his first wife. Luke and Percy Lea were the parents of Mary Louise, Laura, and Overton.

== Legacy ==
They resided at 3700 Whitland Avenue in Nashville, Tennessee. The house, known as Washington Hall, is listed on the National Register of Historic Places as a contributing property to the Whitland Area Neighborhood.

Lea Heights in Nashville's Percy Warner Park, a place offering an excellent view of the downtown Nashville skyline, is named in his honor. The original land grant establishing Percy Warner Park was donated by Lea and his family to Nashville. The park is named for Lea's father-in-law.

== Representation in other media ==
The book At Heaven's Gate by Southern writer Robert Penn Warren is said to be a roman à clef about the 1920s era and Caldwell & Company in the Nashville area, as are aspects of the novel A Summons to Memphis by the novelist Peter Matthew Hillsman Taylor. Author David Neil Drews released Iron Tigers in 2023—a historical novel inspired by the 1899 Sewanee football team. The novel's Alfie Melville is significantly based on Luke Lea—the 1899 Sewanee team's manager and mastermind of their epic season.

== See also ==
- List of members of the American Legion

== Resources ==
- Mary Louise Lea Tidwell, Luke Lea of Tennessee, Bowling Green State University Popular Press, 1993, ISBN 0-87972-624-5.

U.S. Senate
Preceded by James B. Frazier	U.S. senator (Class 1) from Tennessee; 1911–1917; Served alongside: Robert Love Taylor, Newell Sanders, William R. Webb, John K. Shields	Succeeded by Kenneth D. McKellar
