= E. H. Crump =

American politician (1874–1954)

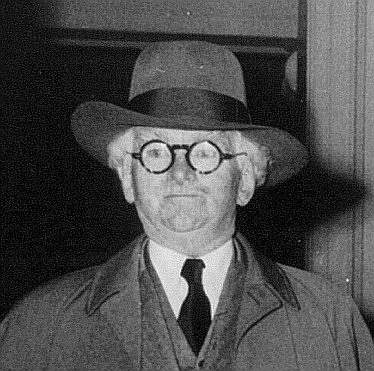
- Crump in 1945

Member of the U.S. House of Representatives from Tennessee
- In office March 4, 1931 – January 3, 1935
- Preceded by: Hubert Fisher
- Succeeded by: Walter Chandler
- Constituency: 10th district (1931–1933); 9th district (1933–1935)

Mayor of Memphis
- In office 1910–1915
- Preceded by: James H. Malone
- Succeeded by: George C. Love

Personal details
- Born: Edward Hull Crump; October 2, 1874 Holly Springs, Mississippi, U.S.
- Died: October 16, 1954 (aged 80) Memphis, Tennessee, U.S.
- Party: Democratic

Edward Hull "Boss" Crump Jr. (October 2, 1874 – October 16, 1954) was an American politician based in Memphis, Tennessee. Representing the Democratic Party, he was the dominant force in the city's politics for most of the first half of the 20th century. He also played a major role in Tennessee state politics from the 1920s to the 1940s. He was elected and served as mayor of Memphis from 1910 to 1915 and again briefly in 1940. However, he effectively sponsored every mayor who was elected from 1915 to 1954.

== Career ==
A native of Holly Springs in northern Mississippi, 19-year-old Crump moved to Memphis, Tennessee, on September 21, 1893, according to the Holly Springs Reporter. When he first arrived in Memphis, the ongoing Panic of 1893, possibly the worst recession in the United States to that time, made it hard for Crump to find work. Eventually, he obtained a clerical position with the Walter Goodman Cotton Company, on Front Street in downtown Memphis. This was the start of his successful business career as a broker and trader.

Early in 1901, Crump began seriously courting 23-year-old Bessie Byrd McLean. Bessie (or Betty) McLean, the only child of Mr. and Mrs. Robert McLean (Mr. McLean was then the vice president of the William R. Moore Dry Goods Company), was a prominent Memphis socialite and considered "one of the city's most beautiful and most sought after women." Crump and McLean were married on January 22, 1902 at Calvary Episcopal Church.

In his youth, Crump was known as the “Red Snapper” because of his bright red hair.

== Politics ==
Alongside his rising business career, Crump began to make the political connections that served him for the rest of his life. He was a delegate to the Tennessee Democratic State Convention in 1902 and 1904. In 1905, he was named to the municipal Board of Public Works, and was elected to the powerful position of Commissioner of Fire and Police in 1907, among three commissioners who governed the city.

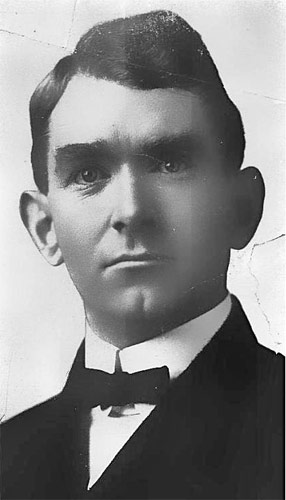
Mayor Crump c. 1915.

Starting in the 1910s, Crump began to build a political machine which came to have statewide influence. He was particularly adept in his use of what were at the time two politically weak minority groups in Tennessee: Blacks and Republicans. Unlike most Southern Democrats of his era, Crump was not opposed to Blacks voting. The Memphis-based African American Memphis Jug Band, which he often booked at his home when he held parties, was also among his favorite musicians. Memphis Blacks were reliable Crump machine voters for the most part. The party often paid the poll taxes required by state law since the late 1880s; otherwise this requirement resulted in disenfranchising many poor Black people. One of Crump's lieutenants in the Black community was funeral director N. J. Ford, whose family (in the persons of several sons, including Harold Sr. and John Ford, daughter Ophelia, and grandson Harold, Jr.) became influential in Memphis, state and national politics, continuing to be so today. A symbiotic relationship developed in which Black people aided Crump, and he aided them, as was usual in politics. Crump also skillfully manipulated Republicans, who were numerically very weak in the western two-thirds of the state due to the disenfranchisement of the Black population, but dominated politics in East Tennessee. Frequently, they found it necessary to align with Crump in order to accomplish any of their goals in the state government.

Crump was influential for nearly half a century. He usually preferred to work behind the scenes and served only three two-year terms as mayor of Memphis (1910–1915) at the beginning of his career. He essentially named the next several mayors. His rise to prominence disturbed many of the state political leaders in Nashville. The "Ouster Law", designed to remove officials who refused to enforce state laws, was passed primarily with Crump in mind, who was responsible for lax enforcement of state Prohibition. He was county treasurer of Shelby County from 1917 to 1923. He was elected seven times as a delegate to the Democratic National Convention.

Crump became involved in earnest in state politics during the 1928 gubernatorial election when Henry Horton was seeking election in his own right. Horton had earlier been speaker of the state senate and succeeded to the position of governor when Austin Peay died in office. Crump supported Hill McAlister in the Democratic primary, while the Nashville machine of Luke Lea supported Governor Horton. Horton won the primary despite the strong vote for McAlister in populous Shelby County. When Horton ran for reelection in 1930, Crump and Lea cut a deal, and Crump swung his formidable political machine behind Horton. Horton defeated independent Democrat L. E. Gwinn in the primary and Republican C. Arthur Bruce in the general election.

After years of working behind the scenes, Crump decided to run for U.S. Representative in 1930. He was easily elected to the Tenth District, which was then co-extensive with Shelby County (it became the Ninth in 1932). He served two terms: from March 4, 1931, to January 3, 1935. (The Twentieth Amendment was enacted in 1933, shifting the starting date of Congressional terms.) During this time, he was also a regent of the Smithsonian Institution. He remained hugely influential in Memphis as well. He was in constant communication with his operatives there and visited during each congressional recess.

In 1936, Crump was named to the Democratic National Committee, serving on that body until 1945. In 1939, he was elected a final time as mayor, although that term was officially served by Walter Chandler. Chandler was U.S. Representative for the Ninth District, and Crump thought that Chandler's time was better spent tending to congressional matters in Washington than campaigning for mayor in Memphis. So, without a platform, without a speech, and without opposition, Crump was elected mayor of Memphis.

Crump was sworn in at a few minutes past midnight on January 1, 1940, in a snowstorm on the platform of the railroad station, just before leaving for New Orleans to attend the Sugar Bowl football game. In high humor, he resigned immediately. Vice Mayor Joseph Boyle became Mayor until the next day, when the faithful City Commission met and elected Chandler. Watkins Overton's term had ended at midnight, and thus Memphis had four mayors in less than twenty-four hours.

In 1940, Crump initiated a campaign of political persecution against J. B. Martin, a founder of the Memphis Red Sox and the head of the Negro American League. Martin, a longtime Republican Party activist, had become chair of the Shelby County Republican Party in October. After he staged a rally for Republican Wendell Willkie later than month, Crump ordered officers to "police" or search all patrons of Martin's South Memphis Drugstore, including children. Because Crump threatened a possible term for him in prison workhouse on trumped up charges, Martin left the city. Republican leaders and civil rights organizations, such as the NAACP, urged the Roosevelt administration to bring charges against, or denounce, Crump, who benefited from a close alliance with President Roosevelt, but had no success. Although the head of the Civil Rights Section of the Department of Justice indicated a willingness to prosecute Crump for violation of Martin's civil rights, more senior officials in the Roosevelt administration refused to do so. When Martin briefly returned to Memphis in 1943 to attend a game at the Martin Stadium (which he had helped to build), police arrested him, put him in a holding cell, and ordered to leave Memphis. By this time, however, Martin had settled permanently in Chicago.

Less than a month after this incident, Martin and Robert Church Jr., another Black Republican leader who had also been driven out of the city by Crump, successfully urged labor leader A. Philip Randolph to come to Memphis to speak out against Crump's suppression of free speech. Crump's subordinates responded by denying Randolph speaking venues by intimidating local Black leaders into withdrawing invitations and shunning him. When Randolph urged Eleanor Roosevelt, who had friendly political ties with Crump, to do something to counter Crump's "fascist" denial of free speech, she refused. Her reply on December 18, 1943 to Randolph read in full: "I referred your letter to a friend of mine when I received it and I am sorry it has not been answered before. I was advised not to do anything, as it might do more harm than good."

Crump's statewide influence began to wane in the late 1940s. Edward J. Meeman, editor of the Memphis Press-Scimitar, opposed Crump's initiatives and called for a city manager government and abolition of the poll tax to weaken the power of the machine. He also worked to unseat U. S. Senator Tom Stewart, whom Crump supported in the 1948 Democratic primary against his intra-party challenger, U.S. Representative Estes Kefauver. Gordon Browning, a one-time protégé whom Crump had helped elect governor in 1936, was elected governor again in 1948, this time over Crump's opposition. For the rest of his life, Crump's influence was largely limited to Memphis. In 1952, his longtime associate, Senator Kenneth McKellar, was defeated in the Democratic primary — in those days with a practically powerless state Republican party, the real contest in Tennessee — by Congressman Albert Gore Sr. A final triumph for Crump was the victory in 1952 of his chosen candidate, Frank G. Clement in the gubernatorial primary over Browning.

Crump died less than two years later. He is interred at Elmwood Cemetery in Memphis.

== Political machine ==
From the 1910s to the 1950s, Memphis was a locus of machine politics under the direction of Crump. He obtained a state law in 1911 to establish a small commission to manage the city. The city retained a form of commission government until 1967, but Crump was in full control at all times. He used all of the familiar techniques of the big city boss: ballot manipulation, patronage for friends, and frustrating bureaucratic obstacles for the opposition. Crump built a complex alliance with established power figures at the local, state, and national levels. He ensured that dissidents had little or no voice.

At the center of his network was "Cotton Row," the business elite that dominated the cotton industry. Secondly, he included the modernizers: business-oriented progressives who were most concerned with upgrading the city's waterfront, parks, highways, and skyscrapers, as well as a moderately good school system. Working-class whites got their share of jobs, but labor unions had marginal influence.

Time Magazine cover, May 27, 1946.

In the mid-1940's Crump was considered such a significant figure nationally that Time Magazine devoted its cover article to him.

Roger Biles argues that the political system was virtually unchanged from 1910 into the 1950s and 1960s, thanks to Crump's wire-pulling. Crump was the leading Tennessee supporter of Franklin D. Roosevelt and the New Deal. In return, the city received ample relief programs, which provided jobs for the unemployed, as selected by machine lieutenants. The city also got major federal building projects, which helped to fund the business community. Crump incorporated hand-picked black leaders of proven loyalty to the machine in his outer circle by dispensing patronage in return for the black vote. Memphis was one of the largest southern cities in which blacks could vote, although segregation was as rigid as elsewhere in the South. The amounts which African Americans received from Crump's largess, however, were comparatively minuscule. Of the more than $300,000 spent on Memphis parks in 1937, for example, only $3,000 went to African Americans though they were forty percent of Memphis's population.

== Legacy ==
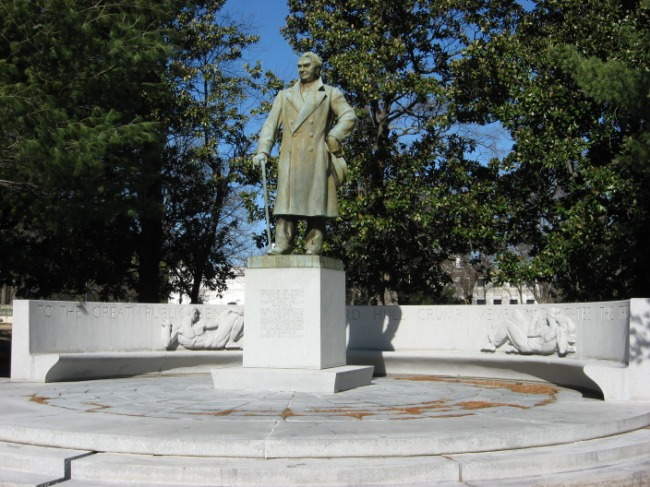
Statue of E.H. Crump in Overton Park, Memphis, Tennessee.

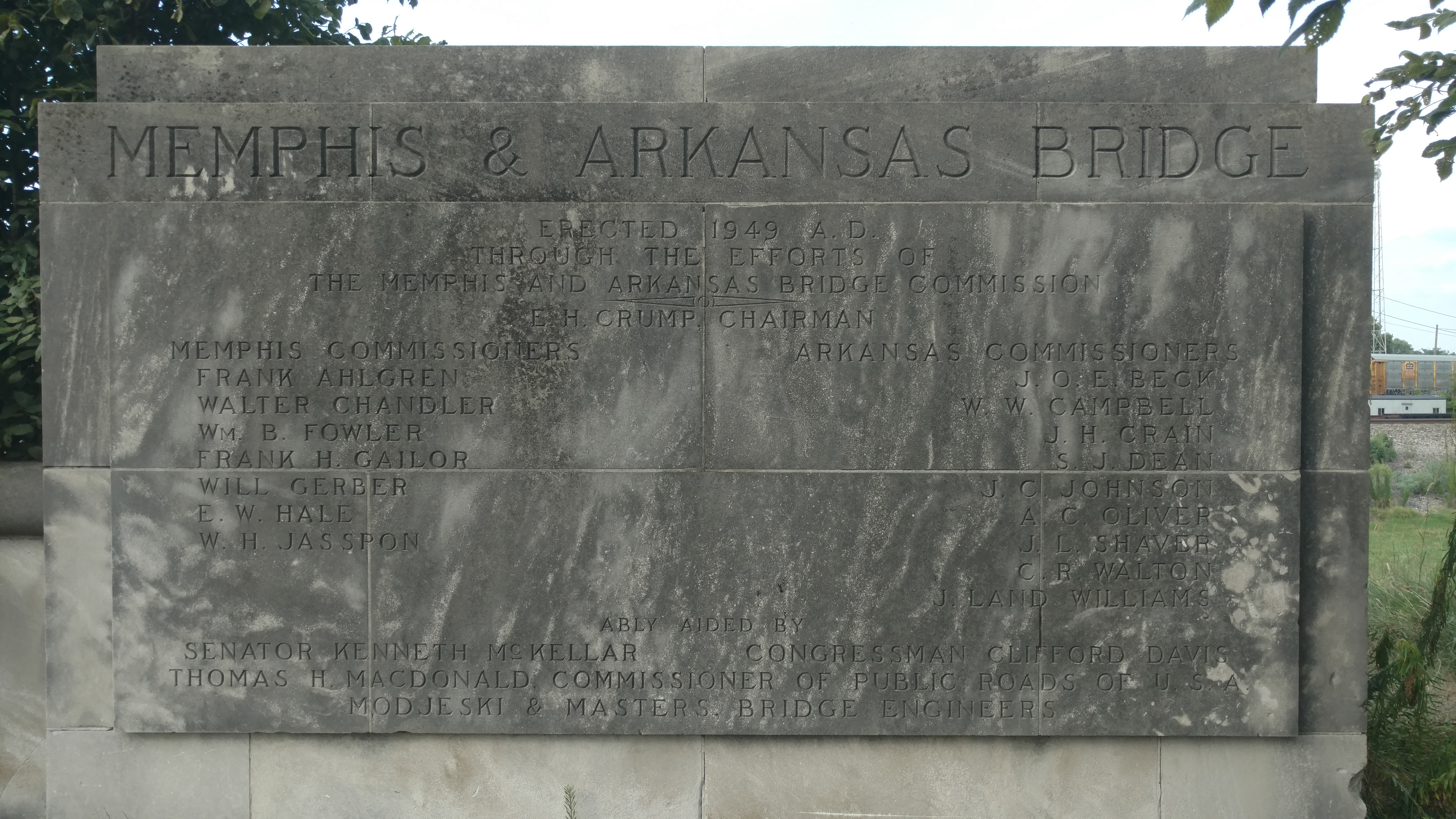
Original 1949 Memphis nameplate of Memphis & Arkansas Bridge listing Crump as chair of its commission.

- Crump was a strong supporter of the fire service and for many years the Memphis Fire Department was considered one of the best in the country; it still has a high reputation.
- He believed that separate operations for each municipal utility were inherently inefficient and combined them; in the early 21st century, Memphis Light, Gas and Water is one of the largest combined municipal utilities in the United States.
- Crump thought that cities should not be too noisy; Memphis has strong noise ordinances that are more aggressively enforced than those of many other jurisdictions.
- He was an early supporter of requiring automobile safety inspections; all of Memphis-registered vehicles were inspected annually (twice a year until the 1990s), until June 28, 2013, when all city inspections ceased after a de-funding of the department by the Memphis City Council.
- The city's Crump Stadium, E. H. Crump Memorial Hospital, and Crump Boulevard are named after him. He also chaired the joint Memphis-Arkansas commission that oversaw the construction of the Memphis & Arkansas Bridge, originally (1949) at the end of Crump Boulevard but now part of Interstate 55.
- The lyrics to "The Memphis Blues" by composer and bandleader W. C. Handy mention "Mr. Crump." The song was published in 1912, but may have originated during Crump's 1909 mayoral campaign.
- Crump is the subject of the later song, "Mr Crump Don't Like It", likely written by Frank Stokes and Dan Sane and recorded by Fulton Allen (Blind Boy Fuller), among others, including The Rigmarollers.
- The lyrics to "Motel in Memphis" by Old Crow Medicine Show also mention "Mr. Crump" and his involvement in the political machine that shaped the city.
- Crump appointed Lloyd Binford to be head of the Memphis Censor Board which governed approval and editing of movies, a position he maintained with Crump's support from 1928–1955. Binford imposed harsh and erratic censorship during his era, leading Memphis to have a different selection of movies available than any other part of America. Among Binford's objections included movies with train robberies, movies that showed blacks and whites together at any time, movies that included actors of whom he disapproved, and other quibbles. Theaters in nearby towns would advertise that their movies were "banned in Memphis".
- One of Crump's Memphis society friends was Georgia Tann, who served as head of the Tennessee Children's Home Society. Historians generally believe that Crump saw Tann as most other respectable residents did - as a hard-working, dedicated social worker worthy of support and protection - but in reality, Tann performed unethical black market adoptions for fees, acquired many adoptees via misrepresentation and trickery to their birth parents, and let difficult-to-place orphans and wards simply die of malnutrition, conduct considered scandalous even for the era had it been more widely known.

== See also ==
- History of Tennessee
- Tom Pendergast

Political offices
Preceded by James H. Malone	Mayor of Memphis, Tennessee; 1910–1915	Succeeded by George C. Love
Preceded by S. Watkins Overton	Mayor of Memphis, Tennessee; 1940	Succeeded by Joseph Patrick Boyle
U.S. House of Representatives
Preceded by Hubert Fisher	Member of the U.S. House of Representatives from Tennessee's 10th congressional district 1931–1933	District eliminated after 1930 Census
Preceded by Jere Cooper	Member of the U.S. House of Representatives from Tennessee's 9th congressional district 1933–1935	Succeeded by Walter Chandler
