= 1924 United States Senate election in Tennessee =

- November 4, 1924
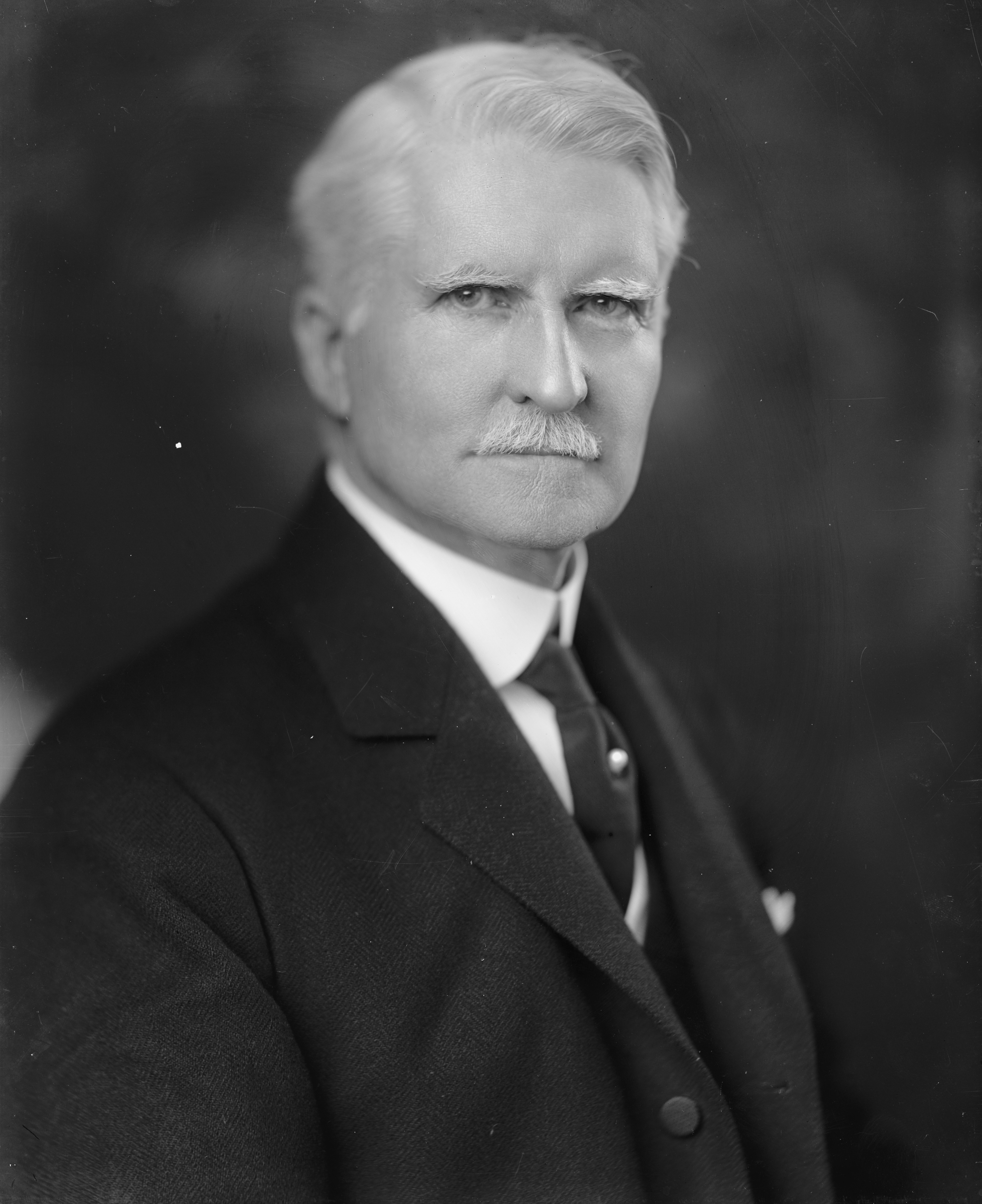

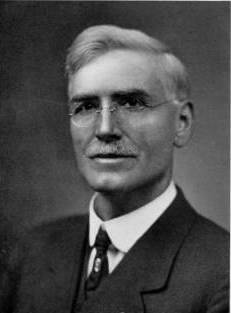
Nominee	Lawrence Tyson	Hugh B. Lindsay
Party	Democratic	Republican
Popular vote	147,871	109,859
Percentage	57.32%	42.59%
- County results Tyson: 50–60% 60–70% 70–80% 80–90% >90% Lindsay: 50–60% 60–70% 70–80% 80–90% >90%
Senator before election
John K. Shields
Democratic
Elected Senator
Lawrence Tyson
Democratic

The 1924 United States Senate election in Tennessee took place on November 4, 1924, concurrently with the U.S. presidential election, as well as elections to the United States Senate in other states as well as elections to the United States House of Representatives and various state and local elections. Incumbent Democratic Senator John K. Shields was defeated in the primary to Lawrence Tyson. Tyson won the general election, defeating Republican Attorney Hugh B. Lindsay with 57.3% of the vote.

Lawrence Tyson was sworn in as a Senator on March 4, 1925.

== Democratic primary ==
=== Candidates ===
- John K. Shields, incumbent senator
- Lawrence Tyson, former Speaker of the Tennessee House of Representatives and former general over Tennessee National Guard troops
- Nathan L. Bachman, associate justice of the Tennessee Supreme Court (resigned in 1924 to run for the U.S. Senate).
- George L. Casey

=== Results ===
Democratic Party primary results
Party	Candidate	Votes	%
Democratic	Lawrence Tyson	72,496	41.85%
Democratic	John K. Shields (incumbent)	54,990	31.75%
Democratic	Nathan L. Bachman	44,946	25.95%
Democratic	George L. Casey	791	0.46%
Total votes		173,223	100.00%

== General election ==
General election results
Party	Candidate	Votes	%
Democratic	Lawrence Tyson	147,871	57.32%
Republican	Hugh B. Lindsay	109,859	42.59%
Independent	S. B. Williams	242	0.09%
Majority		38,012	14.73%
Turnout		257,972	
Democratic hold			

== See also ==
- 1924 United States presidential election in Tennessee
- 1924 Tennessee gubernatorial election
- 1924 United States Senate elections
