= 1918 Tennessee gubernatorial election =

- November 5, 1918
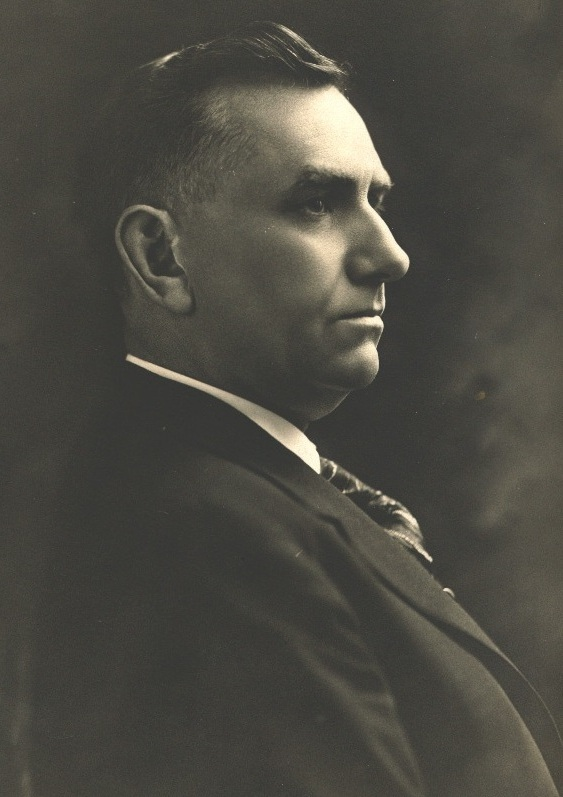

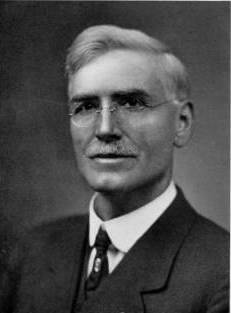
Nominee	Albert H. Roberts	Hugh B. Lindsay
Party	Democratic	Republican
Popular vote	98,628	59,518
Percentage	62.37%	37.64%
- County results Roberts: 50–60% 60–70% 70–80% 80–90% >90% Lindsay: 50–60% 60–70% 70–80% 80–90%
Governor before election
Thomas Clarke Rye
Democratic
Elected Governor
Albert H. Roberts
Democratic

The 1918 Tennessee gubernatorial election was held on November 5, to elect the next Governor of Temnessee, Democratic candidate Albert H. Roberts defeated Republican candidate Hugh B. Lindsay In the primary election, Roberts defeated Austin Peay narrowly by around 12,000 votes.

== Background ==
Roberts again sought the Democratic nomination for governor in hopes of succeeding Governor Rye, who was not running for re-election. His opponent for the nomination was former state legislator Austin Peay. Roberts gained the support of party bosses E. H. Crump, Hilary Howse, and Nashville Banner publisher E. B. Stahlman, and defeated Peay in the primary by 12,000 votes. In the general election, Roberts defeated Knoxville judge Hugh B. Lindsay, 98,628 (62.4%) votes to 59,518 (37.6%). Turnout is believed to have been influenced by that year's flu epidemic.

== General election ==
=== Candidates ===
- Albert H. Roberts, Democratic
- Hugh B. Lindsay, Republican

=== Results ===
1918 Tennessee gubernatorial election
Party	Candidate	Votes	%	±%
Democratic	Albert H. Roberts	98,628	62.37%	
Republican	Hugh B. Lindsay	59,518	37.64%	
Majority		39,110		
Turnout				
Democratic hold		Swing		

== See also ==
- 1918 United States Senate election in Tennessee
