= 1916 United States presidential election in Tennessee =

- November 7, 1916

All 12 Tennessee votes to the Electoral College

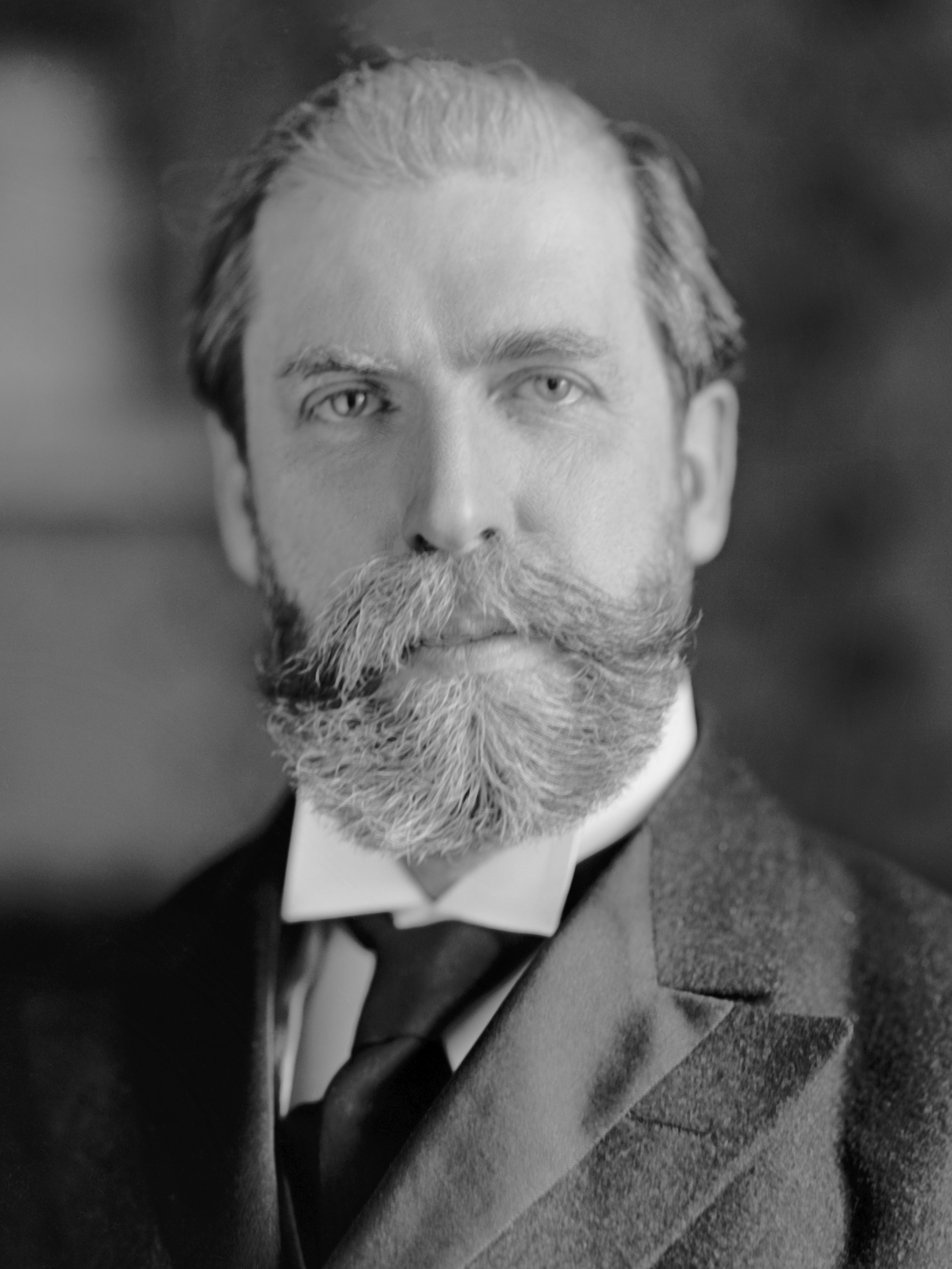
Nominee	Woodrow Wilson	Charles Evans Hughes
Party	Democratic	Republican
Home state	New Jersey	New York
Running mate	Thomas R. Marshall	Charles W. Fairbanks
Electoral vote	12	0
Popular vote	153,280	116,223
Percentage	56.31%	42.70%
County results
Wilson
50–60%
60–70%
70–80%
80–90%
90–100%
Hughes
40–50%
50–60%
60–70%
70–80%
80–90%
90–100%
President before election
Woodrow Wilson
Democratic
Elected President
Woodrow Wilson
Democratic

The 1916 United States presidential election in Tennessee was held on November 7, 1916. Tennessee voters chose twelve representatives, or electors, to the Electoral College, who voted for president and vice president.

For over a century after the Civil War, Tennessee was divided according to political loyalties established in that war. Unionist regions covering almost all of East Tennessee, Kentucky Pennyroyal-allied Macon County, and the five West Tennessee Highland Rim counties of Carroll, Henderson, McNairy, Hardin and Wayne voted Republican – generally by landslide margins – as they saw the Democratic Party as the “war party” who had forced them into a war they did not wish to fight. Contrariwise, the rest of Middle and West Tennessee who had supported and driven the state's secession was equally fiercely Democratic as it associated the Republicans with Reconstruction. After the disfranchisement of the state's African-American population by a poll tax was largely complete in the 1890s, the Democratic Party was certain of winning statewide elections if united, although unlike the Deep South Republicans would almost always gain thirty to forty percent of the statewide vote from mountain and Highland Rim support.

In the early 1910s, the state Democratic Party was divided over the issue of prohibition. One faction, known as the “Independent Democrats,” wanted the state's Four Mile Law (which banned the sale of liquor within four miles of any school) to apply statewide, while the other faction, known as the “Regular Democrats,” wanted the state's larger cities to be exempt from this law. In 1910, the Independent Democrats fled the party and formed a coalition, known as the “Fusionists,” with Republicans, helping to elect Governor Ben W. Hooper, although the Republicans did not gain at other levels. With the divisions within the Democratic Party temporarily healed in 1914, the major state issue was the control of Memphis political boss E. H. Crump, who had been arrested and ousted from power for violating state prohibition laws.

Although Tennessee had not voted for a Republican presidential candidate since 1868, Republican nominee Charles Evans Hughes did visit the state – becoming the first Republican nominee to ever visit Nashville – during the first week of September. Democratic incumbent Woodrow Wilson did not visit the state.

No polls were taken in Tennessee until the end of October, when President Wilson was given a clear lead, which led Hughes to concede the state. Later polls early in November confirmed this view, giving Wilson a five-to-four lead over the whole state. As it turned out, Wilson won by more than the poll had suggested, and improved by six points upon the margins achieved by Alton B. Parker in 1904 and William Jennings Bryan in 1908.

== Results ==
Presidential Candidate	Running Mate	Party	Electoral Vote (EV)	Popular Vote (PV)	
Woodrow Wilson of New Jersey	Thomas R. Marshall	Democratic	12	153,280	56.31%
Charles Evans Hughes	Charles W. Fairbanks	Republican	0	116,223	42.70%
Allan L. Benson	George R. Kirkpatrick	Socialist	0	2,542	0.93%
Frank Hanly	Ira Landrith	Prohibition	0	145	0.05%

=== Results by county ===
1916 United States presidential election in Tennessee by county
County	Woodrow Wilson Democratic		Charles Evans Hughes Republican		Allan L. Benson Socialist		Frank Hanly Prohibition		Margin		Total votes cast
County	#	%	#	%	#	%	#	%	#	%	Total votes cast
Anderson	537	23.49%	1,730	75.68%	19	0.83%	0	0.00%	-1,193	-52.19%	2,286
Bedford	2,578	66.05%	1,324	33.92%	0	0.00%	1	0.03%	1,254	32.13%	3,903
Benton	1,313	61.30%	805	37.58%	24	1.12%	0	0.00%	508	23.72%	2,142
Bledsoe	423	38.32%	681	61.68%	0	0.00%	0	0.00%	-258	-23.37%	1,104
Blount	1,015	29.03%	2,462	70.42%	1	0.03%	18	0.51%	-1,447	-41.39%	3,496
Bradley	784	34.24%	1,482	64.72%	18	0.79%	6	0.26%	-698	-30.48%	2,290
Campbell	485	22.04%	1,670	75.87%	46	2.09%	0	0.00%	-1,185	-53.84%	2,201
Cannon	936	67.24%	456	32.76%	0	0.00%	0	0.00%	480	34.48%	1,392
Carroll	2,001	46.98%	2,217	52.05%	40	0.94%	1	0.02%	-216	-5.07%	4,259
Carter	498	14.40%	2,961	85.60%	0	0.00%	0	0.00%	-2,463	-71.21%	3,459
Cheatham	1,117	71.51%	439	28.10%	6	0.38%	0	0.00%	678	43.41%	1,562
Chester	862	55.65%	645	41.64%	42	2.71%	0	0.00%	217	14.01%	1,549
Claiborne	1,053	42.63%	1,398	56.60%	19	0.77%	0	0.00%	-345	-13.97%	2,470
Clay	689	53.62%	578	44.98%	17	1.32%	1	0.08%	111	8.64%	1,285
Cocke	595	28.52%	1,478	70.85%	13	0.62%	0	0.00%	-883	-42.33%	2,086
Coffee	1,837	78.30%	489	20.84%	20	0.85%	0	0.00%	1,348	57.46%	2,346
Crockett	1,608	58.43%	1,144	41.57%	0	0.00%	0	0.00%	464	16.86%	2,752
Cumberland	428	31.59%	924	68.19%	3	0.22%	0	0.00%	-496	-36.61%	1,355
Davidson	8,958	72.71%	3,168	25.71%	194	1.57%	0	0.00%	5,790	47.00%	12,320
Decatur	887	49.36%	893	49.69%	17	0.95%	0	0.00%	-6	-0.33%	1,797
DeKalb	1,407	50.98%	1,343	48.66%	10	0.36%	0	0.00%	64	2.32%	2,760
Dickson	2,105	66.74%	1,008	31.96%	40	1.27%	1	0.03%	1,097	34.78%	3,154
Dyer	1,997	80.14%	459	18.42%	36	1.44%	0	0.00%	1,538	61.72%	2,492
Fayette	1,812	93.89%	116	6.01%	2	0.10%	0	0.00%	1,696	87.88%	1,930
Fentress	348	26.36%	925	70.08%	44	3.33%	3	0.23%	-577	-43.71%	1,320
Franklin	2,469	76.32%	711	21.98%	55	1.70%	0	0.00%	1,758	54.34%	3,235
Gibson	3,609	71.13%	1,443	28.44%	22	0.43%	0	0.00%	2,166	42.69%	5,074
Giles	3,207	68.22%	1,488	31.65%	5	0.11%	1	0.02%	1,719	36.57%	4,701
Grainger	843	35.49%	1,529	64.38%	0	0.00%	3	0.13%	-686	-28.88%	2,375
Greene	2,254	42.46%	3,055	57.54%	0	0.00%	0	0.00%	-801	-15.09%	5,309
Grundy	736	63.56%	319	27.55%	103	8.89%	0	0.00%	417	36.01%	1,158
Hamblen	741	47.29%	795	50.73%	31	1.98%	0	0.00%	-54	-3.45%	1,567
Hamilton	5,828	54.17%	4,697	43.66%	156	1.45%	78	0.72%	1,131	10.51%	10,759
Hancock	386	23.90%	1,229	76.10%	0	0.00%	0	0.00%	-843	-52.20%	1,615
Hardeman	1,724	77.80%	485	21.89%	7	0.32%	0	0.00%	1,239	55.91%	2,216
Hardin	979	34.96%	1,811	64.68%	10	0.36%	0	0.00%	-832	-29.71%	2,800
Hawkins	1,142	39.42%	1,739	60.03%	16	0.55%	0	0.00%	-597	-20.61%	2,897
Haywood	1,677	95.88%	61	3.49%	11	0.63%	0	0.00%	1,616	92.40%	1,749
Henderson	979	40.74%	1,387	57.72%	37	1.54%	0	0.00%	-408	-16.98%	2,403
Henry	2,988	67.19%	1,393	31.32%	60	1.35%	6	0.13%	1,595	35.87%	4,447
Hickman	1,479	58.46%	1,026	40.55%	25	0.99%	0	0.00%	453	17.91%	2,530
Houston	627	71.49%	207	23.60%	42	4.79%	1	0.11%	420	47.89%	877
Humphreys	1,148	71.00%	452	27.95%	17	1.05%	0	0.00%	696	43.04%	1,617
Jackson	1,506	67.05%	740	32.95%	0	0.00%	0	0.00%	766	34.11%	2,246
James	230	27.51%	606	72.49%	0	0.00%	0	0.00%	-376	-44.98%	836
Jefferson	520	23.93%	1,648	75.84%	5	0.23%	0	0.00%	-1,128	-51.91%	2,173
Johnson	263	12.67%	1,812	87.33%	0	0.00%	0	0.00%	-1,549	-74.65%	2,075
Knox	4,214	41.68%	5,791	57.27%	106	1.05%	0	0.00%	-1,577	-15.60%	10,111
Lake	727	83.66%	130	14.96%	12	1.38%	0	0.00%	597	68.70%	869
Lauderdale	1,572	74.64%	532	25.26%	2	0.09%	0	0.00%	1,040	49.38%	2,106
Lawrence	1,787	49.17%	1,837	50.55%	10	0.28%	0	0.00%	-50	-1.38%	3,634
Lewis	387	47.96%	414	51.30%	6	0.74%	0	0.00%	-27	-3.35%	807
Lincoln	2,791	83.14%	552	16.44%	10	0.30%	4	0.12%	2,239	66.70%	3,357
Loudon	423	37.63%	698	62.10%	3	0.27%	0	0.00%	-275	-24.47%	1,124
Macon	980	37.98%	1,600	62.02%	0	0.00%	0	0.00%	-620	-24.03%	2,580
Madison	2,659	67.78%	1,194	30.44%	70	1.78%	0	0.00%	1,465	37.34%	3,923
Marion	1,155	43.73%	1,432	54.22%	54	2.04%	0	0.00%	-277	-10.49%	2,641
Marshall	1,652	77.41%	461	21.60%	21	0.98%	0	0.00%	1,191	55.81%	2,134
Maury	2,169	74.13%	720	24.61%	37	1.26%	0	0.00%	1,449	49.52%	2,926
McMinn	1,088	38.66%	1,726	61.34%	0	0.00%	0	0.00%	-638	-22.67%	2,814
McNairy	1,461	47.47%	1,616	52.50%	1	0.03%	0	0.00%	-155	-5.04%	3,078
Meigs	541	47.04%	608	52.87%	1	0.09%	0	0.00%	-67	-5.83%	1,150
Monroe	1,263	46.08%	1,459	53.23%	19	0.69%	0	0.00%	-196	-7.15%	2,741
Montgomery	1,976	65.45%	991	32.83%	52	1.72%	0	0.00%	985	32.63%	3,019
Moore	722	91.05%	71	8.95%	0	0.00%	0	0.00%	651	82.09%	793
Morgan	563	30.14%	1,265	67.72%	40	2.14%	0	0.00%	-702	-37.58%	1,868
Obion	3,170	83.64%	591	15.59%	29	0.77%	0	0.00%	2,579	68.05%	3,790
Overton	1,512	58.40%	1,030	39.78%	47	1.82%	0	0.00%	482	18.62%	2,589
Perry	663	57.60%	483	41.96%	5	0.43%	0	0.00%	180	15.64%	1,151
Pickett	418	45.48%	501	54.52%	0	0.00%	0	0.00%	-83	-9.03%	919
Polk	767	45.90%	887	53.08%	17	1.02%	0	0.00%	-120	-7.18%	1,671
Putnam	2,300	62.38%	1,383	37.51%	2	0.05%	2	0.05%	917	24.87%	3,687
Rhea	661	45.27%	768	52.60%	31	2.12%	0	0.00%	-107	-7.33%	1,460
Roane	667	32.16%	1,341	64.66%	66	3.18%	0	0.00%	-674	-32.50%	2,074
Robertson	2,106	72.05%	733	25.08%	82	2.81%	2	0.07%	1,373	46.97%	2,923
Rutherford	2,941	72.49%	1,116	27.51%	0	0.00%	0	0.00%	1,825	44.98%	4,057
Scott	206	11.40%	1,486	82.24%	101	5.59%	14	0.77%	-1,280	-70.84%	1,807
Sequatchie	335	57.86%	238	41.11%	6	1.04%	0	0.00%	97	16.75%	579
Sevier	301	9.59%	2,837	90.38%	1	0.03%	0	0.00%	-2,536	-80.79%	3,139
Shelby	10,967	69.92%	4,515	28.79%	202	1.29%	0	0.00%	6,452	41.14%	15,684
Smith	2,196	69.96%	941	29.98%	0	0.00%	2	0.06%	1,255	39.98%	3,139
Stewart	1,711	73.12%	591	25.26%	38	1.62%	0	0.00%	1,120	47.86%	2,340
Sullivan	2,601	59.33%	1,776	40.51%	7	0.16%	0	0.00%	825	18.82%	4,384
Sumner	2,487	78.33%	612	19.28%	76	2.39%	0	0.00%	1,875	59.06%	3,175
Tipton	2,035	85.47%	281	11.80%	65	2.73%	0	0.00%	1,754	73.67%	2,381
Trousdale	688	76.02%	217	23.98%	0	0.00%	0	0.00%	471	52.04%	905
Unicoi	226	19.04%	961	80.96%	0	0.00%	0	0.00%	-735	-61.92%	1,187
Union	389	20.65%	1,490	79.09%	4	0.21%	1	0.05%	-1,101	-58.44%	1,884
Van Buren	405	71.30%	151	26.58%	12	2.11%	0	0.00%	254	44.72%	568
Warren	1,855	74.26%	624	24.98%	19	0.76%	0	0.00%	1,231	49.28%	2,498
Washington	1,831	40.14%	2,723	59.69%	8	0.18%	0	0.00%	-892	-19.55%	4,562
Wayne	517	23.94%	1,626	75.28%	17	0.79%	0	0.00%	-1,109	-51.34%	2,160
Weakley	3,609	67.04%	1,768	32.84%	6	0.11%	0	0.00%	1,841	34.20%	5,383
White	1,407	69.38%	587	28.94%	34	1.68%	0	0.00%	820	40.43%	2,028
Williamson	2,036	76.95%	600	22.68%	10	0.38%	0	0.00%	1,436	54.27%	2,646
Wilson	2,535	75.09%	841	24.91%	0	0.00%	0	0.00%	1,694	50.18%	3,376
Totals	153,280	56.31%	116,223	42.70%	2,542	0.93%	145	0.05%	37,057	13.61%	272,190

== See also ==
- 1916 United States Senate election in Tennessee
- 1916 Tennessee gubernatorial election
