= 1934 Tennessee gubernatorial election =

- November 6, 1934
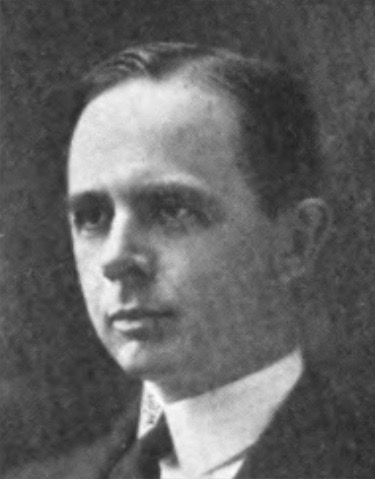

Nominee	Hill McAlister	Lewis S. Pope
Party	Democratic	Independent
Popular vote	198,743	122,965
Percentage	61.78%	38.22%
- County results McAlister: 40–50% 50–60% 60–70% 70–80% 80–90% >90% Pope: 50–60% 60–70% 70–80%
Governor before election
Hill McAlister
Democratic
Elected Governor
Hill McAlister
Democratic

The 1934 Tennessee gubernatorial election was held on November 6, 1934. Incumbent Democratic governor Hill McAlister won re-election to a second term, defeating Independent nominee Lewis S. Pope in a rematch with 61.8% of the vote.

Lewis S. Pope again challenged McAlister for the Democratic nomination, but came up short, winning just 137,253 votes to McAlister's 191,460.

In the general election, Pope once again ran as an independent, and tried to form a fusion ticket with former Republican governor Ben W. Hooper who was running for Senate. Hooper called on Republicans to support Pope in the gubernatorial election, while Pope called on independent Democrats to support Hooper in his Senate campaign against Kenneth McKellar. The plan failed, however, with Pope losing to McAlister in the general election, and McKellar soundly defeating Hooper in the Senate race.

== Primary elections ==
Primary elections were held on August 2, 1934.

=== Democratic primary ===
==== Candidates ====
- Hill McAlister, incumbent governor
- Lewis S. Pope

==== Results ====
Democratic primary results
Party	Candidate	Votes	%
Democratic	Hill McAlister (incumbent)	191,460	58.25%
Democratic	Lewis S. Pope	137,253	41.76%
Total votes		328,713	100.00%

== General election ==
=== Candidates ===
- Hill McAlister, Democratic
- Lewis S. Pope, Independent

=== Results ===
1934 Tennessee gubernatorial election
Party	Candidate	Votes	%	±%
Democratic	Hill McAlister (incumbent)	198,743	61.78%	+19.03%
Independent	Lewis S. Pope	122,965	38.22%	+11.17%
Majority		75,778		
Turnout				
Democratic hold		Swing		

== See also ==
- 1934 United States Senate election in Tennessee
- 1934 United States Senate special election in Tennessee
