= 1934 United States Senate election in Tennessee =

- November 6, 1934
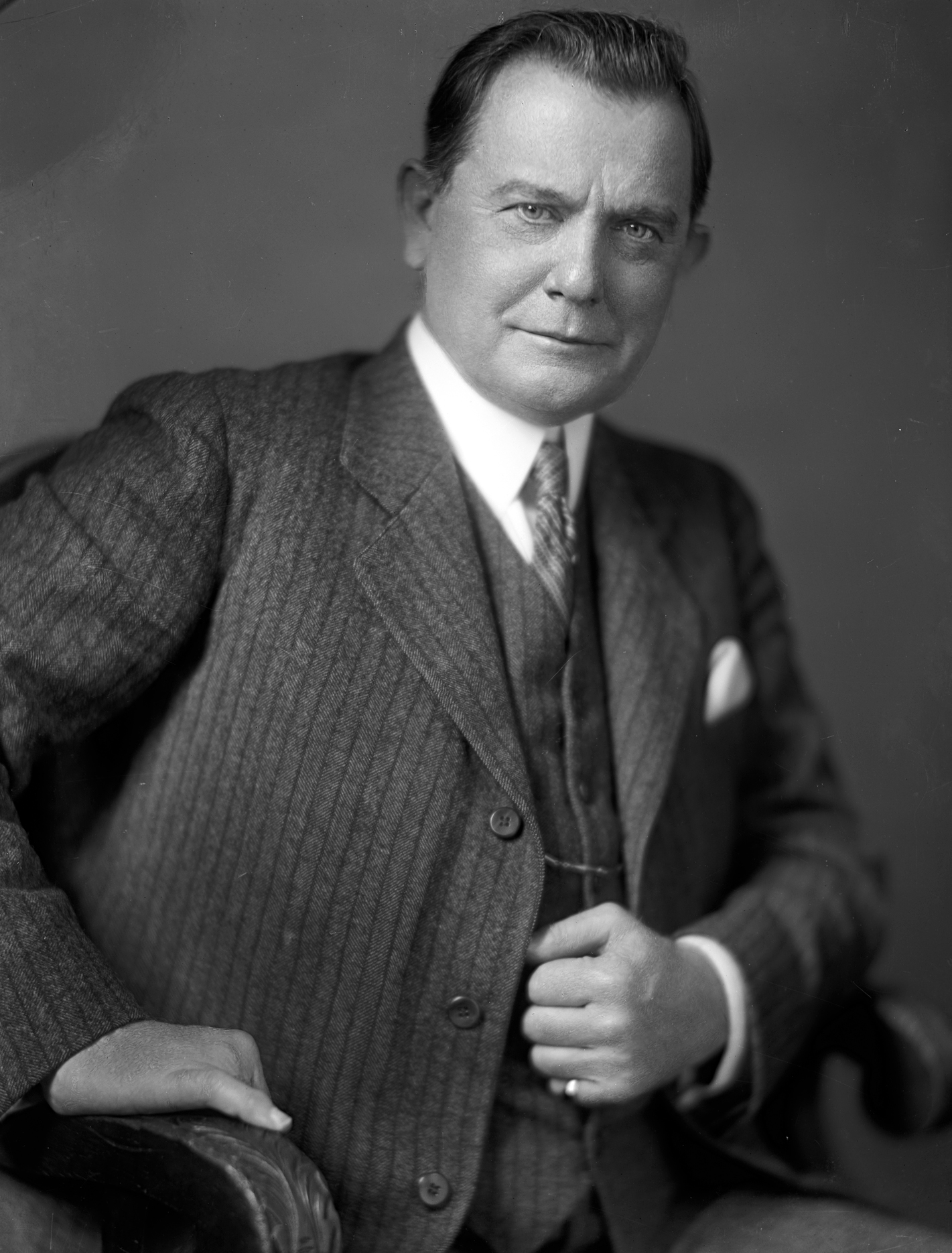

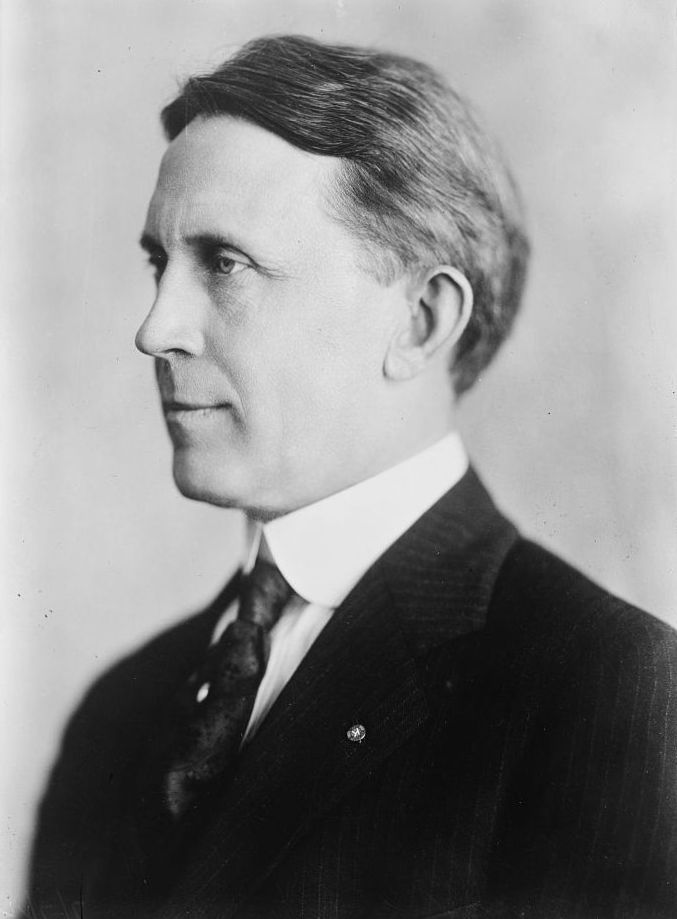
Nominee	Kenneth McKellar	Ben W. Hooper
Party	Democratic	Republican
Popular vote	195,430	110,401
Percentage	63.40%	35.81%
- County results McKellar: 50–60% 60–70% 70–80% 80–90% >90% Hooper: 40–50% 50–60% 60–70% 70–80%
U.S. senator before election
Kenneth McKellar
Democratic
Elected U.S. senator
Kenneth McKellar
Democratic

The 1934 United States Senate election in Tennessee was held on November 5, 1934. Incumbent Democratic Senator Kenneth D. McKellar was re-elected to a fourth term in office, defeating Republican former Governor Ben W. Hooper in a rematch from 1916.

Ben W. Hooper attempted to build a fusion ticket with independent gubernatorial candidate Lewis S. Pope. Hooper called on Republicans to support Pope in the gubernatorial election, while Pope urged independent Democrats to support Hooper in his Senate campaign. The effort ultimately failed, however, with McKellar defeating Hooper in the Senate race while Pope lost the gubernatorial election to incumbent Democratic governor Hill McAlister.

== Democratic primary ==
=== Candidates ===
- Kenneth McKellar, incumbent Senator since 1917
- John Randolph Neal Jr., attorney, academic, and perennial candidate

=== Results ===
1934 Democratic Senate primary
Party	Candidate	Votes	%
Democratic	Kenneth McKellar (incumbent)	212,226	83.99%
Democratic	John Randolph Neal Jr.	40,463	16.01%
Total votes		252,689	100.00%

== General election ==
=== Candidates ===
- Ben W. Hooper, former Governor of Tennessee (1911–15) (Republican)
- Kenneth McKellar, incumbent Senator since 1917 (Democratic)
- C. W. Hoisington (Independent)

=== Results ===
1934 U.S. Senate election in Tennessee
Party	Candidate	Votes	%	±%
Democratic	Kenneth McKellar (incumbent)	195,430	63.40%	▲4.08
Republican	Ben W. Hooper	110,401	35.81%	▼4.85
Independent	C. W. Hoisington	2,443	0.79%	N/A
Total votes		308,274	100.00%	N/A
Democratic hold				

== See also ==
- 1934 United States Senate elections
- 1934 Tennessee gubernatorial election
