= 1916 Tennessee gubernatorial election =

- November 7, 1916
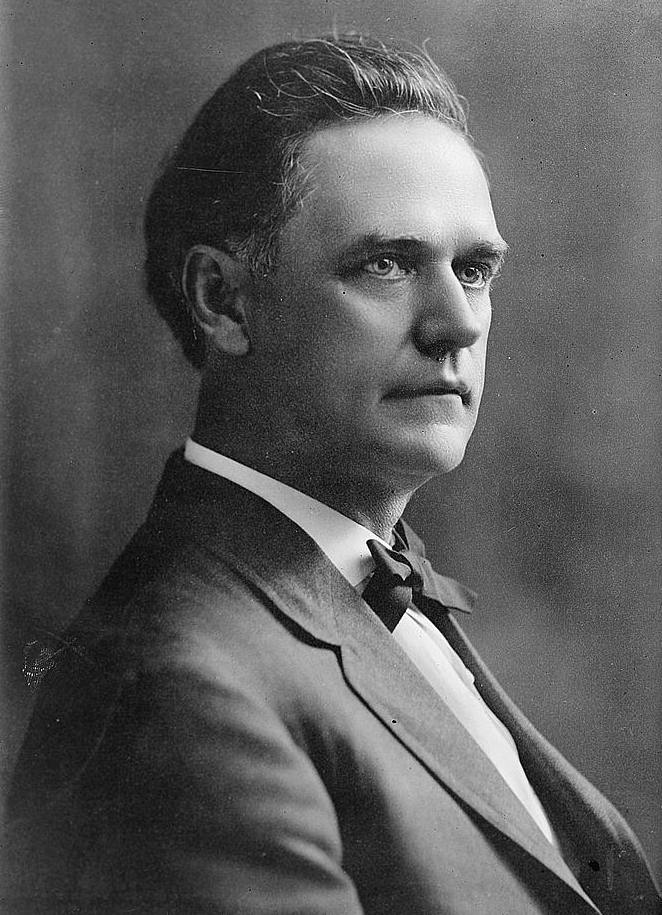

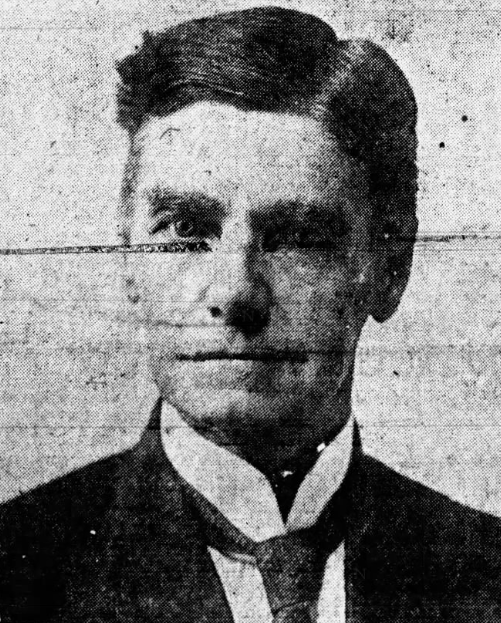
Nominee	Thomas Clarke Rye	John W. Overall
Party	Democratic	Republican
Popular vote	146,759	117,819
Percentage	55.04%	44.19%
- County results Rye: 50–60% 60–70% 70–80% 80–90% >90% Overall: 40–50% 50–60% 60–70% 70–80% 80–90% >90%
Governor before election
Thomas Clarke Rye
Democratic
Elected Governor
Thomas Clarke Rye
Democratic

The 1916 Tennessee gubernatorial election was held on November 7, 1916. Incumbent Democratic governor Thomas Clarke Rye defeated Republican nominee John W. Overall with 55.04% of the vote.

== General election ==
=== Candidates ===
- Thomas Clarke Rye, Democratic
- John W. Overall, Republican
- L. A. Wiles, Socialist

=== Results ===
1916 Tennessee gubernatorial election
Party	Candidate	Votes	%	±%
Democratic	Thomas Clarke Rye (incumbent)	146,759	55.04%	
Republican	John W. Overall	117,819	44.19%	
Socialist	L. A. Wiles	2,070	0.78%	
Majority		28,940		
Turnout				
Democratic hold		Swing		

== See also ==
- 1916 United States presidential election in Tennessee
- 1916 United States Senate election in Tennessee
