= Thomas Clarke Rye =

American politician

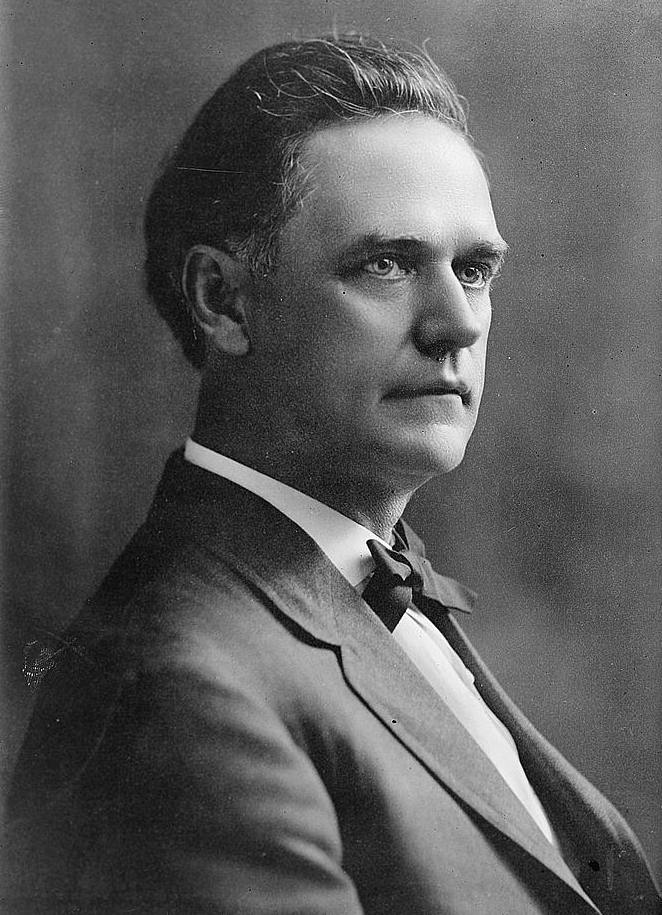

32nd Governor of Tennessee
- In office January 17, 1915 – January 15, 1919
- Preceded by: Ben W. Hooper
- Succeeded by: Albert H. Roberts

Personal details
- Born: June 2, 1863 Benton County, Tennessee
- Died: September 12, 1953 (aged 90) Paris, Tennessee
- Resting place: Maplewood Cemetery, Paris, Tennessee
- Party: Democratic
- Spouse: Bettie Arnold (m. 1887)
- Profession: Attorney

Thomas Clarke Rye (June 2, 1863 – September 12, 1953) was an American politician who served as the 32nd governor of Tennessee from 1915 to 1919. An ardent supporter of prohibition of alcoholic beverages, he helped reunify the state's Democratic Party, which had been divided over the issue for nearly a decade. Rye is perhaps best remembered for enacting the "Ouster Law," which was aimed at curbing the power of political boss E. H. Crump.

== Early life ==
Rye was born in Benton County, Tennessee, the son of Wayne Rye, a merchant, and Elizabeth (Atchison) Rye. He was educated at local schools, and read law under his uncle, Colonel Tom Morris, in nearby Charlotte, Tennessee. In 1884, after his admission to the bar, he moved to Camden, Tennessee, to practice law. During the 1890s, he served as circuit master of Camden's chancery court, and worked for several years as a pension agent in Washington, D. C. In 1902, Rye moved to Paris, Tennessee, where he established a law partnership with W.W. Farquard.

Rye served as District Attorney for the Thirteenth Judicial District from 1910 to 1914. He quickly gained a reputation as the state's most "stringent" law enforcement agent, and was described as a "terror to the bootleggers and dispensers of whisky."

== Governor ==
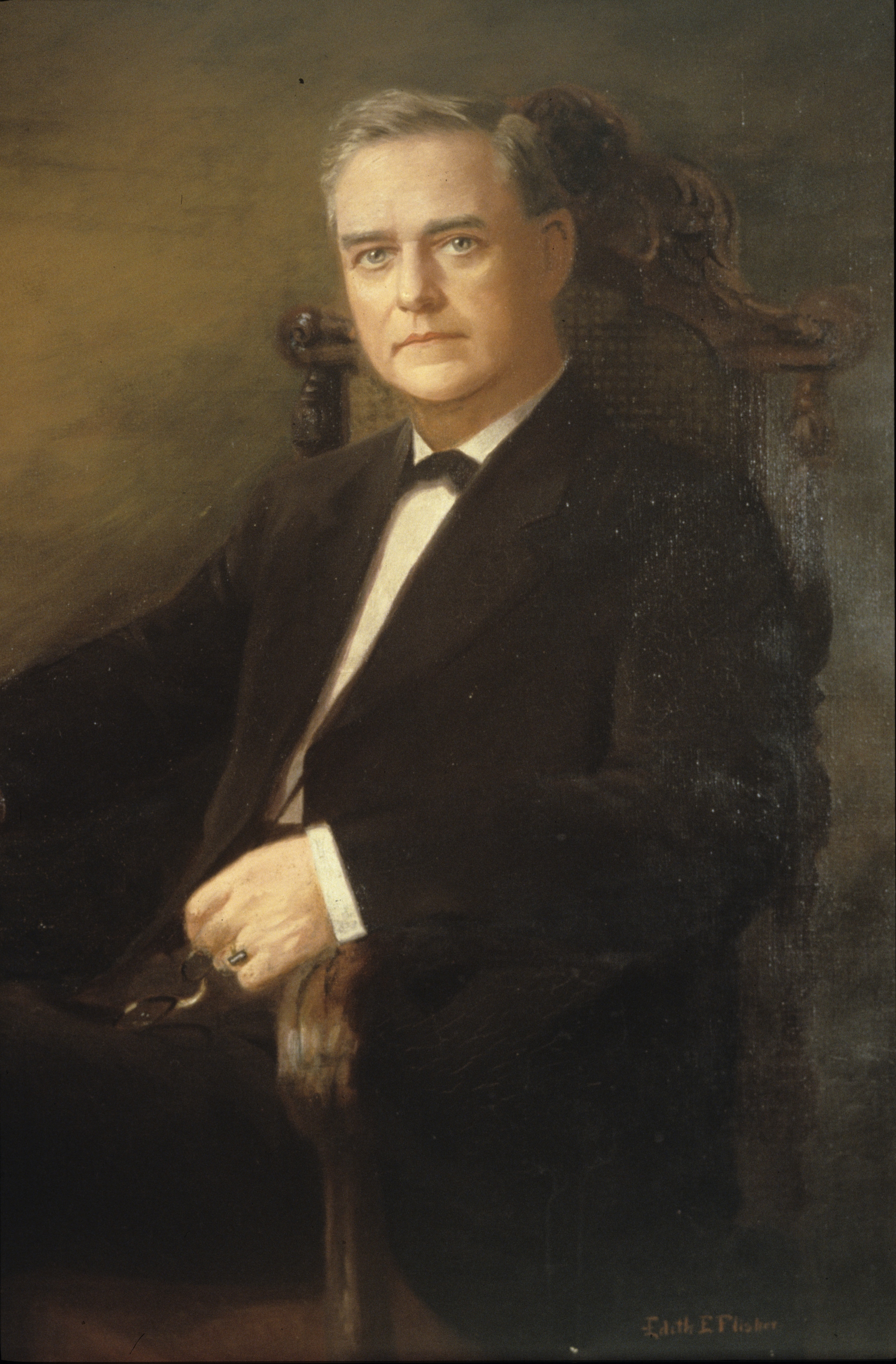
Portrait of Governor Rye

In the early 1910s, the state Democratic Party was divided over the issue of prohibition. One faction, known as the "Independent Democrats," wanted the state's Four Mile Law (which banned the sale of liquor within four miles of any school) to apply statewide, while the other faction, known as the "Regular Democrats," wanted the state's larger cities to be exempt from the law. In 1910, the Independent Democrats fled the party and formed a coalition, known as the "Fusionists," with Republicans, helping to elect Governor Ben W. Hooper.

At its May convention in 1914, the Democratic Party added statewide prohibition to the party's platform, all but ending the rift between Regular and Independent Democratics. Rye, well known among supporters of prohibition, received the endorsements of Senator Luke Lea and former Governor Malcolm R. Patterson, and was nominated as the party's candidate. With the party once again unified, Rye defeated Hooper 137,656 votes to 116,667. Hooper accused Memphis political boss E.H. Crump of fixing the vote in Shelby County, but no investigation was launched.

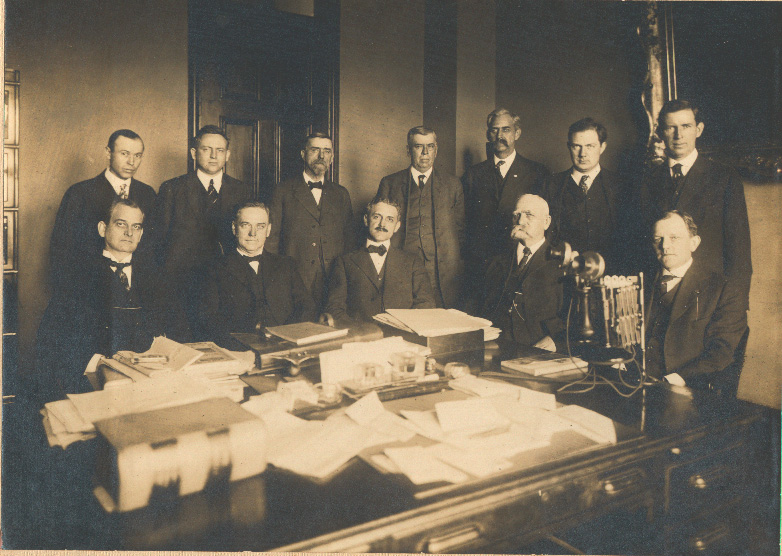
Governor Rye (seated, second from the left) and his staff

During his first term, Rye enacted the so-called "Ouster Law," which allowed for the removal of public officials for incompetence or unwillingness to enforce the law. This law was aimed primarily at Crump, who as Mayor of Memphis had refused to enforce prohibition in the city. The state attorney general filed a suit removing Crump in October 1915. When the Tennessee Supreme Court upheld the action, the Rye administration proceeded to purge any official who refused to enforce prohibition, among them District Attorney Newton Estes and Judge Jesse Edgington of Memphis, as well as several officials in Nashville (including Mayor Hilary Howse) and Knoxville.

Rye's administration created the State Highway Department (the modern Tennessee Department of Transportation) in 1915. He signed legislation requiring automobile registration, and implemented a state highway tax to match federal funding. In April 1915, Rye attended a meeting of the Dixie Highway Association, where he helped set the route of the Dixie Highway, an early tourist road connecting the Midwestern states with Florida.

In March 1915, Rye signed legislation chartering Tennessee Polytechnic Institute (modern Tennessee Technological University) in Cookeville. During his tenure, he expanded the state's Board of Education, and implemented a tax to support schools.

In the governor's race of 1916, Republicans nominated John W. Overall, a U.S. marshal from Liberty, Tennessee. Rye defeated Overall by a vote of 146,758 to 117,817.

During Rye's second term, the United States entered World War I. Over 80,000 Tennesseans entered the United States Armed Forces, and more of them were deployed overseas than ever before in Tennessee history. The number of Tennesseans was the most ever serving actively in the military up to that time except for the number serving in Confederate forces during the Civil War.

In 1917, Rye enacted legislation that implemented a primary for selecting candidates for state offices from the Democratic and Republican parties (candidates were previously selected by delegates at party conventions). The debate over primaries had divided the Democratic Party since the 1910 elections.

Various labor laws were also introduced during Rye's tenure as governor.

== Later life ==
At the end of his second term, Rye did not seek reelection. He instead ran for the U.S. Senate seat held by John K. Shields. Shields, who had been elected to the seat by the state legislature prior to the passage of the 17th Amendment (which established direct election of senators), had angered President Woodrow Wilson by opposing the League of Nations, and Wilson threatened to endorse Rye. Senator Kenneth McKellar convinced the president to withhold his endorsement in return for Shields' support for the League, however, and Shields defeated Rye for the nomination.

After losing the Senate nomination, Rye returned to Paris to practice law. In 1922, he was appointed chancellor (judge) of the state's Eighth Judicial District. He remained in this position for nearly two decades.

Rye died in Paris on September 12, 1953, and was buried in the city's Maplewood Cemetery. At the time of his death, he became the second longest-lived governor in Tennessee history at the age of 90 years and 3 months. Governor John I. Cox was the longest at 90 years, 9 months. In April 2018, Winfield Dunn (b. July 1927) broke Cox's longevity record and as of July 2019, has surpassed his 92nd birthday, and now Rye is the third longest-lived governor in state history.

== Family ==
Rye was descended from Irish immigrants. He married Bettie Arnold in 1887. They had a daughter, Nell, and a son, Paul.

== See also ==
- List of governors of Tennessee

Party political offices
Preceded by Benton McMillin	Democratic nominee for Governor of Tennessee; 1914, 1916	Succeeded by Albert H. Roberts
Political offices
Preceded by Ben W. Hooper	Governor of Tennessee; 1915-1919	Succeeded by Albert H. Roberts
