= 1936 United States presidential election in Tennessee =

- November 3, 1936

All 11 Tennessee votes to the Electoral College

Nominee	Franklin D. Roosevelt	Alf Landon
Party	Democratic	Republican
Home state	New York	Kansas
Running mate	John Nance Garner	Frank Knox
Electoral vote	11	0
Popular vote	327,083	146,520
Percentage	68.78%	30.81%
County results
Roosevelt
50–60%
60–70%
70–80%
80–90%
90–100%
Landon
50–60%
60–70%
70–80%
80–90%
President before election
Franklin D. Roosevelt
Democratic
Elected President
Franklin D. Roosevelt
Democratic

The 1936 United States presidential election in Tennessee took place on November 3, 1936, as part of the 1936 United States presidential election. Tennessee voters chose 11 representatives, or electors, to the Electoral College, who voted for president and vice president.

For over a century after the Civil War, Tennessee was divided according to political loyalties established in that war. Unionist regions covering almost all of East Tennessee, Kentucky Pennyroyal-allied Macon County, and the five West Tennessee Highland Rim counties of Carroll, Henderson, McNairy, Hardin and Wayne voted Republican – generally by landslide margins – as they saw the Democratic Party as the "war party" who had forced them into a war they did not wish to fight. Contrariwise, the rest of Middle and West Tennessee who had supported and driven the state's secession was equally fiercely Democratic as it associated the Republicans with Reconstruction. After the disfranchisement of the state's African-American population by a poll tax was largely complete in the 1890s, the Democratic Party was certain of winning statewide elections if united, although unlike the Deep South Republicans would almost always gain thirty to forty percent of the statewide vote from mountain and Highland Rim support.

In 1920 by moving into a small number of traditionally Democratic areas in Middle Tennessee and expanding turnout due to the Nineteenth Amendment and powerful isolationist sentiment, the Republican Party captured Tennessee's presidential electoral votes and won the governorship and three congressional seats in addition to the rock-ribbed GOP First and Second Districts. In 1922 and 1924, with the ebbing of isolationist sympathy and a consequent decline in turnout, the Democratic Party regained Tennessee's governorship and presidential electoral votes; however, in 1928 anti-Catholicism against Democratic nominee Al Smith in this powerfully fundamentalist state meant that Herbert Hoover bettered Harding's performance without however gaining the down-ballot coattails of 1920.

These Republican gains would be completely reversed in the 1930s due to the impact of the Great Depression, which was generally blamed upon the Republican Party's policies during the 1920s. Internal divisions prevented the Republicans taking advantage of a disputed Democratic gubernatorial primary in 1932 between Lewis Pope and Hill McAlister, and for the next third of a century the Republicans would rarely contest statewide offices seriously despite their continuing dominance of East Tennessee and half a dozen Unionist counties in the middle and west of the state. Statewide politics for the decade and a half from the beginning of the Depression would be dominated by Edward Hull “Boss” Crump, whose Memphis political machine would consistently provide decisive votes in statewide Democratic primaries — aided by cross-party voting by Republicans in eastern mountain counties. Crump would be supported during this era by long-serving Senator Kenneth Douglas McKellar. Polls always had incumbent President Franklin D. Roosevelt and Vice President John Nance Garner easily carrying the state against Republican nominees Governor Alf Landon of Kansas and Frank Knox. A mid-October Literary Digest poll had Roosevelt winning the state by a two-to-one margin. In the end Roosevelt received over 68 percent of the vote to Landon's 30.82 percent, surpassing the Digest forecast.

== Results ==
1936 United States presidential election in Tennessee
Party	Candidate	Votes	%
Democratic	Franklin D. Roosevelt (inc.)	327,083	68.78%
Republican	Alf Landon	146,520	30.81%
Socialist	Norman Thomas	686	0.14%
Prohibition	D. Leigh Colvin	634	0.13%
Communist	Earl Browder	319	0.07%
Union	William Lemke	296	0.06%

=== Results by county ===
1936 United States presidential election in Tennessee by county (Note: These figures differ from those in Dave Leip’s Atlas.)
County	Franklin D. Roosevelt Democratic		Alf Landon Republican		Norman Thomas Socialist		David L. Colvin Prohibition		Earl R. Browder Communist		William F. Lemke Union		Margin		Total votes cast
County	#	%	#	%	#	%	#	%	#	%	#	%	#	%	Total votes cast
Anderson	2,348	55.73%	1,805	42.84%	12	0.28%	47	1.12%	1	0.02%	0	0.00%	543	12.89%	4,213
Bedford	2,428	82.00%	514	17.36%	3	0.10%	12	0.41%	4	0.14%	0	0.00%	1,914	64.64%	2,961
Benton	1,762	72.54%	661	27.21%	1	0.04%	2	0.08%	3	0.12%	0	0.00%	1,101	45.33%	2,429
Bledsoe	1,218	50.35%	1,178	48.70%	16	0.66%	7	0.29%	0	0.00%	0	0.00%	40	1.65%	2,419
Blount	3,056	42.45%	4,119	57.22%	24	0.33%	0	0.00%	0	0.00%	0	0.00%	-1,063	-14.77%	7,199
Bradley	2,806	52.19%	2,561	47.64%	2	0.04%	5	0.09%	2	0.04%	0	0.00%	245	4.56%	5,376
Campbell	2,703	48.95%	2,814	50.96%	2	0.04%	3	0.05%	0	0.00%	0	0.00%	-111	-2.01%	5,522
Cannon	1,166	69.82%	498	29.82%	2	0.12%	1	0.06%	2	0.12%	1	0.06%	668	40.00%	1,670
Carroll	2,989	56.15%	2,282	42.87%	6	0.11%	12	0.23%	13	0.24%	21	0.39%	707	13.28%	5,323
Carter	1,837	27.33%	4,858	72.27%	27	0.40%	0	0.00%	0	0.00%	0	0.00%	-3,021	-44.94%	6,722
Cheatham	1,352	87.62%	183	11.86%	2	0.13%	6	0.39%	0	0.00%	0	0.00%	1,169	75.76%	1,543
Chester	1,172	67.20%	565	32.40%	1	0.06%	6	0.34%	0	0.00%	0	0.00%	607	34.81%	1,744
Claiborne	3,036	55.71%	2,400	44.04%	7	0.13%	7	0.13%	0	0.00%	0	0.00%	636	11.67%	5,450
Clay	661	62.42%	378	35.69%	6	0.57%	1	0.09%	13	1.23%	0	0.00%	283	26.72%	1,059
Cocke	1,217	24.57%	3,731	75.31%	1	0.02%	2	0.04%	3	0.06%	0	0.00%	-2,514	-50.75%	4,954
Coffee	2,148	83.58%	408	15.88%	4	0.16%	9	0.35%	1	0.04%	0	0.00%	1,740	67.70%	2,570
Crockett	1,921	78.41%	525	21.43%	1	0.04%	2	0.08%	1	0.04%	0	0.00%	1,396	56.98%	2,450
Cumberland	1,426	50.05%	1,409	49.46%	7	0.25%	7	0.25%	0	0.00%	0	0.00%	17	0.60%	2,849
Davidson	25,530	84.76%	4,467	14.83%	4	0.01%	37	0.12%	8	0.03%	73	0.24%	21,063	69.93%	30,119
Decatur	1,502	62.04%	919	37.96%	0	0.00%	0	0.00%	0	0.00%	0	0.00%	583	24.08%	2,421
DeKalb	2,947	57.73%	2,140	41.92%	2	0.04%	12	0.24%	4	0.08%	0	0.00%	807	15.81%	5,105
Dickson	2,022	82.97%	402	16.50%	8	0.33%	5	0.21%	0	0.00%	0	0.00%	1,620	66.48%	2,437
Dyer	3,355	83.90%	557	13.93%	9	0.23%	7	0.18%	11	0.28%	60	1.50%	2,798	69.97%	3,999
Fayette	1,764	98.38%	29	1.62%	0	0.00%	0	0.00%	0	0.00%	0	0.00%	1,735	96.77%	1,793
Fentress	743	35.20%	1,299	61.53%	43	2.04%	9	0.43%	17	0.81%	0	0.00%	-556	-26.34%	2,111
Franklin	3,534	86.92%	519	12.76%	2	0.05%	5	0.12%	2	0.05%	4	0.10%	3,015	74.15%	4,066
Gibson	4,744	82.79%	958	16.72%	5	0.09%	2	0.03%	21	0.37%	0	0.00%	3,786	66.07%	5,730
Giles	3,760	85.88%	600	13.70%	6	0.14%	10	0.23%	2	0.05%	0	0.00%	3,160	72.18%	4,378
Grainger	1,153	39.54%	1,754	60.15%	8	0.27%	1	0.03%	0	0.00%	0	0.00%	-601	-20.61%	2,916
Greene	4,708	51.98%	4,313	47.62%	16	0.18%	15	0.17%	5	0.06%	0	0.00%	395	4.36%	9,057
Grundy	1,488	86.01%	238	13.76%	3	0.17%	1	0.06%	0	0.00%	0	0.00%	1,250	72.25%	1,730
Hamblen	2,438	51.88%	2,261	48.12%	0	0.00%	0	0.00%	0	0.00%	0	0.00%	177	3.77%	4,699
Hamilton	16,568	70.24%	6,917	29.32%	44	0.19%	43	0.18%	17	0.07%	0	0.00%	9,651	40.91%	23,589
Hancock	960	36.46%	1,673	63.54%	0	0.00%	0	0.00%	0	0.00%	0	0.00%	-713	-27.08%	2,633
Hardeman	1,869	92.25%	157	7.75%	0	0.00%	0	0.00%	0	0.00%	0	0.00%	1,712	84.50%	2,026
Hardin	1,538	53.13%	1,348	46.56%	9	0.31%	0	0.00%	0	0.00%	0	0.00%	190	6.56%	2,895
Hawkins	2,278	40.76%	3,300	59.04%	2	0.04%	9	0.16%	0	0.00%	0	0.00%	-1,022	-18.29%	5,589
Haywood	1,725	98.23%	29	1.65%	1	0.06%	1	0.06%	0	0.00%	0	0.00%	1,696	96.58%	1,756
Henderson	1,307	47.48%	1,380	50.13%	29	1.05%	27	0.98%	7	0.25%	3	0.11%	-73	-2.65%	2,753
Henry	3,223	86.69%	470	12.64%	8	0.22%	13	0.35%	4	0.11%	0	0.00%	2,753	74.05%	3,718
Hickman	1,804	83.33%	353	16.30%	3	0.14%	3	0.14%	2	0.09%	0	0.00%	1,451	67.02%	2,165
Houston	813	80.82%	193	19.18%	0	0.00%	0	0.00%	0	0.00%	0	0.00%	620	61.63%	1,006
Humphreys	1,279	81.00%	297	18.81%	1	0.06%	2	0.13%	0	0.00%	0	0.00%	982	62.19%	1,579
Jackson	1,702	79.98%	422	19.83%	2	0.09%	1	0.05%	1	0.05%	0	0.00%	1,280	60.15%	2,128
Jefferson	1,079	31.29%	2,356	68.33%	2	0.06%	8	0.23%	3	0.09%	0	0.00%	-1,277	-37.04%	3,448
Johnson	533	15.61%	2,882	84.39%	0	0.00%	0	0.00%	0	0.00%	0	0.00%	-2,349	-68.78%	3,415
Knox	19,837	61.76%	12,183	37.93%	62	0.19%	19	0.06%	5	0.02%	14	0.04%	7,654	23.83%	32,120
Lake	3,604	96.88%	113	3.04%	1	0.03%	2	0.05%	0	0.00%	0	0.00%	3,491	93.84%	3,720
Lauderdale	3,540	94.27%	203	5.41%	8	0.21%	2	0.05%	2	0.05%	0	0.00%	3,337	88.87%	3,755
Lawrence	4,773	58.46%	3,342	40.94%	12	0.15%	22	0.27%	6	0.07%	9	0.11%	1,431	17.53%	8,164
Lewis	1,068	76.34%	331	23.66%	0	0.00%	0	0.00%	0	0.00%	0	0.00%	737	52.68%	1,399
Lincoln	3,451	88.76%	430	11.06%	1	0.03%	5	0.13%	1	0.03%	0	0.00%	3,021	77.70%	3,888
Loudon	2,146	47.61%	2,343	51.99%	6	0.13%	11	0.24%	1	0.02%	0	0.00%	-197	-4.37%	4,507
Macon	876	38.25%	1,402	61.22%	2	0.09%	6	0.26%	4	0.17%	0	0.00%	-526	-22.97%	2,290
Madison	6,095	82.93%	1,223	16.64%	19	0.26%	13	0.18%	0	0.00%	0	0.00%	4,872	66.29%	7,350
Marion	2,664	60.08%	1,770	39.92%	0	0.00%	0	0.00%	0	0.00%	0	0.00%	894	20.16%	4,434
Marshall	2,431	88.76%	300	10.95%	1	0.04%	2	0.07%	1	0.04%	4	0.15%	2,131	77.80%	2,739
Maury	3,809	88.07%	497	11.49%	9	0.21%	7	0.16%	3	0.07%	0	0.00%	3,312	76.58%	4,325
McMinn	4,077	48.35%	4,310	51.11%	45	0.53%	0	0.00%	0	0.00%	0	0.00%	-233	-2.76%	8,432
McNairy	1,742	51.19%	1,613	47.40%	4	0.12%	10	0.29%	34	1.00%	0	0.00%	129	3.79%	3,403
Meigs	994	56.90%	740	42.36%	13	0.74%	0	0.00%	0	0.00%	0	0.00%	254	14.54%	1,747
Monroe	4,106	54.03%	3,493	45.97%	0	0.00%	0	0.00%	0	0.00%	0	0.00%	613	8.07%	7,599
Montgomery	3,314	79.28%	838	20.05%	7	0.17%	13	0.31%	4	0.10%	4	0.10%	2,476	59.23%	4,180
Moore	719	87.15%	101	12.24%	5	0.61%	0	0.00%	0	0.00%	0	0.00%	618	74.91%	825
Morgan	1,291	51.13%	1,225	48.51%	4	0.16%	5	0.20%	0	0.00%	0	0.00%	66	2.61%	2,525
Obion	3,728	89.94%	417	10.06%	0	0.00%	0	0.00%	0	0.00%	0	0.00%	3,311	79.88%	4,145
Overton	1,608	62.91%	942	36.85%	4	0.16%	2	0.08%	0	0.00%	0	0.00%	666	26.06%	2,556
Perry	896	80.65%	210	18.90%	2	0.18%	3	0.27%	0	0.00%	0	0.00%	686	61.75%	1,111
Pickett	454	40.54%	651	58.13%	2	0.18%	2	0.18%	11	0.98%	0	0.00%	-197	-17.59%	1,120
Polk	2,283	56.20%	1,755	43.21%	12	0.30%	12	0.30%	0	0.00%	0	0.00%	528	13.00%	4,062
Putnam	2,619	68.35%	1,207	31.50%	2	0.05%	1	0.03%	3	0.08%	0	0.00%	1,412	36.85%	3,832
Rhea	2,199	52.34%	1,964	46.75%	20	0.48%	18	0.43%	0	0.00%	0	0.00%	235	5.59%	4,201
Roane	2,467	47.13%	2,757	52.66%	2	0.04%	1	0.02%	8	0.15%	0	0.00%	-290	-5.54%	5,235
Robertson	2,629	86.03%	388	12.70%	2	0.07%	7	0.23%	1	0.03%	29	0.95%	2,241	73.33%	3,056
Rutherford	4,101	87.07%	580	12.31%	9	0.19%	13	0.28%	2	0.04%	5	0.11%	3,521	74.76%	4,710
Scott	827	29.05%	2,012	70.67%	5	0.18%	3	0.11%	0	0.00%	0	0.00%	-1,185	-41.62%	2,847
Sequatchie	840	70.12%	353	29.47%	1	0.08%	2	0.17%	2	0.17%	0	0.00%	487	40.65%	1,198
Sevier	1,144	21.55%	4,126	77.73%	6	0.11%	9	0.17%	7	0.13%	16	0.30%	-2,982	-56.18%	5,308
Shelby	61,504	96.56%	2,113	3.32%	61	0.10%	12	0.02%	8	0.01%	0	0.00%	59,391	93.24%	63,698
Smith	2,092	76.74%	626	22.96%	2	0.07%	1	0.04%	1	0.04%	4	0.15%	1,466	53.78%	2,726
Stewart	1,718	84.71%	303	14.94%	3	0.15%	4	0.20%	0	0.00%	0	0.00%	1,415	69.77%	2,028
Sullivan	6,269	64.00%	3,492	35.65%	12	0.12%	19	0.19%	3	0.03%	0	0.00%	2,777	28.35%	9,795
Sumner	3,146	85.82%	517	14.10%	2	0.05%	1	0.03%	0	0.00%	0	0.00%	2,629	71.71%	3,666
Tipton	4,683	97.58%	116	2.42%	0	0.00%	0	0.00%	0	0.00%	0	0.00%	4,567	95.17%	4,799
Trousdale	765	91.18%	72	8.58%	2	0.24%	0	0.00%	0	0.00%	0	0.00%	693	82.60%	839
Unicoi	879	31.89%	1,850	67.13%	3	0.11%	1	0.04%	23	0.83%	0	0.00%	-971	-35.23%	2,756
Union	963	34.90%	1,785	64.70%	7	0.25%	1	0.04%	3	0.11%	0	0.00%	-822	-29.79%	2,759
Van Buren	690	73.33%	251	26.67%	0	0.00%	0	0.00%	0	0.00%	0	0.00%	439	46.65%	941
Warren	2,304	80.28%	553	19.27%	5	0.17%	7	0.24%	1	0.03%	0	0.00%	1,751	61.01%	2,870
Washington	4,448	47.86%	4,788	51.52%	15	0.16%	36	0.39%	7	0.08%	0	0.00%	-340	-3.66%	9,294
Wayne	733	35.91%	1,304	63.89%	2	0.10%	2	0.10%	0	0.00%	0	0.00%	-571	-27.98%	2,041
Weakley	3,254	77.26%	928	22.03%	11	0.26%	11	0.26%	5	0.12%	3	0.07%	2,326	55.22%	4,212
White	1,814	75.14%	591	24.48%	2	0.08%	4	0.17%	1	0.04%	2	0.08%	1,223	50.66%	2,414
Williamson	2,769	90.52%	286	9.35%	4	0.13%	0	0.00%	0	0.00%	0	0.00%	2,483	81.17%	3,059
Wilson	3,108	85.27%	534	14.65%	1	0.03%	2	0.05%	0	0.00%	0	0.00%	2,574	70.62%	3,645
Totals	328,083	68.77%	147,055	30.82%	692	0.15%	634	0.13%	326	0.07%	296	0.06%	181,028	37.94%	477,086

==== Counties that flipped from Republican to Democratic ====
- Bradley
- Anderson
- Hardin
- Morgan

==== Counties that flipped from Democratic to Republican ====
- Pickett

== Analysis ==
Roosevelt's 68.78 percent of the vote is the largest obtained by any presidential candidate in Tennessee since 1832, when Andrew Jackson received 95.42 percent of the total. Despite this, the most strongly Unionist counties of East Tennessee were steadfast in their support for Landon: his 84.39 percent in Johnson County was the second-largest proportion Landon received in any county nationwide, whilst Sevier County and Cocke County were his sixth and eighth-best counties respectively. Roosevelt was, however, the first Democrat since James Buchanan in 1856 to carry Hardin County, one of the small Unionist Highland Rim bloc in West Tennessee, and Morgan County. FDR was also the first Democrat since Andrew Jackson to carry Anderson County.

As of the 2024 presidential election, this election constitutes the last occasion when Bradley County and Greene County voted for a Democratic presidential candidate.

== See also ==
- 1936 United States Senate election in Tennessee
- 1936 Tennessee gubernatorial election
