= 1934 United States Senate special election in Tennessee =

- November 6, 1934
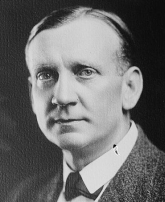

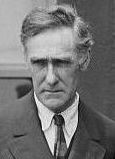
Nominee	Nathan L. Bachman	John Randolph Neal Jr.
Party	Democratic	Independent
Popular vote	200,249	49,773
Percentage	80.09%	19.91%
- County results Bachman: 50–60% 60–70% 70–80% 80–90% >90% Neal: 50–60%
Senator before election
Nathan L. Bachman
Democratic
Elected Senator
Nathan L. Bachman
Democratic

The 1934 United States Senate special election in Tennessee took place on November 6, 1934, concurrently with other elections to the United States Senate as well as elections to the United States House of Representatives and various state and local elections. The special election was held because incumbent Democratic Senator Cordell Hull resigned to accept the appointment of President Franklin D. Roosevelt to the office of Secretary of State.

Democratic Governor Hill McAlister appointed Nathan L. Bachman to finish the Hull's unexpired senate term. Bachman ran for a full term in the special election and won with 80.1% of the vote defeating Independent candidate John Randolph Neal Jr.

== Democratic primary ==
=== Candidates ===
- Gordon Browning, U.S. Representative from Tennessee's 7th congressional district
- Nathan L. Bachman, incumbent senator

Democratic Party primary results
Party	Candidate	Votes	%
Democratic	Nathan L. Bachman (incumbent)	166,293	57.85%
Democratic	Gordon Browning	121,169	42.15%
Total votes		287,462	100.00%

== General election ==
General election results
Party	Candidate	Votes	%
Democratic	Nathan L. Bachman (incumbent)	200,249	80.09%
Independent	John Randolph Neal Jr.	49,773	19.91%
Majority		150,476	60.18%
Turnout		250,022	
Democratic hold			

== See also ==
- 1934 United States Senate elections
- 1934 Tennessee gubernatorial election
