= 1936 United States Senate election in Tennessee =

- November 3, 1936
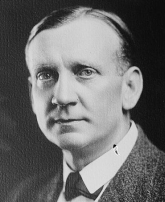

Nominee	Nathan L. Bachman	Dwayne D. Maddox
Party	Democratic	Republican
Popular vote	273,298	69,753
Percentage	75.88%	19.37%
- County results Bachman: 40–50% 50–60% 60–70% 70–80% 80–90% >90% Maddox: 40–50% 50–60% 60–70% 70–80%
Senator before election
Nathan L. Bachman
Democratic
Elected Senator
Nathan L. Bachman
Democratic

The 1936 United States Senate election in Tennessee took place on November 3, 1936, concurrently with the U.S. presidential election, as well as elections to the United States Senate in other states as well as elections to the United States House of Representatives and various state and local elections. Incumbent Democratic Senator Nathan L. Bachman won re-election to a full term, defeating Republican candidate Dwayne D. Maddox.

== Democratic primary ==
=== Candidates ===
- John Randolph Neal Jr., attorney, law professor, politician, and activist
- Nathan L. Bachman, incumbent senator

Democratic Party primary results
Party	Candidate	Votes	%
Democratic	Nathan L. Bachman (incumbent)	217,531	82.91%
Democratic	John Randolph Neal Jr.	44,830	17.09%
Total votes		262,361	100.00%

== General election ==
General election results
Party	Candidate	Votes	%
Democratic	Nathan L. Bachman (Incumbent)	273,298	75.88%
Republican	Dwayne D. Maddox	69,753	19.37%
Independent	John Randolph Neal Jr.	14,617	4.06%
Socialist	Howard Kester	2,516	0.70%
Majority		203,545	56.51%
Turnout		360,184	
Democratic hold			

== See also ==
- 1936 United States presidential election in Tennessee
- 1936 Tennessee gubernatorial election
- 1936 United States Senate elections
