= 1936 Tennessee gubernatorial election =

- November 3, 1936
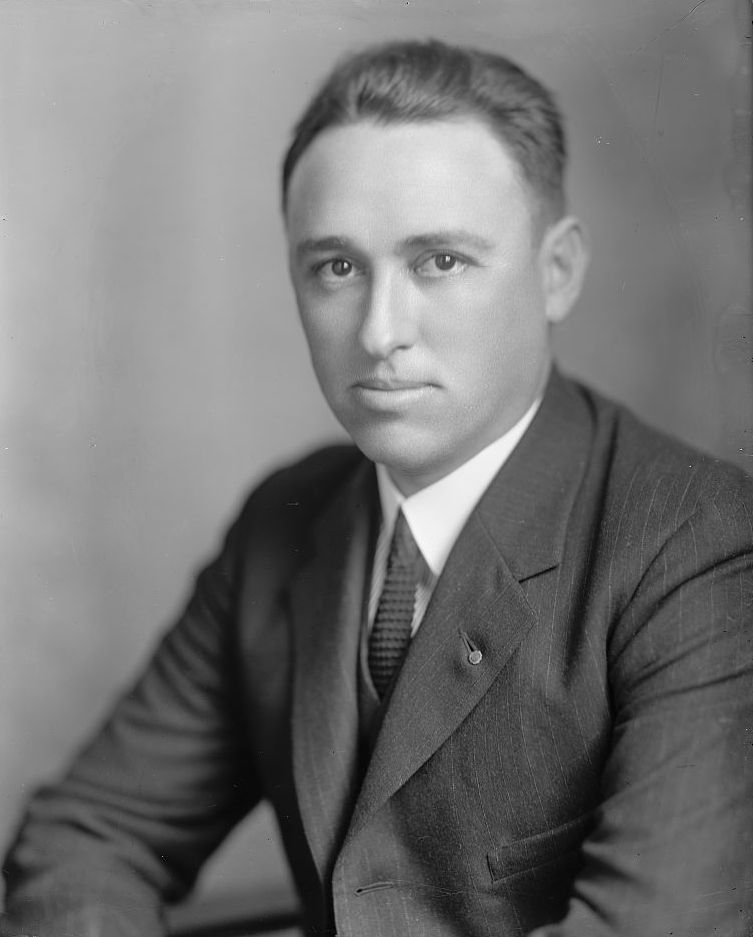

Nominee	Gordon Browning	Pat H. Thach
Party	Democratic	Republican
Popular vote	332,523	77,392
Percentage	80.38%	18.71%
- County results Browning: 40–50% 50–60% 60–70% 70–80% 80–90% >90% Thach: 40–50% 50–60% 60–70%
Governor before election
Hill McAlister
Democratic
Elected Governor
Prentice Cooper
Democratic

The 1936 Tennessee gubernatorial election was held on November 3, 1936. Democratic nominee Gordon Browning defeated Republican nominee Pat H. Thach with 80.4% of the vote.

Incumbent Democratic governor Hill McAlister angered Memphis political boss E. H. Crump by proposing a state sales tax, and did not seek re-election. Gordon Browning sought the party's nomination, his chief opponent being Campbell County school superintendent Burgin Dossett. Crump initially proclaimed neutrality, but when it became clear Browning could win with or without the Shelby County vote, he endorsed Browning. Browning coasted to victory in the primary, and defeated the Republican candidate, Pat H. Thach, 332,523 votes to 77,392 in the general election.

Browning had campaigned on cleaning up state government, getting the debt (which had skyrocketed to over $100 million by the time he took office) under control, and maintaining statewide prohibition (national prohibition had ended with the repeal of the 18th Amendment).

== Primary elections ==
Primary elections were held on August 6, 1936.

=== Democratic primary ===
==== Candidates ====
- Gordon Browning, former U.S. Representative
- Burgin E. Dossett
- C. W. Wright

==== Results ====
Democratic primary results
Party	Candidate	Votes	%
Democratic	Gordon Browning	243,463	68.00%
Democratic	Burgin E. Dossett	109,170	30.49%
Democratic	C. W. Wright	5,384	1.50%
Total votes		358,017	100.00%

== General election ==
=== Candidates ===
Major party candidates

- Gordon Browning, Democratic
- Pat H. Thach, Republican

Other candidates

- Kate Bradford Stockton, Socialist

=== Results ===
1936 Tennessee gubernatorial election
Party	Candidate	Votes	%	±%
Democratic	Gordon Browning	332,523	80.38%	
Republican	Pat H. Thach	77,392	18.71%	
Socialist	Kate Bradford Stockton	3,786	0.92%	
Majority		255,131		
Turnout				
Democratic hold		Swing		

== See also ==
- 1936 United States presidential election in Tennessee
- 1936 United States Senate election in Tennessee
