= 1916 United States Senate election in Tennessee =

- November 7, 1916
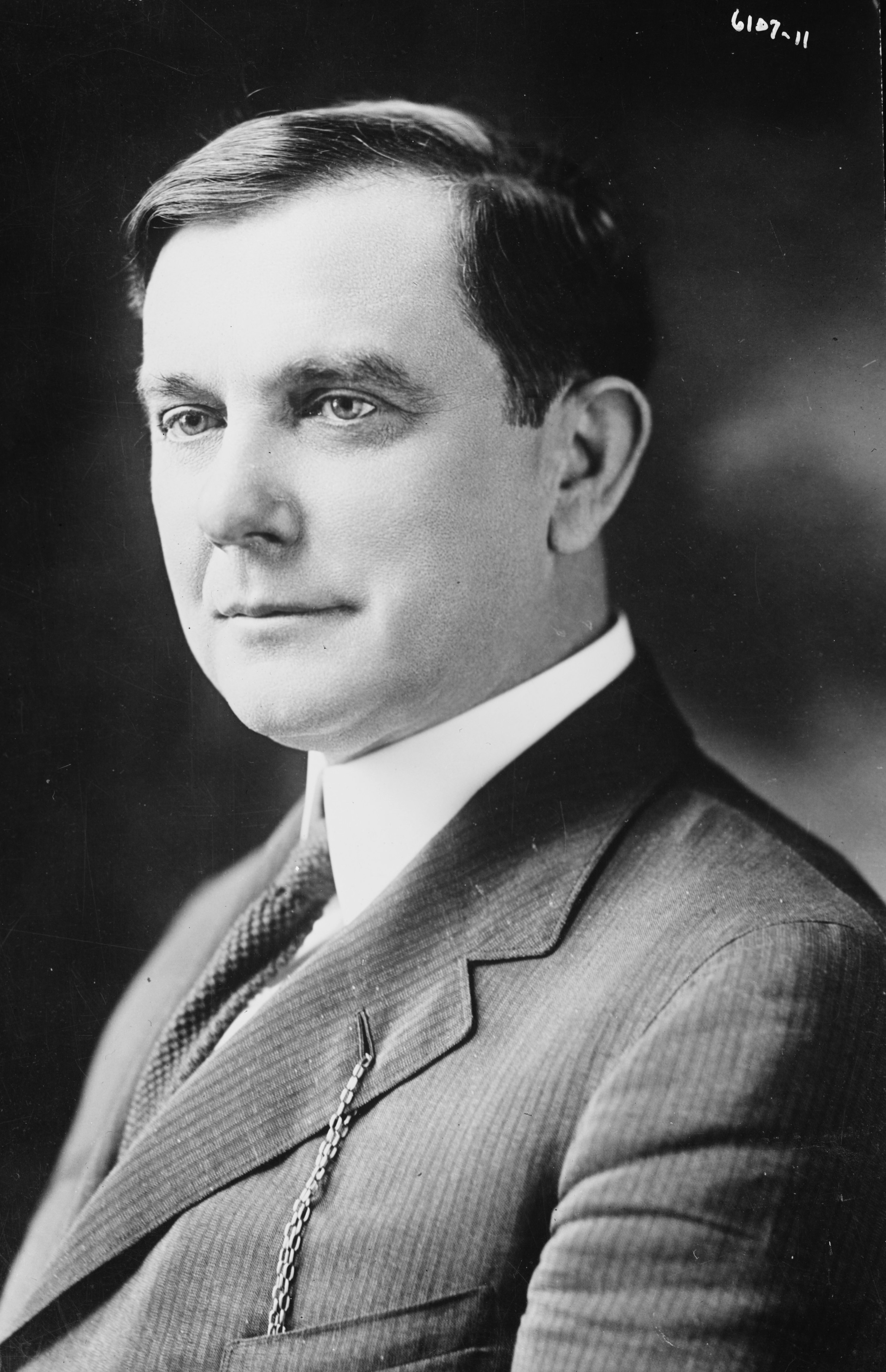

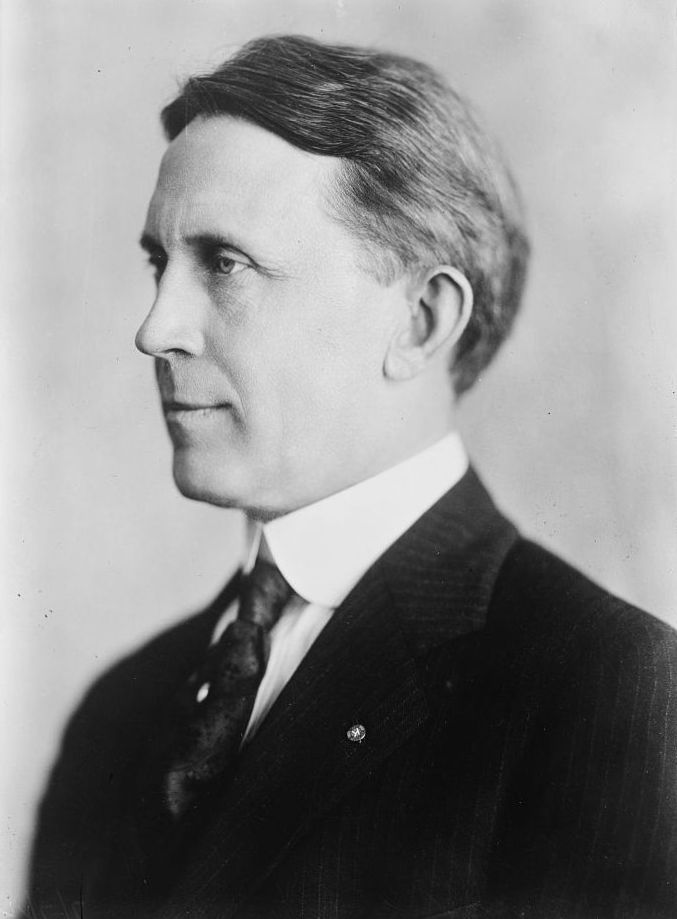
Nominee	Kenneth McKellar	Ben W. Hooper
Party	Democratic	Republican
Popular vote	143,718	118,174
Percentage	54.42%	44.75%
- County results McKellar: 40–50% 50–60% 60–70% 70–80% 80–90% >90% Hooper: 50–60% 60–70% 70–80% 80–90% >90%
U.S. senator before election
Luke Lea
Democratic
Elected U.S. senator
Kenneth McKellar
Democratic

The 1916 United States Senate election in Tennessee was held on November 7, 1916. Incumbent Democratic Senator Luke Lea ran for re-election to a second term, but was defeated for the Democratic nomination by U.S. Representative Kenneth McKellar. McKellar won the general election against Republican Governor of Tennessee Ben W. Hooper.

This was the first popular election for U.S. Senator held in Tennessee, following the ratification of the Seventeenth Amendment to the United States Constitution. McKellar would go on to serve six terms in the Senate, becoming one of the longest serving members of either house of Congress.

== Democratic primary ==
=== Candidates ===
- Luke Lea, incumbent Senator since 1911
- Kenneth McKellar, U.S. Representative from Memphis
- Malcolm R. Patterson, former Governor of Tennessee (1907–1911)

=== Results ===
In the initial primary, held in November 1915, McKellar finished first, carrying both East and West Tennessee. His support in East Tennessee came on the back of Senator John Knight Shields, who controlled federal patronage in the state and assigned federal employees to campaign on McKellar's behalf. Patterson finished second, carrying Central Tennessee. Senator Lea was eliminated.

In a runoff, McKellar increased his margin over Patterson.

== General election ==
=== Candidates ===
- Ben W. Hooper, former Governor of Tennessee (1911–1915) (Republican)
- H. H. Magnum (Socialist)
- Kenneth McKellar, U.S. Representative from Memphis

=== Results ===
1916 U.S. Senate election in Tennessee
Party	Candidate	Votes	%
Democratic	Kenneth McKellar	143,718	54.42%
Republican	Ben W. Hooper	118,174	44.75%
Socialist	H. H. Magnum	2,193	0.83%
Total votes		264,085	100.00%
Democratic hold			

== See also ==
- 1916 United States presidential election in Tennessee
- 1916 Tennessee gubernatorial election
- 1916 United States Senate elections
