= 1918 United States Senate election in Tennessee =

- November 5, 1918
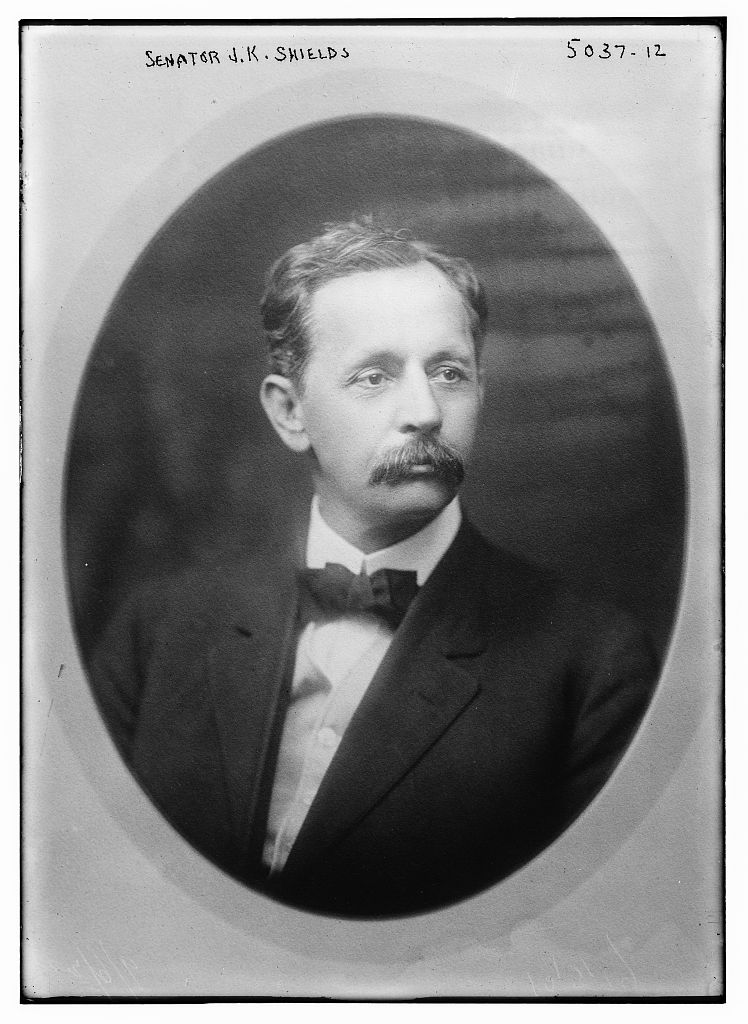

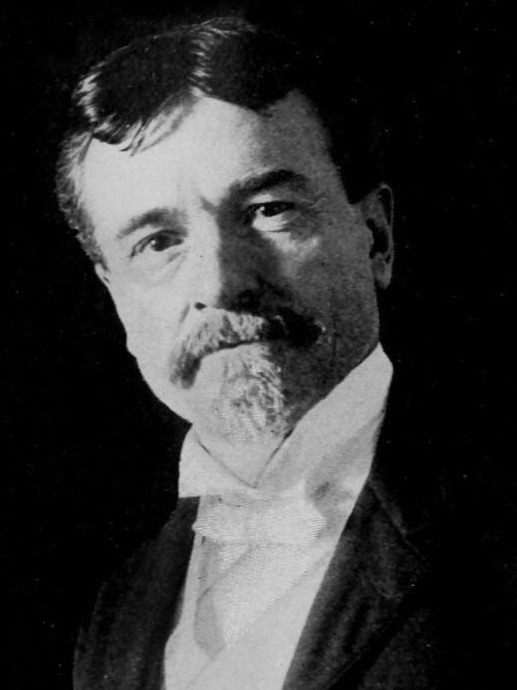
Nominee	John K. Shields	Henry Clay Evans
Party	Democratic	Republican
Popular vote	98,605	59,989
Percentage	62.17%	37.83%
- County results Shields: 50–60% 60–70% 70–80% 80–90% >90% Evans: 50–60% 60–70% 70–80% 80–90% No data
U.S. senator before election
John K. Shields
Democratic
Elected U.S. senator
John K. Shields
Democratic

The 1918 United States Senate election in Tennessee took place on November 5, 1918, concurrently with the United States Senate elections in other states as well as elections to the United States House of Representatives and various state and local elections. Incumbent Democratic Senator John K. Shields won re-election to a second term, defeating Republican candidate Henry Clay Evans. Turnout is believed to have been influenced by the Spanish flu epidemic.

This was the second popular election for U.S. Senator held in Tennessee, following the ratification of the Seventeenth Amendment to the United States Constitution.

== General election ==
General election results
Party	Candidate	Votes	%
Democratic	John K. Shields (incumbent)	98,605	62.17%
Republican	Henry Clay Evans	59,989	37.83%
Total votes		158,594	100.00%

== See also ==
- 1918 United States Senate elections
- 1918 Tennessee gubernatorial election
