= Albert H. Roberts =

American politician (1868–1946)

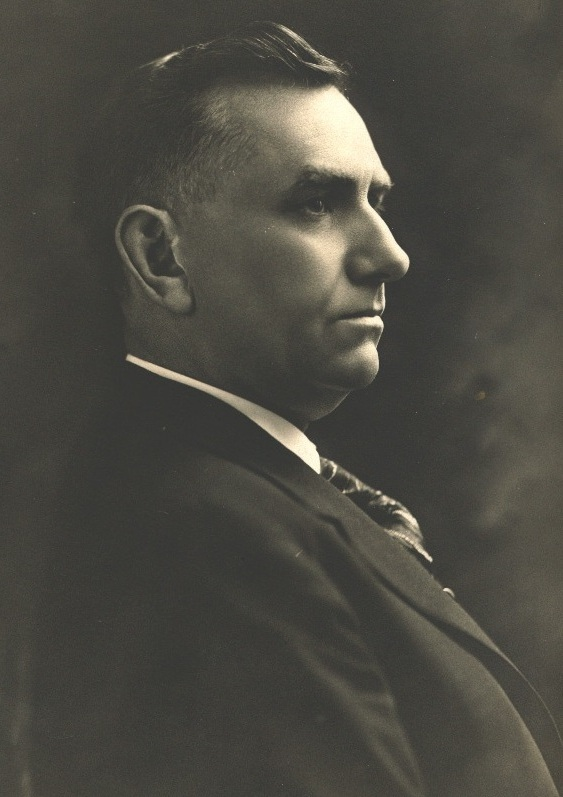

33rd Governor of Tennessee
- In office January 15, 1919 – January 15, 1921
- Preceded by: Thomas Clarke Rye
- Succeeded by: Alfred A. Taylor

Personal details
- Born: July 4, 1868 Overton County, Tennessee
- Died: June 25, 1946 (aged 77) Nashville, Tennessee
- Resting place: Good Hope Cemetery, Livingston, Tennessee
- Party: Democratic
- Spouse: Nora Dean Bowden (m. 1889)
- Education: Hiwassee College
- Profession: Attorney, educator

Albert Houston Roberts (July 4, 1868 – June 25, 1946) was an American politician, educator, and jurist. He served as the 33rd governor of Tennessee from 1919 to 1921, having previously served as a state court judge and as principal of the Alpine Institute. He is best remembered for calling the special session of the Tennessee General Assembly that ratified the 19th Amendment, which gave women the right to vote, in August 1920. Roberts' support for the amendment and his unpopular tax reform initiatives divided the state Democratic Party and doomed his reelection chances.

== Early life ==
Roberts was born in the community of Alpine in Overton County, Tennessee, the son of John and Sarah (Carlock) Roberts. In 1881, his family moved to Columbus, Kansas. He returned to Tennessee in 1886, however, where he attended Hiwassee College in Madisonville, earning his B.A. in 1889. In 1891, he became principal of the Alpine Academy in his native Overton County. He changed the school's name to "Alpine Institute."

Roberts was admitted to the bar in 1894, and practiced law in the nearby county seat, Livingston. In 1910, he was elected Chancellor of the Fourth Judicial District, which covered fifteen Middle Tennessee counties. He served as an advisor to Benton McMillin's unsuccessful 1912 gubernatorial campaign, and unsuccessfully sought the Democratic Party's nomination for governor in 1914, losing to Tom Rye.

== Governor ==
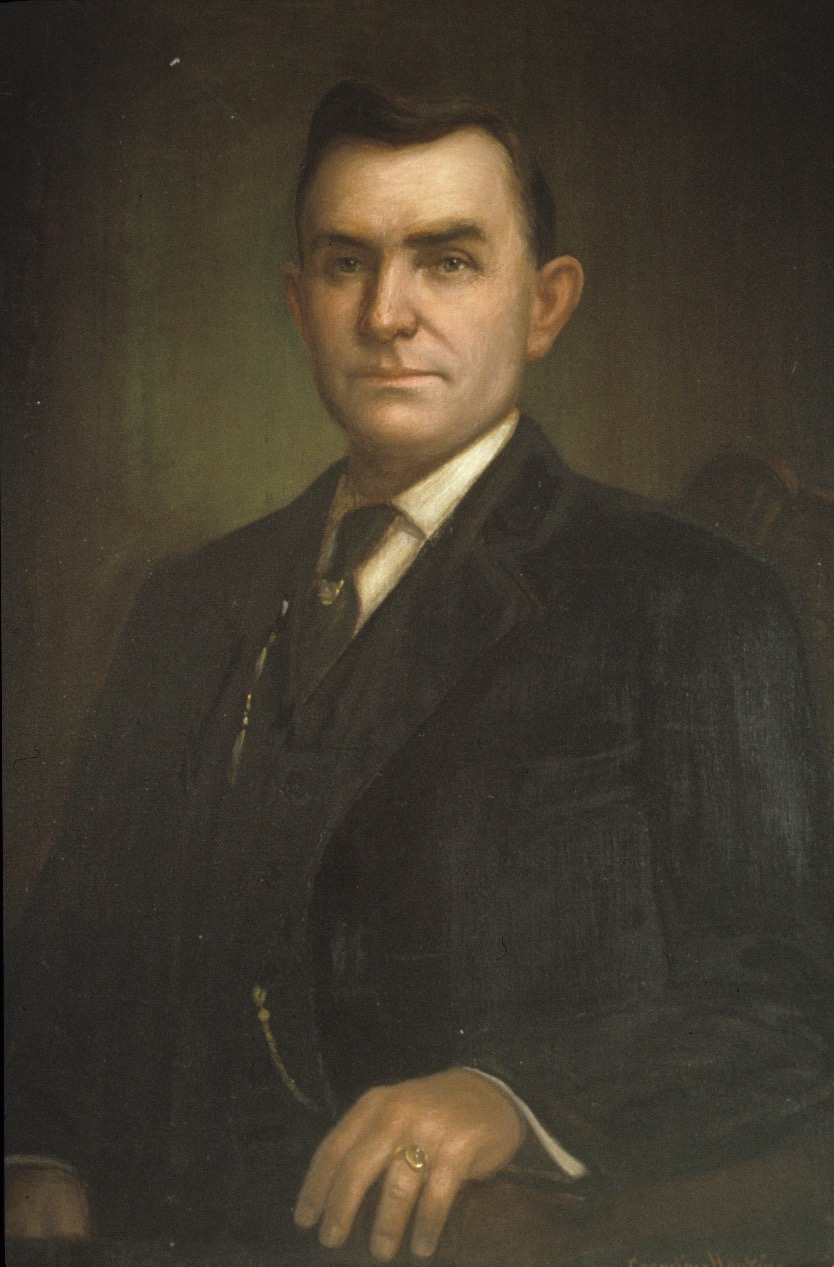
Portrait of Governor Roberts by Cornelius Hawkins, c. 1920

In 1918, Roberts again sought the Democratic nomination for governor in hopes of succeeding Governor Rye, who was not running for reelection. His opponent for the nomination was former state legislator Austin Peay. Roberts gained the support of party bosses E. H. Crump, Hilary Howse, and Nashville Banner publisher E. B. Stahlman, and defeated Peay in the primary by 12,000 votes. In the general election, Roberts defeated Knoxville judge Hugh B. Lindsay, 98,628 (62%) votes to 59,518 (38%) (turnout is believed to have been influenced by that year's flu epidemic).

Among Roberts' first orders of business was to certify the state's ratification of the 18th Amendment, which implemented nationwide prohibition. The state senate had voted 28 to 2 in favor of ratification, and the state house had voted 82 to 2 in favor. Tennessee was the 23rd state to ratify the amendment.

When Roberts took office, Tennessee was struggling with mounting state debt and an outdated tax code that favored rural residents over urban residents. Roberts signed legislation that authorized the State Railroad Commission to collect taxes on utilities and railroads, and empowered it to conduct a reassessment of property values. He also implemented a "sliding scale" on taxable personal property, which reduced individual tax rates as the amount of overall tax collections increased. The new tax code angered farmers and many business leaders.

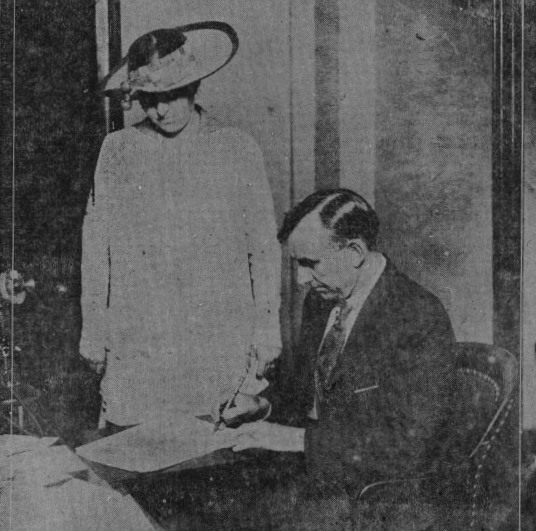
Roberts certifying the state's ratification of the 19th Amendment in August 1920

In 1919, strikes erupted at the Carter Shoe Company in Nashville and the Knoxville Railway and Light Company in Knoxville. Roberts dispatched state guardsmen to quell both strikes, and attempted to organize a state police force. He was assailed for these actions by the Tennessee Federation of Labor.

On June 7, 1919, Roberts performed the marriage ceremony for celebrated World War I Medal of Honor recipient Sergeant Alvin York and Gracie Williams in the Pall Mall community, in Fentress County.

Having alienated multiple constituencies within his own party, Roberts was challenged for the party's nomination for governor in 1920 by former Chattanooga mayor William Riley Crabtree. Along with attacks from labor groups and farmers, Roberts was accused by Putnam County Herald editor E. L. Wirt of hiring a "disreputable" secretary. In spite of these attacks and the general unpopularity of his tax reforms, he defeated Crabtree 67,886 votes to 44,853 in the party's August 5 primary.

On August 9, following his victory in the primaries, Roberts called a special session of the General Assembly to consider ratification of the 19th Amendment, which would give women the right to vote. The amendment required ratification in 36 states to become law, and by August 1920, 35 had ratified it, while eight had rejected it, and five (including Tennessee) had yet to vote. The state senate approved the amendment by a 25 to 4 margin, and it narrowly passed in the state house by a 50 to 46 vote. Angry anti-suffragists tried to file an injunction preventing Roberts from certifying the legislature's vote, but the Tennessee Supreme Court ruled against them. Roberts certified the state's ratification of the amendment on August 24, 1920.

Roberts' support of the 19th Amendment brought him praise nationally, but in Tennessee it merely alienated still more members of his own party. In the general election campaign, the Republican nominee, Alfred A. Taylor, ruthlessly attacked Roberts' tax reforms. Democrats attempted to stoke racial fears by criticizing Taylor for supporting the Lodge Bill (which would have provided protections for black voters) when he was in Congress. On election day, Taylor defeated Roberts by a vote of 229,143 (55%) to 185,890 (45%).

== Later life ==
After his term as governor, Roberts practiced law in Nashville, initially in partnership with James W. Cooper (1921–1925), and afterward with his son, Albert H. Roberts Jr. (1925–1946), and Theodore Trimmier McCarley He died in Nashville on June 25, 1946, and is buried in the Good Hope Cemetery in Livingston.

== Family and legacy ==
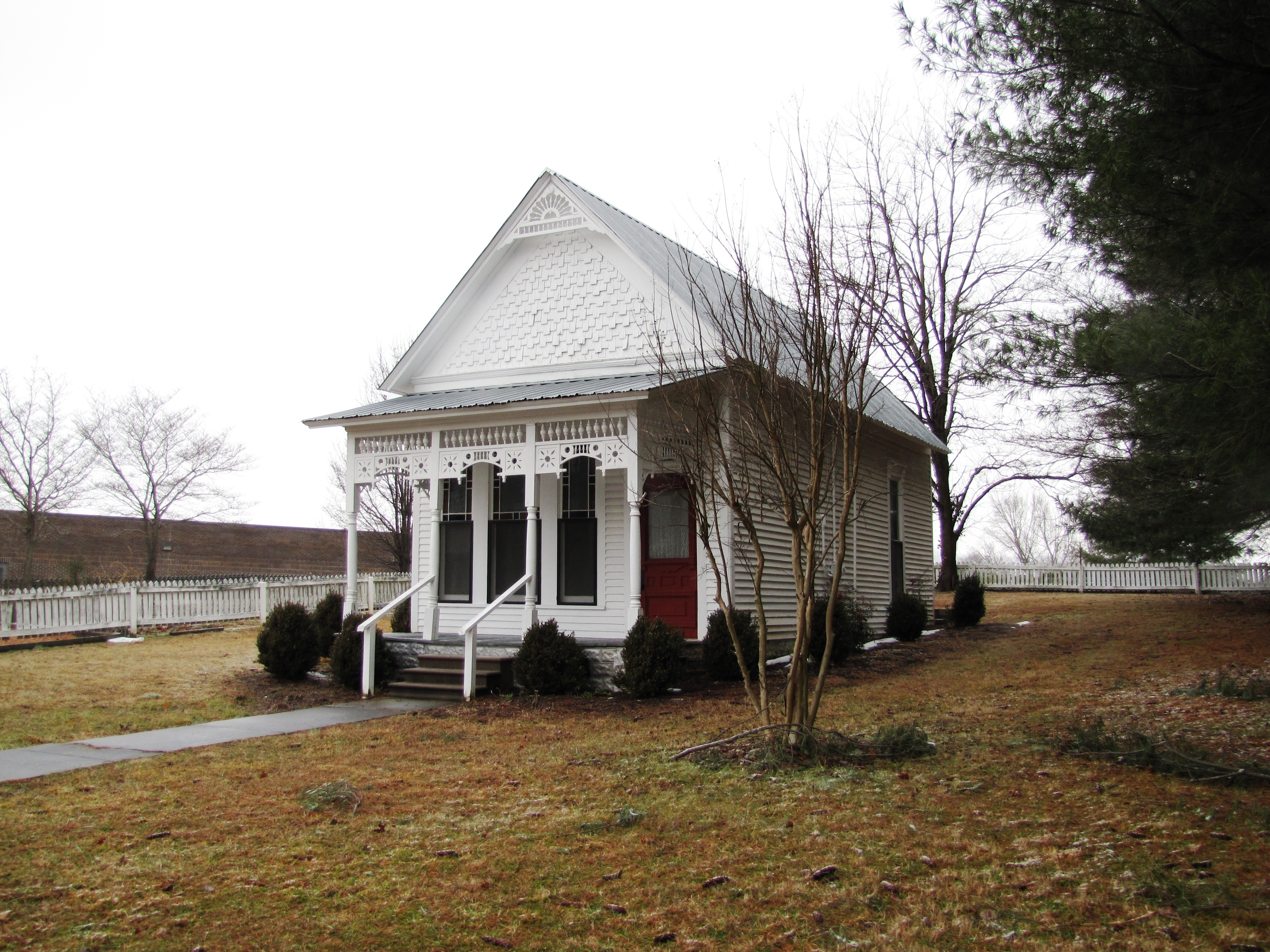
Roberts' law office in Livingston

Roberts married Nora Dean Bowden in 1889. She taught music at the Alpine Institute, and her father, Bailey, taught Latin.

In 1909, Roberts convinced the Disciples of Christ Board of Missions to establish a mission school, Livingston Academy, in Livingston. This school still serves the Livingston area. The Alpine Institute's high school remained in operation until 1947, when its students were transferred to Livingston Academy. In 1987, the Institute's grade school was merged with several other grade schools to form A. H. Roberts Elementary School, which was named for Roberts. Several of the Alpine Institute's buildings have been listed on the National Register of Historic Places.

The Albert H. Roberts Law Office, a small building constructed circa 1885 and rented by Roberts from 1900 to 1913, still stands on Main Street in Livingston. The building has been listed on the National Register and documented by the Historic American Buildings Survey.

== See also ==
- List of governors of Tennessee

Party political offices
Preceded by Thomas Clarke Rye	Democratic nominee for Governor of Tennessee; 1918, 1920	Succeeded by Austin Peay
Political offices
Preceded by Tom C. Rye	Governor of Tennessee; 1919-1921	Succeeded by Alfred A. Taylor
