= 1914 Tennessee gubernatorial election =

- November 3, 1914
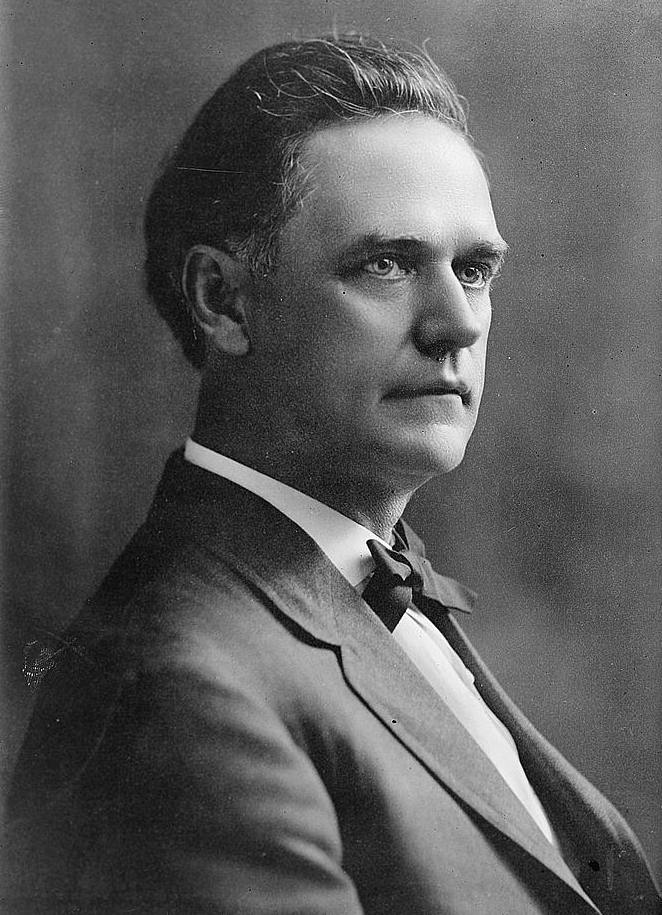

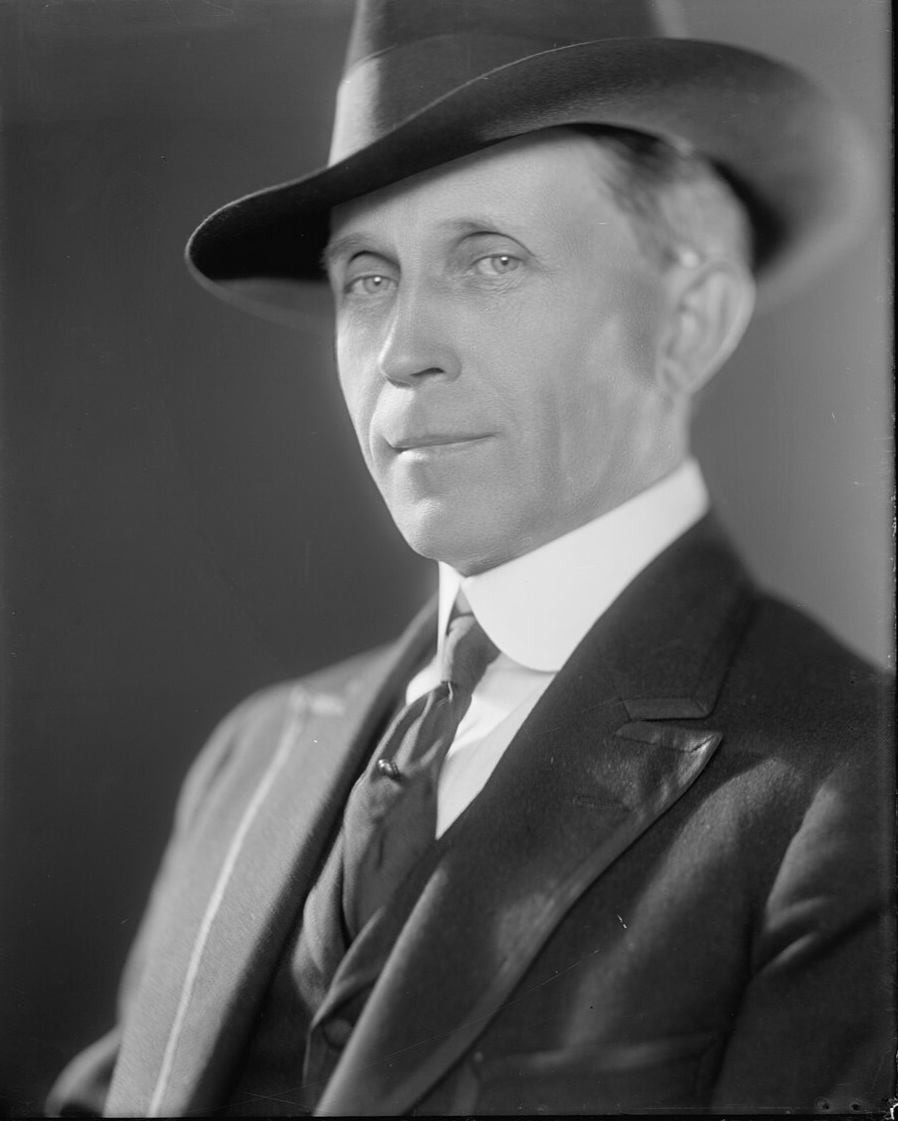
| Nominee | Thomas Clarke Rye | Ben W. Hooper |
| Party | Democratic | Republican |
| Popular vote | 137,636 | 117,717 |
| Percentage | 53.55% | 45.80% |
- County results Rye: 50–60% 60–70% 70–80% 80–90% >90% Hooper: 50–60% 60–70% 70–80% 80–90%
Governor before election
Ben W. Hooper
Republican
Elected Governor
Thomas Clarke Rye
Democratic

The 1914 Tennessee gubernatorial election was held on November 3, 1914. Democratic nominee Thomas Clarke Rye defeated incumbent Republican governor Ben W. Hooper with 53.55% of the vote.

== Background ==
Regular Democrats accepted statewide prohibition as part of the party's platform, ending the party's internal divisions. Lacking the support of the Independent Democrats, Hooper was defeated by Democratic candidate Thomas C. Rye.

== General election ==
=== Candidates ===
- Thomas Clarke Rye, Democratic
- Ben W. Hooper, Republican
- J. N. Lotspeich, Socialist

=== Results ===
1914 Tennessee gubernatorial election
| Party | Candidate | Votes | % | ±% |
|---|---|---|---|---|
| Democratic | Thomas Clarke Rye | 137,636 | 53.55% | |
| Republican | Ben W. Hooper (incumbent) | 117,717 | 45.80% | |
| Socialist | J. N. Lotspeich | 1,671 | 0.65% | |
| Majority | | 19,919 | | |
| Turnout | | | | |
| Democratic gain from Republican | | Swing | | |
