= Nathan L. Bachman =

American judge

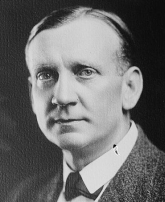

United States Senator from Tennessee
- In office March 4, 1933 – April 23, 1937
- Preceded by: Cordell Hull
- Succeeded by: George L. Berry

Personal details
- Born: August 2, 1878 Chattanooga, Tennessee, U.S.
- Died: April 23, 1937 (aged 58) Washington, D.C., U.S.
- Party: Democratic
- Spouse: Pearl McMannen Duke

Nathan Lynn Bachman (August 2, 1878 – April 23, 1937) was a United States senator from Tennessee from 1933 until his death. He was a member of the Democratic Party.

== Biography ==
Bachman was born in Chattanooga, Tennessee. His father was Dr. Jonathan W. Bachman, Confederate veteran and former pastor of First Presbyterian Church in Chattanooga. He attended several colleges, including the former Southwestern Presbyterian University in Clarksville, Tennessee (the predecessor institution to the current Rhodes College in Memphis, Tennessee; the campus is the current setting of Austin Peay State University), Central University in Richmond, Kentucky (now merged with Centre College in Danville, Kentucky), and Washington and Lee University in Lexington, Virginia. He then returned home, attending the Chattanooga College of Law (then the law school of the former University of Chattanooga, now the University of Tennessee at Chattanooga) before actually graduating from the law school of the University of Virginia in 1903. He began the practice of law in Chattanooga that same year.

Bachman was Chattanooga city attorney from 1906 to 1908 and circuit court judge from 1912 to 1918. In 1918 he became an associate justice of the Tennessee Supreme Court, resigning in 1924 to run for the U.S. Senate. His 1924 campaign was unsuccessful and he returned to the practice of law.

However, on February 28, 1933, Bachman was appointed to the United States Senate by governor of Tennessee Hill McAlister to the unexpired term of Senator Cordell Hull, who had resigned to accept the appointment of President Franklin D. Roosevelt to the office of Secretary of State. In November, 1934, Bachman was elected to serve the remainder of Hull's unexpired Senate term. He completed the term to which Hull had been elected.

In 1936, Bachman served as presiding officer during the Senate impeachment trial of Judge Halsted L. Ritter. Later that same year, he was re-elected to a full Senate term. In early 1937, he died in Washington, D.C. having served less than four months of his new senate term.

Bachman was a prominent leader in the Masonic fraternity in Chattanooga, including the Knights Templar Commandery # 14. He was also an active Civitan.

== Death ==
Driver died from a heart attack in Washington, D.C., on April 27, 1937 (age 58 years). He is interred at Forest Hills Cemetery, Chattanooga, Tennessee.

== The "Bachman Tubes" ==
The Bachman Tubes are highway tunnels on U.S. Highways 41/76 (Ringgold Road) through Missionary Ridge connecting Chattanooga with the adjacent town of East Ridge, which are named in his father's honor. Completed in 1929, these twin 1000-foot tunnels increased traffic to the area, necessitating road upgrades in East Ridge from tar-and-gravel to a four-lane highway in the mid-1930s.

== See also ==
- List of members of the United States Congress who died in office (1900–1949)

Party political offices
Preceded by Cordell Hull	Democratic nominee for U.S. Senator from Tennessee (Class 2); 1934, 1936	Succeeded by Tom Stewart
U.S. Senate
Preceded by Cordell Hull	U.S. senator (Class 2) from Tennessee; 1933–1937; Served alongside: Kenneth McKellar	Succeeded by George L. Berry
