= John K. Shields =

American judge (1858–1934

John Knight Shields
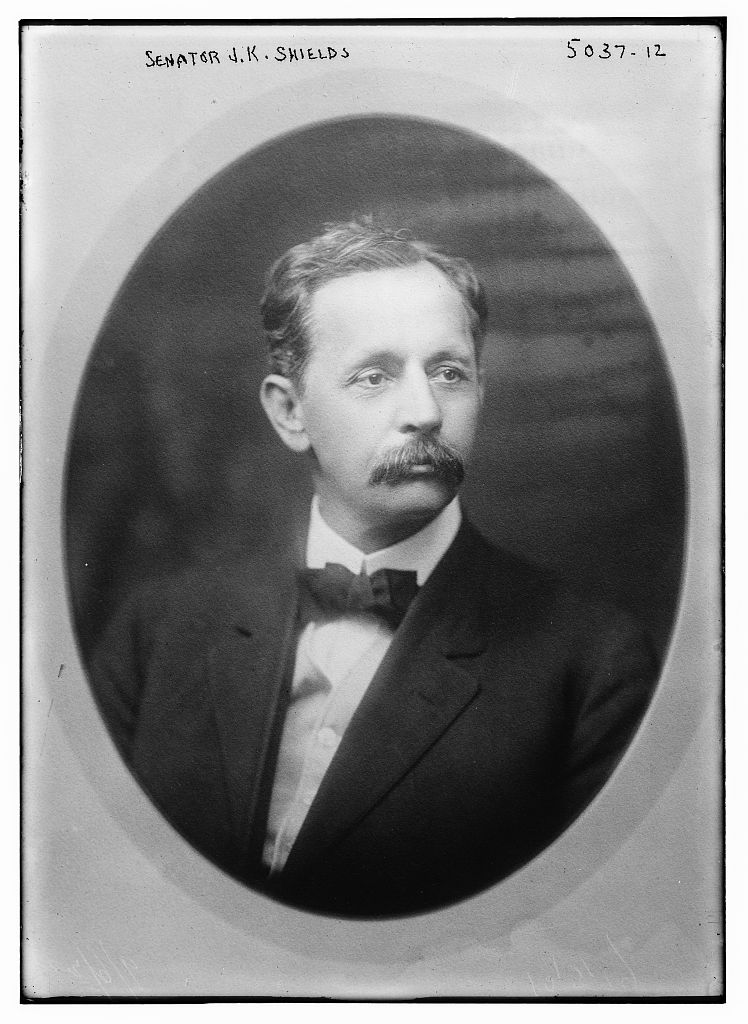

United States Senator from Tennessee
- In office March 4, 1913 – March 3, 1925
- Preceded by: William R. Webb
- Succeeded by: Lawrence Tyson

Personal details
- Born: August 15, 1858 Bean Station, Tennessee
- Died: September 30, 1934 (aged 76) Bean Station, Tennessee
- Resting place: Highland Memorial Cemetery; Knoxville, Tennessee
- Party: Democratic

John Knight Shields (August 15, 1858 – September 30, 1934) was a Democratic United States senator from Tennessee from 1913 to 1925. He also served as an associate justice on the Tennessee Supreme Court from 1902 to 1910, and then chief justice of the Court until 1913.

== Biography ==
Shields was born at his family's estate "Clinchdale", near the early pioneer settlement of Bean's Station, Tennessee in Grainger County. His education as a youth was by private tutors, a sign of the family's affluence. He studied law and was admitted to the Tennessee bar in 1879. He practiced in the counties surrounding his home until 1893, when he was named Chancellor of the former 12th Chancery Division. The next year, he resumed private practice in nearby Morristown, in Hamblen County.

In 1902, Shields was nominated in the Democratic primary to succeed retiring incumbent David L. Snodgrass to become an associate justice of the Tennessee Supreme Court, an office which he held until 1910 when he was named chief justice. He resigned that post in 1913, becoming the last Tennessean elected to the U.S. Senate by the Tennessee General Assembly prior to the 17th Amendment coming into effect. Shields was popularly reelected in 1918 but in 1924 lost the Democratic nomination to Lawrence Tyson, and returned to the private practice of law, this time in Knoxville.

While in the Senate, Shields served as the chairman of several committees. He chaired the Committee on Canadian Relations in the 63rd and 64th Congresses, the Committee on Interoceanic Canals in the 65th Congress, and the Committee on the Sale of Meat Products in the 66th Congress.

Shields died at his estate "Clinchdale" and is buried in Knoxville's Highland Memorial Cemetery.

Party political offices
First	Democratic nominee for U.S. Senator from Tennessee (Class 2); 1918	Succeeded by Lawrence Tyson
U.S. Senate
Preceded by William R. Webb	U.S. senator (Class 2) from Tennessee; 1913–1925; Served alongside: Luke Lea, Kenneth McKellar	Succeeded by Lawrence Tyson
