= Ben W. Hooper =

American politician

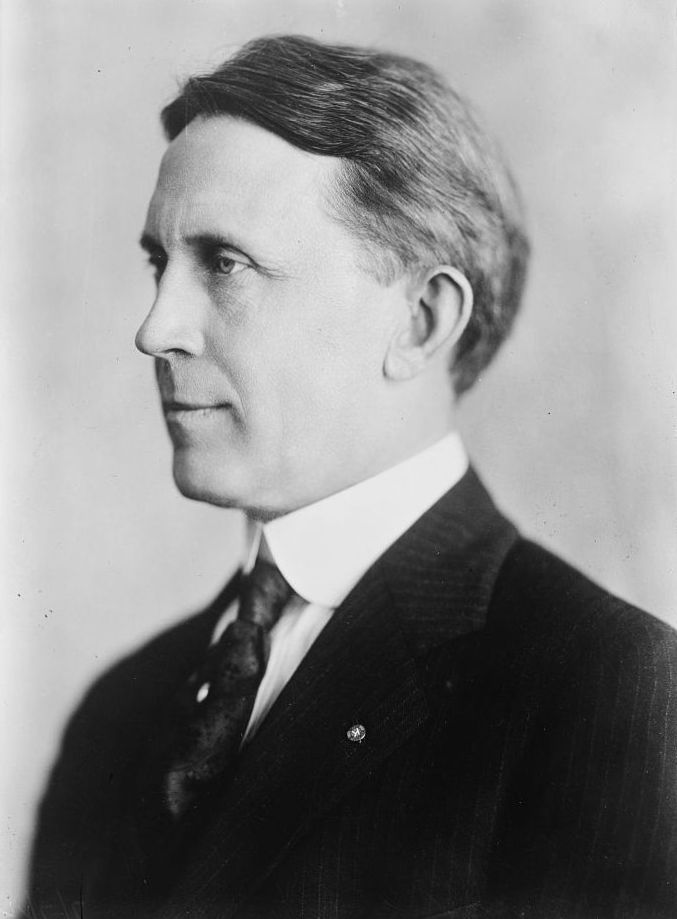

31st Governor of Tennessee
- In office January 26, 1911 – January 17, 1915
- Preceded by: Malcolm R. Patterson
- Succeeded by: Thomas Clarke Rye

Member of the Tennessee House of Representatives
- In office 1893–1897

Personal details
- Born: Bennie Walter Wade; October 13, 1870 Newport, Tennessee, US
- Died: April 18, 1957 (aged 86) Carson Springs, Tennessee
- Resting place: Union Cemetery, Newport, Tennessee
- Party: Republican
- Spouse: Anna Belle Jones Hooper (m. 1901)
- Profession: Attorney

Military service
- Branch/service: U.S. Army
- Years of service: 1898–1899
- Rank: Captain
- Unit: 6th Regiment Volunteer Infantry
- Battles/wars: Spanish–American War

Ben Walter Hooper (October 13, 1870 – April 18, 1957), was an American politician who served two terms as the 31st governor of Tennessee from 1911 to 1915. Elected as a Fusionist candidate, he was one of just three Republicans to hold the office from the end of Reconstruction to the last quarter of the 20th century. His success was due to divisions in the state Democratic Party over prohibition; he received support from some of the party. During his two terms, Hooper signed several prohibition laws, enacted a measure requiring mandatory school attendance, and signed a law requiring direct pay for women workers.

Hooper served as a member of the U.S. Railroad Labor Board (RLB) during the administration of President Warren G. Harding in the early 1920s. As chairman of the RLB, he was a central figure in the 1922 Railroad Shopmen's Strike. He later worked as chief land purchasing agent for the Great Smoky Mountains National Park.

== Early life ==
Hooper was born out of wedlock to Sarah Wade in Newport, Tennessee. His father, Lemuel Washington Hooper, was a physician who was engaged to another woman at the time. Ben and his mother moved to Mossy Creek (modern Jefferson City) and afterwards to Knoxville, where he was placed in the St. John's Orphanage. He was eventually legally adopted by his father, and returned to Newport.

Due to the social stigma surrounding his birth, Hooper struggled as a child in Newport. He later wrote that this made him more determined to succeed. He graduated in 1890 from Carson-Newman College in Jefferson City. He studied law and was admitted to the bar in 1894. Hooper served two terms in the Tennessee House of Representatives, from 1893 to 1897.

During the Spanish–American War, Hooper served as captain of Company C in the 6th U.S. Volunteer Infantry, which was commanded by fellow East Tennessean, Colonel Lawrence Tyson. The unit was stationed in the Arecibo area of northern Puerto Rico for most of the war, and saw little action.

From 1906 to 1910, Hooper was assistant U.S. attorney for the United States District Court for the Eastern District of Tennessee.

== Governor ==
By 1910, a serious rift had developed in Tennessee's Democratic Party over the issue of prohibition. One faction, led by Edward W. Carmack, wanted to extend the state's Four Mile Law (which banned the sale of liquor within four miles of any school) throughout the state, while the other faction, led by Governor Malcolm R. Patterson, wanted major cities to remain exempt. This rift was exacerbated when a Patterson associate killed Carmack in 1908, and Patterson pardoned the killer in 1910. When Patterson tried to control the party's primary process during the 1910 elections, numerous Democrats abandoned the party to run as independents, and thus became known as the "Independent Democrats."

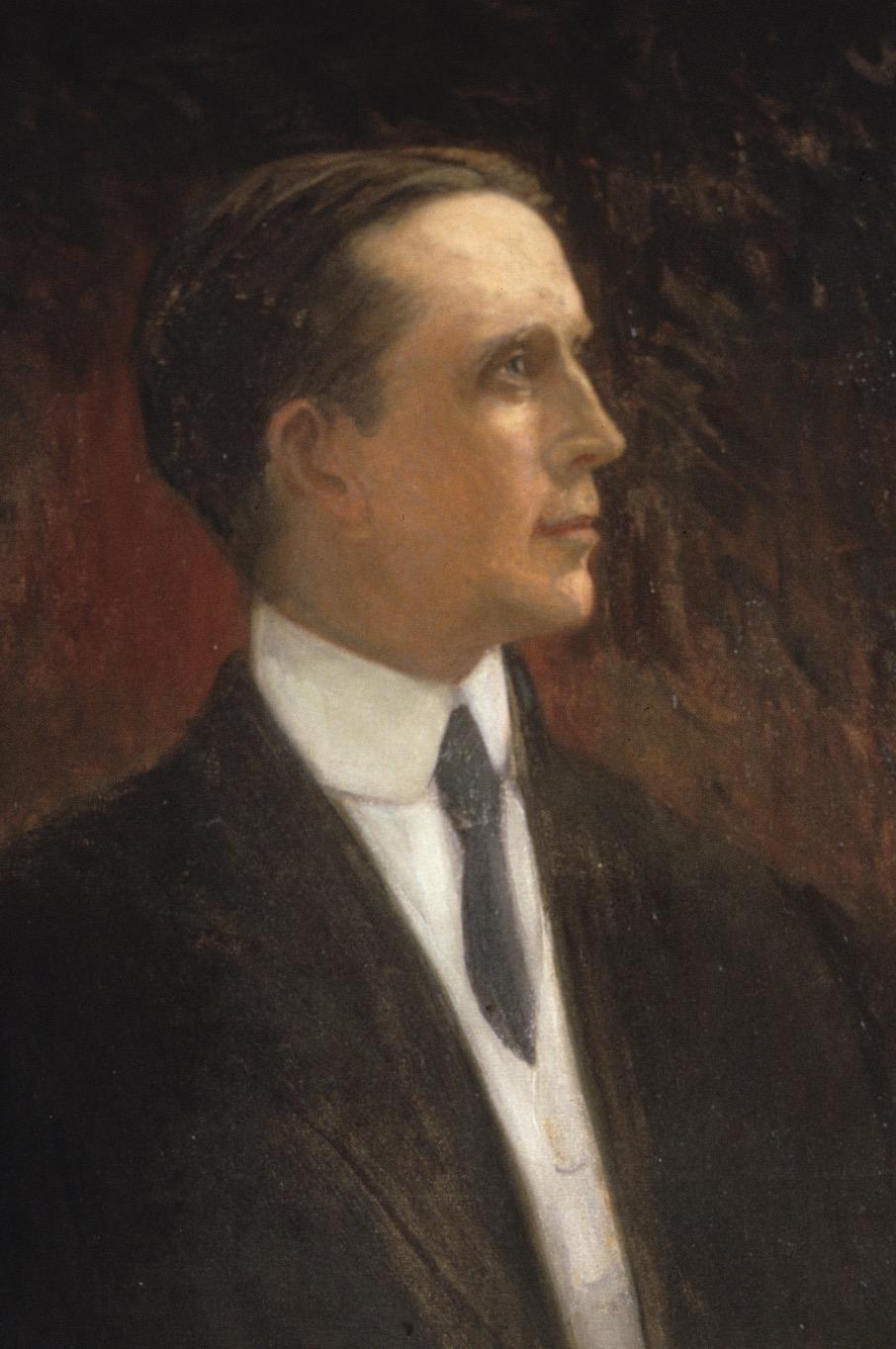
Portrait of Governor Hooper by Willie Betty Newman.

Tennessee's Republican Party was also suffering from internal divisions in 1910, as party bosses Walter P. Brownlow and Newell Sanders were embroiled in a power struggle. The Brownlow faction supported Alfred A. Taylor, brother of former Democratic governor Robert Love Taylor, as the party's nominee, while the Sanders faction supported Hooper. The Sanders faction and the Independent Democrats formed an alliance— later known as the "Fusionists"—and agreed to support each other's candidates. With this support, Hooper was able to win the Republican nomination, while Patterson's allies were defeated in judicial elections that August.

Realizing he had little chance of winning, Patterson withdrew from the race a few weeks before the general election. Democrats quickly nominated Robert Love Taylor in hopes of salvaging party unity. The move proved unsuccessful, however, and Hooper defeated Taylor 133,074 votes to 121,694 to become governor.

The 1911 legislative session was tumultuous, as Fusionists controlled the state house, while the remaining Democrats, known as "Regular Democrats," controlled the state senate. Though both chambers struggled with discord and quorum-busting, Hooper obtained passage of laws limiting child labor and requiring that the wages of women be paid directly to them, rather than to any other persons (employers previously had the option of giving women's pay to their husbands). Hooper also enacted a state pure food and drug law, and authorized counties to issue bonds to establish hospitals and to purchase school property.

In the 1912 governor's race, state Republicans were divided between supporters of William Howard Taft and Theodore Roosevelt, with the latter's supporters, led by John Chiles Houk, breaking from the party and nominating William Poston for governor on a Progressive ticket. State Democrats also remained divided, with Regular Democrats nominating former governor Benton McMillin, and Independent Democrats supporting Hooper and the Fusion ticket. On election day, Hooper won with 124,641 votes to 116,610 for McMillin, and 4,483 for Poston.

During Hooper's second term, he signed measures that required mandatory school attendance for children between the ages of eight and fourteen, and ordered county school boards to provide for the transportation of pupils. Hooper also established inspections for state banks, implemented a parole system for state convicts, and changed the state's method of execution from hanging to electrocution. Pensions were authorized for veterans and widows of the American Civil War. He also signed the so-called "Jug Bill," which banned the intrastate shipment of liquor, and the "Nuisance Bill," which allowed as few as ten citizens to petition for the removal of saloons and gambling houses from a locality.

In the 1914 election season, Regular Democrats accepted statewide prohibition as part of the party's platform, ending the party's internal divisions. Lacking the support of the Independent Democrats, Hooper was defeated by Democratic candidate Thomas C. Rye, 137,656 votes to 116,667.

== Later life ==
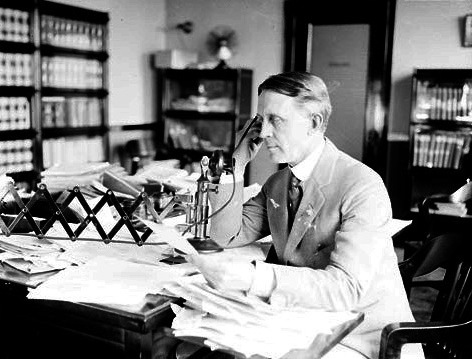
Hooper at his Railroad Labor Board office in 1922

After his gubernatorial tenure ended, Hooper returned to his law practice in Newport, but remained active in Republican politics. He ran for the U.S. Senate in 1916, but was defeated by Democratic politician Kenneth D. McKellar.

In 1921, President Warren G. Harding appointed Hooper to the U.S. Railroad Labor Board (RLB). As chairman of the RLB, Hooper was a central figure in the Railroad Shopmen's Strike which erupted in the summer of 1922 over wage cuts for maintenance workers approved by the RLB.

In the late 1920s and early 1930s, Hooper was the chief land purchasing agent for what would become the Great Smoky Mountains National Park, which was being developed on the Tennessee and North Carolina border.

In 1934, at the age of sixty-four, Hooper once again ran for one of Tennessee's U.S. Senate seats. He won the Republican nomination, but was defeated in the general election by his 1916 opponent, Senator Kenneth McKellar.

Hooper died on April 18, 1957. He is interred at Union Cemetery in Newport, Tennessee.

== Family and legacy ==
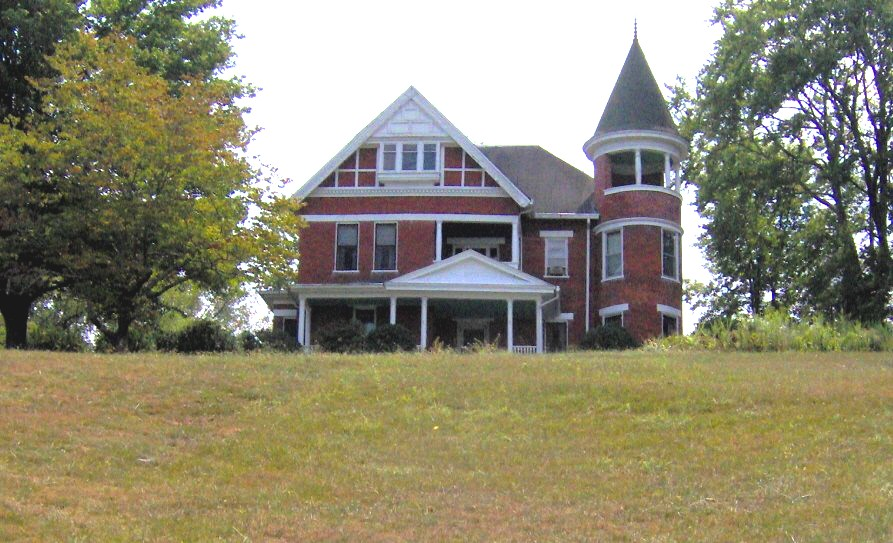
Elm Hill, Hooper's home in Newport, Tennessee

Hooper married Anna Belle Jones in 1901. They had six children: Anna, Ben, James, Margaret, Lemuel and Newell. Hooper's grandson, Ben W. Hooper, II, is a former circuit court judge in the Fourth Judicial District of Tennessee, comprising Cocke, Sevier, Jefferson, and Grainger Counties.

Hooper's autobiography, The Unwanted Boy, was published posthumously in 1963. In 1946, his book, Elections in Tennessee, was published.

Hooper's home, Elm Hill (built in 1885 by Hooper's wife's parents), still stands in Newport, and has been listed on the National Register of Historic Places. The Ben W. Hooper Vocational School, which opened in Newport in 1976, is named in his honor. The school is now part of Cocke County High School.

In the early 2000s, Hooper was the subject of a story entitled "Who's Your Daddy?", which circulated via email. The story, though considerably embellished, was based on incidents Hooper recalled in his autobiography.

== Works ==
- "Labor, Railroads and the Public," American Bar Association Journal, vol. 9, no. 1 (Jan. 1923), pp. 15–18. In JSTOR.

== See also ==
- List of governors of Tennessee

== Footnotes ==
Party political offices
Preceded by G. N. Tillman	Republican nominee for Governor of Tennessee; 1910, 1912, 1914	Succeeded by John W. Overall
First	Republican nominee for U.S. Senator from Tennessee (Class 1); 1916	Succeeded by Newell Sanders
Preceded by James Alexander Fowler	Republican nominee for U.S. Senator from Tennessee (Class 1); 1934	Succeeded by Howard Baker Sr.
Political offices
Preceded by Malcolm R. Patterson	Governor of Tennessee; 1911–1915	Succeeded by Thomas Clarke Rye
