= Walter White (Tennessee politician) =

American politician (1881–1951)

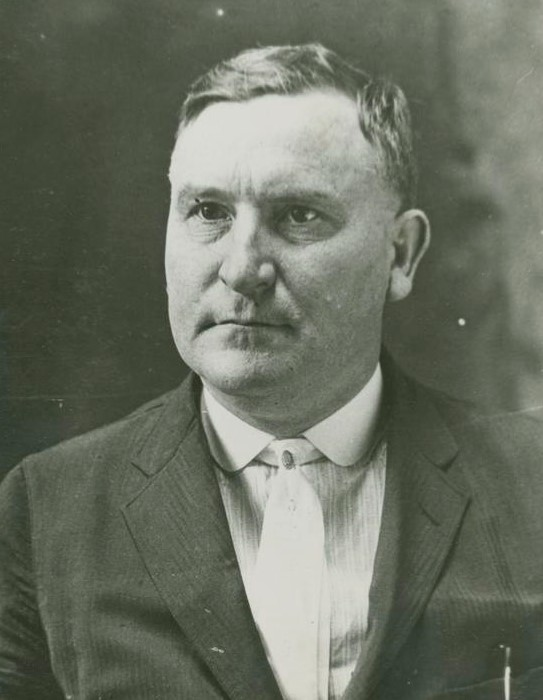
- White in 1925

Member of the Tennessee House of Representatives
- Constituency: 10th floterial district
- In office 1909–1911
- Preceded by: John Neal
- In office 1933–1935
- Preceded by: Grover Harris
- Succeeded by: Sue K. Hicks
- In office 1937–1939
- Preceded by: Sue K. Hicks
- Succeeded by: Herschel Denton
- In office 1941–1949
- Preceded by: Herschel Denton
- Succeeded by: Mary Shadow

Minority Leader of the Tennessee House of Representatives
- In office 1937–1939

Member of the Tennessee Senate from the 9th district
- In office 1911–1913
- Preceded by: John Neal
- Succeeded by: Lewis Shepherd Pope

Personal details
- Born: December 24, 1881 Meigs County, Tennessee, U.S.
- Died: February 14, 1951 (aged 69) Dayton, Tennessee, U.S.
- Party: Republican
- Spouse: Ina B. Whittemore
- Relatives: Milburn White (brother)

Walter White (December 24, 1881 – February 14, 1951) was an American educator and politician from the state of Tennessee. White served in the Tennessee House of Representatives from the 10th floterial district non-consecutively from 1909 to 1949, and in the Tennessee Senate from 1911 to 1913, as a member of the Republican Party. He also served as the superintendent of county schools in Rhea County, Tennessee, from the 1920s to 1940s, and was a figure in the 1925 Scopes trial, helping to organize and publicize the event.

White was born in Meigs County, Tennessee, and educated at multiple universities. He was elected to the state house in 1908, and to the state senate in 1910, where he was the youngest member for that session, before he lost reelection in 1912. He unsuccessfully ran for governor twice, for the Republican nomination in 1924 and with the nomination in 1926. White returned to the state house in 1932, but was defeated in 1934. He returned in 1936, where he served as Minority Leader, but was defeated in 1938. He served in the state house again from 1941 to 1949, until his defeat by Democratic nominee Mary Shadow after losing the Republican nomination.

White served as superintendent until his removal in 1931 due to school funds misappropriation accusations, but was reappointed in 1939, where he served until his removal in 1950. He was active in local politics in Rhea County, where he operated a political machine, and was sent as a delegate to two Republican National Conventions.

== Early life ==
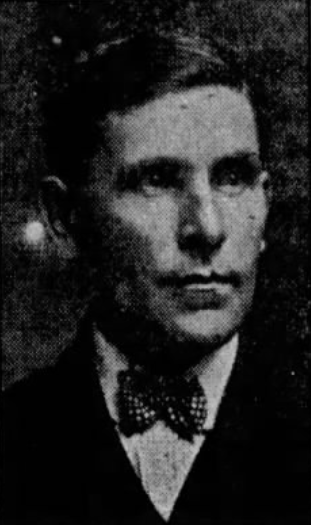
Walter White's brother, Milburn White, also served in the Tennessee General Assembly

Walter White was born in Meigs County, Tennessee, on December 24, 1881, to John White and Susan Couch. White was educated in schools in Meigs and Rhea counties. He attended University of Tennessee at Chattanooga, American Temperance University, Valparaiso University, Cumberland University, and Southern University Law School. He married Ina B. Whittemore, a widow with two children, on January 10, 1915. His brother, Milburn White, was elected to the Tennessee House of Representatives in 1914.

White became principal of Carp High School in the early 1900s. He purchased the Rhea County News in 1913 while working as a teacher in Graysville, Tennessee. He was an educator in multiple counties for seventeen years. He was admitted to the bar in 1944, and practiced until his death.

== Career ==
=== Politics ===
White and John Denton chaired the 1912 Rhea County Republican convention and was a delegate to the Tennessee Republican Party's state convention. He chaired the county convention in 1916. He was a member of the Republican congressional committee in the 4th district until his resignation in 1921.

White supported Herbert Hoover for the Republican presidential nomination during the 1928 election. He was a delegate to the 1940 Republican National Convention from Tennessee's 3rd congressional district and supported Thomas E. Dewey and Robert A. Taft. He supported B. Carroll Reece, a member of the United States House of Representatives and member of the Republican National Committee, for the Republican vice-presidential nomination during the 1944 presidential election. He attempted to serve as a delegate to the 1944 Republican National Convention, but a rival delegate slate was seated instead. A resolution by White honoring Wendell Willkie was passed by the state house in 1945.

White led a Republican faction against Luke and Ed Morgan. In 1948, the two factions held two rival county conventions that sent contesting delegates to the state convention. The credentials committee voted four to three in favor of White's delegation. White opposed Robert Kemmer's, a member of his political opposition, reelection to the Tennessee Senate in the 1948 election. White's faction of the county party was recognized by the state party through a unanimous vote in 1950, rather than the faction led by Earl Smith.

=== Tennessee legislature ===
==== Elections ====
During the 1906 election White was endorsed by the Meigs County Republican Party for a seat in the state house from Meigs and Rhea counties despite him stating that he was not interested in running. John Neal, a member of the Democratic Party who represented the district, sought election to the state senate in the 1908 election. White was elected with the Republican nomination to succeed him.

White was the chair of the Rhea County Republican Convention in 1910, and the convention endorsed him for a seat in the state senate from the 9th district. The 9th District Republican Senatorial Convention gave him the nomination by acclamation and he was elected to succeed Neal. He was the youngest member of the state senate for that session. White was defeated by Democratic nominee Lewis Shepherd Pope in the 1912 election. U.S. Senator Newell Sanders gave White a job as a clerk for the Congressional Post Office after his defeat.

White defeated incumbent Democratic Representative Grover Harris in the 1932 election for a seat in the state house from the 10th floterial district. Democratic nominee Sue K. Hicks, who worked with White on the prosecution during the Scopes trial, defeated him in the 1934 election by twenty votes. White accused there of being fraud in the election, but the state house seated Hicks following the recommendation of an investigatory committee.

White defeated Democratic nominee George McKenzie in the 1936 election. He lost to Democratic nominee Herschel Denton by six vote in the 1938 election. White contested the results of the election and claimed there was fraud. He filed a petition with the Tennessee Election Commission seeking the removal of Ed Godsey and F.A. Grubb from the Meigs County Election Commission. White later withdrew his contest against Denton, who was seated. White defeated Democratic nominee R.J. Jaco in the 1940 election. He was reelected in 1942 and 1944. He defeated Democratic nominee D.F. Pope and independent candidate Carroll Tallent in the 1946 election.

Smith challenged White for the Republican nomination during the 1948 election and both claimed victory in the primary. Glenn Woodlee ordered the arrest of C.H. Smith, chair of the Rhea County Republican primary board and Earl's father, for not releasing an official canvass of the primary vote. He was fined $500 for contempt of court. Another member of the board was Earl's first cousin. The Republican state executive committee declared Smith the winner which brought criticism from Ralph Duggan, the Dewey's presidential campaign manager in Tennessee. White stated that the committee ruled against him because he supported Dewey and announced his independent candidacy. Democratic nominee Mary Shadow defeated White and Smith. She defeated him in the 1950 election. Four people were accused of tampering with the election, but no indictments were issued.

==== Tenure ====
White voted for Hillsman Taylor to be Speaker of the Tennessee House of Representatives in 1909. White ran to be the leader of the Republicans in the state house in 1933, but withdrew and M.G. Goodwin was selected instead. He served on the Labor and Education committees in the 1900s, Ways and Means committee in the 1930s, and Banking, Educator, and Labor committees in the 1940s. White was selected as the minority leader in the state house in 1936, and also nominated for speaker.

White supported the reelection of U.S. Senator James B. Frazier during the 1910–11 election. White sought an appointment to the Interstate Commerce Commission in 1937.

=== Superintendent ===
White became the superintendent of schools in Rhea County. He was appointed by the county court for his first five terms, until the state legislature changed the selection process in favor of an election and increased the term from two years to four years. He defeated independent candidate J.E. Atkinson in the 1928 election. The county court selected to appoint White as superintendent rather than incumbent Tallent in 1939, by a vote of 11 to 8.

White sought to be appointed as superintendent of public instruction by Governor Alfred A. Taylor, but J.B. Brown was appointed instead. In 1921, he appointed the first woman to serve on a school board in Rhea County. In 1929, White filed a $10,000 (equivalent to $187,500 in 2025) libel lawsuit against B.C. Kimmer, a former member of the state house and member of the county court, but his case was dismissed by Judge Leslie Rogers Darr.

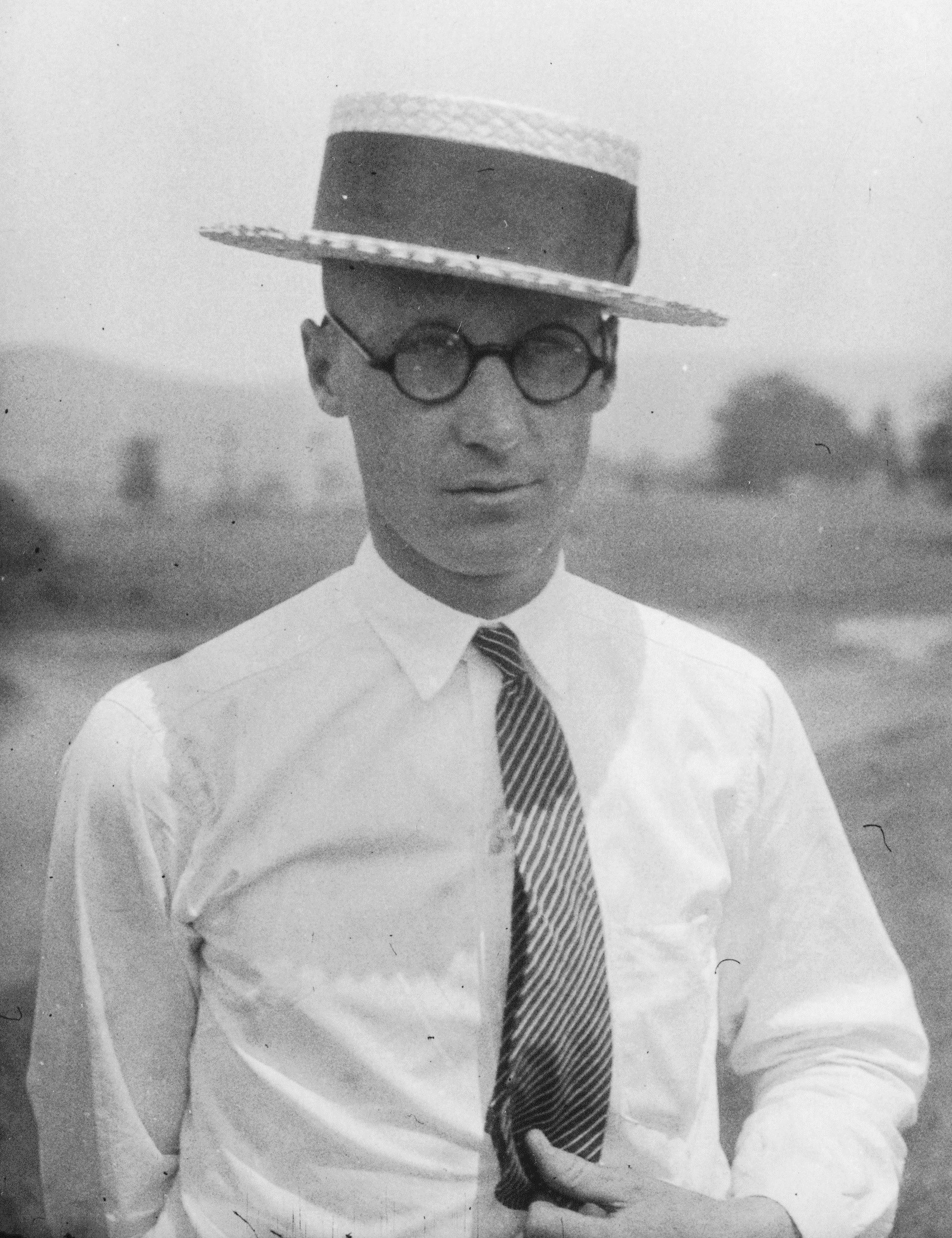
John T. Scopes was a teacher during White's tenure as superintendent and he was involved in the prosecution of the Scopes trial.

John T. Scopes was a teacher at one of the schools that White oversaw. He was one of the attorneys for prosecution of the Scopes trial. White replaced George Rappleyea in the prosecution on May 25, 1925, at the suggestion of Neal as Rappleyea believed in evolution. White invited Billy Sunday to assist in the prosecution, but he declined the offer.

In 1929, twenty-five property owners in Rhea County filed a lawsuit to remove White and seven members of the school board. In 1930, six members of the board were removed while White was acquitted, but fined $50 for being in contempt of court in 1930.

In 1931, the county court accused White and R.M. Green, chair of the county board of education, of misappropriating school funds. The school board rejected White's proposed list of teachers and then demanded their resignations after White's faction created a competing school board. W. N. Morgan, a supporter of White, issued a warrant against the members of the committee investigating White accusing them of "conspiring falsely to move and maintain a suit against Walter White". On August 18, the county court voted twelve to three to remove White and nine to six to remove Green from their positions. J.H. Miser was selected to replace White and C.F. McDonald was selected to replace Green. White returned to his position after Justice Alexander W. Chambliss suspended all of the actions while the case was being heard. The Tennessee Supreme Court ruled that the county court had the power to remove White and Miser assumed the position on November 27.

The county court voted to replace White with W.B. Follis in 1948, but an injunction prevented Follis from taking office until White's term expired in 1950. In 1949, the state supreme court ruled that it was not unconstitutional for an official to be both a county school superintendent and member of the state house. The injunction was dissolved on July 13, 1950, but a second injunction was issued on October 2. The injunction was dissolved and Virgil Watson was selected to replace him on October 11. Another injunction was issued, but Woodlee dismissed it and Watson took office on October 25. White sought another injunction, but a court ruled that his term ended on July 1, 1950.

=== Gubernatorial campaigns ===
County results of the 1926 Tennessee gubernatorial election

White announced his campaign for the Republican nomination in the 1924 gubernatorial election on September 17, 1923. The Rhea County Republican Party endorsed him during the primary. Bledsoe, Greene, and Meigs counties instructed their delegates to support White, but none of the candidates received the endorsement of the state party at the convention. He withdrew before the primary and endorsed T. F. Peck.

White was put up for the Republican nomination in the 1926 election without his permission and while he was supporting former governor Taylor. He announced his campaign after all of the other candidates, including Taylor, withdrew from the primary. Brown managed White's campaign. White lost the election to Democratic Governor Austin Peay.

== Death ==
White died at the age of 69 on February 14, 1951, due to a heart attack in Dayton, Tennessee, and was buried on February 18. A resolution by Shadow to mourn his death was passed by the Tennessee legislature.

== Political positions ==
White supported the prohibition of alcohol. He proposed legislation in 1909 to make campaign expenses public. In 1936, White supported the creation of $30 (equivalent to $696 in 2025) per month pension for old people. He proposed legislation to allocate $100,000 to create a printing facility in order to make textbooks free for elementary students.

White supported efforts to repeal poll taxes. White supported women's suffrage and called for Republicans in the Tennessee state legislature to ratify the Nineteenth Amendment in 1920. In 1943, he called for a convention to create a new state constitution which would eliminate the poll tax, lower the voting age to 18, creation of an income tax, four-year terms for all non-judicial officials, all elections held with the presidential election, and a requirement that all rulings from the state supreme court be unanimous.

White opposed the convict leasing system. In 1933, he proposed legislation to make ransom kidnapping punishable by death in response to the Lindbergh kidnapping. He proposed legislation to prohibit the usage of the death penalty on people under 21.

White was against evolution, sent a letter to U.S. Representative J. Will Taylor asking him to introduce legislation to deny funding to schools that taught evolution, and wrote anti-evolution legislation for William David Upshaw.

== Electoral history ==
1926 Tennessee gubernatorial election
Party	Candidate	Votes	%
Democratic	Austin Peay (incumbent)	84,979	64.76%
Republican	Walter White	46,238	35.24%
Total votes		131,217	100.00%

1934 Tennessee House of Representatives 10th floterial district election
Party	Candidate	Votes	%
Democratic	Sue K. Hicks	2,260	50.22%
Republican	Walter White (incumbent)	2,240	49.78%
Total votes		4,500	100.00%

1938 Tennessee House of Representatives 10th floterial district election
Party	Candidate	Votes	%
Democratic	Herschel Denton	1,938	50.08%
Republican	Walter White (incumbent)	1,932	49.92%
Total votes		3,870	100.00%

1946 Tennessee House of Representatives 10th floterial district election
Party	Candidate	Votes	%
Republican	Walter White (incumbent)	1,606	61.63%
Democratic	D.F. Pope	953	36.57%
Independent	Carroll Tallent	47	1.80%
Total votes		2,606	100.00%

1950 Tennessee House of Representatives 10th floterial district election
Party	Candidate	Votes	%
Democratic	Mary Shadow (incumbent)	3,402	52.45%
Republican	Walter White	3,084	47.55%
Total votes		6,486	100.00%

== Works cited ==
- Cornwell, Ilene (1988). Biographical Directory of the Tennessee General Assembly Volume III: 1901-1931. Tennessee Historical Commission. ISBN 0874020085.
- Bidd, Donald, ed. (2005). Guide to U.S. Elections. Vol. 2 (5 ed.). CQ Press. ISBN 1568029810.
