= Tennessee State Route System =

Highway system of Tennessee in the United States

State Route System of Tennessee
- Interstate, US Route, and Primary/Secondary State Routes

System information
- Maintained by TDOT
- Length: 14,150 mi (22,770 km)
- Formed: October 1, 1923

Highway names
- Interstates: Interstate XX (I-XX)
- US Highways: U.S. Route XX (US XX)
- State: State Route XX (SR XX)

System links
- Tennessee State Routes; Interstate; US; State

The State Route System of Tennessee is maintained and developed by the Tennessee Department of Transportation (TDOT) in the U.S. state of Tennessee. Currently the state has 14,150 miles (22,770 km) of state-maintained roadways, including 1,233 miles (1,984 km) of Interstate Highways and 13,077 miles (21,045 km) of State Highways. All of the U.S. Routes in Tennessee have a state route routed concurrently with them, though the state route is hidden and only signed along the green mile marker signs that display mileage within each county. (Note: This is not always the case. On recent construction projects, the hidden state route is signed on a normal state route sign.) The state route system in Tennessee was established in 1923. Since the 1983 renumbering, state routes have been divided into primary and secondary routes with separate shields used for each.

== Description ==
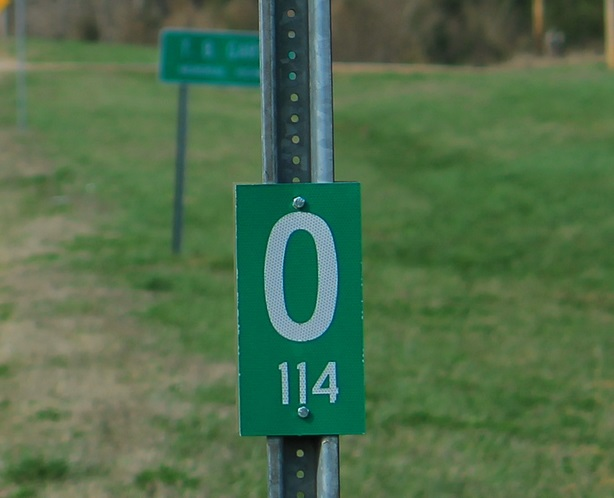
A Tennessee state route mile marker sign. The large number represents the county mileage, and the smaller number represents the state route number

State routes in Tennessee are divided into primary and secondary routes, the former being part of the federal-aid primary highway system, and the latter part of the federal-aid secondary highway system. Most routes with primary designations also have secondary designations; very few state routes in Tennessee have only primary designations. Secondary segments of dual-designated routes are often considered primary routes, however. The Tennessee Department of Transportation maintains these routes under the "State Highways" title of state law, but designates them as "State Routes"

State routes in Tennessee do not follow a systematic numbering system unlike the U.S. Highway System and some other states' highway systems. Rather, state route numbers have generally been designated sequentially as new routes have been incorporated into the system. Exceptions to this rule include placeholder designations for future Interstate Highways, including the former SR 840 (now I-840), and SR 690 (planned I-69). However, routes with similar numberings, especially short and newer secondary routes that were created during the 1983 takeover and renumbering, tend to be located close to each other. Older routes are generally more spread out. Similar to the California postmile system, mile markers for state routes in Tennessee are based on the mileage for each county, and not the entire route. The route's number is displayed in small text at the bottom of each mile marker. State routes that are overlaid on U.S. Routes are not signed; the route numbers are only displayed on the mile markers.

== History ==
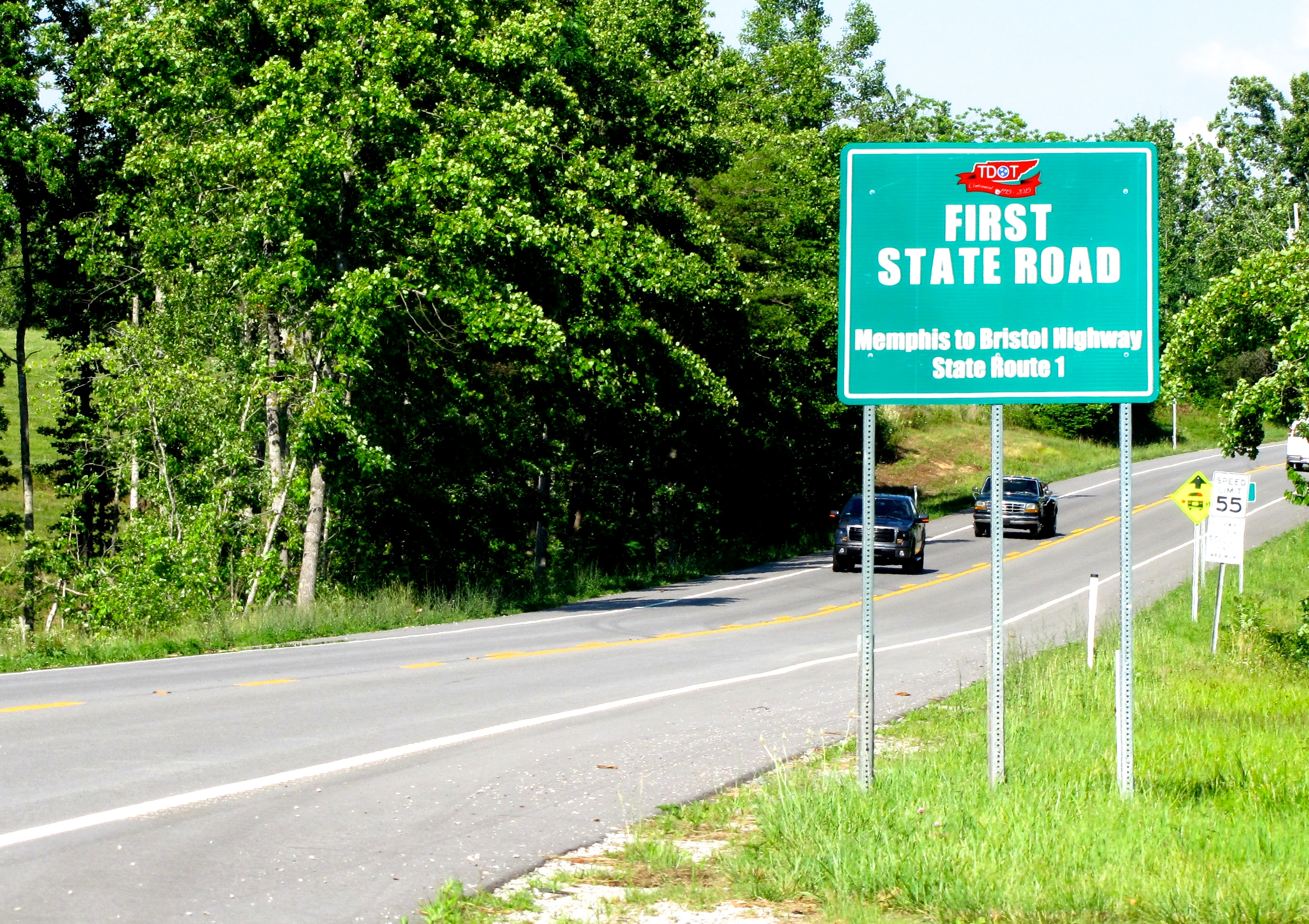
First State Road commemorative sign on US 70/SR 1 in Cumberland County. This highway was initially known as the Memphis to Bristol Highway

The Tennessee Department of Highways and Public Works was established by the Tennessee General Assembly in 1915 and tasked with constructing, maintaining, and improving roads throughout the state. That year, the 538-mile (866 km) Memphis to Bristol Highway, later State Route 1, was designated as the first state highway in Tennessee. The Federal Aid Road Act of 1916 required states to establish a highway system in cooperation with the United States Secretary of Agriculture for the purpose of the distribution of federal highway funds. The following year, the department was authorized by the state legislature to establish a state highway system. Both the federal aid system, which consisted of State Routes 1 through State Route 40, and the state aid system, which consisted of Routes 41 through 78, were jointly approved on October 1, 1923. This initial system consisted of 3,122.2 miles (5,024.7 km) of federal aid routes, and 1,522.2 miles (2,449.7 km) of state aid highways. When the United States Numbered Highway System was created in 1926, most of the federal aid state routes were assigned a U.S. Route designation as part of this system, but retained their state designations.

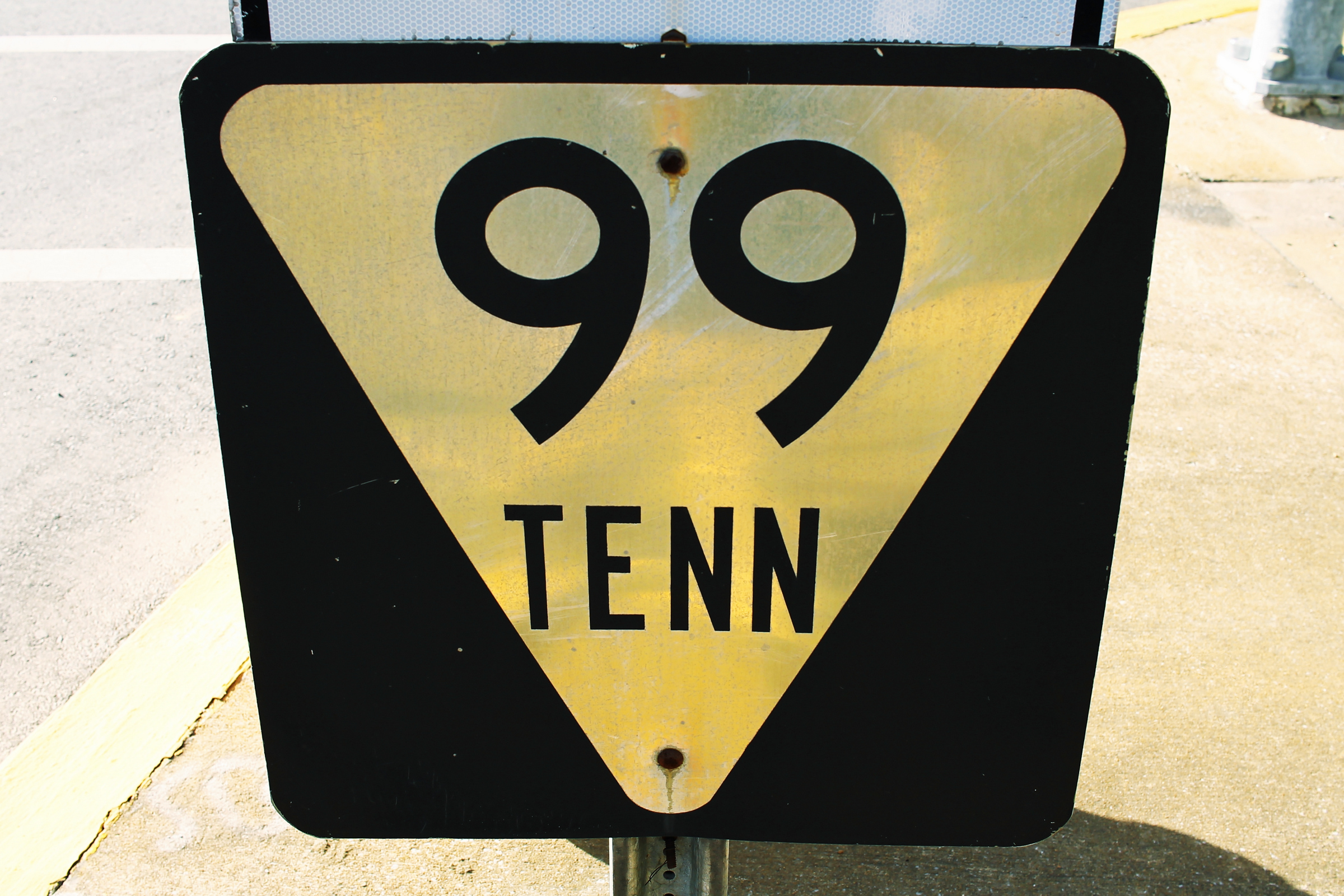
The original Tennessee state route shield from 1923 to 1983

Governor Austin Peay, who was elected in 1922, made road-building a central issue of his campaign. At the time, Tennessee was known as a "detour state", with many of its roads in poor condition compared to those of neighboring states. In 1924, the state implemented a two-cent gasoline tax for the purpose of improving roads, and throughout the 1920s, the department paved much of the newly-established state route system. As automobile usage increased over the next several decades, additional routes were added to the system. During this time, the state started using suffixed and special routes. Special designations included "-A" for alternate, "-Byp" for bypass, "-Bus" for business routes, "-Conn" and "-Spur" for connector and spur routes, and "-Temp" for temporary routes. By the time of the creation of the Interstate Highway System in 1956, the system had grown to approximately 8,400 miles (13,500 km) and roughly 170 numbered highways, including many special routes. Additional thoroughfares that connected to Interstate Highways were designated and taken over by the highway department in the years afterwards. In 1972, the Tennessee Department of Highways was renamed the Tennessee Department of Transportation (TDOT).

As traffic continued to increase throughout the state, cities and counties increasingly struggled to properly maintain their major thoroughfares, especially those with connected to Interstate Highways and other major roads. A 1983 study conducted by TDOT also found that a number of important roads were partially maintained by both the state and local governments. To address this problem, in 1983 the Tennessee General Assembly signed legislation allowing the state to assume control of 3,300 miles (5,300 km) of city and county maintained roads, and made an additional 11,500 miles (18,500 km) of rural roads eligible for state aid. This legislation was signed into law by Governor Lamar Alexander in May of that year. On July 1, 1983, TDOT took control of these roads, incorporating them into the state route system, and renumbered most of their special routes. As part of this process, a new functional classification system was adopted that divided state routes into secondary and primary routes, which was announced to the public in November 1983. This was done in an effort to reduce driver confusion, and new signs were posted throughout 1984 at a cost of $1.3 million (equivalent to $3.31 million in 2024). Secondary routes retained the original inverted triangle marker, with the "Tenn" removed.

== See also ==
- List of state routes in Tennessee
