= 1926 Tennessee gubernatorial election =

- November 2, 1926
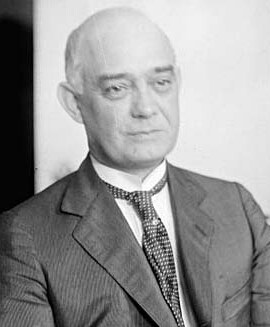

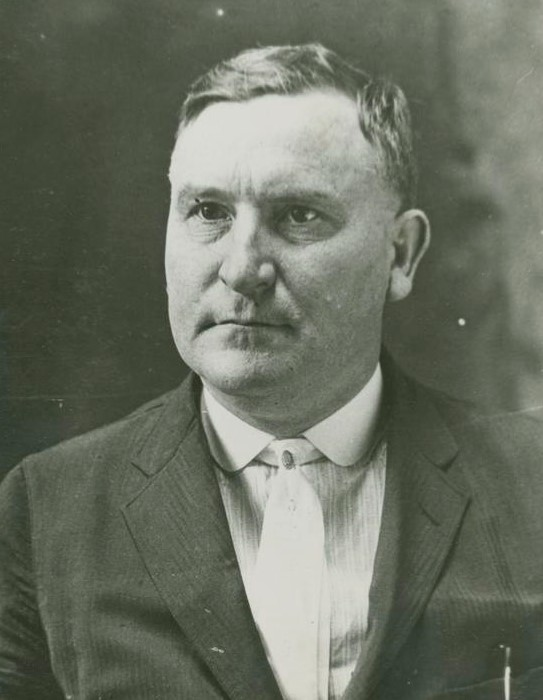
Nominee	Austin Peay	Walter White
Party	Democratic	Republican
Popular vote	84,979	46,238
Percentage	64.69%	35.20%
- County results Peay: 40–50% 50–60% 60–70% 70–80% 80–90% >90% White: 50–60% 60–70% 70–80%
Governor before election
Austin Peay
Democratic
Elected Governor
Austin Peay
Democratic

The 1926 Tennessee gubernatorial election was held on November 2, 1926. Incumbent Democratic governor Austin Peay defeated Republican nominee Walter White with 64.7% of the vote, improving on his performance from 1924.

Peay narrowly won the Democratic primary against Hill McAlister, defeating him by a little over 4%.

Shortly after beginning his third term, Peay's health began to decline and he died from a cerebral hemorrhage at 8:05 p.m. on October 2, 1927.

== Primary elections ==
Primary elections were held on August 5, 1926.

=== Democratic primary ===
Hill McAlister sought the Democratic Party's nomination against the incumbent, Austin Peay. Peay had radically transformed the state government, and had angered numerous members of his own party in the process, among them political bosses E. H. Crump of Memphis and Hilary Howse of Nashville. With the help of Crump and Howse, McAlister was able to win Shelby and Davidson counties, but Peay won the state's rural areas and East Tennessee, and defeated McAlister for the nomination by 8,057 votes.

==== Candidates ====
- Austin Peay, incumbent governor
- Hill McAlister, Tennessee State Treasurer
- John Randolph Neal Jr., attorney

==== Results ====
Democratic primary results
Party	Candidate	Votes	%
Democratic	Austin Peay (incumbent)	96,545	51.62%
Democratic	Hill McAlister	88,488	47.31%
Democratic	John Randolph Neal Jr.	2,015	1.08%
Total votes		187,048	100.00%

== General election ==
=== Candidates ===
Major party candidates

- Austin Peay, Democratic
- Walter White, Republican

=== Results ===
1926 Tennessee gubernatorial election
Party	Candidate	Votes	%	±%
Democratic	Austin Peay (incumbent)	84,979	64.69%	
Republican	Walter White	46,238	35.20%	
Independent	P. W. Williams	151	0.12%	
Total votes		131,368	100.00%	

== Works cited ==
- Bidd, Donald, ed. (2005). Guide to U.S. Elections. Vol. 2 (5 ed.). CQ Press. ISBN 1568029810.
