= Mary Shadow =

Member of the Tennessee House of Representatives

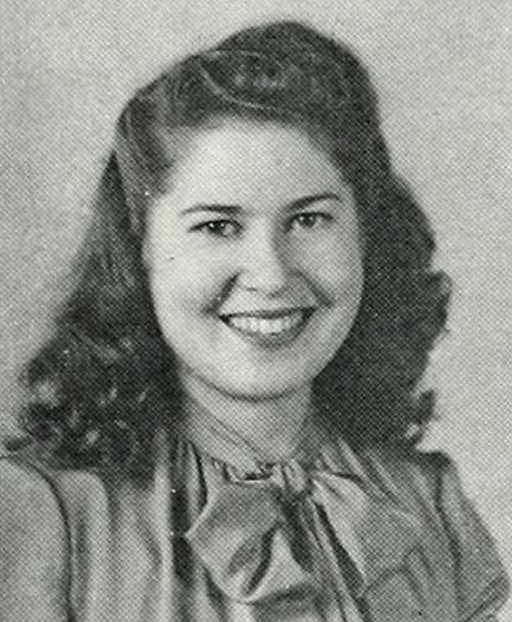

Member of the Tennessee House of Representatives from the 10th floterial district
- In office 1949–1953
- Preceded by: Walter White
- Succeeded by: J.R. Fischesser

Personal details
- Born: Mary Merrill Shadow; July 17, 1925; Winchester, Tennessee, U.S.
- Died: January 2, 1992 (aged 66); Bad Steben, Germany
- Political party: Democratic
- Spouse: David Lawrence Hill (m. 1950)
- Children: 7
- Education: Tennessee Wesleyan University; University of Alabama; University of Kentucky

Mary Merrill Shadow (July 17, 1925 – January 2, 1992) was an American politician who served in the Tennessee House of Representatives from the 10th floterial district from 1949 to 1953, as a member of the Democratic Party.

Shadow was born in Winchester, Tennessee, in 1925 and was educated at Tennessee Wesleyan University, University of Alabama, and the University of Kentucky. She defeated incumbent Representative Walter White for a seat in the state house and served until 1953. She was a delegate to the 1956 Democratic National Convention and unsuccessfully ran to be a delegate to Tennessee's constitutional convention and for a seat in the New Mexico House of Representatives.

== Early life and education ==
Mary Merrill Shadow was born in Winchester, Tennessee, on July 17, 1925 to Willis Albert Shadow and Mary Merrill Ermlich. She received a scholarship to the University of Tennessee at Chattanooga in 1943. She graduated from Tennessee Wesleyan University in 1945, University of Tennessee in 1947, and from University of Alabama and University of Kentucky with a Master of Public Administration in 1948. She married David Lawrence Hill, with whom she had seven children, on December 31, 1950.

Shadow became a political science professor at Wesleyan in 1948. She was appointed as youth chair of the International Christian University's $10 million fundraising campaign in 1950.

Shadow was a member of the Garden Club of America, League of Women Voters, American Association of University Women, and Zeta Tau Alpha.

== Career ==
Shadow was an opponent of E. H. Crump's political machine. Following the Battle of Athens she wrote a research paper on the government of McMinn County, Tennessee. She became secretary-treasurer of the Meigs County Young Democratic Club in 1949. She became chair of the college activities divisions in the Young Democratic Clubs of America.

Shadow announced her campaign for the Democratic nomination for a seat in the Tennessee House of Representatives from the 10th floterial district on April 25, 1948. She defeated incumbent Representative Walter White and Republican nominee Earl Mack Smith in the 1948 election after spending $270. She was the only woman elected to the state legislature in that election and the first unmarried woman elected to the state legislature, and received fourteen marriage proposals after her victory. She announced her reelection campaign on June 2, 1950, and defeated White in the election. She did not seek reelection in 1952, and was succeeded by J.R. Fischesser.

Shadow was selected as secretary of the Democratic caucus in the state house in 1949. The Tennessee Press Corps voted her as "one of the five most able and effective members of the House of Representatives" during the 77th session. She was a member of a delegation sent by the Tennessee General Assembly to the second inauguration of Harry S. Truman. During her tenure in the state house she served on the Finance and Ways and Means committees.

Shadow ran to represent Davidson County, Tennessee, as a delegate to a constitutional convention in the 1952 election, but lost. She was a delegate to the 1956 Democratic National Convention from New Mexico and supported Adlai Stevenson II.

== Later life ==
Shadow and her family moved to New Mexico in 1952. She ran for a seat in the New Mexico House of Representatives in the 1956 election and was the only female Democratic nominee for state house, but lost to Republican nominee Thomas R. Roberts. Their family moved to Connecticut in 1958, where she became a lecturer in gardening and nutrition. Her husband worked as a theoretical nuclear physicist. She died on January 2, 1992, in Bad Steben, Germany.

== Political positions ==
Shadow supported rewriting the Constitution of Tennessee, proposed legislation to allow women to serve on petit and grand juries, supported legislation to repeal anti-closed shop legislation, supported the elimination of poll taxes, and proposed a repeal in 1951 of the Butler Act which prevented the teaching of human evolution in state schools. The act was not repealed until 1967.

== Electoral history ==
1950 Tennessee House of Representatives 10th floterial district election
Party	Candidate	Votes	%
Democratic	Mary Shadow (incumbent)	3,402	52.45%
Republican	Walter White	3,084	47.55%
Total votes		6,486	100.00%

1956 New Mexico House of Representatives election
Party	Candidate	Votes	%
Republican	Thomas R. Roberts	2,464	53.68%
Democratic	Mary Shadow	2,126	46.32%
Total votes		4,590	100.00%

== Works cited ==
- Cornwell, Ilene (1989). Biographical Directory of the Tennessee General Assembly Volume IV: 1931-1951. Tennessee Historical Commission. ISBN 0874020085.
