= Ray Jenkins =

American lawyer (1897–1980)

- Born: Ray Howard Jenkins; March 18, 1897; Cherokee County, North Carolina, United States
- Died: December 26, 1980 (aged 83); Knoxville, Tennessee
- Education: University of Tennessee
- Occupation: Lawyer
- Years active: 1920–1980
- Notable work: The Terror of Tellico Plains: The Memoirs of Ray H. Jenkins (1979)
- Political party: Republican
- Spouse(s): Eva Nash (1926–1962, her death); Eva Crouch Tedder
- Children: Eva Lois
- Parent(s): Columbus Sheridan Jenkins and Catherine Amanda Nicholson

Ray Howard Jenkins (March 18, 1897 – December 26, 1980) was an American lawyer, active primarily in Knoxville, Tennessee, and the surrounding region, throughout much of the 20th century. He is best known for his role as special counsel to the Senate Subcommittee on Investigations during the 1954 Army-McCarthy Hearings, earning broad praise for his aggressive questioning of the hearings' two complainants, Senator Joseph McCarthy and Secretary of the Army Robert T. Stevens. Jenkins appeared on the cover of Time at the height of the hearings on May 17, 1954.

In a career that spanned nearly six decades, Jenkins defended over 600 accused murderers, and never lost a client to the death penalty. At the time of the Army-McCarthy Hearings, he was described as "the best trial lawyer in East Tennessee." Jenkins' courtroom style, which often involved ruthlessly assailing the character of his clients' accusers, earned him the nickname, "The Terror of Tellico Plains."

== Early life ==
Jenkins was born in Unaka (in Cherokee County), the second child of Columbus Sheridan "Lum" Jenkins, a physician, and Amanda Nicholson. When Jenkins was still young, the family moved across the mountains to Monroe County, Tennessee, initially settling in the Rural Vale community, but moving to Tellico Plains within a few years. Lum Jenkins worked as a doctor for the Babcock Lumber Company, and served as the first mayor of Tellico Plains.

At the age of 13, Ray Jenkins enrolled in the preparatory department at Maryville College, but moved back home upon the opening of Tellico Plains High School, from which he eventually graduated. In 1916, he enlisted in Company M of the U.S. Army's 117th Infantry, which was part of the force tasked with capturing Mexican outlaw Pancho Villa. While stationed in Texas, Jenkins was court-martialed for his role in the killing of a fellow soldier, but successfully defended himself by pointing out that the dead soldier had attacked or threatened others in the company. He later wrote that this experience taught him a lesson he would remember throughout his legal career: "When a bully has been killed, prove enough on him and paint him so mean that the jury will want to dig him up and kill him again."

After returning home, Jenkins enrolled in the University of Tennessee, but upon the U.S. entry into World War I, he again enlisted, this time in the Navy, and was stationed in San Diego for the duration of the war. After the war, he returned to U.T., where obtained his law degree in 1920. In 1919, a year before his graduation, he passed the bar exam.

== Early legal career ==
Jenkins initially worked in the law office of aging Knoxville attorney Alvin Johnson. He mostly argued justice of the peace cases late at night in McAnnally Flats and other run-down parts of Knoxville. He also worked as a debt collector for the Haynes-Henson Shoe Company, later writing that he hunted down debtors across the region and "pleaded, cajoled, bullied and threatened" them until they paid.

In 1922, Jenkins started his own practice. One of his first major cases came when he defended Jim Brookshire, a Tellico Plains moonshiner accused of killing his wife. While Brookshire was convicted, he avoided the death penalty, to the outrage of the locals. In 1927, Jenkins formed a partnership with Erby Jenkins (no relation). Erby's younger brother, Aubrey, joined the firm in 1940.

In 1938, Jenkins defended Knoxville bail bondsman Ed McNew in a high-profile case in which McNew was accused of shooting at a photographer trying to take his picture. The evidence against McNew was overwhelming, and included a photograph of him in the act of firing a pistol right at the photographer (the photograph was published in Life magazine). In court, Jenkins accused the photographer of harassing and goading McNew, and even had McNew, who had fallen ill, wheeled in on a stretcher to testify. McNew was eventually acquitted of attempted murder, but convicted of lesser charges and fined.

In 1947, Jenkins defended Burkett Ivins, a revenue agent who had been accused of killing a man in Etowah, Tennessee. The case was argued before Judge Sue K. Hicks, who at one point gave Jenkins a "stern lecture" in front of the packed courtroom for showing up late. During jury selection, Jenkins continuously passed on prospective jurors as Ivins suspected they had personal grievances against him (he was rumored to have killed a number of area moonshiners). The highly charged and hard-fought trial eventually ended in a hung jury. Ivins was killed by a car bomb before the second trial began.

== Army-McCarthy Hearings ==
In the Spring of 1954, at the height of the Second Red Scare, the Senate conducted hearings to investigate conflicting accusations involving the Army and Senator Joseph McCarthy. Secretary of the Army Robert Stevens alleged that McCarthy had sought preferential treatment for his former aide, David Schine, whereas McCarthy counter-charged that the accusations were made in retaliation for McCarthy's allegations that Communists had infiltrated the Army.

The Senate Subcommittee on Investigations initially retained Boston lawyer Samuel Sears as counsel, but Sears resigned when questions arose regarding his impartiality. After an exhaustive search, the committee chose Jenkins as counsel, based in part on a recommendation by Congressman Howard Baker Sr., a former classmate of Jenkins. The committee's minority (Democratic) party members retained as counsel Robert F. Kennedy. The committee was chaired by Senator Karl Mundt, whom Jenkins would later describe as a "slave driver" who would call all hours of the night.

Jenkins' role in the hearings required him to both question and cross-examine witnesses, as though he was both defense attorney and prosecutor. This role particularly caught Stevens (the first to be examined) off guard. His initial questioning of Stevens was congenial, provoking constant laughter from the chamber. Then, as McCarthy biographer Lately Thomas explained, "the big, rangy Tennessean, with unruly hair and underslung jaw, changed his manner as he bore down on the well-meaning but ineffective Army head." His suddenly aggressive cross-examination prompted numerous objections from Stevens' counsel, Joseph Welch, and numerous interruptions from McCarthy.

At the end of the hearings, Mundt tasked Jenkins with condensing the hearings' 72-volume transcript for the committee to form its report. In his memoirs, Jenkins blasted the committee's final report, which all but cleared McCarthy and criticized (but excused) the actions of Stevens, calling it a "whitewash" in regard to the former and "doubletalk" in regard to the latter. Jenkins thought the hearings clearly showed that both figures had committed "impugnable acts."

The committee's minority party report, prepared by Kennedy, condemned the actions of both McCarthy and Stevens. Jenkins endorsed this report, stating in his memoirs he would have "voted for that verdict wholeheartedly." He also praised Kennedy as a person, calling him "a man of impeccable character, above everything low or venal."

== Later legal career ==
In 1954, shortly after the Army-McCarthy Hearings, Jenkins joined the team to defend Clarice Kidd Shoemaker, a Scott County woman accused of killing her husband in a jealous rage. The prosecutor was future senator Howard Baker Jr., who according to Jenkins, "presented brilliantly" the case against Shoemaker. Jenkins grilled the dead man's mistress on the stand, read aloud to the jury a passionate letter she had written him, and painted her as a ruthless homewrecker. Following Shoemaker's tearful testimony, she was promptly acquitted.

In 1957, Jenkins again took part in a nationally-publicized trial when he joined the defense team of Colonel John C. Nickerson Jr., an Army officer court-martialed for leaking classified information. Nickerson had been part of a team tasked with developing an Intercontinental Ballistic Missile, and had leaked information about the team's progress after the Defense Department cancelled the Army's involvement in the project. The Army eventually dropped the most serious charges when the defense team requested access to classified documents, and Nickerson was convicted of only minor offenses.

In 1961, Jenkins helped defend eccentric Knoxville businessman and politician Cas Walker, who had been accused of tax evasion. Jenkins carefully selected a jury of "the common people," from whom Walker had long drawn undying support. The federal prosecutors relied heavily on numerical data in presenting their case, while the defense portrayed Walker as the victim of an overly-aggressive investigation, and called a string of witnesses to vouch for Walker's honesty. Walker was acquitted.

In 1962, Jenkins helped defend June Newberry, a Lenoir City woman accused of murdering Ann Gowder, the mistress of her husband, Raymond. The defense claimed Newberry was temporarily insane, having been provoked by taunting from Gowder. Throughout the trial, Jenkins ruthlessly assailed Raymond Newberry (who refused to attend the hearings) as the true culprit, most notably in his dramatic closing argument, when he intermittently shouted, "Where are you, Raymond?" Jenkins published this closing argument in its entirety in his 1979 memoir. Newberry was convicted of voluntary manslaughter, and given a light sentence.

== Other endeavors ==
In 1939, Jenkins ran for the 2nd District congressional seat, which was vacant following the death of Congressman J. Will Taylor, but lost in the Republican primary to John Jennings. He also worked as a campaign manager for both Senator Howard Baker Sr., and gubernatorial candidate Arthur Bruce. In 1954, following the Army-McCarthy Hearings, Tennessee Republicans attempted to recruit Jenkins to run against Democratic Senator (and fellow Monroe Countian) Estes Kefauver, but Jenkins refused.

Jenkins praised the Warren Court's decision in Brown v. Board of Education (1954), calling the decision "courageous" and likening it to a second Emancipation Proclamation. In 1956, Clinton High School (just north of Knoxville) admitted 12 African American students in compliance with Brown, leading to rampant violence by segregationists in subsequent months. Jenkins was asked to get involved on behalf of several pro-segregation activists, but he refused, stating in an interview that all Americans had a right to an education, "regardless of race, creed, or color."

In the late 1960s and 1970s, Jenkins advocated the Tennessee Valley Authority's Tellico Dam project, which affected a significant portion of his native Monroe County. He spoke in favor of the dam before the Senate Appropriations Committee in 1965, and blasted environmentalists who stalled the project with the snail-darter controversy in 1975. In his memoir, he stated, "the snail darter is good for exactly nothing."

In 1960, Jenkins sold his Sequoyah Hills house, which had been built by his in-laws, the Nash family, to the University of Tennessee for use as a manse for the school's presidents. The house still stands on Cherokee Boulevard, though the university has since sold it.

Jenkins' memoir, entitled, The Terror of Tellico Plains, was published by the East Tennessee Historical Society in 1979.

== See also ==
- James Alexander Fowler
- John Randolph Neal Jr.
