= Austins Mill, Tennessee =

Unincorporated community in Tennessee, US

Coordinates: 36°22′24″N 83°00′24″W

Austins Mill is an unincorporated community in Hawkins County, Tennessee, in the United States. It is located south of Rogersville along the Holston River (Cherokee Lake).

== History ==
A post office called Austin's Mills was established in 1866, and remained in operation until it was discontinued in 1892. The origin of the name is uncertain, though J.H. McCrary, an early-20th century resident, suggested the name is derived from a flour mill constructed by the Austin family about a mile upstream from the community. The mill was still in operation in the early 1900s, and a plant at the mill provided electricity to Rogersville. The community thrived as a transloading station during this period, where lumber was gathered and loaded onto boats (and later trains) for transport out of the region. The mill, lumber yard, and numerous other structures were demolished and a large portion of the community was inundated when the Tennessee Valley Authority completed Cherokee Dam in the 1940s.

== See also ==
- Loyston, Tennessee
- Rhea Springs, Tennessee
