= David L. Hill =

American nuclear physicist (1919–2008)

- Hill c. 1960s
- Born: David Lawrence Hill; November 11, 1919; Booneville, Mississippi, U.S.
- Died: December 14, 2008 (aged 89); Brighton, Monroe County, New York, U.S.
- Education: California Institute of Technology (BS); Princeton University (MS, PhD)
- Known for: Chairman of the Federation of American Scientists; Successfully testifying against the nomination of Lewis Strauss as Secretary of Commerce
- Spouse: Mary Shadow (m. 1950; died 1992)
- Partner: Sharon Vincent
- Children: 7
- Scientific career
- Fields: Nuclear physics
- Workplaces: Metallurgical Laboratory; Vanderbilt University; Los Alamos National Laboratory
- Thesis: Dynamical analysis of nuclear fission (1951)
- Doctoral advisor: John Archibald Wheeler

David Lawrence Hill (November 11, 1919 – December 14, 2008) was an American nuclear physicist who worked on the Manhattan Project during World War II and was head of the Federation of American Scientists. He is best known for his 1959 testimony against the nomination of Lewis Strauss as United States Secretary of Commerce.

== Early life ==
David L. Hill was born in Booneville, Mississippi on 11 November 1919. He was the only child of David A. Hill Jr. and Mabel C. Brown, a retired elementary school teacher.

== Personal life ==
Hill married Mary Shadow on December 31, 1950, with whom he had seven children, four sons and three daughters. Their names were David Hill, Mary Claire Wise, Robert L. Hill, John F. Hill, Cynthia A. Hughes, Sandra E. Hill, and James A. Hill. After the death of his wife in 1992, Hill never remarried but would then move to Rochester, where he met Sharon Vincent, his partner with whom he would spend the rest of his life. He died on December 14, 2008, at the age of 89 in Brighton, New York.

== Education ==
Hill went to the California Institute of Technology for his undergraduate degree. During his time at Caltech, he was praised for his scientific knowledge. He disassembled a Model T and reassembled it inside the dorm room of one of his friends as a prank, with the help of his closest colleagues. He was a chair at a social committee, whilst possessing the most class hours with the highest grade point average. He graduated in 1942.

From September 1946 to July 1949, Hill went to Princeton University to gain his Ph.D. He left in 1949 with his degree mostly completed, however, he did not fully complete his thesis. He would return to Princeton from time to time to work on a paper published in 1953 titled "Nuclear Constitution and the Interpretation of Fission Phenomena." He was awarded his Ph.D. in 1951.

== World War II ==
After graduating from the California Institute of Technology in 1942, he joined Enrico Fermi's team at the Metallurgical Laboratory in Chicago, where he remained for the duration of the war. He was one of the team of scientists who built the Chicago Pile-1, the world's first artificial nuclear reactor. In 1945 he was one of 70 scientists to sign the Szilárd petition asking President Harry Truman to warn the Japanese before the usage of the atomic bomb.

== Postwar career ==
After the war, he received his Ph.D. in nuclear physics from Princeton University in 1951. His doctoral advisor was John Archibald Wheeler. He was an assistant professor at Vanderbilt University and then from 1954 to 1958 worked as a theoretical physicist at the Los Alamos National Laboratory.

In 1953, Hill, a chairman for the Federation of American Scientists, criticized a speech by Lewis Strauss that defended his opposition to the shipping of radioisotopes to Norway in 1949. In 1959, he testified as a private citizen before the Commerce Committee of the United States Senate to oppose President Eisenhower's nomination of Lewis Strauss as Secretary of Commerce, saying that "most of the scientists in this country would prefer to see Mr. Strauss completely out of the Government". Hill accused Strauss of a lack of integrity, an obsessive quest for personal approval, persistent arrogance, and personal vindictiveness. Among issues cited were Strauss's aforementioned opposition to the shipping of radioisotopes in 1949 and his role in the security hearing that removed Robert Oppenheimer's security clearance. The Senate voted down Strauss's nomination.

== Later years ==
Hill spent the later part of his career working in the private sector, founding research and development companies including Nanosecond Systems Inc., a manufacturer of high-precision measuring equipment, and serving as president of Harbor Research Corp., a patent enforcement and investment company.

Southport was developed in 1960 by Hill and was based in Fairfield, Connecticut. The company's name was later changed to Nanosecond Systems Inc in 1962. It was designed to develop and manufacture measuring instruments and equipment used for scientific and optical purposes. The company did face legal actions when Hill was sued on April 9, 1969 for violating the Securities Act.

Shareholders of Patent Enforcement Fund, Inc., filed a shareholder derivative suit in 1998 against that company claiming that Hill had fraudulently siphoned funds from it. They obtained a default judgement against the company. Hill intervened in the lawsuit but a judgement was entered against the company. Hill's appeal was denied by the Second Circuit.

== Publications ==
In October 1945, Hill published an article in Life magazine with physicist Eugene Rabinowitch and physical chemist John A. Simpson Jr. titled: "The Atomic Scientists Speak Up: Nuclear Physicists Say There is No Secrecy in Atomic Bomb and No Defense Against it". In the article the physicists speak on the many concerns individuals have for the future of the world with the atomic bomb now present. They did this by thoughtfully answering six common questions associated with the issue.

Hill's 1953 paper "Nuclear Constitution and the Interpretation of Fission Phenomena" with John Archibald Wheeler on collective motion of nucleons in the atomic nuclei has been cited by thousands of other papers. The key equations have been referred to as the Hill-Wheeler equation or Hill-Wheeler-Griffin equation. In the early stages of drafting their paper, Niels Bohr was in communication with Hill and Wheeler to contribute to the research and writing of the paper, so he could be a co-author. It ended up not happening for unknown reasons that Hill could not remember and the paper was later published with only Hill's and Wheeler's names.

In February 1968, Hill and many other scientists had personal letters published in Physics Today magazine. The magazine article was titled, "More on APS and Public Issues ...". The physicists either showed their support or disapproval for the proposed amendment from the American Physical Society (APS) constitution in their letters. In Hill's letter he expresses his concerns on voting, stating that only those who are members of the group should be able to vote on issues related to science and that it would not be a good idea to vote on political issues unrelated to their field of work.

== In media ==
Hill was portrayed by Rami Malek in the July 2023 Christopher Nolan film Oppenheimer. Lines in Hill's testimony in the film against the nomination of Strauss (portrayed by Robert Downey Jr.) were adapted directly from Hill's actual testimony in 1959.

== Works cited ==
- Cornwell, Ilene (1989). Biographical Directory of the Tennessee General Assembly Volume IV: 1931-1951. Tennessee Historical Commission. ISBN 0-87402-008-5.
