= George Rappleyea =

Scopes Trial figure (1894–1966)

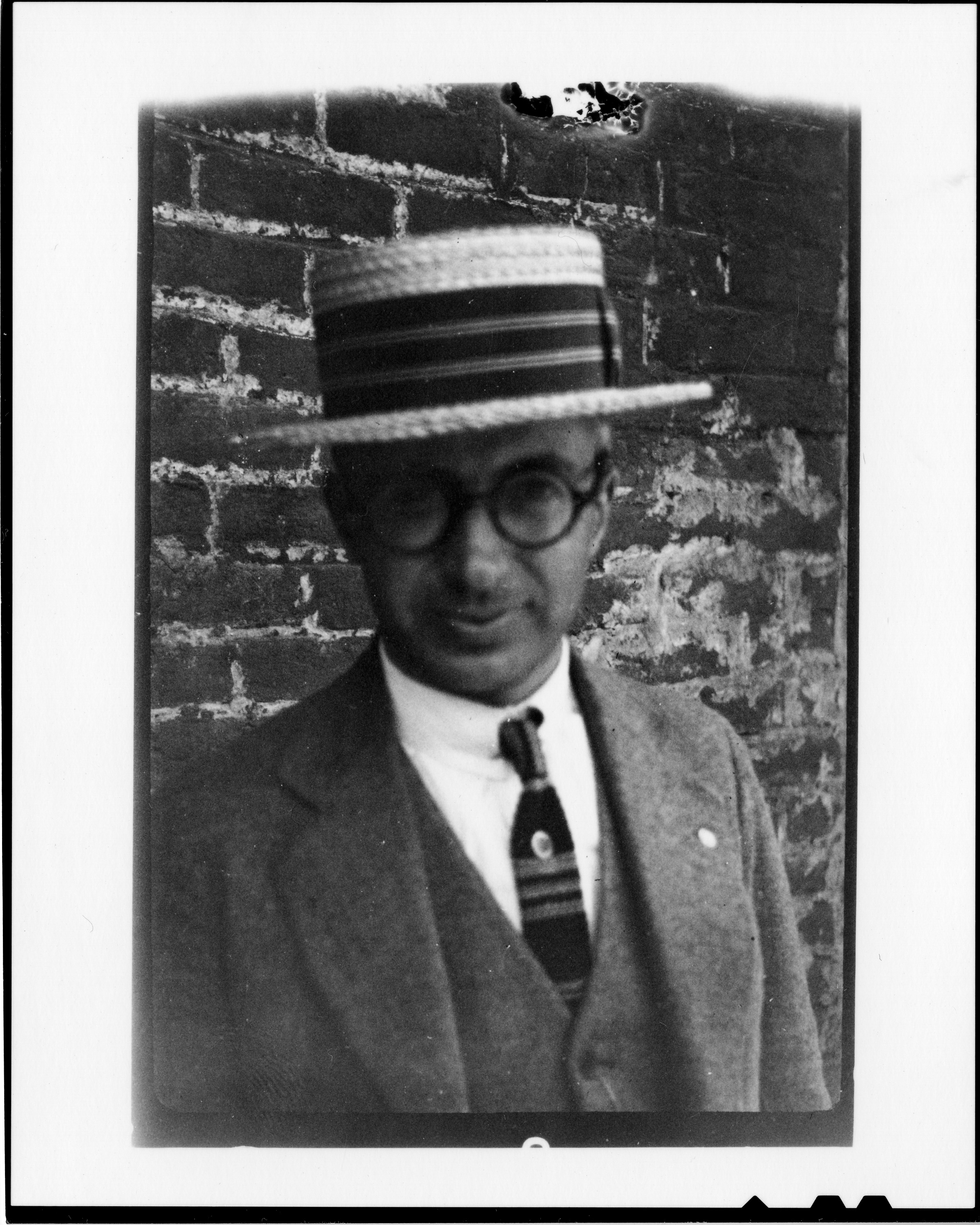
George Rappleyea in June 1925

George Washington Rappleyea (July 4, 1894 – August 29, 1966) was an American metallurgical engineer and the manager of the Cumberland Coal and Iron Company in Dayton, Tennessee. He held this position in the summer of 1925 when he became the chief architect of the Scopes trial. During a meeting at Robinson's Drug Store, it was Rappleyea who convinced a group of Dayton businessmen to sponsor a test case of the Butler Act, which prohibited the teaching of evolution in the state's schools. Rappleyea convinced John T. Scopes to be the defendant in the famous "Monkey" Trial.

George Washington Rappleyea was noted for his part in the Scopes Evolution Trial, his work as a Vice President of the Higgins Boat Company, which made landing craft for use in WWII, his scientific patents, and his part in weapons procurement for a raid on Cuba.

The name is often spelled "Rappalyea" but the spelling "Rappleyea" is what appears in L. Sprague de Camp's book The Great Monkey Trial and the author interviewed Rappleyea before his death.

== Early life ==
He was born on July 4, 1894, in New York City to George M. Rappleyea and Marian Rogers. His family was descended from the earliest Dutch settlers in what became New York State. His father was an assistant manager of various hotels between Times Square and Herald Square in New York City.

As a boy, he lived in New York City and sold newspapers at Times Square. At the age of 8, he was taking art lessons from Charles Wright, the art editor of the magazine section of the New York Sunday Herald.

His father bought a hotel in Newburgh, New York, on the Hudson River about 50 miles (80 km) from New York City. At the age of 12, George took art lessons at Newburgh from Sid Turner of the Newburgh Daily News. Late in his life he claimed these art lessons helped him with some of his inventions.

In 1912 at the age of 18, he graduated from Ohio Northern College in Ada, Ohio, with a degree in civil engineering. He was a private in the army signal corps program while at college.

Rappleyea was a Second Lieutenant in the Army Corps of Engineers during World War I.

== Scopes Trial ==
In 1922, he took a job as Superintendent of the Cumberland Coal and Iron Company and moved from New York to Dayton, Tennessee. The company was having financial problems. He met a nurse named Ova Corvin there after going to the hospital for a snake bite and later married her.

In early 1925, the Tennessee Legislature passed the Butler Act forbidding the teaching of the theory of evolution in public schools. On May 4, 1925, an article in the Chattanooga Times reported that the American Civil Liberties Union (ACLU) was interested in challenging the law. Rappleyea read the article and became interested in the idea of taking up the challenge.

There were a few reasons that he might have had this interest. The first was that although he was a member of, and at one time taught Sunday school, at the Methodist Church, he was in agreement with the evolution theory. The second possible reason may have involved a situation where he had attended a funeral for a 6-year-old boy, the son of one of his workers, who died in a railroad accident. While there, he heard the preacher tell the parents of the deceased that he would probably go to hell because he was not baptized by the church. The most prominent reason was that he recognized that the community could benefit economically from having what he knew would be a big trial in Dayton.

On May 5, 1925, Rappleyea met with Walter White, the superintendent of the Rhea County schools, and a young lawyer named Sue K. Hicks, at Robinson's Drug Store in Dayton, Tennessee, and proposed his idea of challenging the law. At this time, the village was having hard economic times so the group recognized the possible significance of the idea.

They decided that biology teacher John T. Scopes would be a good candidate to challenge the law. They sent a boy to find him on the tennis court and invited him to the discussion. He heard the proposal and felt sympathetic to the idea. He admitted to having taught evolution to his students; this was later found to be a possible fabrication.

With this agreement, Rappleyea arranged to have Scopes arrested for disobeying the Butler Law. When the word got out about the case, William Jennings Bryan, a fundamentalist leader who had not tried a lawsuit in 25 years, volunteered to help prosecute Scopes; however he died in Dayton five days after the trial and never delivered his anticipated speech. Many blamed Rappleyea for Bryan's death.

Rappleyea went to New York City to discuss the situation with the ACLU and get their financial assistance for a defending lawyer. When Clarence Darrow heard that Bryan was going to prosecute the case, he volunteered to be the defending lawyer. This set the stage for the "trial of the century".

The trial, which started on July 21, 1925, brought in news reporters and spectators from across the country. The scene attracted circus performers with monkeys and an ape. The court house temperature was very high and the court room so full that they moved the trial outdoors at one point. The debate between Bryan and Darrow was long and loud. Darrow induced Bryan to take the stand as defense witness on the Bible and they had a lively debate.

In the end, Scopes lost the trial because he had admitted that he taught evolution and this was contrary to the law. The defense had wanted to appeal the decision to higher courts in order to make a challenge to the basis of the law itself, but this was rebuffed. Scopes was fined $100, but never paid it; although his conviction was upheld on appeal, the fine was thrown out for technical reasons.

== Boatbuilding and WWII ==
By 1937, George had moved to Baltimore, Maryland, where he was a representative for boatyards. In January 1937 he attended a meeting in New York City to form the American Association of Boat Builders and Repairers. On October 25, 1937, he was Director of the Wheeler Shipyard and organized a war game of 19 planes versus 10 power boats over Long Island Sound in New York where the planes dropped flour bags to hit the boats and the boats took pictures of the planes. The results of the fight were announced on November 7, 1937, and the planes won the battle.

By 1939, he had moved to New Orleans, Louisiana. On December 27, 1939, he was instrumental in training boaters to get a charter to join the United States Power Squadrons. He became a Vice President of Higgins Boat Industries, a company that manufactured the famous Higgins landing crafts used in World War II. On December 31, 1939, he represented the company by complaining to the Navy about their awarding a boat contract to the British.

On May 24, 1942, he was appointed Vice President of the American Boating Association where he was head of the Legislative Committee. He authored at least 3 books while working for Higgins. In 1943, a four-page book "Navigation Wrinkles for Combat Motor Boats" was published. In 1944, he published the books "Higgins System of Transportation", 18 pages, and "Caribbean Fishing", 436 pages. On September 30, 1944, "The New York Times" had an article about a patent he won on an improvement in aerial mapping cameras. In 1945, his book "Navigation Wrinkles for Combat Motor Boats" was republished with 130 pages. On April 21, 1946, he attended two boat shows in New York City as a Higgins retiree with an exhibit for marine plasticized bonded wood.

== Post-WWII conspiracy ==
In 1946, he became Treasurer of Marsallis Construction Company in New Orleans. One of the leaders of the company was Claude Eatherly, a pilot who claimed to have been instrumental in dropping the atomic bomb on Japan. They were accumulating weapons including guns, ammunition, landing ships, tanks, planes and even a cache of atomic weapons which were stored in Gulfport, Mississippi. This was a secret operation that was later divulged in a book by some of the pilots to be a CIA backed operation to destabilize the government of Cuba. These activities were detailed in the 1964 book "The Hiroshima Pilot" by William Bradford Huie.

On March 2, 1947, Rappleyea was arrested in New Orleans with others for conspiracy to violate the National Firearms Act as Secretary Treasurer of Marsallis Construction Company. On March 31, 1948, he pleaded guilty in Biloxi, Mississippi Federal Court to conspiracy to ship arms and ammunition to British Honduras. He received a one-year sentence. On April 24, 1948, he started his sentence in the Federal Correctional Institution at Texarkana, Texas.

== Later life ==
In September 1951, he was living at Southport, North Carolina, as Director of the "Tropical Agricultural Research Laboratory, Inc." He had an invention which was featured in an article in "Popular Mechanics" magazine about a building material made from molasses, plastic, and sand called "Plasmofalt". The material was hailed as breakthrough for inexpensive building materials. The material was also useful for making quick landing fields for the military on sandy islands and for driveways.

At least two structures were made with the material, one in Southport, North Carolina, and another at the University of New Mexico. He also planned to build a factory to produce "Plasmofalt" in New Jersey. In 1955, he gave the rights to his patent to Ohio Northern College. The patent never was exploited for unknown reasons.

He had 3 patents while at Southport. He had a patent for "Dehydration of Molasses", dated March 1, 1955, also "Synthetic Bitumen Compositions", dated February 5, 1957, and "Bituminous Emulsions and the process for making them", dated April 16, 1957.

In July 1962, he lived in Miami, Florida, and wrote an article in the Professional Engineering Magazine about his invention of "Plasmofalt" as a stabilizing agent in adobe construction. On June 21, 1963, he wrote a letter to Dr. Bainbridge Bunting, Associate Professor of Art & Architecture at the University of New Mexico about how he got the idea to invent "Plasmofalt". He was thanking him for building the first house ever built from "Plasmofalt" stabilized brick. At that time, he was still the Director of the Tropical Agricultural Research Laboratory, Inc. now of Miami, Florida.

In this letter, he credited his early art lessons for helping him view things in different ways. When on a trip to South America, he observed workers dumping molasses into the sea as waste. The waste molasses consumed the oxygen in the sea and killed many fish. He thought of his art instructors approach that there is good in all things and came up with his invention of "Plasmofalt."

He was a member of the First Humanist Society of New York. Rappleyea died in Miami on August 29, 1966, at the age of 72. He was buried at Arlington National Cemetery in Washington, D.C.
