= Milburn White =

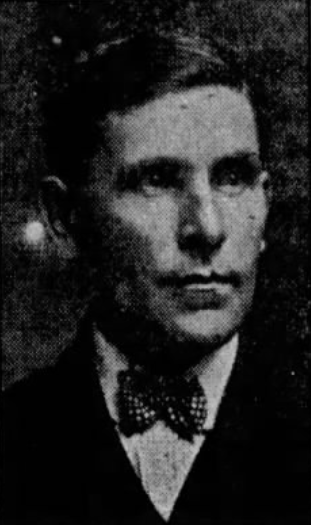

Member of the Tennessee House of Representatives from the 10th district
- In office 1915–1919

Personal details
- Born: 1878 Meigs County, Tennessee, U.S.
- Died: February 27, 1944 (aged 65–66) Louisville, Tennessee, U.S.
- Party: Republican
- Spouse(s): Cora; Rowena Walker
- Children: 5
- Relatives: Walter White (brother)
- Education: Chattanooga Normal University; American Temperance University

Milburn R. White (1878 – February 27, 1944) was an American educator politician who served in the Tennessee House of Representatives from 1915 to 1919, as a member of the Republican Party. His brother, Walter White, also served in the state legislature.

== Early life ==
Milburn R. White was born in Meigs County, Tennessee, in 1878, to John White and Susan Couch. He graduated from Pin Hook High School in 1903, and attended Chattanooga Normal University and American Temperance University. He was a teacher in Rhea County for twenty-five years and worked for the Rhea County News. He married Cora, with whom he had no children, and Rowena Walker, with whom he had five children. His brother, Walter White, also served in the Tennessee General Assembly.

== Tennessee House of Representatives ==
White served in the Tennessee House of Representatives from the 10th district, which his brother also held, from 1915 to 1919. William Hilleary unsuccessfully challenged him for the Republican nomination during the 1916 election. During his tenure he passed legislation creating Dayton, Tennessee's system of local government.

== Death ==
White died in Louisville, Tennessee, on February 27, 1944.

== Works cited ==
- Cornwell, Ilene (1988). Biographical Directory of the Tennessee General Assembly Volume III: 1901-1931. Tennessee Historical Commission. ISBN 0874020085.
