= Rhea Springs, Tennessee =

Community once located along the Piney River in Rhea County, Tennessee

Coordinates: 35.680°N 84.827°W

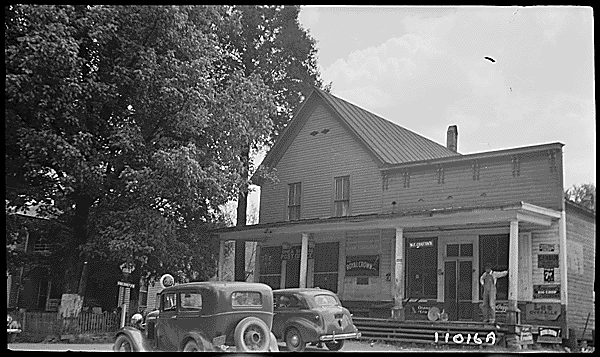
Store and post office in Rhea Springs, photographed in 1940

Rhea Springs was a community once located along the Piney River in Rhea County, Tennessee, in the southeastern United States. Originally established in the 19th century as a health resort, the community was inundated when the completion of Watts Bar Dam by the Tennessee Valley Authority flooded the lower Piney Valley in 1942.

Rhea Springs, known as "Sulphur Springs" before 1878, developed around a spring rumored to have "healing" qualities. The spring flowed into the banks of the Piney approximately 4 miles (6.4 km) upstream from the river's mouth along the Tennessee River. When the Tennessee Valley Authority began surveying the area for the construction of Watts Bar Dam and reservoir in the late 1930s, they reported a large hotel and seventeen small houses at Rhea Springs. After TVA acquired the community, most of its residents relocated elsewhere in the county or to Chattanooga.

Rhea Springs was the home of Congressman John R. Neal (1836–1889) and the birthplace of his son, Scopes Trial attorney John Randolph Neal, Jr. (1876–1959).

== See also ==
- Austins Mill, Tennessee
- Loyston, Tennessee
