= Loyston, Tennessee =

Loyston, Tennessee Loy's Crossroads
- Ghost town
- Loyston
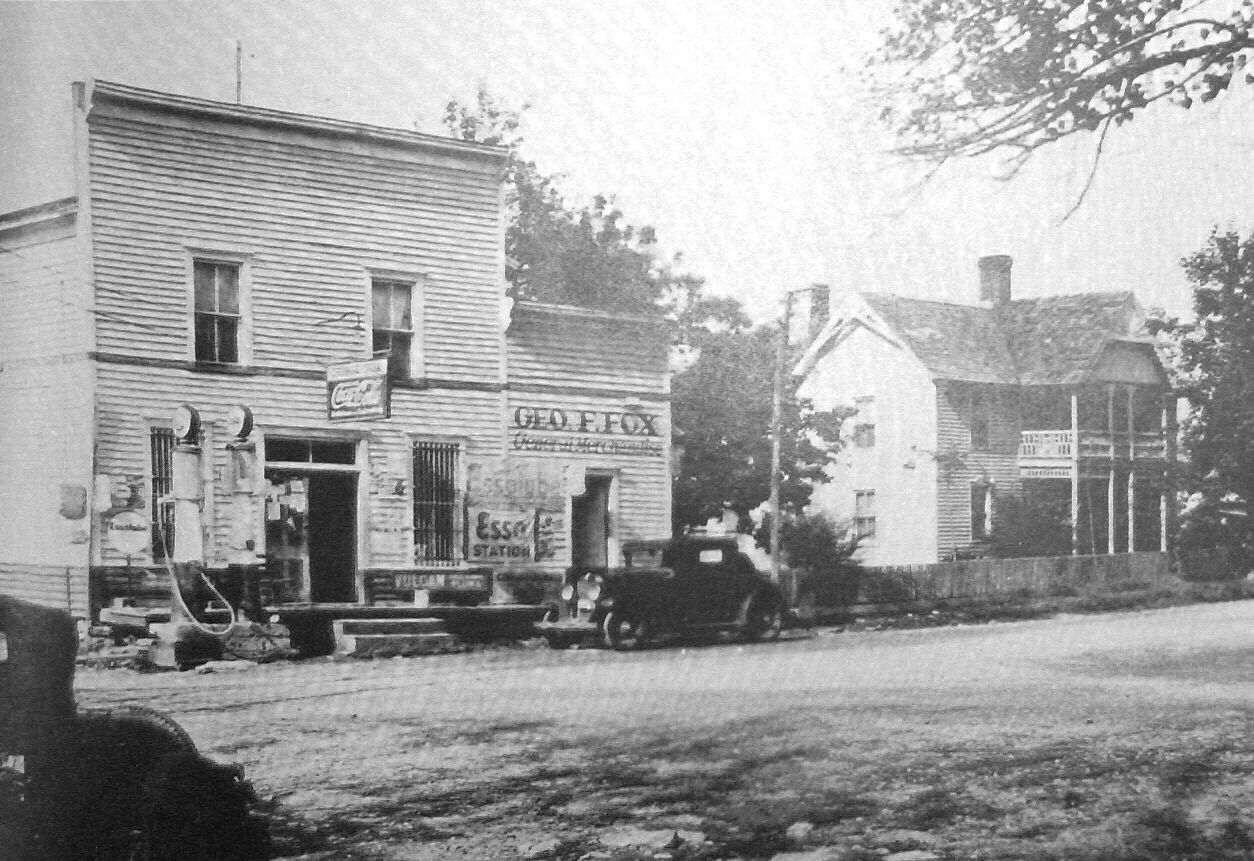
- Filling station in Loyston, 1933

- Location within Tennessee
- Coordinates: 36°15′55″N 83°57′00″W
- Country: United States
- State: Tennessee
- County: Union
- Settled: 1800s
- Impounded: 1935
- Founder: Stooksbury Family
- Named for: John Loy
- Elevation: 1,152 ft (351 m)

Population (1935)
  - Total: 70
- Time zone: UTC-5 (Eastern (EST))
  - Summer (DST): UTC-4 (EDT)
- GNIS feature ID: 1315598

Loyston is a ghost town in Union County, Tennessee, United States, that was inundated by the waters of the Clinch River after the completion of Norris Dam in 1936. Established in the early 19th century around a foundry built by its namesake, John Loy, over subsequent decades the community's location along State Highway 61 helped it grow into a trading center for local farmers. By the time the Tennessee Valley Authority (TVA) began making plans to build Norris Dam in the early 1930s, Loyston had a population of approximately 70 residents, and consisted of a post office and several small businesses.

Prior to inundation, TVA conducted extensive sociological surveys of Loyston's residents, and the community was documented by photographer Lewis Hine. Most Loyston residents, forced out by eminent domain, relocated elsewhere in the area, with many forming the community of New Loyston in the hills to the south. Loyston was located near where Mill Creek empties into the Clinch River, at river mile 98. Mill Creek's drainage carved a broad valley known as Big Valley, flanked on the south by Lone Mountain and on the east by Big Ridge. At Loyston, State Highway 61 intersected a major local road. The trip to Knoxville from Loyston was a 30-mile (48 km) drive on Highway 61 (which has since been re-routed).

Loyston is now under a mile-wide section of Norris Lake known as the "Loyston Sea," located along the shores of Big Ridge State Park.

== History ==
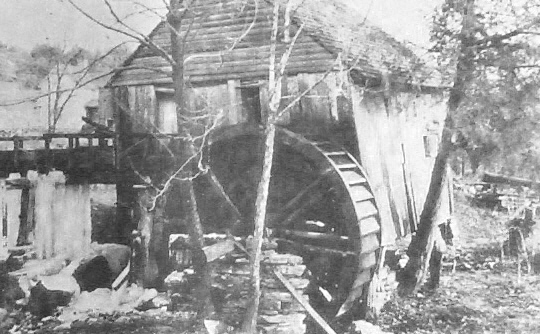
Francis Stooksbury gristmill in Loyston, photographed in 1933

In the 1780s, German immigrant Henry Sharp built a frontier fort known as "Sharp's Station", now known as Sharps Chapel, on the slopes of Big Ridge overlooking the Clinch River east of Loyston, the area having been identified by long hunters travelling down the Clinch Valley during the previous decade. In 1933, Sharp's descendants were still prominent members of the Loyston community, evidenced by names such as "Sharp's Station Methodist Episcopal Church," which was located just outside Loyston. Another notable early settler, Robert Stooksbury, moved to the Loyston area around 1800. Several dozen of Stooksbury's descendants were still living in the Loyston area in the early 1930s, some of whom operated one of the community's general stores.

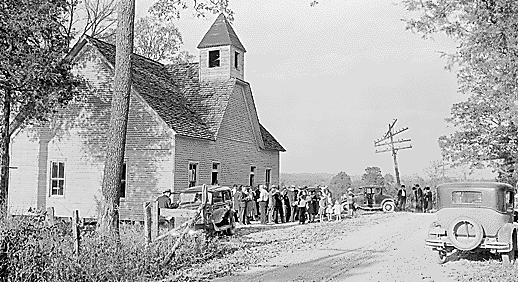
Sharp's Station Methodist Episcopal Church in Loyston, photographed by Lewis Hine in 1933

In the early 19th century, John Loy established a foundry in the area, taking advantage of the iron ore deposits at the base of Big Ridge. The community that developed around the foundry was known variously as "Loy" and "Loy's Crossroads." When a post office was established in the community in 1866, it took the name "Loy's Cross Roads," but the name was changed to Loyston in 1894.

By the early 1930s, when TVA agents were surveying the Clinch River Valley for the Norris Dam Project, Loyston consisted of a post office, two general stores, a filling station, a cafe, a mill, and a barbershop. A Delco Light system provided electricity to Loyston's businesses and a few of its houses. TVA and the University of Tennessee Department of Agriculture's extension service helped Loyston families relocate, driving them to farms for sale around the region (one Loyston family required 25 such trips before finding a farm that satisfied them). CCC Company 4495, which built Big Ridge State Park, was headquartered at Loyston.

== Tennessee Valley Authority ==
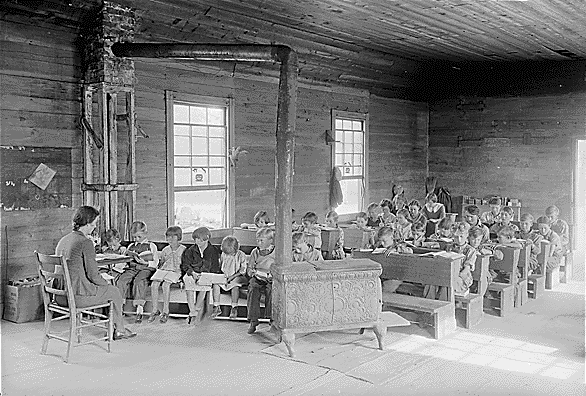
Oakdale School near Loyston, photographed by Lewis Hine in 1933

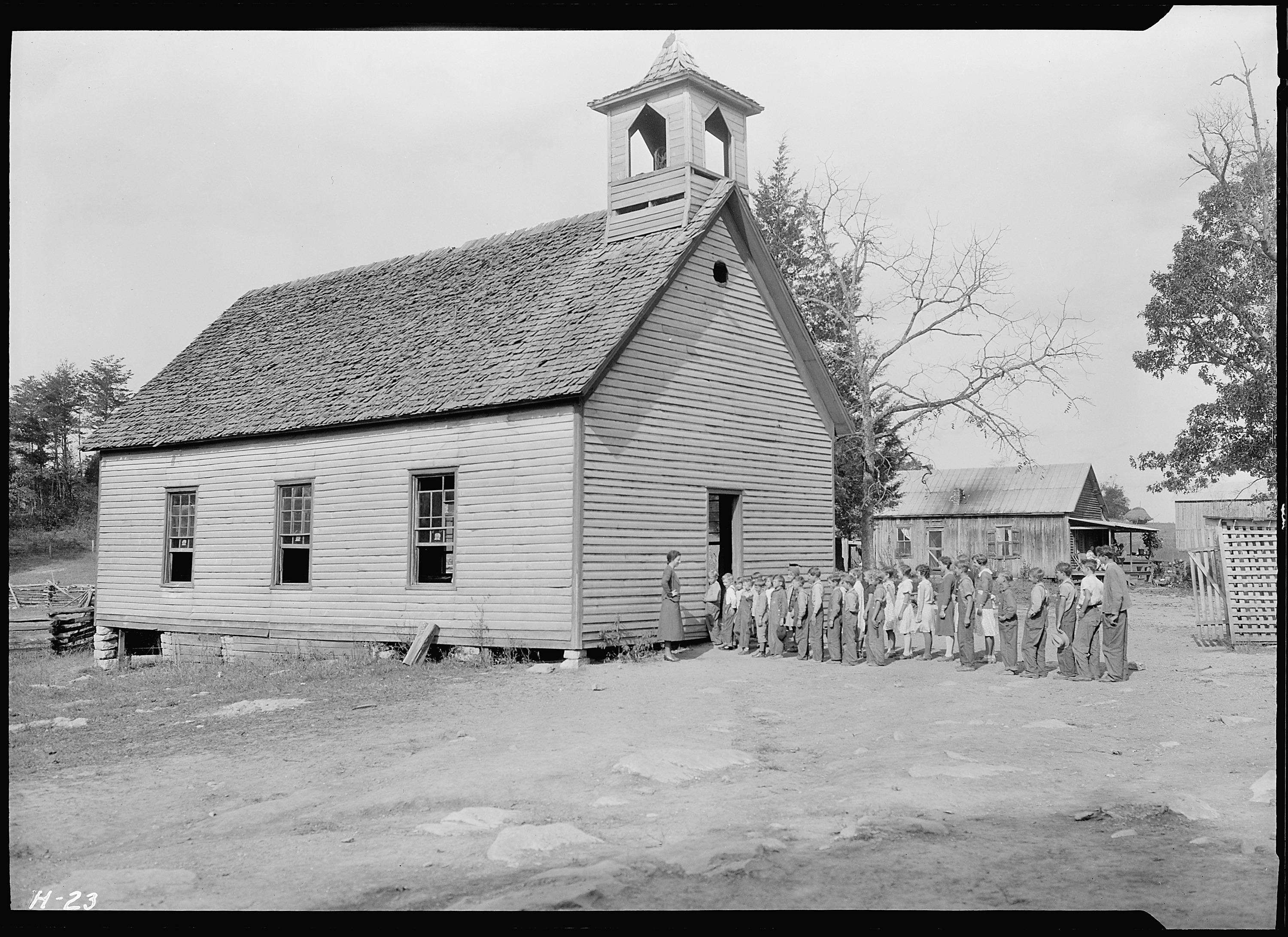
Oakdale School, 1933

TVA's studies showed that most residents of the Norris Basin were living in relative poverty, although Loyston's residents fared better due to better farm land. The Stooksbury general store had sales of $50,000 per year, resulting in a $7,000 profit. Houses in the Loyston area ranged from primitive two-room log cabins to eight-room frame houses. Most houses were heated by fireplaces, although some had coal-burning stoves. Loyston's children attended either Loyston Elementary School or the nearby one-room Oakdale School.

TVA agents discussed in depth with Loyston's residents the benefits of moving to more fertile lands in the lower parts of the valley, and were perplexed when most of the community's residents chose to move no further than the less lucrative adjacent hill country. In an attempt to keep the community intact, many of the displaced residents established New Loyston a few miles to the south. A significant number moved to Knoxville, and others moved to nearby Anderson County or to Blount or Loudon counties south of Knoxville.

== Legacy ==
The valley in which Loyston was once located is now submerged under the widest part of Norris Lake, the mile-wide "Loyston Sea." While building the Norris reservoir, TVA engineers determined that a saddle dam would be necessary to prevent water from the Mill Creek embayment from escaping into the Buffalo Creek Valley (which empties into the Clinch downstream from Norris Dam). This saddle dam, known as the "Loyston Dike," is located along Highway 61 just west of Big Ridge State Park. A recreation area along the Mill Creek embayment has also been named for Loyston. In 2008, the Museum of Appalachia accepted a donation of a children's playhouse that originally stood in Loyston and was said to be the last intact building from the community.

== See also ==
- Austins Mill, Tennessee
- Rhea Springs, Tennessee
