= John R. Neal =

American politician (1836–1889)

John Randolph Neal
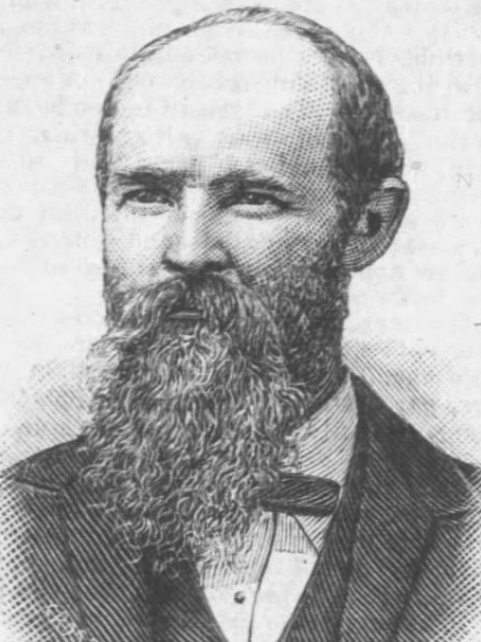
- From the October 5, 1884 edition of The Chattanooga Sunday Times

Member of the U.S. House of Representatives from Tennessee's 3rd district
- In office March 4, 1885 – March 3, 1889
- Preceded by: George Gibbs Dibrell
- Succeeded by: Henry Clay Evans

Speaker of the Tennessee Senate
- In office 1879–1881

Member of the Tennessee House of Representatives
- In office 1875–1877

Personal details
- Born: November 26, 1836 Anderson County, Tennessee, U.S.
- Died: March 26, 1889 (aged 52) Rhea Springs, Tennessee, U.S.
- Citizenship: United States
- Party: Democratic
- Spouse: Mary E. C. Brown Neal
- Children: Dr. John Randolph Neal Jr.; Commander George F. Neal; Amanda Neal Wheelock
- Education: Hiwassee College, Emory and Henry College
- Profession: Teacher, attorney

Military service
- Allegiance: Confederate States of America
- Branch/service: Confederate States Army
- Rank: captain; lieutenant colonel
- Unit: 16th Battalion, Tennessee Cavalry
- Battles/wars: American Civil War

John Randolph Neal (November 26, 1836 – March 26, 1889) was an American politician and a member of the United States House of Representatives for Tennessee's 3rd congressional district.

== Biography ==
Neal was born near Clinton, Tennessee in Anderson County son of John O'Brien and Permelia Young Neal. He attended the common schools and Hiwassee College in Monroe County, Tennessee. He graduated from Emory and Henry College in Emory, Virginia in 1858. He taught school at Post Oak Springs and studied law; was admitted to the bar in 1859, and commenced practice in Athens, Tennessee. At the beginning of the war, he married Mary E. C. Brown, daughter of Franklin Brown. They had three children; Dr. John R. Neal, Jr., Professor of Law at the University of Tennessee, and Scopes Trial attorney; Commander George F. Neal, U. S. N. and D. S. O. from King George V for distinguished service during World War I for sinking a German submarine, and Navy Cross from Congress for loyal service; and Amanda Neal Wheelock.

== Career ==
During the Civil War, Neal enlisted in the Confederate Army and was elected captain of a Cavalry troop, which afterward became a part of the 16th Battalion, Tennessee Cavalry. He was subsequently promoted to lieutenant colonel of the battalion. He taught school for several years, settled at Rhea Springs, Tennessee, and continued the practice of law. He was elected as a member of the Tennessee House of Representatives in 1874, serving from 1875 to 1877. He was subsequently elected to the Tennessee Senate in 1878, serving as its presiding officer from 1879 to 1881.

Neal was elected as a Democrat to the Forty-ninth and Fiftieth Congresses. He served from March 4, 1885, to March 3, 1889, but declined to be a candidate for renomination in 1888 on account of ill health.

== Death ==
Neal died at Rhea Springs, Tennessee, in Rhea County on March 26, 1889 (age 52 years, 120 days). He is interred at the W.F. Brown family cemetery in Post Oak Springs, Roane County, Tennessee.

U.S. House of Representatives
Preceded by George G. Dibrell	Member of the U.S. House of Representatives from Tennessee's 3rd congressional district 1885–1889	Succeeded by Henry C. Evans
