= 1924 Tennessee gubernatorial election =

- November 4, 1924
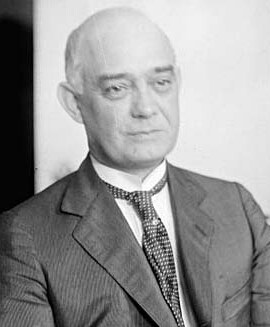

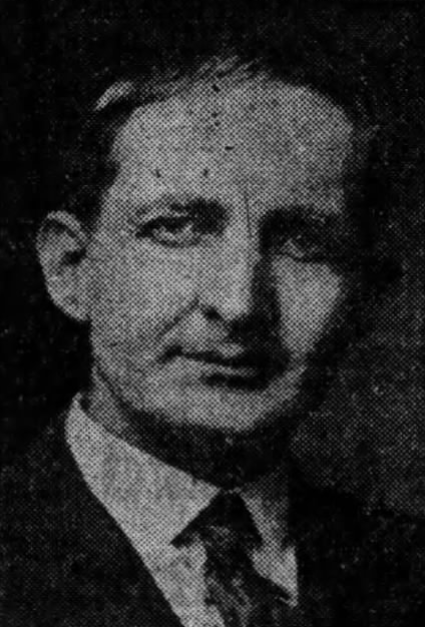
Nominee	Austin Peay	T. F. Peck
Party	Democratic	Republican
Popular vote	162,002	121,228
Percentage	57.20%	42.80%
- County results Peay: 50–60% 60–70% 70–80% 80–90% >90% Peck: 50–60% 60–70% 70–80% 80–90% >90%
Governor before election
Austin Peay
Democratic
Elected Governor
Austin Peay
Democratic

The 1924 Tennessee gubernatorial election was held on November 4, 1924. Incumbent Democratic governor Austin Peay defeated Republican nominee T. F. Peck with 57.2% of the vote.

== Primary elections ==
Primary elections were held on August 7, 1924.

=== Democratic primary ===
==== Candidates ====
- Austin Peay, incumbent governor
- John Randolph Neal Jr., attorney

==== Results ====
Democratic primary results
Party	Candidate	Votes	%
Democratic	Austin Peay (incumbent)	125,031	79.02%
Democratic	John Randolph Neal Jr.	33,199	20.98%
Total votes		158,230	100.00%

== General election ==
=== Candidates ===
- Austin Peay, Democratic
- T. F. Peck, Republican

=== Results ===
1924 Tennessee gubernatorial election
Party	Candidate	Votes	%	±%
Democratic	Austin Peay (incumbent)	162,002	57.20%	
Republican	T. F. Peck	121,228	42.80%	
Majority		40,774		
Turnout				
Democratic hold		Swing		

== See also ==
- 1924 United States presidential election in Tennessee
- 1924 United States Senate election in Tennessee
