= Federal-aid highway program =

US federally-funded road system

The U.S. federal-aid highway program was commenced in 1916, with milestones of Federal-Aid Highway Act of 1944 and Federal-Aid Highway Act of 1956.

Before the Interstate Highway System was established in 1956, the federal-aid highway system consisted of three parts:

- The Interstate Highway System (FAI routes)
- The Federal-aid primary highway system (FAP system) is a system of connected main highways, selected by each state highway department subject to the approval of the Bureau of Public Roads. It encompasses routes of the Interstate System and other important routes serving essentially through traffic with their urban extensions, including important loops, belt highways, and spurs.
- The Federal-aid secondary highway system (FAS system) consists of the principal secondary and feeder routes, including farm-to-market roads, rural mail and public school bus routes, local rural roads, county and township roads, roads of the county, road class, and their urban extensions. These roads are chosen by the state highway departments and appropriate local road officials cooperatively, subject to approval by the Bureau of Public Roads.

In modern times, the Federal-Aid Highway Program supports state highway systems by providing financial assistance for the construction, maintenance, and operations of the 3.9-million-mile (6,300,000 km) highway network, including the Interstate Highway System, primary highways, and secondary local roads.
