= 1922 Tennessee gubernatorial election =

- November 7, 1922
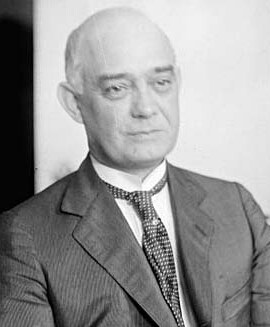

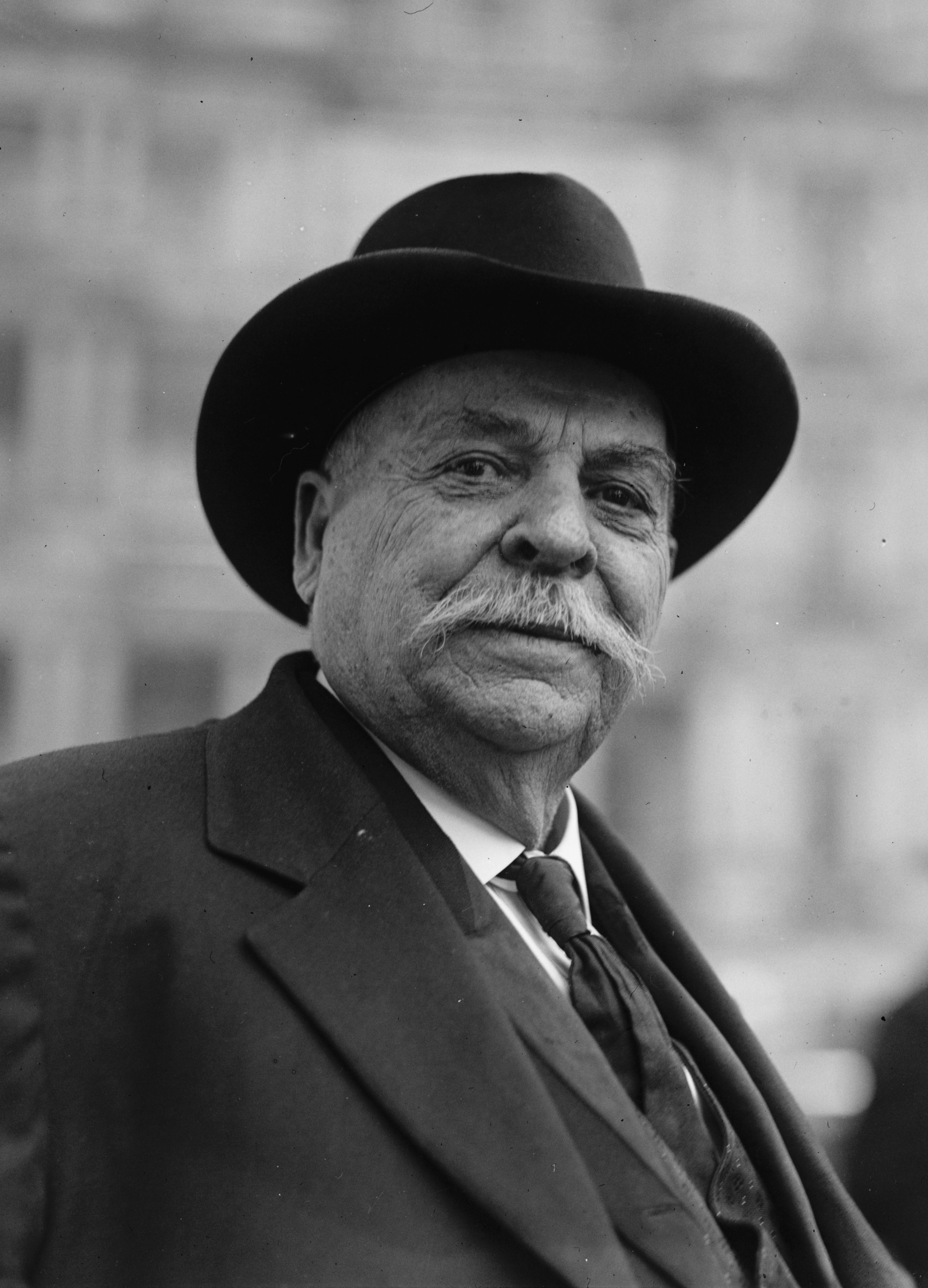
| Nominee | Austin Peay | Alfred A. Taylor |
| Party | Democratic | Republican |
| Popular vote | 141,012 | 102,586 |
| Percentage | 57.89% | 42.11% |
- County results Peay: 50–60% 60–70% 70–80% 80–90% >90% Taylor: 50–60% 60–70% 70–80% 80–90% >90%
Governor before election
Alfred A. Taylor
Republican
Elected Governor
Austin Peay
Democratic

The 1922 Tennessee gubernatorial election was held on November 7, 1922. Democratic nominee Austin Peay defeated incumbent Republican governor Alfred A. Taylor with 57.9% of the vote.

Peay narrowly won the Democratic primary against Benton McMillin, defeating him by a little over 2%. With this win, Peay flipped the state back into Democratic control, with the state legislature also being controlled by Democrats. This is the last time that an incumbent governor of Tennessee lost reelection.

== Primary elections ==
Primary elections were held on August 3, 1922.

=== Democratic primary ===
==== Candidates ====
- Austin Peay, former state representative
- Benton McMillin, former governor
- Harvey H. Hannah
- L. E. Gwinn

==== Results ====
Democratic primary results
| Party | Candidate | Votes | % |
|---|---|---|---|
| Democratic | Austin Peay | 63,940 | 39.21 |
| Democratic | Benton McMillin | 59,922 | 36.75 |
| Democratic | Harvey H. Hannah | 24,062 | 14.76 |
| Democratic | L. E. Gwinn | 15,137 | 9.28 |
| Total votes | | 163,061 | 100.00 |

== General election ==
=== Candidates ===
- Austin Peay, Democratic
- Alfred A. Taylor, Republican

=== Results ===
1922 Tennessee gubernatorial election
| Party | Candidate | Votes | % | ±% |
|---|---|---|---|---|
| Democratic | Austin Peay | 141,012 | 57.89% | |
| Republican | Alfred A. Taylor (incumbent) | 102,586 | 42.11% | |
| Majority | | 38,426 | | |
| Turnout | | | | |
| Democratic gain from Republican | | Swing | | |

== See also ==
- 1922 United States Senate election in Tennessee
