= John T. Scopes =

American schoolteacher and Scopes Trial figure (1900–1970)

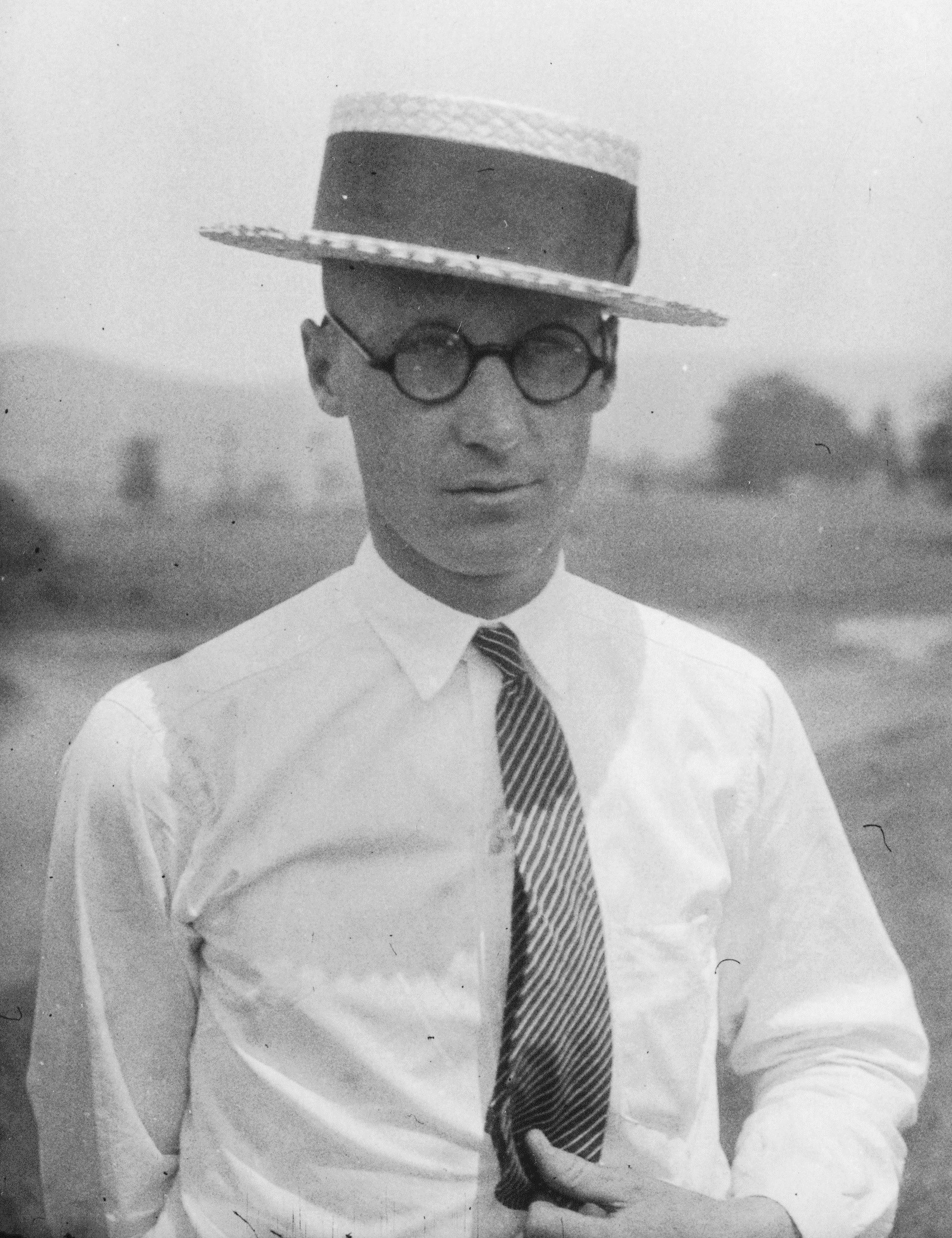
- Scopes in 1925
- Born: John Thomas Scopes; August 3, 1900; Paducah, Kentucky, U.S.
- Died: October 21, 1970 (aged 70); Shreveport, Louisiana, U.S.
- Education: University of Kentucky, University of Chicago
- Occupations: Teacher; Football coach; Geologist
- Known for: Scopes monkey trial
- Spouse: Mildred E. Walker
- Children: 2

John Thomas Scopes (August 3, 1900 – October 21, 1970) was an American teacher in Dayton, Tennessee, who was charged on May 5, 1925, with violating Tennessee's Butler Act, which prohibited the teaching of human evolution in Tennessee schools. He was tried in a case known as the Scopes trial and was found guilty and fined $100 (equivalent to $1,836 in 2025).

== Early life ==
Scopes was born in 1900 to Thomas Scopes and Mary Alva Brown, who lived on a farm in Paducah, Kentucky. John was their fifth child and only son. The family relocated to Danville, Illinois, when he was a teenager. In 1917, he relocated to Salem, Illinois, where he was a member of the class of 1919 at Salem Community High School.

He attended the University of Illinois briefly, then quit for health reasons. He earned a degree at the University of Kentucky in 1924, with a major in law and a minor in geology.

Scopes relocated to Dayton, Tennessee, where he became the Rhea County High School football coach, and occasionally served as a substitute teacher.

== Trial ==
Scopes's involvement with the Scopes trial occurred after the American Civil Liberties Union (ACLU) announced that it would finance a test case challenging the constitutionality of the Butler Act if it could find a Tennessee teacher who was willing to act as a defendant.

A group of businessmen in Dayton, Tennessee, especially engineer and geologist George Rappleyea, considered this an opportunity to get publicity for their town, and Rappleyea spoke with Scopes, stating that while the Butler Act prohibited the teaching of human evolution, the state required teachers to use the assigned textbook, George William Hunter's Civic Biology (1914), which included a chapter concerning evolution. Rappleyea argued that teachers were thus essentially required to violate the law. When asked about a test case, Scopes was initially reluctant to get involved. After some discussion he told the group gathered in Robinson's Drugstore, "If you can prove that I've taught evolution and that I can qualify as a defendant, then I'll be willing to stand trial".

By the time the trial had begun, the defense team included Clarence Darrow, Dudley Field Malone, John Neal, Arthur Garfield Hays and Frank McElwee. The prosecution team, directed by politician Tom Stewart, included brothers Herbert Hicks and Sue K. Hicks, Wallace Haggard, father and son pairings Ben and J. Gordon McKenzie, and William Jennings Bryan and William Jennings Bryan Jr. The elder Bryan had spoken at Scopes's high school commencement, and remembered the defendant was laughing while he was giving the address to the graduating class six years earlier.

The case ended on July 21, 1925, with a verdict of guilty, and Scopes was fined $100 (equivalent to $1,836 in 2025). The case was appealed to the Tennessee Supreme Court. In a 3–1 decision written by Chief Justice Grafton Green, the Butler Act was held to be constitutional, but the court overturned Scopes's conviction because the judge had set the fine instead of the jury. The Butler Act remained in effect until May 18, 1967, when it was repealed by the Tennessee legislature.

Scopes may have been innocent of the crime with which his name is associated. After the trial, he admitted to reporter William Kinsey Hutchinson "I didn't violate the law," explaining that he had skipped the evolution lesson and that his lawyers had coached his students to testify; the Dayton businessmen had assumed that he had violated the law. Hutchinson did not file his story until after the Scopes appeal was decided in 1927.

In 1955, the trial was fictionalized as a play titled Inherit the Wind featuring Paul Muni as a character based on Clarence Darrow and Ed Begley as a character based on William Jennings Bryan. In 1960, a movie version of the play featured Spencer Tracy as the Darrow character and Fredric March as the Bryan character.

Both the play and the movie change the facts substantially. For example, the character of Bertram Cates is shown being arrested in class, put in jail, burned in effigy by frenzied, mean-spirited, and ignorant townspeople, and taunted by a preacher. The character of Matthew Harrison Brady, an almost comical fanatic, dramatically dies of a "busted belly" while attempting to deliver his summation in a chaotic courtroom. None of these incidents happened in Dayton, Tennessee during the trial.

== Life after the trial ==
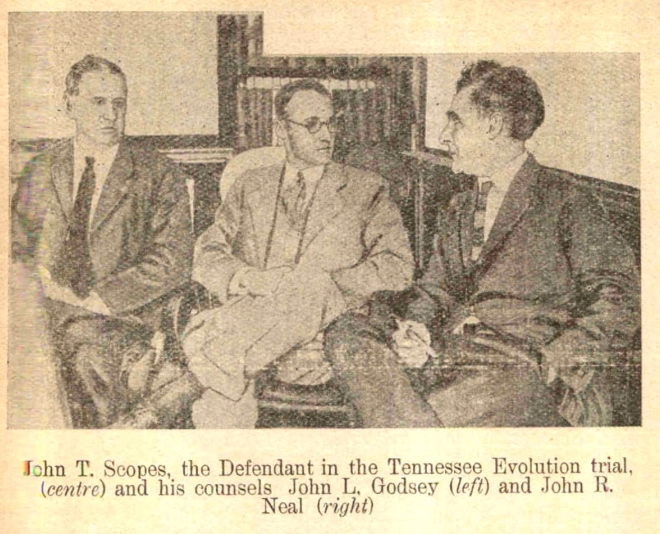
c. 1925.

The results of the Scopes Trial affected Scopes professionally and personally. His public image was mocked by animation, cartoons, and other media during the succeeding years. Scopes himself largely shunned publicity.

During September 1925, he enrolled in the graduate school of the University of Chicago to finish his studies of geology (where he earned a master's degree). Evidence of harassment by the press was mentioned by Frank Thorne: "You may be interested to know that Mr. John T. Scopes of anti-evolution trial fame expects to take up the study of geology as a graduate student of Chicago this fall…Please do what you can to protect him from the importunities of Chicago reporters….He is a modest and unassuming young chap, and has been subjected to a great deal more limelight than he likes." A year later, the Tennessee Supreme Court decision of 1926 prompted the press to pursue Scopes again. During this time, he wrote to Thorne, "I am tired of fooling with them". It is evident that the media's attention was affecting Scopes emotionally.

After his graduation, he was "barred" from career opportunities in Tennessee. He took a job as a field engineer with Gulf Oil in Venezuela.

Having failed in education, Scopes attempted to build a political career and he began an unsuccessful bid as a candidate of the Socialist Party for the U.S. House of Representatives for Kentucky's only at-large congressional campaign, during 1932. Eventually Scopes worked as an oil expert for the United Production Corporation, later known as the United Gas Corporation. There, he first worked in Beeville, Texas, then, he worked in the company's Houston office until 1940, and later, he worked in Shreveport, Louisiana, where he stayed until his death. United Gas merged into what was Pennzoil during 1968.

Scopes attended the 1960 premiere of Inherit the Wind and he also participated in the celebration of John T. Scopes Day.

Scopes and the story of his trial were featured in an episode of the television game show To Tell The Truth on October 10, 1960.

In June 1967, Scopes published Center of the Storm: Memoirs of John T. Scopes. The Butler Act was repealed that same year.

== Personal life and death ==
In February 1930, while working in Maracaibo, Venezuela, Scopes married Mildred Elizabeth Walker (1905−1990). Together they had two sons.

Scopes died of cancer on October 21, 1970, in Shreveport, Louisiana at the age of 70.

== See also ==
- Mildred Seydell
