= Sue K. Hicks =

American judge

Sue Kerr Hicks
- Sue Hicks
- Born: December 12, 1895; Madisonville, Tennessee
- Died: June 17, 1980 (aged 84); Sweetwater, Tennessee
- Education: Hiwassee College, University of Kentucky
- Occupations: Lawyer & Judge

Sue Kerr Hicks (December 12, 1895 – June 17, 1980) was an American jurist who practiced law and served as a circuit court judge in the state of Tennessee. He is best known for his role as a co-instigator and prosecutor in the 1925 trial of John T. Scopes, a Dayton, Tennessee, teacher accused of teaching the Theory of Evolution in violation of Tennessee state law. Hicks may have also been the inspiration for the Shel Silverstein song "A Boy Named Sue", which was popularized by Johnny Cash in 1969.

== Life and legal career ==
Hicks was born in Madisonville, Tennessee, on December 12, 1895. He was the youngest child of Charles Wesley and Susanna Coltharp Hicks. Hicks was named "Sue" after his mother, who died shortly after giving birth to him. Charles Wesley Hicks, Sue's father, was a prominent Madisonville lawyer, and Wesley J. Hicks, Sue's great-uncle, was the author of a manual on Tennessee Chancery law practice and played a key role in getting lawsuits dismissed against former Confederate officers in the Knoxville area after the American Civil War. Hicks trained at Hiwassee College and the University of Kentucky before joining his older brother, Herbert, in Dayton, where Herbert had been appointed acting Rhea County attorney.

In Dayton, the Hicks brothers were regulars at the F.E. Robinson Drugstore, where the town's professionals often gathered to socialize and discuss issues of the day. In May 1925, the Hicks brothers and other regulars became involved in a discussion over an American Civil Liberties Union advertisement seeking a challenge to the Butler Act, a recently enacted state law barring the teaching of the Theory of Evolution. Realizing the publicity such a case would bring to Rhea County, the group – who would eventually become known as the "drugstore conspirators" – decided to engineer a case that would test the constitutionality of the Butler Act. The group recruited local football coach and substitute teacher John T. Scopes – a friend of Sue's – to admit to teaching the Theory of Evolution. One of the conspirators, George Rappleyea, swore out a warrant for Scopes' arrest on May 5, and charges were filed the following day.

Sue Hicks served as a member of the Scopes Trial prosecution team, although his role was overshadowed by the presence of William Jennings Bryan, an activist and former presidential candidate who had been invited to join the team as a special prosecutor. While the trial was successful in bringing publicity to Rhea County, much of the publicity was negative, and portrayed local residents as backward and uneducated. Although Scopes was convicted – as had been planned – the "test case" came to an end in 1927, when the Tennessee Supreme Court ruled the Butler Act constitutional, but overturned Scopes' conviction on a technicality. This kept the case out of the federal court system and ended any chance of it proceeding to the United States Supreme Court, which the drugstore conspirators had originally hoped. Hicks later wrote the following about his views on the trial:

We cannot speak other than with commendation as to the conduct of Judge Raulston in the Scopes Case. It was a very trying case. Religious fanatics, reds, and all manner of rabble were assembled at this trial, and at times the excitement of the crowd became almost a frenzy, and almost beyond the control of the small number of officers which we had at our disposal. Beside the attorneys for the defense did every thing they could to provoke the Court and to get on the front pages of the newspapers as much as they could, so the situation was very hard to handle.

Between 1936 and 1958, Hicks served as a state circuit court judge, and continued to serve in a reserve status until the 1970s. He presided over more than 800 murder cases, and gained a reputation for being "fair" and "tough". In the mid-1960s, Hicks served as president of the Fort Loudoun Association, and led the early opposition to the Tennessee Valley Authority's plans to build Tellico Dam at the mouth of the Little Tennessee River. Hicks died on June 27, 1980, in Sweetwater, Tennessee. He is buried at Haven Hill Memorial Gardens in Madisonville. The Sue K. Hicks Papers, which consist primarily of Hicks's correspondence regarding the Scopes Trial and later legal cases, are on file at the University of Tennessee Special Collections Library in Knoxville.

== Inspiration for "A Boy Named Sue" ==
Hicks's oddly feminine first name may have inspired the song, "A Boy Named Sue", which Johnny Cash first performed in 1969. The song's author, Shel Silverstein, attended a judicial conference in Gatlinburg, Tennessee – at which Hicks was a speaker – and apparently got the idea for the song title after hearing Hicks introduced. While Cash said he was unaware that Silverstein had any one person in mind when he wrote the song, he did send Hicks two records and two autographed pictures with the inscription, "To Sue, how do you do?"

While his name may have inspired the song's title, Hicks pointed out that the character in the song's lyrics – who seeks revenge against his father after a lifetime of teasing – bore little resemblance to his own life. Hicks's father named him after his deceased mother, who had died from complications with Hicks's birth, rather than, as the song suggests, to make him "strong". Hicks also claimed to have always had a sense of humor about his name, and did not consider it a source of derision. In 1970, Hicks noted: "It is an irony of fate that I have tried over 800 murder cases and thousands of others, but the most publicity has been from the name 'Sue' and from the evolution trial. ... I was named Sue for my mother, who died after childbirth."

== See also ==
- Ray Jenkins
- John Randolph Neal Jr.
