= Herbert Hicks =

American politician

Herbert S. Hicks (born 1872) was an American lawyer and state legislator in Illinois. He was a Republican and served in the Illinois House of Representatives and Illinois Senate.

He was born in Rockford, Illinois. He graduated from Illinois State Normal University and Stanford University.

He was elected to the Illinois House before being elected to the Illinois Senate in 1920 and 1924. He proposed legislation for the purchase of property for a state park in Ogle County. He served on the prosecution team for the Scopes Trial.
