= John Randolph Neal Jr. =

American lawyer (1876–1959)

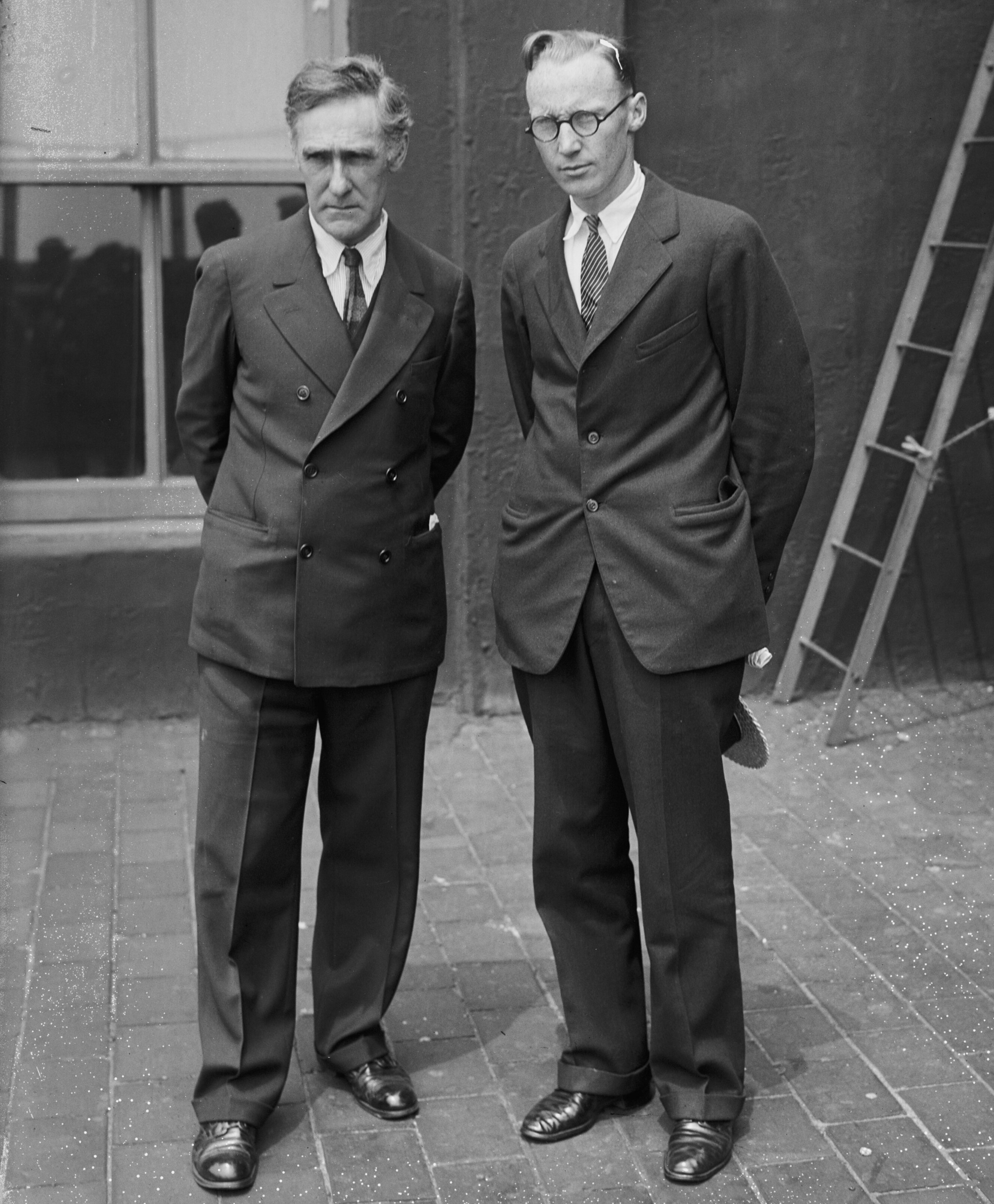
- Neal (left) with John T. Scopes
- Born: John O'Brien Neal; September 17, 1876; Rhea Springs, Tennessee, United States
- Died: November 23, 1959 (aged 83); Rockwood, Tennessee, US
- Resting place: 35.87563°N 84.62715°W
- Education: University of Tennessee, A.B. Vanderbilt University, LL.B. Columbia University, Ph.D.
- Occupations: Attorney, professor, politician
- Political party: Democratic
- Parent(s): John R. Neal and Mary Elizabeth Brown

John Randolph Neal Jr. (September 17, 1876 – November 23, 1959) was an American attorney, law professor, politician, and activist, best known for his role as chief counsel during the 1925 Scopes Trial, and as an advocate for the establishment of the Tennessee Valley Authority in the 1920s and 1930s. He also taught law at the University of Denver and the University of Tennessee, and served in the Tennessee state legislature. He was a candidate for governor or senator numerous times between 1912 and 1954.

Known as "The Great Objector" for his uncomprising (and often unpopular) support of progressive causes, Neal was among the U.T. faculty members fired in 1923 by the school's administration in a controversy that became known as the "Slaughter of the Ph.Ds." He campaigned for civil liberties, public control of waterways, and workers' rights, and defended striking workers pro bono on several occasions.

Neal is often remembered for his eccentric personality and unconventional behavior, which included an almost total disregard for his own appearance.

== Early life ==
Neal was born John O'Brien Neal in Rhea Springs, Tennessee, the son of John Randolph Neal and Mary Elizabeth Brown Neal. His father had been an officer in the Confederate army during the Civil War, and served in the United States House of Representatives from 1885 to 1889, when he died. Following his death, his son took his name.

Neal was educated by private tutors. He received his A.B. from the University of Tennessee in 1893, and obtained his law degree from Vanderbilt in 1896. Neal graduated from Columbia University with a Ph.D. in history in 1899. His dissertation, entitled, "Disunion and Restoration in Tennessee," analyzed the state's post-Civil War period. In late 1899, Neal moved to Denver, where his sister lived, and accepted a position teaching law at the University of Denver.

== State legislature ==
In 1906, Neal ran successfully for the Tennessee House of Representatives for the district encompassing his native Rhea County and adjacent Meigs County. He continued lecturing at the University of Denver during months when the legislature was not in session, however, and thus lived in the district he represented for only part of the year, causing some agitation among his constituents. Neal spent his term in the House advocating legislation to better organize boards of education, acquiring consistent funding for schools, and implementing more rigid mine inspection standards.

In 1908, Neal was elected to the Tennessee State Senate, representing Rhea and surrounding counties. In early 1909, the senate attempted to pass a bill transferring the power to select county election officials from the governor to the legislature. Neal vehemently opposed this bill, and formed a committee in hopes of defeating it. When it became clear he lacked the votes, he and twelve other senators fled to Kentucky, preventing a quorum in the senate and stalling the vote on the bill. The bill's sponsors called a joint meeting of the General Assembly to sidestep senate procedural rules, however, and managed to get the bill passed.

By 1910, Neal had alienated the governor and had made numerous enemies within his own party, and both factions began calling for his ouster. He was defeated in the senate primary that year, and blamed his defeat on the "snap conventions" engineered by county election officials.

== "Slaughter of the Ph.Ds" ==
Neal joined the faculty of the University of Tennessee as a part-time lecturer in 1909, and became a full-time member of the faculty in 1917. His unconventional style, while popular with students, frustrated university administrators, especially the law school dean, Malcolm McDermott. Neal frequently failed to show up for class or grade examinations, and sometimes simply gave every student in the class a "95" regardless of their performance. He also had a habit of ignoring the prescribed lessons and instead gave rambling lectures on current events.

In 1923, a controversy known as the "Slaughter of the Ph.Ds" erupted when U.T. president Harcourt Morgan opted not to rehire seven professors, including Neal. One of the terminated professors, Jesse Sprowls, stated he was fired because he had refused Morgan's request that he not teach the Theory of Evolution, and Neal suspected he had been fired for coming to Sprowls's defense (historians suggest that while Morgan wasn't personally opposed to the theory, he was concerned that a state legislature hostile to the theory might cut the school's appropriations). The American Association of University Professors investigated the incident, but found no evidence that the firings were over the teaching of Evolution.

The firing of Neal caused outrage among College of Law alumni, who petitioned the board of trustees to reinstate him. Governor Austin Peay, a member of the board, expressed his concern, but reserved judgement until he had heard from both sides. He ordered an open meeting of the board to be held at the Farragut Hotel in downtown Knoxville.

At the meeting, Morgan spoke first, and accused Neal of frequently missing classes with no excuse, giving extremely easy exams which he often failed to monitor or even grade, never keeping record of attendance, and ignoring the smoking ban in Ayres Hall. In his response, Neal pointed out that his examination habits were hardly different from those of other professors, and denied he had missed more than a few classes (he also pointed out that McDermott was absent 25% of the time). Several former students spoke on Neal's behalf. In the end, the board voted 5–2 to uphold the terminations, with Peay as one of the dissenters.

Following the hearing, Neal convinced the legislature to open an investigation of U.T.'s administration. He stated that the board of trustees was illegally constituted (it lacked the requisite number of alumni), blasted President Morgan as "legally, morally, and mentally incompetent," and pointed out that the school was the only one in the country that had virtually no Ph.Ds among its president and deans. The investigation quickly fizzled.

== Scopes Trial ==
In 1925, Dayton teacher John T. Scopes was arrested for teaching the Theory of Evolution, in violation of the state's Butler Act. Neal immediately offered to defend Scopes, and would serve as chief counsel for the duration of the trial. Daytonians, many of whom hoped the high-profile trial would give the town an economic boost, initially welcomed Neal as the first notable figure to arrive, but he quickly alienated them when he asked for the trial to be moved to Chattanooga or Knoxville (his request was rejected).

As Neal organized his defense team, renowned defense lawyer Clarence Darrow offered Scopes and Neal his services. The American Civil Liberties Union (ACLU), which was interested in the case's constitutional aspects, advised Neal to decline the offer, fearing Darrow would turn the trial into a religious debate. Neal ignored the ACLU, however, and added Darrow to the defense team. He also added ACLU attorney Arthur Hays and former Secretary of State, Bainbridge Colby.

Upon Darrow's arrival in Dayton, he and Neal immediately began fighting over trial strategy, and each conspired to have the other removed from the defense team. Neal, still bitter over his dismissal from U.T., wanted to defend the rights of teachers, while Darrow wanted the trial to be an indictment of religious intolerance. Neal consistently stated that the trial was not about whether or not the Theory of Evolution was true, but instead involved "the freedom of teaching, or more important, the freedom of learning."

Following Scopes's conviction, the ACLU grew frustrated over Neal's handling of the case, especially after he missed the deadline to file a bill of exceptions to the Tennessee Supreme Court, which essentially meant they couldn't base their appeal on the state's handling of the case. While Neal's role was somewhat minimized, he nevertheless remained part of the defense team throughout the appeals process, and consistently sought to move the case into the federal court system.

== Tennessee Valley Authority ==
Throughout the 1920s, Neal was a persistent advocate for government control of the Tennessee River and its watershed. He stated that the nation's navigable waterways and the electricity they generated belonged to the people, and warned that private control of the river would give energy companies monopolistic power. Neal was present (often uninvited) at virtually every meeting on the river's future in the late 1920s, and was often the lone dissenter in favor of public control.

Neal took an active interest in the government's completion of Wilson Dam in Alabama in the early 1920s (one of the charges against him during the "Slaughter" incident was that he missed numerous classes while travelling to Muscle Shoals). In 1925, the U.S. Army Corps of Engineers surveyed the river, and held a meeting in December of that year to discuss allowing power companies to bid for dam sites. At the meeting, Neal warned that private control of the Upper Tennessee River would doom Wilson Dam. He continuously quizzed speaker after speaker, and eventually had to be silenced by Major Harold Fiske.

In January 1926, Senator George Norris, in response to a plea from Neal, convinced the Federal Power Commission to suspend further action regarding bids for dams on the Tennessee River, and introduced legislation that would turn development of the river over to the federal government. Though this bill failed, Neal continued campaigning against the power companies. He was the lone dissenter at an Athens, Tennessee, conference on the private development of the Hiwassee River in May 1927, and again at the Southern Appalachian Power Conference in October 1927. Reporting on Neal's presence at the latter, the Knoxville News-Sentinel wrote that he was "unqualified to vote, uninvited to attend."

By the early 1930s, sentiments had begun to shift, as many Tennesseans wanted the river developed, and didn't care whether or not it was developed by the government or private power companies. With the election of President Franklin D. Roosevelt, Norris's act was finally able to pass, creating the Tennessee Valley Authority. The News-Sentinel reported that Neal was "the individual most active in behalf of the Norris program." There was a movement to have Neal appointed to the TVA Board of Directors, but the appointment went to Harcourt Morgan.

Though he remained a supporter of TVA, Neal constantly criticized the agency throughout the 1930s. He complained that its wages were too low, accused it of favoritism toward large industries, and complained that it was too slow in buying out independent power companies. After TVA had bought out most independent power companies, Neal complained that the loss of the companies hurt Tennessee counties which had relied on their tax dollars. When TVA forced Neal to sell his Rhea Springs property during the Watts Bar project (when the entire community was inundated), Neal sued, and was eventually paid $55,000 for the land.

== Political campaigns ==
In the 40 years following the loss of his state senate seat, Neal, a Democrat, ran for U.S. senator 18 times, for governor 9 times, and for the U.S. House of Representatives once, always losing by a substantial margin. He briefly ran for governor in 1910, but withdrew before the primary. He ran again in 1912 (even though he continued teaching at the University of Denver during the campaign), but again withdrew before the primary. That same year, he campaigned for one of the state's U.S. Senate seats, but lost.

In 1924, Nashville Banner publisher E.B. Stahlman, an opponent of Governor Peay, recruited Neal to oppose Peay in the gubernatorial primary, but Peay won easily. In 1930, Neal ran for U.S. senator, but lost in the primary to William Brock. He again ran for the senate in 1934, but was defeated in the primary by Kenneth McKellar. In 1944, Neal ran for governor, but lost in the primary to Jim Nance McCord. Two years later, he ran for both governor and senator, and when he lost in the primary in each election, he ran as an independent in the general election. Neal's last campaign was in 1954, when he ran for governor against Frank G. Clement.

== Later life ==
In the years after the Scopes Trial, Neal took on a number of liberal causes. In 1929, he defended several Gastonia, North Carolina, cotton mill workers who had been accused of killing a foreman during a strike. That same year, he defended several striking workers in Elizabethton, Tennessee, and worked as an advocate for striking students at Lincoln Memorial University. In 1932, he defended striking workers who had been chased out of Harlan, Kentucky.

Following the "Slaughter" incident at U.T., Neal formed his own law school, the John Randolph Neal School of Law. This school reached its peak in the mid-1930s, graduating over 40 students in 1935 alone. It was forced to close in 1943 after the state passed a law requiring full-time attendance at law schools.

Neal spent the last few years of his life at his home in Spring City, occasionally visiting nearby Watts Bar Dam. He died of pneumonia in Rockwood, Tennessee, on November 23, 1959.

== Personality ==
Neal was legendary among his peers for his eccentric personality and his lack of concern for his appearance. He rarely bathed, and slept in his suits, which he would often wear for days without washing. He once appeared on a platform with Eleanor Roosevelt with his shoes untied and shirt and pants unbuttoned, and spent much of the Scopes Trial unshaven and disheveled. In The Great Monkey Trial, L. Sprague de Camp described Neal as "eccentric and absent-minded," and "as dirty as some early Christian saints." Commenting on Neal's reputation as a wishy-washy politician, humorist Will Rogers wrote, "I don't know about the wishy, but he certainly is not washy."

After the Scopes Trial, Neal's hygiene deteriorated to the point where he was banned from the S&W Cafeteria in downtown Knoxville. He was also kicked out of the Watauga Hotel (where he lived in Knoxville) when he refused to clean his room or allow hotel staff to clean it. When asked about his appearance, Neal said he dressed as he did to protest conformity, and stated that neither the government nor society was going to tell him how to dress.

Neal also had a habit of never bothering to cash checks, often carrying them around in his coat pocket for weeks. U.T.'s accountants had to consistently plead with Neal to cash his paychecks so they could balance their books, and many students at his law school attended for free since Neal often forgot to cash their tuition checks. A TVA auditor once confronted Neal after he neglected to cash the $55,000 check for his Rhea Springs property, and recalled that Neal sifted through nearly three dozen uncashed checks before finding the crumpled TVA check in his back pocket.

In Cormac McCarthy's 1979 novel, Suttree, the title character runs into Neal, who had been a friend of his father's, while walking through the streets of Knoxville in the 1950s. He describes Neal as, "a lifelong friend of doomed defendants, causes lost, alone and friendless in a hundred courts."

== See also ==
- James Alexander Fowler
- Sue K. Hicks
- Ray Jenkins
- Hugh B. Lindsay
