= Floterial district =

Legislative district that includes several separate districts

A floterial district is a legislative district that includes several separate districts that are also independently represented in the legislative body, but whose combined population entitles the area to another seat. It is a technique that a state may be authorized to use to achieve more equal apportionment by population during redistricting.

In common usage, a floterial district is not just a multi-town district, but a multi-town district that "floats" over towns that already elect one or more legislators. For example, a city due more than five representatives but not quite six might elect five representing the city itself, and one more in a floterial district that includes some neighboring towns whose small populations, alone, would not merit even a single representative.

Several U.S. states have used floterial districts for state offices, including Alaska, Idaho, New Hampshire, Tennessee and Texas; as of 2026, only New Hampshire uses them.

== Examples ==
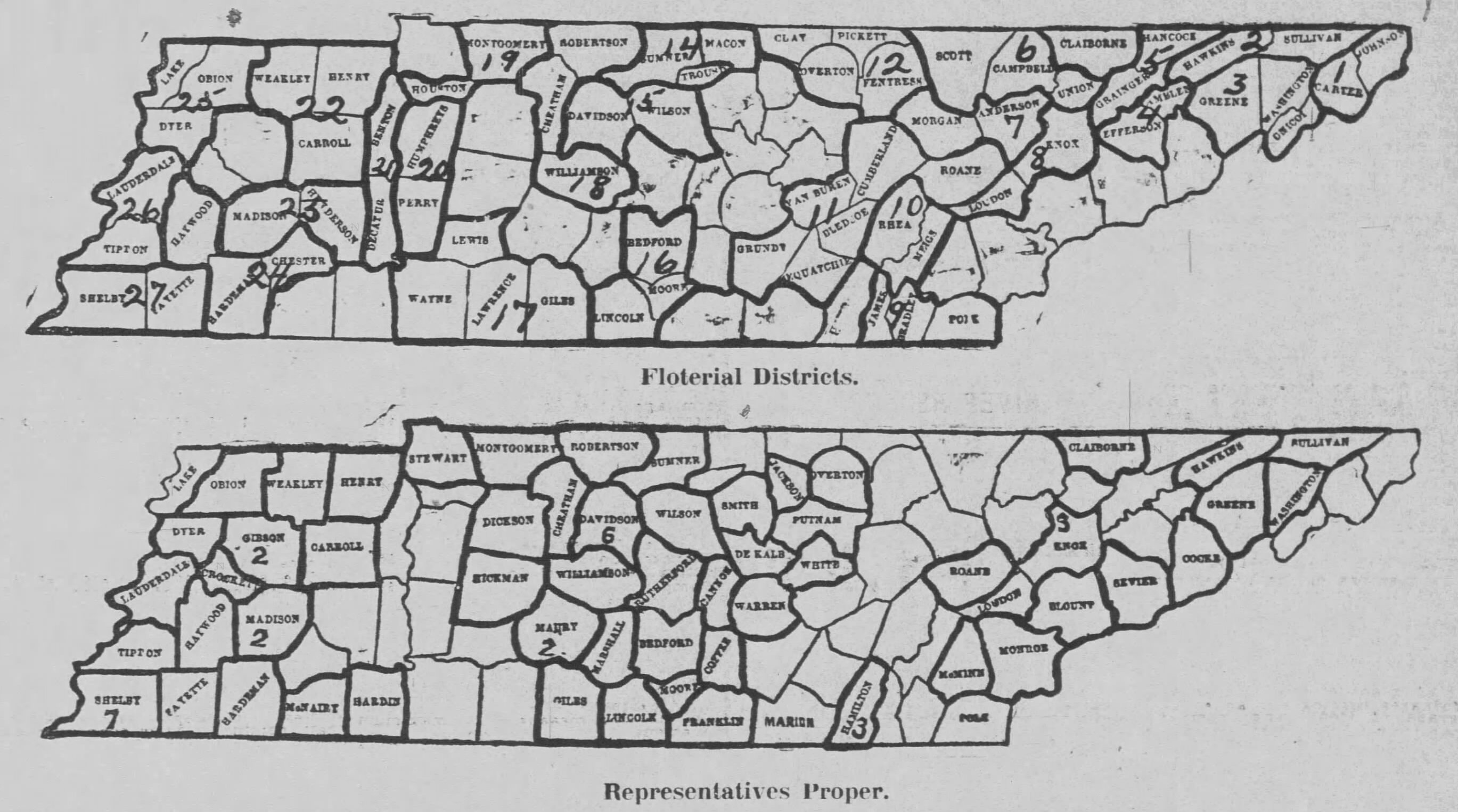
The state representative districts of the U.S. State of Tennessee as they were in 1910, floterial districts on top.

New Hampshire's Rockingham District 32 is a floterial district comprising Brentwood, Danville, and Fremont, whose voters jointly elect one representative; each of these towns separately elects one other representative of Rockingham 6, 8, and 7, respectively. Floterial districts may have multiple representatives; for example, Claremont and one adjoining town elect three representatives to Sullivan District 6, they and seven other towns elect two more to the floterial district Sullivan 8, and those seven towns also elect two representatives from districts Sullivan 4 and 5 respectively.

In Austria the National Council is elected using an open list proportional representation system that employs three rungs of floterial districts; each of the nine States of Austria constitutes a state-level electoral district, and is also divided into smaller local districts, of which there are 39 in total. The higher-rung floterial districts are used merely for leveling seats; Seats are first filled at the local district level, using the Hare method; seats unfilled for the local district are then filled for the state district, also using the Hare method; any remaining seats are allocated using the D'Hondt method at the federal level, to ensure overall proportionality between a party's national vote share and its share of parliamentary seats.

Based on the Reapportionment Act of 1929, 2 U.S.C. § 2a reapportions the U.S. House to the states following each decennial census. If a state received additional representatives but failed to redistrict, the additional representatives would be elected at-large, so the entire state would be a floterial district. This has occurred in many states. However, subsequent decisions of the U.S. Supreme Court, such as Reynolds v. Sims (the "one man, one vote" decision), now oblige the states to redistrict.

== New Hampshire litigation ==
In 1982, U.S. District Court in Boyer v. Gardner upheld New Hampshire's reapportionment of the 400-person House of Representatives using floterial districts. The plaintiffs had taken issue with the "aggregate method," which compares the relative voting power of the group of districts with both floterial and dedicated representatives, and had asked the court to consider the "component method." For example, a small town paired with a large city in a floterial district would be unlikely ever to control that House seat.

However, after the reapportionment of 2002, the New Hampshire Supreme Court found that towns and wards with floterial districts elect different numbers of representatives, the floterial scheme is "complicated and often confusing", and the floterial scheme is not specified in the state constitution. Finding that none of the plans submitted to it correctly used figures from the 2000 census and that all of them had political components, the court redistricted the state into 88 districts, none of them floterial, and all but five electing multiple representatives.

Legislators and voters were dissatisfied that the larger districts in the court's plan valued numerical equality over more local representation. Consequently, the New Hampshire constitution was amended in 2006 to guarantee a representative for each town or ward "within a reasonable deviation from the ideal population for one or more representative seats" and to explicitly authorize floterial districts for fine-tuning.

== See also ==
- National remnant
