= Austin Peay =

American politician and governor of Tennessee (1876–1927)

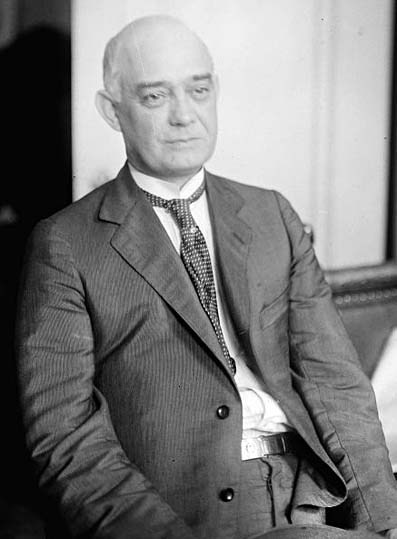
- Peay in the 1920s

35th Governor of Tennessee
- In office January 16, 1923 – October 2, 1927
- Preceded by: Alfred A. Taylor
- Succeeded by: Henry H. Horton

Personal details
- Born: June 1, 1876 Christian County, Kentucky, U.S.
- Died: October 2, 1927 (aged 51) Nashville, Tennessee, U.S.
- Resting place: Greenwood Cemetery, Clarksville, Tennessee
- Party: Democratic
- Spouse: Sallie Hurst (m. 1895)
- Education: Centre College
- Profession: Attorney

Austin Peay (/piː/; June 1, 1876 – October 2, 1927) was an American politician who served as the 35th governor of Tennessee from 1923 to 1927. He was the state's first governor since the Civil War to win three consecutive terms and the first to die in office. Prior to his election as governor, he served two terms in the Tennessee House of Representatives (1901–1905).

As governor, Peay consolidated government agencies, overhauled the tax code, improved higher education, expanded the state highway system, and converted a $3 million state debt into a budget surplus. He created Tennessee's first state park and assured the establishment of the Great Smoky Mountains National Park. During his tenure, the balance of power in state politics shifted from the state legislature to the governor.

In 1925, Peay signed the Butler Act into law. The law barred the teaching of the theory of evolution in public schools and led to the Scopes Trial.

== Early life ==
Peay was born in Christian County, Kentucky, the son of Austin Peay, a farmer, and Cornelia (Leavell) Peay. He attended Washington and Lee University in Lexington, Virginia, and Centre College in Danville, Kentucky, before moving to Clarksville, Tennessee, to practice law. He was practically penniless when he married Sallie Hurst in Clarksville in 1895.

In 1900, Peay was elected to Montgomery County's seat in the Tennessee House of Representatives. He was elected chairman of the Tennessee Democratic Committee in 1905.

In 1908, Peay managed Governor Malcolm R. Patterson's successful reelection campaign. In October of that year, Peay's campaign associate, Duncan Cooper, and his son, Robin Cooper, were involved in a shootout in Nashville that killed Patterson's political foe, Edward W. Carmack. Following the shooting, Peay withdrew from state politics and returned to his law practice in Clarksville.

== Governor ==
In 1918, Peay ran for governor as a Democrat, losing by 12,000 votes to Albert H. Roberts in the primary election.

In 1922, Peay defeated former Governor Benton McMillin for the Democratic nomination for governor and Republican incumbent Alfred A. Taylor in the General election.

When Peay took office, Tennessee was $3 million in debt and had a tax code that relied heavily on property taxes. The state had 244 miles (393 km) of paved roads and few bridges, and its education system was ranked last in several categories. State government was scattered across 64 departments over which the governor had little control.

Following his inauguration in 1923, Peay signed the Administrative Reorganization Act which enabled him to make reforms. The measure consolidated the state's 64 departments into eight centralized departments that were each headed by a commissioner who answered to the governor. The measure also gave the governor control over the state budget.

To update the state's tax code, Peay signed measures lowering property taxes while placing new taxes on corporate profits. He enacted a policy of paying for projects with available funding as opposed to bond issues. By his third term, the state's $3 million debt had become a $1.2 million surplus.

Peay implemented a 2 percent tax on gasoline and automobile registration fees to finance road construction. By the time of Peay's death in 1927, Tennessee's highways had expanded from 244 miles (393 km) to more than 4,000 miles (6,400 km), including one highway connecting Memphis and Bristol at opposite ends of the state. Seventeen new bridges were also constructed.

In the 1924 governor's race, Peay defeated Republican candidate Thomas Peck 152,000 votes to 121,238 in the general election.

In his second term, Peay enacted the Education Act of 1925. He expanded the school year to eight months, established licensing requirements and salary schedules for teachers, and increased funding for the University of Tennessee. The state authorized the establishment of a normal school, now Austin Peay State University, in Clarksville and an agricultural institute, now the University of Tennessee at Martin.

Peay dedicated Reelfoot Lake in Obion County as a hunting and fishing reserve in 1925. He created the Tennessee State Parks and Forestry Commission in 1925.

In March 1925, Peay signed the Butler Act, banning the teaching of the Theory of Evolution in the state's schools. The law was challenged by Dayton teacher John T. Scopes and the American Civil Liberties Union.

Peay won a third term as Governor in 1926, defeating Hill McAlister in the primary election and Walter White in the general.

Shortly after beginning his third term, Peay's health began to decline and he died from a cerebral hemorrhage at 8:05 p.m. on October 2, 1927. He was buried in Greenwood Cemetery.

== Legacy ==
A 1981 poll of 52 Tennessee historians placed Austin Peay at number 1 in an all-time ranking of Tennessee's governors.

Entities named for Peay include Austin Peay State University and a portion of Tennessee State Route 14.

== Family ==
Peay married Sallie Hurst in 1895. They had two children.

== See also ==
- List of governors of Tennessee

Party political offices
Preceded by Albert H. Roberts	Democratic nominee for Governor of Tennessee; 1922, 1924, 1926	Succeeded by Henry Hollis Horton
Political offices
Preceded by Alfred A. Taylor	Governor of Tennessee; 1923-1927	Succeeded by Henry H. Horton
