= Benton McMillin =

American politician and diplomat

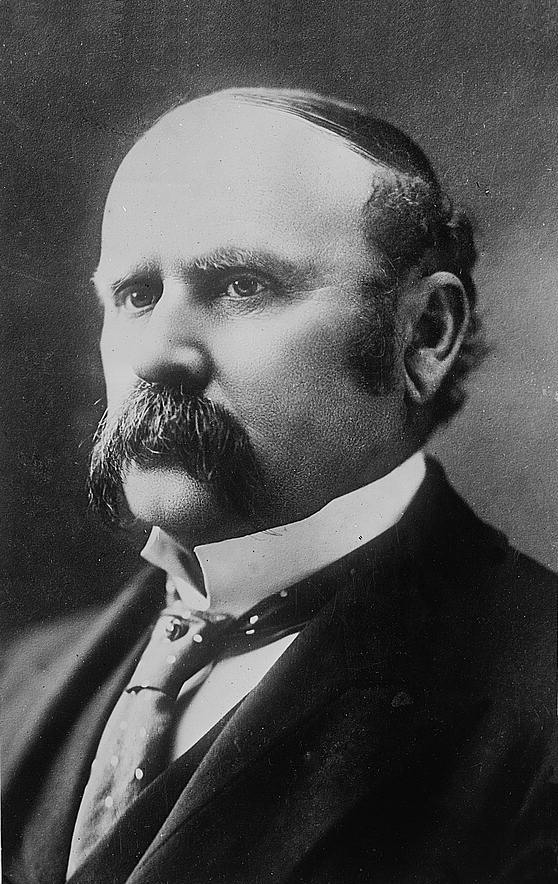
- McMillin, c. 1910-1915

27th Governor of Tennessee
- In office January 16, 1899 – January 19, 1903
- Preceded by: Robert Love Taylor
- Succeeded by: James B. Frazier

United States Minister to Peru
- In office September 9, 1913 – September 5, 1919
- President: Woodrow Wilson
- Preceded by: H. Clay Howard
- Succeeded by: William E. Gonzales

United States Minister to Guatemala
- In office January 15, 1920 – December 6, 1921
- President: Woodrow Wilson; Warren G. Harding
- Preceded by: William H. Leavell
- Succeeded by: Arthur H. Geissler

Member of the U.S. House of Representatives from Tennessee's 4th district
- In office March 4, 1879 – January 6, 1899
- Preceded by: Haywood Y. Riddle
- Succeeded by: Charles E. Snodgrass

Member of the Tennessee House of Representatives
- In office 1875–1877

Personal details
- Born: September 11, 1845 Monroe County, Kentucky, US
- Died: January 8, 1933 (aged 87) Nashville, Tennessee, US
- Resting place: Mount Olivet Cemetery (Nashville)
- Party: Democratic
- Spouse(s): Marie Childress Brown (1886–1887, her death); Lucille Foster (m. 1897)
- Relations: John C. Brown (father-in-law)
- Profession: Attorney

Benton McMillin (September 11, 1845 – January 8, 1933) was an American politician and diplomat. He served as the 27th governor of Tennessee from 1899 to 1903 and represented Tennessee's 4th district in the United States House of Representatives from 1879 to 1899. He served as a diplomat during the administration of President Woodrow Wilson, initially as Minister to Peru (1913–1919) and afterward as Minister to Guatemala (1920–1921).

Known as the "Democratic War Horse" for his persistent campaigning on behalf of the Democratic Party, McMillin served as an elector in fourteen presidential elections from 1876 to 1932 and attended nearly every Democratic National Convention during that period. As governor, he signed anti-child labor legislation and standardized the state's school textbooks. His attempts to create a federal income tax as a Representative led to the landmark Supreme Court decision, Pollock v. Farmers' Loan & Trust Co. (1895), which declared the federal income tax to be unconstitutional.

== Early life ==
McMillin was born in Monroe County, Kentucky, the son of John McMillin, a wealthy planter, and Elizabeth (Black) McMillin. He attended Philomath Academy in Clay County, Tennessee, and later attended Kentucky A&M (now the University of Kentucky) in Lexington. During the Civil War, McMillin supported the Confederacy, and wanted to join the Confederate Army but was unable to obtain his father's permission. At one point, he was captured by Union forces and briefly jailed for refusing to take the Oath of Allegiance.

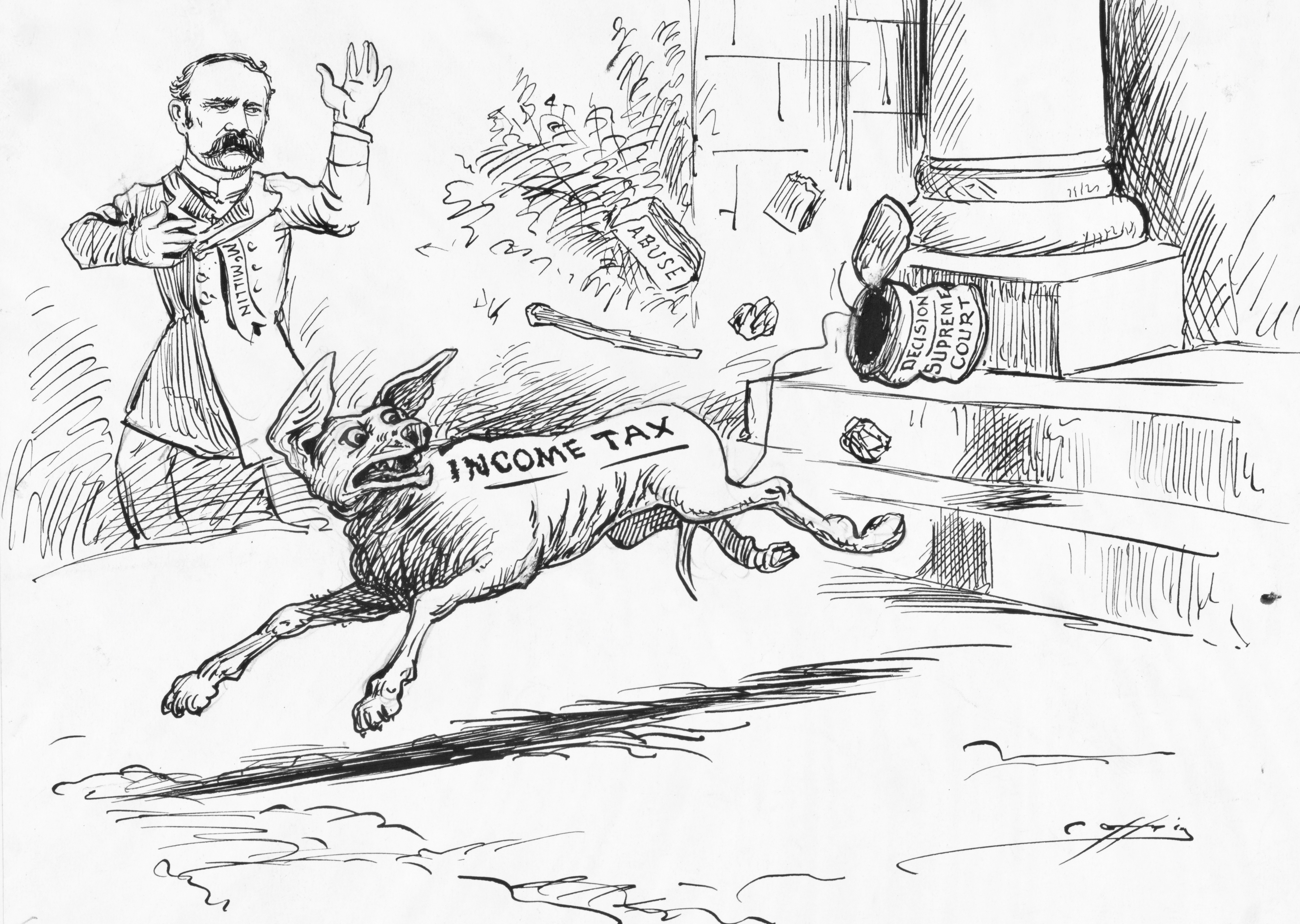
George Yost Coffin cartoon depicting McMillin's reaction to the Supreme Court's decision in Pollock v. Farmers' Loan & Trust Co. (1895)

After the war, McMillin studied law with Judge E. L. Gardenshire in Carthage, Tennessee. He was admitted to the bar in 1871, and began practicing in Celina, Tennessee. In 1874, he was elected to the Tennessee House of Representatives. The following year, he was appointed by Governor James D. Porter to negotiate a territorial purchase from Kentucky. In 1877, following his term in the state legislature, he was appointed special judge of the state's Fifth Judicial District by Governor Porter.

In 1878, McMillin was elected to the first of ten consecutive terms in the U.S. House of Representatives, defeating 4th District incumbent Haywood Y. Riddle. Throughout his 20-year tenure, McMillin opposed excess government spending, tariffs, and most of the nation's global exploits, which he deemed imperialistic. He also opposed the Lodge Bill of 1890, which would have provided protections for black voters in the South. McMillin supported antitrust legislation and currency expansion. As a member of the House Rules Committee in the 1890s, he frequently challenged Speaker of the House Thomas B. Reed.

In 1894, McMillin attached an amendment to the Wilson–Gorman Tariff Act that established a federal income tax. The law was challenged in federal court, however, and in 1895, the Supreme Court ruled federal income taxes unconstitutional when it issued its decision in Pollock v. Farmers' Loan & Trust Co. McMillin continued campaigning in favor of federal income taxes until the 1913 adoption of the Sixteenth Amendment, which gave the federal government the power to collect income taxes.

== Governor ==
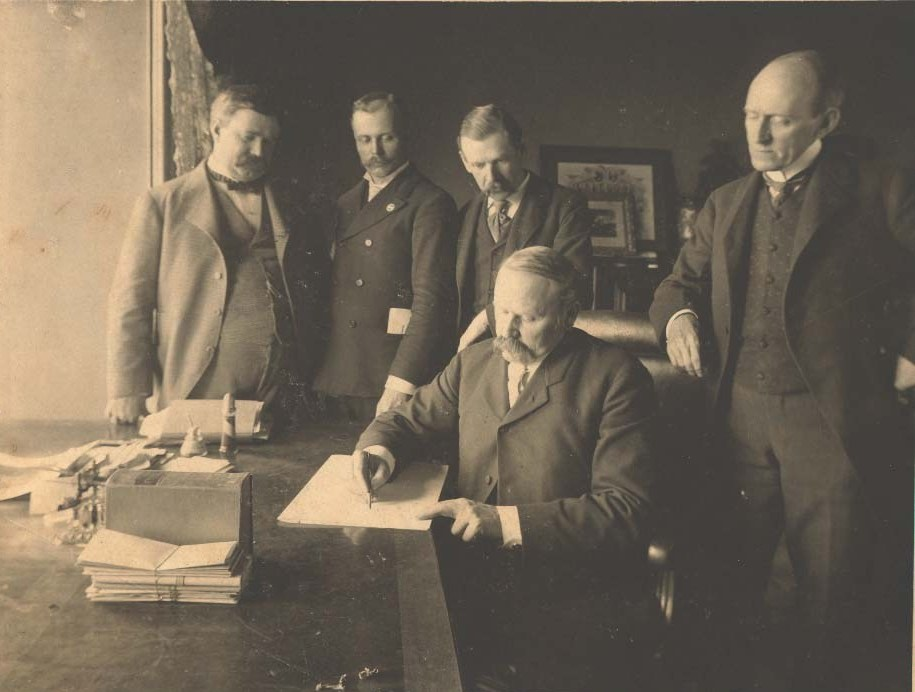
McMillin signing child labor legislation in 1901

In 1897, McMillin sought the U.S. Senate seat left vacant by the death of Isham G. Harris. Failing to garner any support, he then sought and successfully obtained the Democratic nomination for governor the following year in the race to succeed the popular Governor Robert Love Taylor. McMillin won by a large margin on election day, with 105,640 votes to 72,611 for Republican candidate James Alexander Fowler, 2,428 for Populist candidate W.D. Turley, and 1,722 for Prohibition candidate R.N. Richardson.

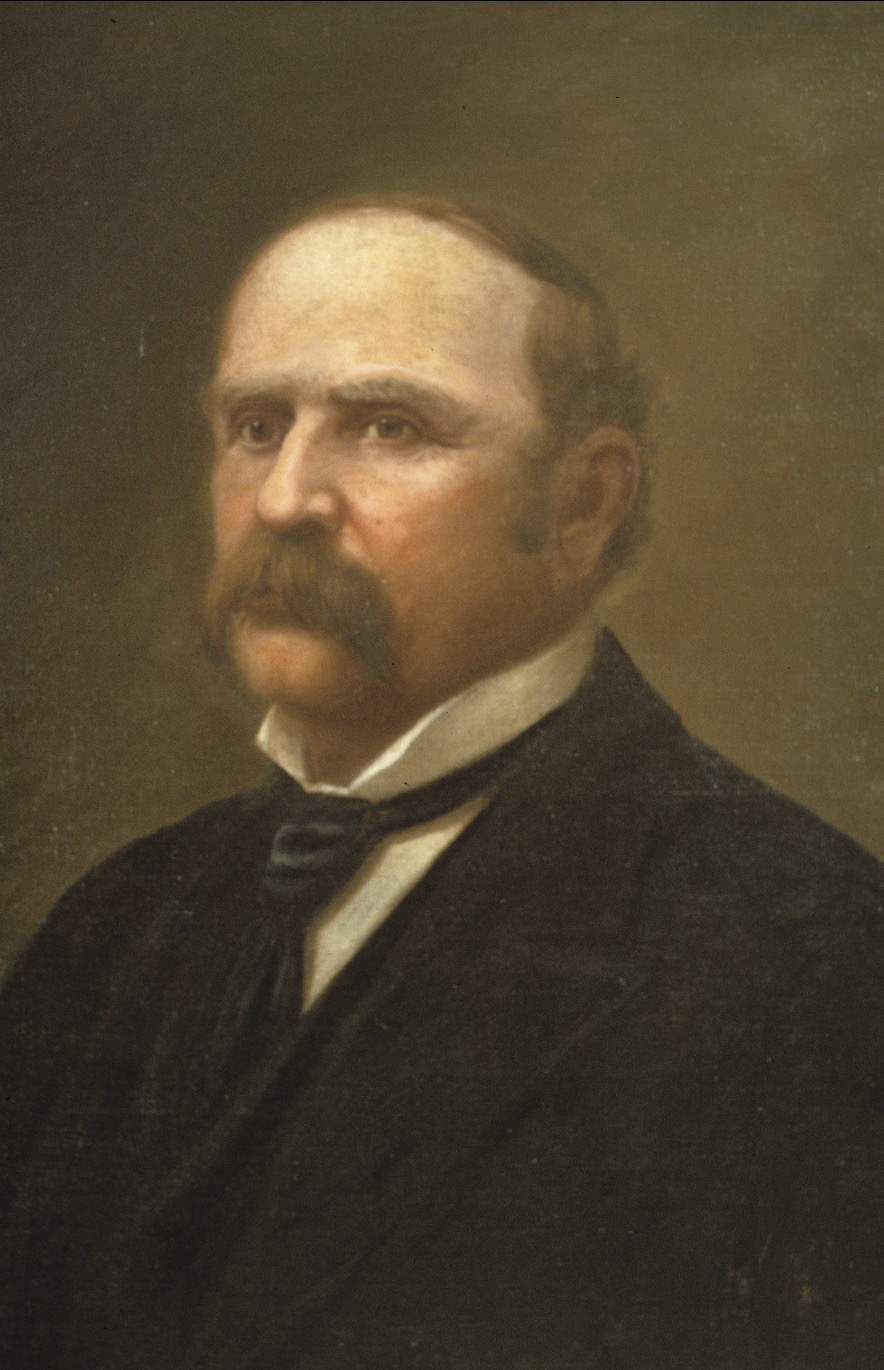
Portrait of McMillin as governor, c. 1902

By the time McMillin ran for reelection in 1900, the state's Republican Party had come under the control of Congressman Walter P. Brownlow. Seeking to unseat McMillin, Brownlow and his faction nominated Representative John E. McCall as the party's candidate for governor. While the party ran a strong campaign, McMillin was easily re-elected by winning 145,708 votes to 119,831 for McCall.

During his two terms, McMillin implemented a number of progressive measures. He signed legislation authorizing counties to establish high schools and school boards and instituted a property tax to pay for school textbooks. In 1901, he signed legislation aimed at reducing child labor by increasing the state's minimum age for employment from 12 to 14. He also finalized the state's boundary with Virginia and set up a sinking fund to reduce the state debt.

== Later life ==
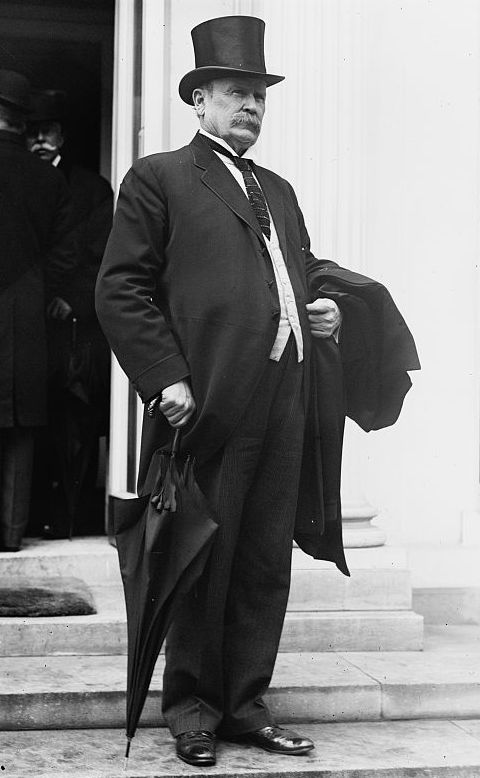
McMillin, photographed by Harris & Ewing in 1913

After his second term as governor ended in 1903, McMillin established an insurance business in Nashville. He remained active in Democratic Party politics, however, and served as an elector in every presidential election between 1876 and 1932, with the exception of the 1916 election, and attended every Democratic National Convention during the same period, with the exception of the 1920 convention.

In 1912, a divided Democratic Party nominated McMillin as the party's candidate for governor in the hopes of unseating Republican Ben W. Hooper. The party was divided over the prohibition issue, with one faction, the "Independent Democrats" (which supported statewide prohibition), having withdrawn from the party and formed a coalition (the "Fusionists") with Republicans. McMillin represented the other faction, the "Regular Democrats," which believed the state's largest cities should be exempt from prohibition. He was defeated in the general election by winning just 116,610 votes to Hooper's 124,641. One factor in the electoral loss may well have been the death of McMillin's only son in Bristol, Tennessee, who took ill at the end of October. When the doctors lost hope, the candidate McMillin and his wife stayed at his son's bedside for nearly a week and canceled all engagements.

In 1913, President Woodrow Wilson appointed McMillin Envoy Extraordinary and Minister Plenipotentiary to Peru. Shortly after arriving in the Peruvian capital, Lima, he helped negotiate an "Advancement of Peace" that formalized relations between the two countries.

In 1919, McMillin was appointed Minister to Guatemala. A few months after his arrival, a revolt erupted against the unpopular President Manuel Estrada Cabrera, with Cabrera eventually surrendering to McMillin to avoid capture by supporters of Carlos Herrera. The American embassy was damaged during Herrera's five-day bombardment of the capital. Herrera would also be deposed in a coup before the end of McMillin's tenure.

Upon returning to Tennessee, McMillin again sought his party's nomination for governor. His chief opponent was Clarksville farmer and public education advocate Austin Peay. Although the 77-year-old McMillin campaigned vigorously, Peay had the support of rising political boss E. H. Crump, and edged McMillin for the nomination, 63,940 votes to 59,922.

After his defeat in the 1922 campaign, McMillin returned to his insurance business. He died in Nashville on January 8, 1933, and is buried in the city's Mount Olivet Cemetery.

== Family and influence ==
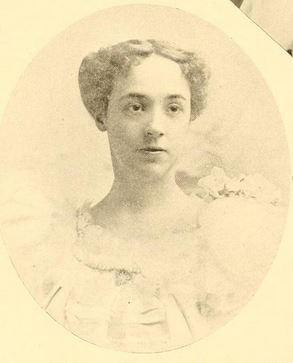
Lucille Foster

McMillin married Marie Childress Brown, the daughter of Governor John C. Brown and First Lady Elizabeth Childress Brown, in 1886. They had a son, John Brown McMillin (1887–1912), before she died the following year. In 1897, McMillin married Lucille Foster, a noted women's suffragist and president of the Tennessee Federation of Women's Clubs. She served as a civil service commissioner under President Franklin D. Roosevelt in the 1940s. She and McMillin had one daughter, Ellinor Foster McMillin Oliver (1898–1919).

McMillin's brother, Joseph, was a teacher at the Montvale Academy in Celina. One of his students was future Secretary of State Cordell Hull, who later recalled Benton McMillin as one of his political mentors.

== See also ==
- List of governors of Tennessee

Party political offices
Preceded by Robert Love Taylor	Democratic nominee for Governor of Tennessee; 1898, 1900	Succeeded by James B. Frazier
Preceded by Robert Love Taylor	Democratic nominee for Governor of Tennessee; 1912	Succeeded by Thomas Clarke Rye
U.S. House of Representatives
Preceded by Haywood Yancey Riddle	Member of the U.S. House of Representatives from Tennessee's 4th congressional district 1879–1899	Succeeded by Charles Edward Snodgrass
Political offices
Preceded by Robert Love Taylor	Governor of Tennessee; 1899–1903	Succeeded by James B. Frazier
Diplomatic posts
Preceded by H. Clay Howard	United States Minister to Peru; 9 September 1913 – 5 September 1919	Succeeded by William E. Gonzales
Preceded by William Hayne Leavell	United States Minister to Guatemala; January 15, 1920 – December 6, 1921	Succeeded by Arthur H. Geissler
