= 1900 United States presidential election in Tennessee =

- November 6, 1900

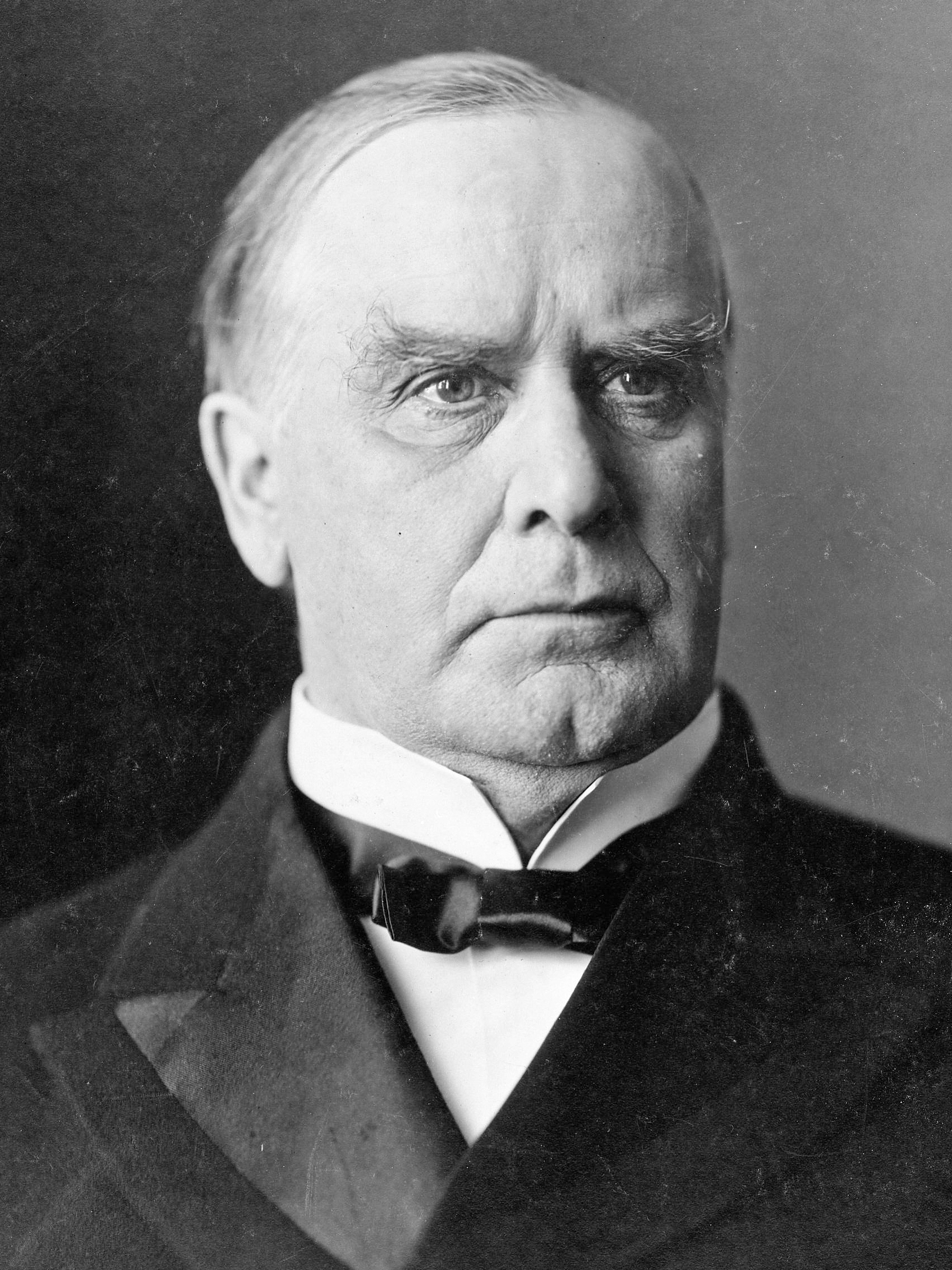
| Nominee | William Jennings Bryan | William McKinley |
| Party | Democratic | Republican |
| Home state | Nebraska | Ohio |
| Running mate | Adlai Stevenson I | Theodore Roosevelt |
| Electoral vote | 12 | 0 |
| Popular vote | 145,240 | 123,108 |
| Percentage | 53.03% | 44.95% |
County results
Bryan
50–60%
60–70%
70–80%
80–90%
90–100%
McKinley
40–50%
50–60%
60–70%
70–80%
80–90%
President before election
William McKinley
Republican
Elected President
William McKinley
Republican

The 1900 United States presidential election in Tennessee took place on November 6, 1900. All contemporary 45 states were part of the 1900 United States presidential election. Voters chose 12 electors to the Electoral College, which selected the president and vice president.

For over a century after the Civil War, Tennessee’s white population was divided according to partisan loyalties established in that war. Unionist regions covering almost all of East Tennessee, Kentucky Pennyroyal-allied Macon County, and the five West Tennessee Highland Rim counties of Carroll, Henderson, McNairy, Hardin and Wayne voted Republican – generally by landslide margins – as they associated the Democratic Party with secessionism. Conversely, the rest of Middle and West Tennessee who had supported and driven the state's secession was equally fiercely Democratic as it associated the Republicans with Reconstruction. After the state's white landowning class re-established its rule in the early 1870s, blacks and Unionist whites combined to give a competitive political system for two decades, although in this era the Republicans could only capture statewide offices when the Democratic Party was divided on the issue of payment of state debt.

White Democrats in West Tennessee consistently sought to eliminate Black political influence, committing election fraud in the mid-1880s, instituting poll taxes statewide, and, in counties with significant black populations, implementing a secret ballot that prevented illiterates voting, all of which cut turnout by at least a third in the 1890s. Although the poll tax was supposedly relaxed or paid by party officials in Unionist Republican areas, turnout would continue to decline seriously in later years, although overall presidential partisan percentages did not change substantially as the GOP attempted to attract Democrats who would benefit from tariffs.

On election day, Tennessee was won by the Democratic ticket, former U.S. Representative and 1896 Democratic presidential nominee William Jennings Bryan and his running mate, former Vice President Adlai Stevenson I. They defeated the Republican ticket of incumbent President William McKinley of Ohio and his running mate Theodore Roosevelt of New York. Bryan won the state by a margin of 8.08%, an increase of 2.32 percent on his 1896 margin over McKinley, a small change but a substantial one given the extremely deep partisan loyalties of white Tennesseans. His increased margin reflected more complete black disenfranchisement and reduced suspicion of his free-silver policies in the major urban areas, which saw him carry normally Republican Knox County. McKinley is the only Republican to win two terms in the White House without carrying Tennessee either time. Neither McKinley nor Bryan campaigned in Tennessee, and by the fourth week of October it became clear that the state would once again go to the Democrats.

Bryan would later win the state again against William Howard Taft in 1908.

== Results ==
1900 United States presidential election in Tennessee
| Party | Candidate | Votes | Percentage | Electoral votes |
|---|---|---|---|---|
| Democratic | William Jennings Bryan | 145,240 | 53.03% | 12 |
| Republican | William McKinley (incumbent) | 123,108 | 44.95% | 0 |
| Prohibition | John G. Woolley | 3,844 | 1.40% | 0 |
| Populist | Wharton Barker | 1,322 | 0.48% | 0 |
| Social Democratic | Eugene V. Debs | 346 | 0.13% | 0 |
| Totals | | 273,860 | 100.00% | 12 |
| Voter turnout | | | | — |

=== Results by county ===
1900 United States presidential election in Tennessee by county
| County | William Jennings Bryan Democratic | | William McKinley Republican | | John G. Woolley Prohibition | | Wharton Barker Populist | | Eugene V. Debs Social Democratic | | Margin | | Total votes cast |
| County | # | % | # | % | # | % | # | % | # | % | # | % | Total votes cast |
|---|---|---|---|---|---|---|---|---|---|---|---|---|---|
| Anderson | 732 | 26.73% | 1,997 | 72.91% | 10 | 0.37% | 0 | 0.00% | 0 | 0.00% | -1,265 | -46.18% | 2,739 |
| Bedford | 2,176 | 60.70% | 1,357 | 37.85% | 42 | 1.17% | 10 | 0.28% | 0 | 0.00% | 819 | 22.85% | 3,585 |
| Benton | 1,385 | 63.77% | 720 | 33.15% | 25 | 1.15% | 42 | 1.93% | 0 | 0.00% | 665 | 30.62% | 2,172 |
| Bledsoe | 498 | 40.32% | 734 | 59.43% | 3 | 0.24% | 0 | 0.00% | 0 | 0.00% | -236 | -19.11% | 1,235 |
| Blount | 825 | 26.74% | 2,201 | 71.35% | 59 | 1.91% | 0 | 0.00% | 0 | 0.00% | -1,376 | -44.60% | 3,085 |
| Bradley | 909 | 35.51% | 1,579 | 61.68% | 72 | 2.81% | 0 | 0.00% | 0 | 0.00% | -670 | -26.17% | 2,560 |
| Campbell | 479 | 17.54% | 2,189 | 80.15% | 42 | 1.54% | 0 | 0.00% | 21 | 0.77% | -1,710 | -62.61% | 2,731 |
| Cannon | 1,213 | 60.95% | 775 | 38.94% | 2 | 0.10% | 0 | 0.00% | 0 | 0.00% | 438 | 22.01% | 1,990 |
| Carroll | 1,931 | 41.64% | 2,516 | 54.26% | 55 | 1.19% | 135 | 2.91% | 0 | 0.00% | -585 | -12.62% | 4,637 |
| Carter | 408 | 12.72% | 2,763 | 86.13% | 37 | 1.15% | 0 | 0.00% | 0 | 0.00% | -2,355 | -73.41% | 3,208 |
| Cheatham | 1,190 | 71.82% | 440 | 26.55% | 24 | 1.45% | 3 | 0.18% | 0 | 0.00% | 750 | 45.26% | 1,657 |
| Chester | 894 | 53.21% | 702 | 41.79% | 8 | 0.48% | 76 | 4.52% | 0 | 0.00% | 192 | 11.43% | 1,680 |
| Claiborne | 770 | 43.68% | 987 | 55.98% | 6 | 0.34% | 0 | 0.00% | 0 | 0.00% | -217 | -12.31% | 1,763 |
| Clay | 830 | 61.25% | 498 | 36.75% | 12 | 0.89% | 11 | 0.81% | 4 | 0.30% | 332 | 24.50% | 1,355 |
| Cocke | 1,001 | 29.69% | 2,360 | 70.01% | 10 | 0.30% | 0 | 0.00% | 0 | 0.00% | -1,359 | -40.31% | 3,371 |
| Coffee | 1,660 | 70.34% | 624 | 26.44% | 45 | 1.91% | 2 | 0.08% | 29 | 1.23% | 1,036 | 43.90% | 2,360 |
| Crockett | 1,428 | 56.62% | 1,050 | 41.63% | 41 | 1.63% | 0 | 0.00% | 3 | 0.12% | 378 | 14.99% | 2,522 |
| Cumberland | 405 | 34.67% | 750 | 64.21% | 13 | 1.11% | 0 | 0.00% | 0 | 0.00% | -345 | -29.54% | 1,168 |
| Davidson | 6,869 | 70.81% | 2,501 | 25.78% | 232 | 2.39% | 31 | 0.32% | 67 | 0.69% | 4,368 | 45.03% | 9,700 |
| DeKalb | 1,528 | 50.43% | 1,442 | 47.59% | 60 | 1.98% | 0 | 0.00% | 0 | 0.00% | 86 | 2.84% | 3,030 |
| Decatur | 909 | 50.53% | 890 | 49.47% | 0 | 0.00% | 0 | 0.00% | 0 | 0.00% | 19 | 1.06% | 1,799 |
| Dickson | 1,691 | 62.47% | 964 | 35.61% | 39 | 1.44% | 10 | 0.37% | 3 | 0.11% | 727 | 26.86% | 2,707 |
| Dyer | 1,975 | 71.87% | 728 | 26.49% | 45 | 1.64% | 0 | 0.00% | 0 | 0.00% | 1,247 | 45.38% | 2,748 |
| Fayette | 2,282 | 71.31% | 885 | 27.66% | 20 | 0.63% | 12 | 0.38% | 1 | 0.03% | 1,397 | 43.66% | 3,200 |
| Fentress | 320 | 29.01% | 782 | 70.90% | 1 | 0.09% | 0 | 0.00% | 0 | 0.00% | -462 | -41.89% | 1,103 |
| Franklin | 2,196 | 76.49% | 613 | 21.35% | 62 | 2.16% | 0 | 0.00% | 0 | 0.00% | 1,583 | 55.14% | 2,871 |
| Gibson | 3,376 | 64.97% | 1,509 | 29.04% | 257 | 4.95% | 54 | 1.04% | 0 | 0.00% | 1,867 | 35.93% | 5,196 |
| Giles | 2,790 | 61.43% | 1,703 | 37.49% | 26 | 0.57% | 23 | 0.51% | 0 | 0.00% | 1,087 | 23.93% | 4,542 |
| Grainger | 960 | 34.68% | 1,802 | 65.10% | 6 | 0.22% | 0 | 0.00% | 0 | 0.00% | -842 | -30.42% | 2,768 |
| Greene | 2,868 | 47.89% | 3,091 | 51.61% | 30 | 0.50% | 0 | 0.00% | 0 | 0.00% | -223 | -3.72% | 5,989 |
| Grundy | 852 | 69.72% | 357 | 29.21% | 13 | 1.06% | 0 | 0.00% | 0 | 0.00% | 495 | 40.51% | 1,222 |
| Hamblen | 959 | 41.52% | 1,322 | 57.23% | 29 | 1.26% | 0 | 0.00% | 0 | 0.00% | -363 | -15.71% | 2,310 |
| Hamilton | 3,188 | 42.57% | 3,943 | 52.66% | 257 | 3.43% | 39 | 0.52% | 61 | 0.81% | -755 | -10.08% | 7,488 |
| Hancock | 382 | 21.09% | 1,429 | 78.91% | 0 | 0.00% | 0 | 0.00% | 0 | 0.00% | -1,047 | -57.81% | 1,811 |
| Hardeman | 1,974 | 59.42% | 1,336 | 40.22% | 3 | 0.09% | 9 | 0.27% | 0 | 0.00% | 638 | 19.21% | 3,322 |
| Hardin | 1,159 | 45.88% | 1,367 | 54.12% | 0 | 0.00% | 0 | 0.00% | 0 | 0.00% | -208 | -8.23% | 2,526 |
| Hawkins | 1,867 | 42.38% | 2,515 | 57.09% | 22 | 0.50% | 1 | 0.02% | 0 | 0.00% | -648 | -14.71% | 4,405 |
| Haywood | 1,452 | 85.87% | 214 | 12.66% | 16 | 0.95% | 4 | 0.24% | 5 | 0.30% | 1,238 | 73.21% | 1,691 |
| Henderson | 1,308 | 39.87% | 1,925 | 58.67% | 42 | 1.28% | 6 | 0.18% | 0 | 0.00% | -617 | -18.81% | 3,281 |
| Henry | 2,605 | 70.92% | 929 | 25.29% | 103 | 2.80% | 26 | 0.71% | 10 | 0.27% | 1,676 | 45.63% | 3,673 |
| Hickman | 1,292 | 58.22% | 894 | 40.29% | 9 | 0.41% | 24 | 1.08% | 0 | 0.00% | 398 | 17.94% | 2,219 |
| Houston | 738 | 66.85% | 341 | 30.89% | 25 | 2.26% | 0 | 0.00% | 0 | 0.00% | 397 | 35.96% | 1,104 |
| Humphreys | 1,561 | 69.78% | 614 | 27.45% | 54 | 2.41% | 4 | 0.18% | 4 | 0.18% | 947 | 42.33% | 2,237 |
| Jackson | 1,479 | 61.12% | 935 | 38.64% | 0 | 0.00% | 6 | 0.25% | 0 | 0.00% | 544 | 22.48% | 2,420 |
| James | 283 | 32.01% | 598 | 67.65% | 3 | 0.34% | 0 | 0.00% | 0 | 0.00% | -315 | -35.63% | 884 |
| Jefferson | 816 | 25.67% | 2,347 | 73.83% | 16 | 0.50% | 0 | 0.00% | 0 | 0.00% | -1,531 | -48.16% | 3,179 |
| Johnson | 189 | 10.42% | 1,618 | 89.20% | 7 | 0.39% | 0 | 0.00% | 0 | 0.00% | -1,429 | -78.78% | 1,814 |
| Knox | 4,389 | 51.08% | 3,982 | 46.35% | 120 | 1.40% | 47 | 0.55% | 54 | 0.63% | 407 | 4.74% | 8,592 |
| Lake | 558 | 73.52% | 201 | 26.48% | 0 | 0.00% | 0 | 0.00% | 0 | 0.00% | 357 | 47.04% | 759 |
| Lauderdale | 1,807 | 78.46% | 437 | 18.98% | 24 | 1.04% | 35 | 1.52% | 0 | 0.00% | 1,370 | 59.49% | 2,303 |
| Lawrence | 1,480 | 52.73% | 1,327 | 47.27% | 0 | 0.00% | 0 | 0.00% | 0 | 0.00% | 153 | 5.45% | 2,807 |
| Lewis | 400 | 66.23% | 202 | 33.44% | 2 | 0.33% | 0 | 0.00% | 0 | 0.00% | 198 | 32.78% | 604 |
| Lincoln | 2,463 | 72.19% | 728 | 21.34% | 168 | 4.92% | 53 | 1.55% | 0 | 0.00% | 1,735 | 50.85% | 3,412 |
| Loudon | 512 | 31.28% | 1,116 | 68.17% | 7 | 0.43% | 2 | 0.12% | 0 | 0.00% | -604 | -36.90% | 1,637 |
| Macon | 871 | 39.66% | 1,325 | 60.34% | 0 | 0.00% | 0 | 0.00% | 0 | 0.00% | -454 | -20.67% | 2,196 |
| Madison | 2,379 | 64.84% | 1,147 | 31.26% | 15 | 0.41% | 123 | 3.35% | 5 | 0.14% | 1,232 | 33.58% | 3,669 |
| Marion | 1,234 | 43.73% | 1,585 | 56.17% | 3 | 0.11% | 0 | 0.00% | 0 | 0.00% | -351 | -12.44% | 2,822 |
| Marshall | 2,184 | 69.27% | 763 | 24.20% | 95 | 3.01% | 111 | 3.52% | 0 | 0.00% | 1,421 | 45.07% | 3,153 |
| Maury | 3,325 | 56.42% | 2,491 | 42.27% | 53 | 0.90% | 24 | 0.41% | 0 | 0.00% | 834 | 14.15% | 5,893 |
| McMinn | 1,289 | 37.90% | 2,057 | 60.48% | 52 | 1.53% | 3 | 0.09% | 0 | 0.00% | -768 | -22.58% | 3,401 |
| McNairy | 1,443 | 48.37% | 1,498 | 50.22% | 7 | 0.23% | 35 | 1.17% | 0 | 0.00% | -55 | -1.84% | 2,983 |
| Meigs | 701 | 52.83% | 619 | 46.65% | 2 | 0.15% | 5 | 0.38% | 0 | 0.00% | 82 | 6.18% | 1,327 |
| Monroe | 1,634 | 47.40% | 1,743 | 50.57% | 69 | 2.00% | 1 | 0.03% | 0 | 0.00% | -109 | -3.16% | 3,447 |
| Montgomery | 2,248 | 51.30% | 1,815 | 41.42% | 318 | 7.26% | 1 | 0.02% | 0 | 0.00% | 433 | 9.88% | 4,382 |
| Moore | 838 | 91.09% | 66 | 7.17% | 16 | 1.74% | 0 | 0.00% | 0 | 0.00% | 772 | 83.91% | 920 |
| Morgan | 421 | 28.45% | 1,053 | 71.15% | 6 | 0.41% | 0 | 0.00% | 0 | 0.00% | -632 | -42.70% | 1,480 |
| Obion | 2,722 | 74.78% | 771 | 21.18% | 127 | 3.49% | 20 | 0.55% | 0 | 0.00% | 1,951 | 53.60% | 3,640 |
| Overton | 1,443 | 65.38% | 764 | 34.62% | 0 | 0.00% | 0 | 0.00% | 0 | 0.00% | 679 | 30.77% | 2,207 |
| Perry | 851 | 57.89% | 608 | 41.36% | 0 | 0.00% | 11 | 0.75% | 0 | 0.00% | 243 | 16.53% | 1,470 |
| Pickett | 345 | 40.16% | 514 | 59.84% | 0 | 0.00% | 0 | 0.00% | 0 | 0.00% | -169 | -19.67% | 859 |
| Polk | 737 | 44.83% | 906 | 55.11% | 0 | 0.00% | 1 | 0.06% | 0 | 0.00% | -169 | -10.28% | 1,644 |
| Putnam | 1,452 | 57.76% | 1,058 | 42.08% | 4 | 0.16% | 0 | 0.00% | 0 | 0.00% | 394 | 15.67% | 2,514 |
| Rhea | 798 | 47.93% | 832 | 49.97% | 33 | 1.98% | 1 | 0.06% | 1 | 0.06% | -34 | -2.04% | 1,665 |
| Roane | 740 | 22.06% | 2,429 | 72.42% | 148 | 4.41% | 14 | 0.42% | 23 | 0.69% | -1,689 | -50.36% | 3,354 |
| Robertson | 2,564 | 68.10% | 1,128 | 29.96% | 67 | 1.78% | 6 | 0.16% | 0 | 0.00% | 1,436 | 38.14% | 3,765 |
| Rutherford | 2,517 | 62.29% | 1,429 | 35.36% | 13 | 0.32% | 82 | 2.03% | 0 | 0.00% | 1,088 | 26.92% | 4,041 |
| Scott | 171 | 10.23% | 1,498 | 89.59% | 3 | 0.18% | 0 | 0.00% | 0 | 0.00% | -1,327 | -79.37% | 1,672 |
| Sequatchie | 375 | 62.71% | 216 | 36.12% | 7 | 1.17% | 0 | 0.00% | 0 | 0.00% | 159 | 26.59% | 598 |
| Sevier | 382 | 12.81% | 2,595 | 86.99% | 6 | 0.20% | 0 | 0.00% | 0 | 0.00% | -2,213 | -74.19% | 2,983 |
| Shelby | 5,143 | 62.50% | 2,961 | 35.98% | 42 | 0.51% | 32 | 0.39% | 51 | 0.62% | 2,182 | 26.52% | 8,229 |
| Smith | 1,940 | 61.16% | 1,118 | 35.25% | 80 | 2.52% | 34 | 1.07% | 0 | 0.00% | 822 | 25.91% | 3,172 |
| Stewart | 1,577 | 65.93% | 793 | 33.15% | 20 | 0.84% | 2 | 0.08% | 0 | 0.00% | 784 | 32.78% | 2,392 |
| Sullivan | 2,421 | 57.42% | 1,739 | 41.25% | 55 | 1.30% | 1 | 0.02% | 0 | 0.00% | 682 | 16.18% | 4,216 |
| Sumner | 2,589 | 75.68% | 776 | 22.68% | 26 | 0.76% | 26 | 0.76% | 4 | 0.12% | 1,813 | 53.00% | 3,421 |
| Tipton | 1,887 | 58.55% | 1,308 | 40.58% | 8 | 0.25% | 20 | 0.62% | 0 | 0.00% | 579 | 17.96% | 3,223 |
| Trousdale | 675 | 72.82% | 222 | 23.95% | 3 | 0.32% | 27 | 2.91% | 0 | 0.00% | 453 | 48.87% | 927 |
| Unicoi | 76 | 8.29% | 822 | 89.64% | 19 | 2.07% | 0 | 0.00% | 0 | 0.00% | -746 | -81.35% | 917 |
| Union | 566 | 27.22% | 1,501 | 72.20% | 12 | 0.58% | 0 | 0.00% | 0 | 0.00% | -935 | -44.97% | 2,079 |
| Van Buren | 425 | 73.40% | 153 | 26.42% | 1 | 0.17% | 0 | 0.00% | 0 | 0.00% | 272 | 46.98% | 579 |
| Warren | 1,926 | 74.13% | 672 | 25.87% | 0 | 0.00% | 0 | 0.00% | 0 | 0.00% | 1,254 | 48.27% | 2,598 |
| Washington | 1,496 | 36.98% | 2,488 | 61.51% | 60 | 1.48% | 1 | 0.02% | 0 | 0.00% | -992 | -24.52% | 4,045 |
| Wayne | 576 | 28.94% | 1,405 | 70.60% | 8 | 0.40% | 1 | 0.05% | 0 | 0.00% | -829 | -41.66% | 1,990 |
| Weakley | 3,609 | 62.74% | 1,990 | 34.60% | 123 | 2.14% | 30 | 0.52% | 0 | 0.00% | 1,619 | 28.15% | 5,752 |
| White | 1,658 | 70.92% | 656 | 28.06% | 24 | 1.03% | 0 | 0.00% | 0 | 0.00% | 1,002 | 42.86% | 2,338 |
| Williamson | 2,136 | 72.98% | 704 | 24.05% | 49 | 1.67% | 38 | 1.30% | 0 | 0.00% | 1,432 | 48.92% | 2,927 |
| Wilson | 2,674 | 70.20% | 1,061 | 27.86% | 66 | 1.73% | 8 | 0.21% | 0 | 0.00% | 1,613 | 42.35% | 3,809 |
| Totals | 145,249 | 53.04% | 123,108 | 44.95% | 3,844 | 1.40% | 1,323 | 0.48% | 346 | 0.13% | 22,141 | 8.08% | 273,870 |

== See also ==
- 1900 Tennessee gubernatorial election
- United States presidential elections in Tennessee
