= 1912 United States presidential election in Tennessee =

- November 5, 1912

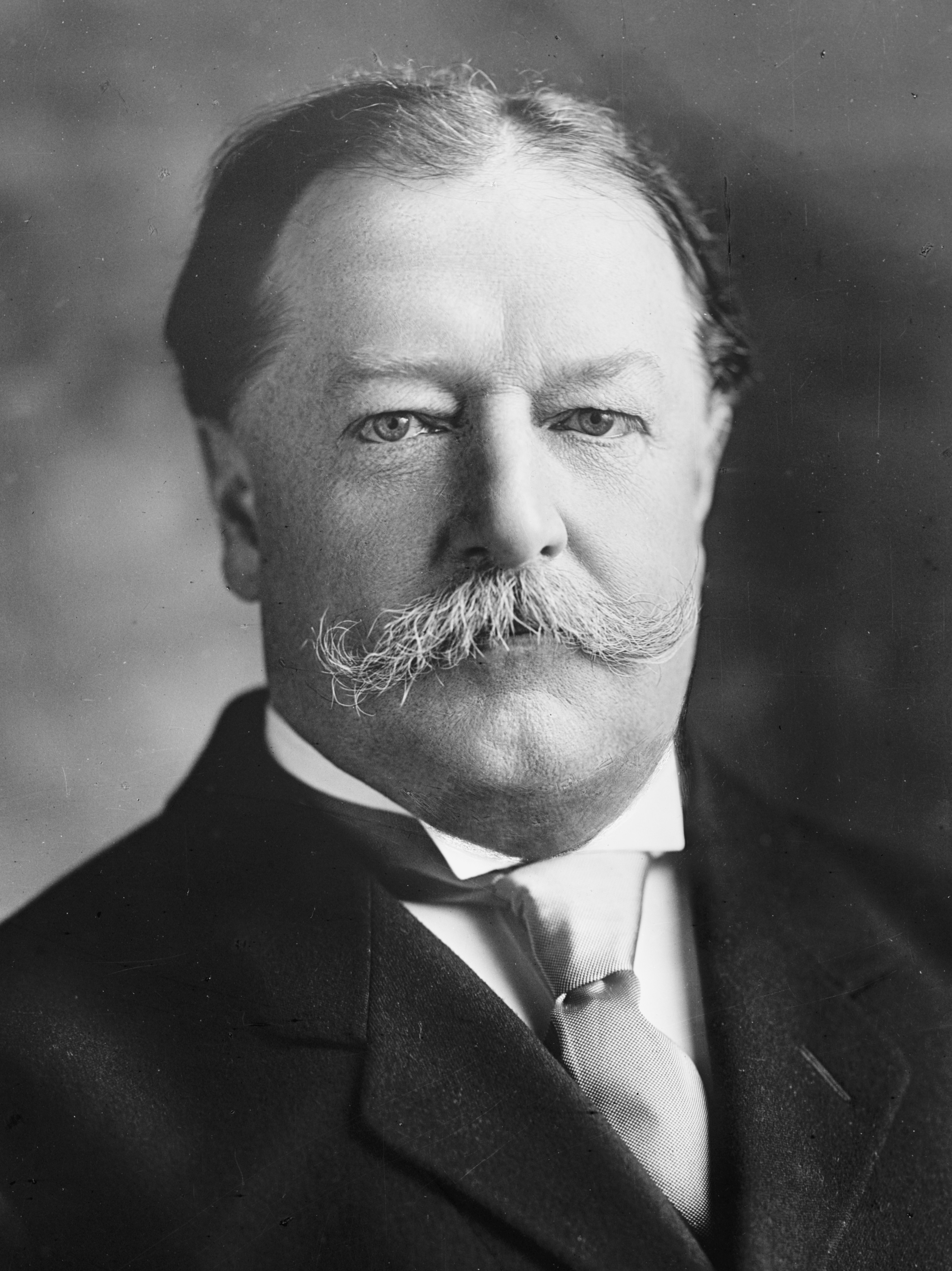

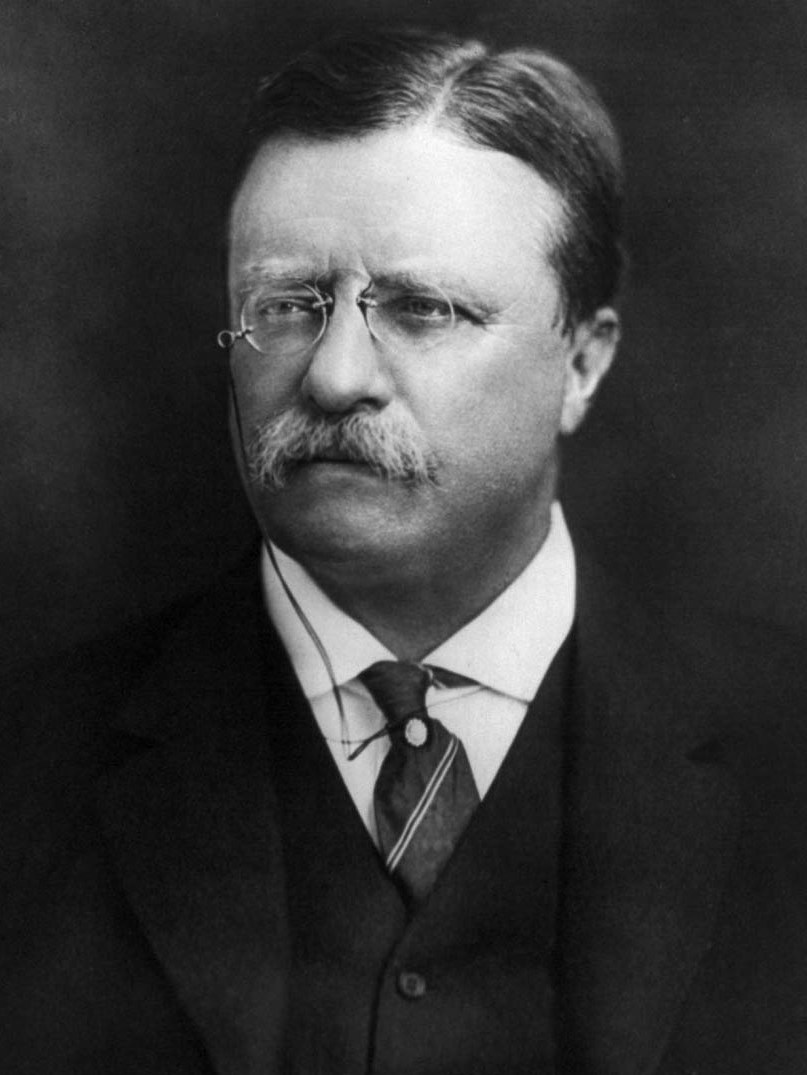
Nominee	Woodrow Wilson	William Howard Taft	Theodore Roosevelt
Party	Democratic	Republican	Progressive
Home state	New Jersey	Ohio	New York
Running mate	Thomas R. Marshall	Nicholas Murray Butler	Hiram Johnson
Electoral vote	12	0	0
Popular vote	133,021	60,475	54,041
Percentage	52.80%	24.00%	21.45%
County results
Wilson
30–40%
40–50%
50–60%
60–70%
70–80%
80–90%
Taft
30–40%
40–50%
50–60%
Roosevelt
30–40%
40–50%
50–60%
60–70%
70–80%
President before election
William Howard Taft
Republican
Elected President
Woodrow Wilson
Democratic

The 1912 United States presidential election in Tennessee took place on November 5, 1912, as part of the 1912 United States presidential election. Tennessee voters chose twelve representatives, or electors, to the Electoral College, who voted for president and vice president.

For over a century after the Civil War, Tennessee was divided according to political loyalties established in that war. Unionist regions covering almost all of East Tennessee, Kentucky Pennyroyal-allied Macon County, and the five West Tennessee Highland Rim counties of Carroll, Henderson, McNairy, Hardin and Wayne voted Republican – generally by landslide margins – as they saw the Democratic Party as the “war party” who had forced them into a war they did not wish to fight. Contrariwise, the rest of Middle and West Tennessee who had supported and driven the state's secession was equally fiercely Democratic as it associated the Republicans with Reconstruction. After the disfranchisement of the state's African-American population by a poll tax was largely complete in the 1890s, the Democratic Party was certain of winning statewide elections if united, although unlike the Deep South Republicans would almost always gain thirty to forty percent of the statewide vote from mountain and Highland Rim support.

In the early 1910s, the state Democratic Party was divided over the issue of prohibition. One faction, known as the “Independent Democrats,” wanted the state's Four Mile Law (which banned the sale of liquor within four miles of any school) to apply statewide, while the other faction, known as the “Regular Democrats,” wanted the state's larger cities to be exempt from this law. In 1910, the Independent Democrats fled the party and formed a coalition, known as the “Fusionists,” with Republicans, helping to elect Governor Ben W. Hooper, although the Republicans did not gain at other levels.

With the national Republican Party deeply split, divisions between the dominant eastern wing and the “black-and-tan” western wing of the state Republican Party were opened up as Theodore Roosevelt and governor of California Hiram Johnson planned “lily-whitism” for the South with the “Bull Moose” party after Roosevelt broke from the GOP. The “black-and-tan” wing being revitalised by Memphis banker and businessman Robert R. Church Jr. remained loyal to incumbent President William Howard Taft (R–Ohio), and running mate Columbia University President Nicholas Murray Butler, though it had many fewer votes due to disenfranchisement.

Pollsters always conceded Tennessee to Democratic nominees Princeton University President Woodrow Wilson and governor of Indiana Thomas R. Marshall.

== Results ==
1912 United States presidential election in Tennessee
Party	Candidate	Votes	Percentage	Electoral votes
Democratic	Woodrow Wilson	133,021	52.80%	12
Republican	William Howard Taft (incumbent)	60,475	24.00%	0
Progressive	Theodore Roosevelt	54,041	21.45%	0
Socialist	Eugene V. Debs	3,564	1.41%	0
Prohibition	Eugene W. Chafin	832 (Note: Prohibition votes were not separated by county but listed only as a statewide total.)	0.33%	0
Totals		251,933	100.00%	12

=== Results by county ===
1912 United States presidential election in Tennessee by county
County	Woodrow Wilson Democratic		William Howard Taft Republican		Theodore Roosevelt Progressive "Bull Moose"		Eugene V. Debs Socialist		Margin		Total votes cast
County	#	%	#	%	#	%	#	%	#	%	Total votes cast
Anderson	597	25.52%	539	23.04%	1,148	49.08%	55	2.35%	-551 (Note: In this county where Roosevelt ran ahead of Taft, margin given is Wilson vote minus Roosevelt vote and percentage margin Wilson percentage minus Roosevelt percentage.)	-23.56%	2,339
Bedford	2,305	59.39%	1,474	37.98%	96	2.47%	6	0.15%	831	21.41%	3,881
Benton	1,095	53.00%	652	31.56%	289	13.99%	30	1.45%	443	21.44%	2,066
Bledsoe	464	37.00%	379	30.22%	401	31.98%	10	0.80%	63	5.02%	1,254
Blount	836	26.83%	870	27.92%	1,410	45.25%	0	0.00%	-540 (Note: In this county where Wilson ran third behind both Taft and Roosevelt, margin given is Taft vote minus Roosevelt vote and percentage margin Taft percentage minus Roosevelt percentage.)	-17.33%	3,116
Bradley	645	38.21%	485	28.73%	548	32.46%	10	0.59%	97	5.75%	1,688
Campbell	554	26.37%	302	14.37%	1,193	56.78%	52	2.48%	-639	-30.41%	2,101
Cannon	1,184	63.32%	631	33.74%	48	2.57%	7	0.37%	553	29.57%	1,870
Carroll	1,653	40.80%	1,362	33.62%	967	23.87%	69	1.70%	291	7.18%	4,051
Carter	478	13.11%	1,243	34.08%	1,926	52.81%	0	0.00%	-683	-18.73%	3,647
Cheatham	1,096	70.30%	317	20.33%	123	7.89%	23	1.48%	779	49.97%	1,559
Chester	636	46.29%	312	22.71%	388	28.24%	38	2.77%	248	18.05%	1,374
Claiborne	903	34.61%	589	22.58%	1,098	42.09%	19	0.73%	-195	-7.47%	2,609
Clay	718	57.30%	440	35.12%	83	6.62%	12	0.96%	278	22.19%	1,253
Cocke	597	31.21%	757	39.57%	549	28.70%	10	0.52%	-160	-8.36%	1,913
Coffee	1,705	73.59%	521	22.49%	63	2.72%	28	1.21%	1,184	51.10%	2,317
Crockett	1,297	48.31%	852	31.73%	509	18.96%	27	1.01%	445	16.57%	2,685
Cumberland	489	37.44%	372	28.48%	434	33.23%	11	0.84%	55	4.21%	1,306
Davidson	9,517	76.25%	1,428	11.44%	1,330	10.66%	206	1.65%	8,089	64.81%	12,481
Decatur	758	45.42%	405	24.27%	491	29.42%	15	0.90%	267	16.00%	1,669
DeKalb	1,394	48.40%	1,219	42.33%	265	9.20%	2	0.07%	175	6.08%	2,880
Dickson	1,689	67.97%	448	18.03%	293	11.79%	55	2.21%	1,241	49.94%	2,485
Dyer	1,469	66.26%	318	14.34%	348	15.70%	82	3.70%	1,121	50.56%	2,217
Fayette	830	84.52%	59	6.01%	93	9.47%	0	0.00%	737	75.05%	982
Fentress	399	33.78%	444	37.60%	317	26.84%	21	1.78%	-45	-3.81%	1,181
Franklin	2,172	79.33%	370	13.51%	164	5.99%	32	1.17%	1,802	65.81%	2,738
Gibson	2,671	63.20%	1,002	23.71%	518	12.26%	35	0.83%	1,669	39.49%	4,226
Giles	3,081	60.44%	1,596	31.31%	419	8.22%	2	0.04%	1,485	29.13%	5,098
Grainger	841	33.88%	741	29.85%	900	36.26%	0	0.00%	-59	-2.38%	2,482
Greene	2,076	41.75%	1,650	33.18%	1,242	24.97%	5	0.10%	426	8.57%	4,973
Grundy	529	61.58%	122	14.20%	87	10.13%	121	14.09%	407	47.38%	859
Hamblen	722	48.39%	427	28.62%	325	21.78%	18	1.21%	295	19.77%	1,492
Hamilton	4,394	50.96%	1,493	17.32%	2,454	28.46%	281	3.26%	1,940	22.50%	8,622
Hancock	427	36.50%	659	56.32%	84	7.18%	0	0.00%	-232	-19.83%	1,170
Hardeman	1,323	69.09%	320	16.71%	264	13.79%	8	0.42%	1,003	52.38%	1,915
Hardin	738	31.85%	955	41.22%	592	25.55%	32	1.38%	-217	-9.37%	2,317
Hawkins	1,026	40.52%	828	32.70%	660	26.07%	18	0.71%	198	7.82%	2,532
Haywood	1,069	87.69%	34	2.79%	88	7.22%	28	2.30%	981	80.48%	1,219
Henderson	738	33.90%	473	21.73%	947	43.50%	19	0.87%	-209	-9.60%	2,177
Henry	2,526	65.44%	941	24.38%	282	7.31%	111	2.88%	1,585	41.06%	3,860
Hickman	1,288	56.49%	868	38.07%	111	4.87%	13	0.57%	420	18.42%	2,280
Houston	586	64.47%	172	18.92%	65	7.15%	86	9.46%	414	45.54%	909
Humphreys	1,283	69.54%	343	18.59%	189	10.24%	30	1.63%	940	50.95%	1,845
Jackson	1,344	57.49%	743	31.78%	251	10.74%	0	0.00%	601	25.71%	2,338
James	202	25.93%	169	21.69%	408	52.37%	0	0.00%	-206	-26.44%	779
Jefferson	514	25.66%	540	26.96%	940	46.93%	9	0.45%	-400	-19.97%	2,003
Johnson	256	11.56%	933	42.14%	1,025	46.30%	0	0.00%	-92	-4.16%	2,214
Knox	4,069	40.73%	1,984	19.86%	3,816	38.19%	122	1.22%	253	2.53%	9,991
Lake	499	75.04%	122	18.35%	31	4.66%	13	1.95%	377	56.69%	665
Lauderdale	1,020	55.83%	186	10.18%	593	32.46%	28	1.53%	427	23.37%	1,827
Lawrence	1,504	46.81%	878	27.33%	783	24.37%	48	1.49%	626	19.48%	3,213
Lewis	370	57.28%	126	19.50%	144	22.29%	6	0.93%	226	34.98%	646
Lincoln	2,651	77.27%	672	19.59%	98	2.86%	10	0.29%	1,979	57.68%	3,431
Loudon	415	38.04%	322	29.51%	348	31.90%	6	0.55%	67	6.14%	1,091
Macon	787	35.26%	1,251	56.05%	183	8.20%	11	0.49%	-464	-20.79%	2,232
Madison	2,702	65.36%	1,036	25.06%	316	7.64%	80	1.94%	1,666	40.30%	4,134
Marion	810	45.28%	463	25.88%	442	24.71%	74	4.14%	347	19.40%	1,789
Marshall	1,551	76.59%	376	18.57%	87	4.30%	11	0.54%	1,175	58.02%	2,025
Maury	2,309	68.70%	615	18.30%	389	11.57%	48	1.43%	1,694	50.40%	3,361
McMinn	912	42.36%	667	30.98%	557	25.87%	17	0.79%	245	11.38%	2,153
McNairy	1,155	41.67%	616	22.22%	1,001	36.11%	0	0.00%	154	5.56%	2,772
Meigs	517	50.79%	337	33.10%	163	16.01%	1	0.10%	180	17.68%	1,018
Monroe	1,136	48.63%	721	30.86%	475	20.33%	4	0.17%	415	17.77%	2,336
Montgomery	1,638	67.32%	514	21.13%	199	8.18%	82	3.37%	1,124	46.20%	2,433
Moore	694	84.43%	116	14.11%	11	1.34%	1	0.12%	578	70.32%	822
Morgan	466	28.17%	312	18.86%	841	50.85%	35	2.12%	-375	-22.67%	1,654
Obion	2,152	75.17%	455	15.89%	193	6.74%	63	2.20%	1,697	59.27%	2,863
Overton	1,531	60.73%	743	29.47%	181	7.18%	66	2.62%	788	31.26%	2,521
Perry	664	56.32%	379	32.15%	94	7.97%	42	3.56%	285	24.17%	1,179
Pickett	411	45.67%	355	39.44%	134	14.89%	0	0.00%	56	6.22%	900
Polk	867	42.69%	533	26.24%	622	30.63%	9	0.44%	245	12.06%	2,031
Putnam	1,867	58.69%	923	29.02%	386	12.13%	5	0.16%	944	29.68%	3,181
Rhea	692	45.38%	253	16.59%	552	36.20%	28	1.84%	140	9.18%	1,525
Roane	570	29.26%	482	24.74%	826	42.40%	70	3.59%	-256	-13.14%	1,948
Robertson	2,287	74.57%	513	16.73%	142	4.63%	125	4.08%	1,774	57.84%	3,067
Rutherford	3,406	68.57%	1,217	24.50%	280	5.64%	64	1.29%	2,189	44.07%	4,967
Scott	160	9.74%	123	7.49%	1,234	75.15%	125	7.61%	-1,074	-65.41%	1,642
Sequatchie	354	57.56%	139	22.60%	83	13.50%	39	6.34%	215	34.96%	615
Sevier	341	9.17%	967	26.00%	2,410	64.80%	1	0.03%	-1,443	-38.80%	3,719
Shelby	6,732	64.11%	589	5.61%	2,951	28.10%	228	2.17%	3,781	36.01%	10,500
Smith	1,863	62.90%	915	30.89%	184	6.21%	0	0.00%	948	32.01%	2,962
Stewart	1,312	64.06%	485	23.68%	54	2.64%	197	9.62%	827	40.38%	2,048
Sullivan	2,413	57.07%	538	12.72%	1,265	29.92%	12	0.28%	1,148	27.15%	4,228
Sumner	2,477	72.94%	769	22.64%	89	2.62%	61	1.80%	1,708	50.29%	3,396
Tipton	987	55.29%	564	31.60%	222	12.44%	12	0.67%	423	23.70%	1,785
Trousdale	544	68.86%	211	26.71%	35	4.43%	0	0.00%	333	42.15%	790
Unicoi	170	13.87%	280	22.84%	765	62.40%	11	0.90%	-485	-39.56%	1,226
Union	404	21.12%	307	16.05%	1,192	62.31%	10	0.52%	-788	-41.19%	1,913
Van Buren	225	58.44%	106	27.53%	30	7.79%	24	6.23%	119	30.91%	385
Warren	1,745	74.26%	339	14.43%	250	10.64%	16	0.68%	1,406	59.83%	2,350
Washington	1,531	35.89%	1,134	26.58%	1,592	37.32%	9	0.21%	-61	-1.43%	4,266
Wayne	435	24.10%	971	53.80%	390	21.61%	9	0.50%	-536	-29.70%	1,805
Weakley	2,810	63.03%	1,265	28.38%	350	7.85%	33	0.74%	1,545	34.66%	4,458
White	1,222	64.72%	330	17.48%	279	14.78%	57	3.02%	892	47.25%	1,888
Williamson	2,205	71.75%	797	25.94%	62	2.02%	9	0.29%	1,408	45.82%	3,073
Wilson	2,325	70.35%	682	20.64%	292	8.84%	6	0.18%	1,643	49.71%	3,305
Totals	133,021	52.71%	60,475	23.96%	54,041	21.41%	3,564	1.41%	72,546	28.75%	252,353

== Analysis ==
In the end Wilson achieved just under 53 percent of the popular vote, a figure very similar to that which Democrats had achieved in Tennessee over the previous four elections. Despite the appeal of Roosevelt's lily-white policy in the many emerging sundown towns or counties of East Tennessee, the “Bull Moose” candidate finished third in the state, 2.55 percentage points behind incumbent President Taft.

As of 2026, this is the last presidential election in which Hawkins County voted for a Democratic presidential candidate, as well as the last election in which Blount County, Washington County, Sevier County, Carter County, Jefferson County, Henderson County, Grainger County, Scott County, Unicoi County, and Johnson County did not vote for the Republican candidate.

== See also ==
- 1912 Tennessee gubernatorial election
- United States presidential elections in Tennessee
