= 1912 Tennessee gubernatorial election =

- November 5, 1912
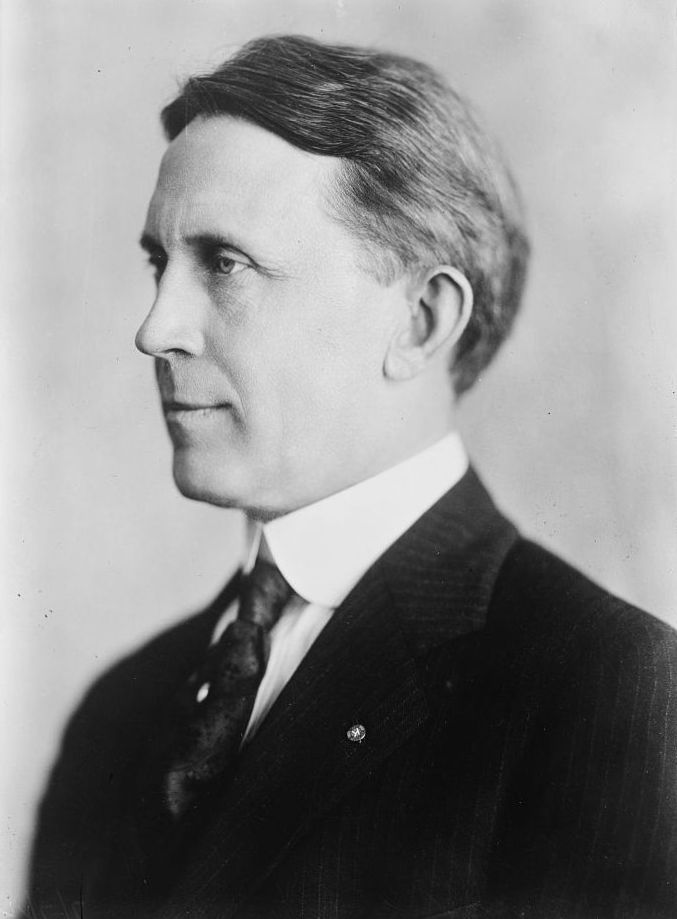

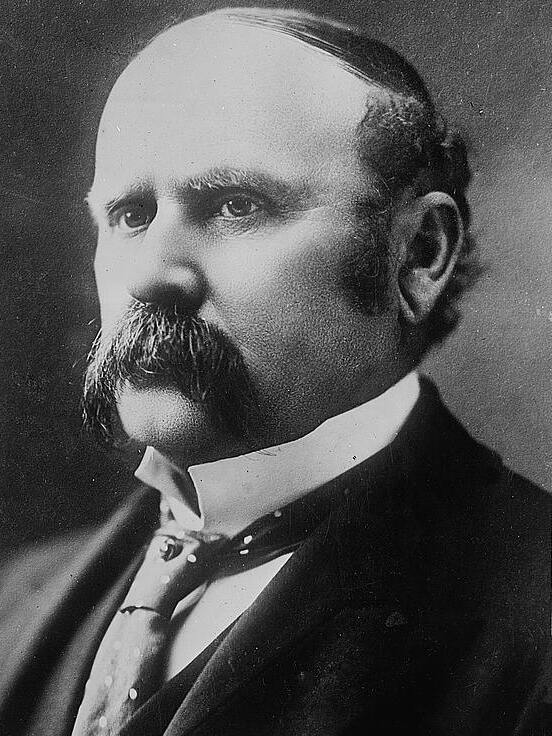
Nominee	Ben W. Hooper	Benton McMillin
Party	Republican	Democratic
Popular vote	124,641	116,610
Percentage	50.10%	46.87%
- County results Hooper: 40–50% 50–60% 60–70% 70–80% 80–90% McMillin: 40–50% 50–60% 60–70% 70–80% 80–90%
Governor before election
Ben W. Hooper
Republican
Elected Governor
Ben W. Hooper
Republican

The 1912 Tennessee gubernatorial election was held on November 5, 1912. Incumbent Republican governor Ben W. Hooper defeated former Democratic governor Benton McMillin with 50.10% of the vote.

== Background ==
State Republicans were divided between supporters of William Howard Taft and Theodore Roosevelt, with the latter's supporters, led by John Chiles Houk, breaking from the party and nominating William Poston for governor on a Progressive ticket. State Democrats also remained divided, with Regular Democrats nominating former governor Benton McMillin, and Independent Democrats supporting Hooper and the Fusion ticket. On election day, Hooper won with 124,641 votes to 116,610 for McMillin, and 4,483 for Poston.

== General election ==
=== Candidates ===
- Ben W. Hooper, Republican
- Benton McMillin, Democratic
- William F. Poston, Progressive
- C.G. Harold, Socialist

=== Results ===
1912 Tennessee gubernatorial election
Party	Candidate	Votes	%	±%
Republican	Ben W. Hooper (incumbent)	124,641	50.10%	
Democratic	Benton McMillin	116,610	46.87%	
Progressive	William F. Poston	4,483	1.80%	
Socialist	C.G. Harold	3,053	1.23%	
Majority		8,031	3.23%	
Turnout				
Republican hold		Swing		

== See also ==
- 1912 United States presidential election in Tennessee
