= James County Courthouse =

- U.S. National Register of Historic Places
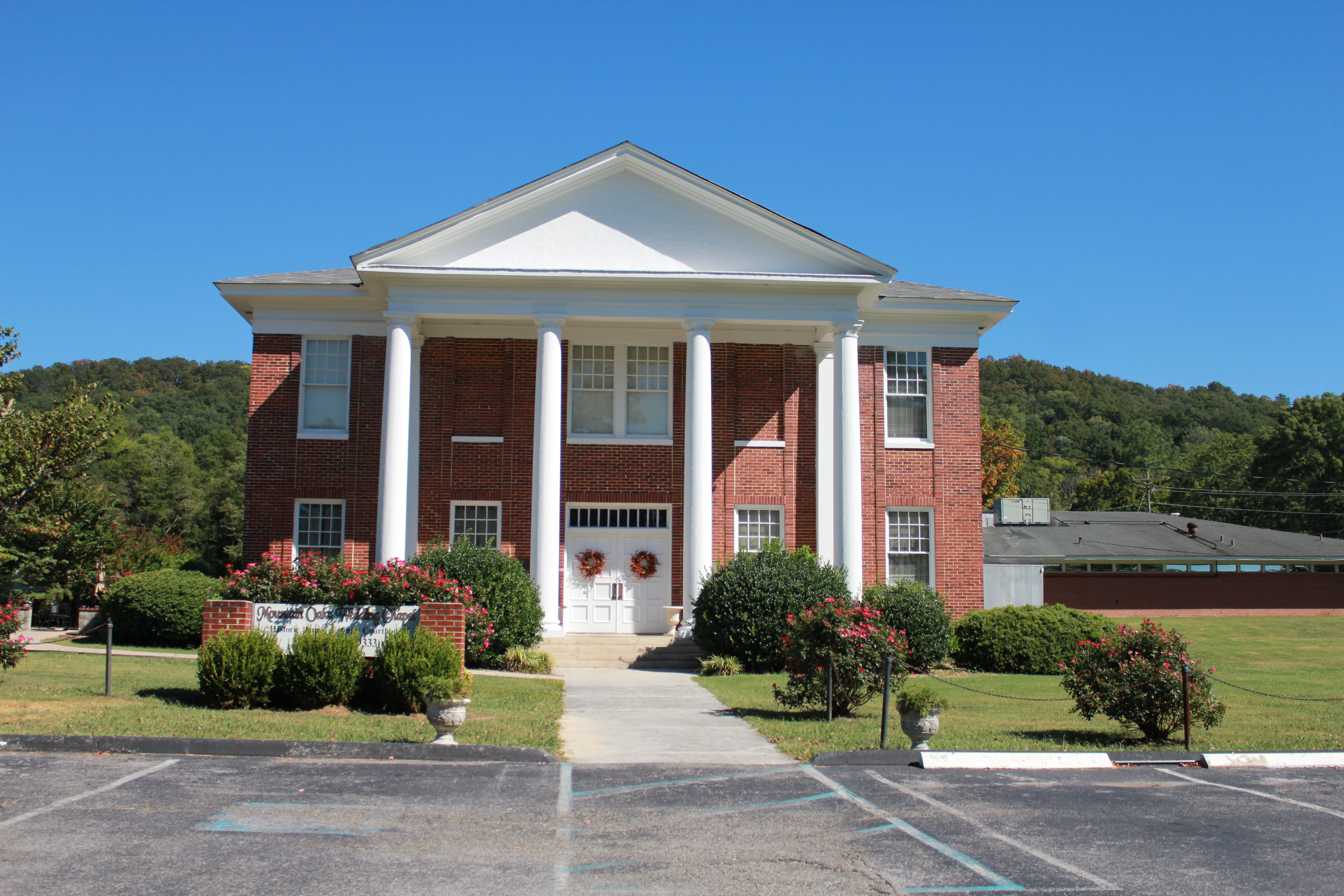
- James County Courthouse in 2010
- Location: Ooltewah, Tennessee
- Coordinates: 35°4.300′N 85°3.621′W
- Built: 1913
- NRHP reference No.: 76001782

The James County Courthouse is a historic building located in Ooltewah, Tennessee. It was built in 1913 as the third courthouse of the now defunct James County. It continued to function in that capacity until 1919, when James County went bankrupt and was absorbed by Hamilton County. In 1976, the building was listed on the National Register of Historic Places. The building was privately purchased in 2000 and is used as the Mountain Oaks Wedding Chapel.

== Gallery ==
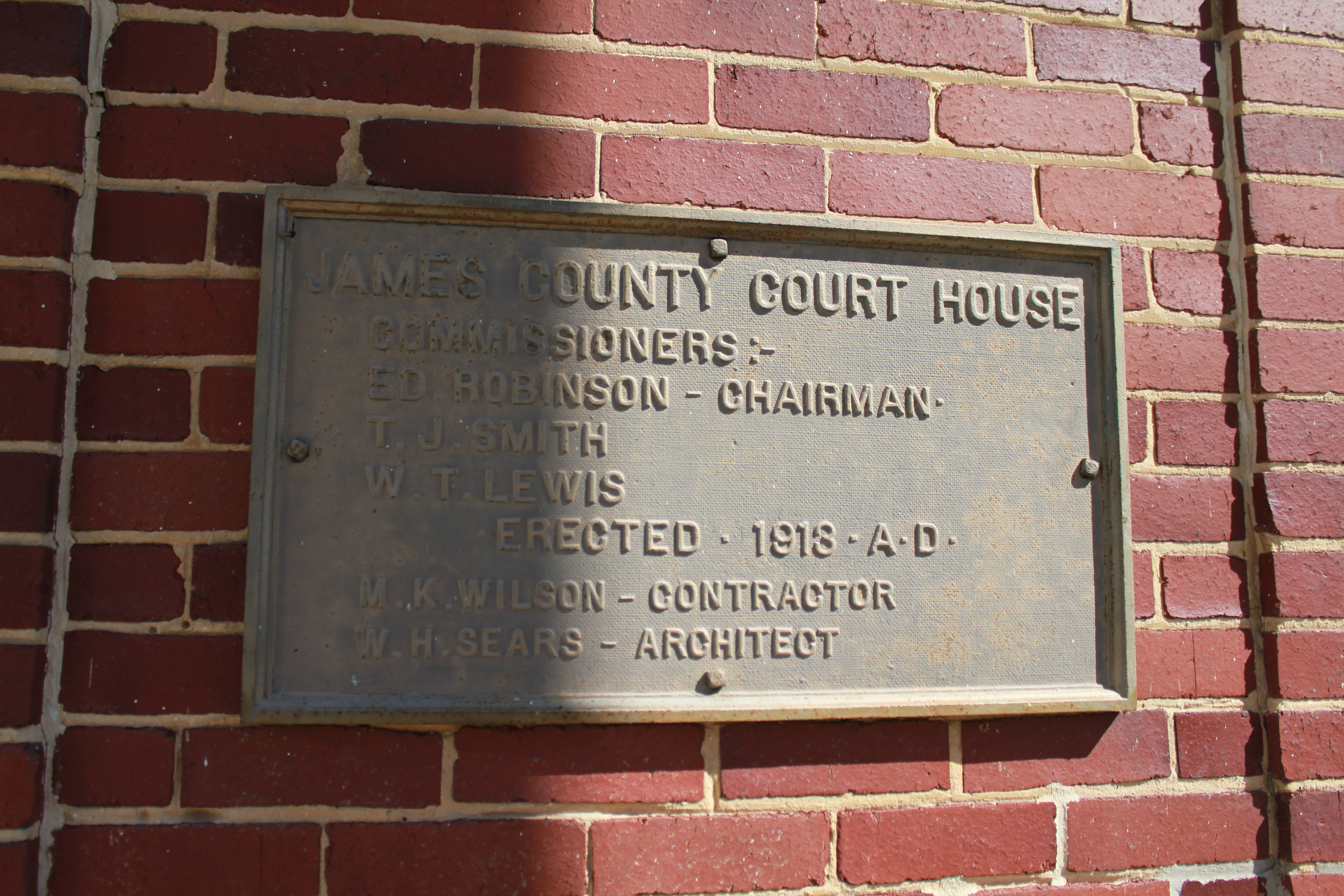

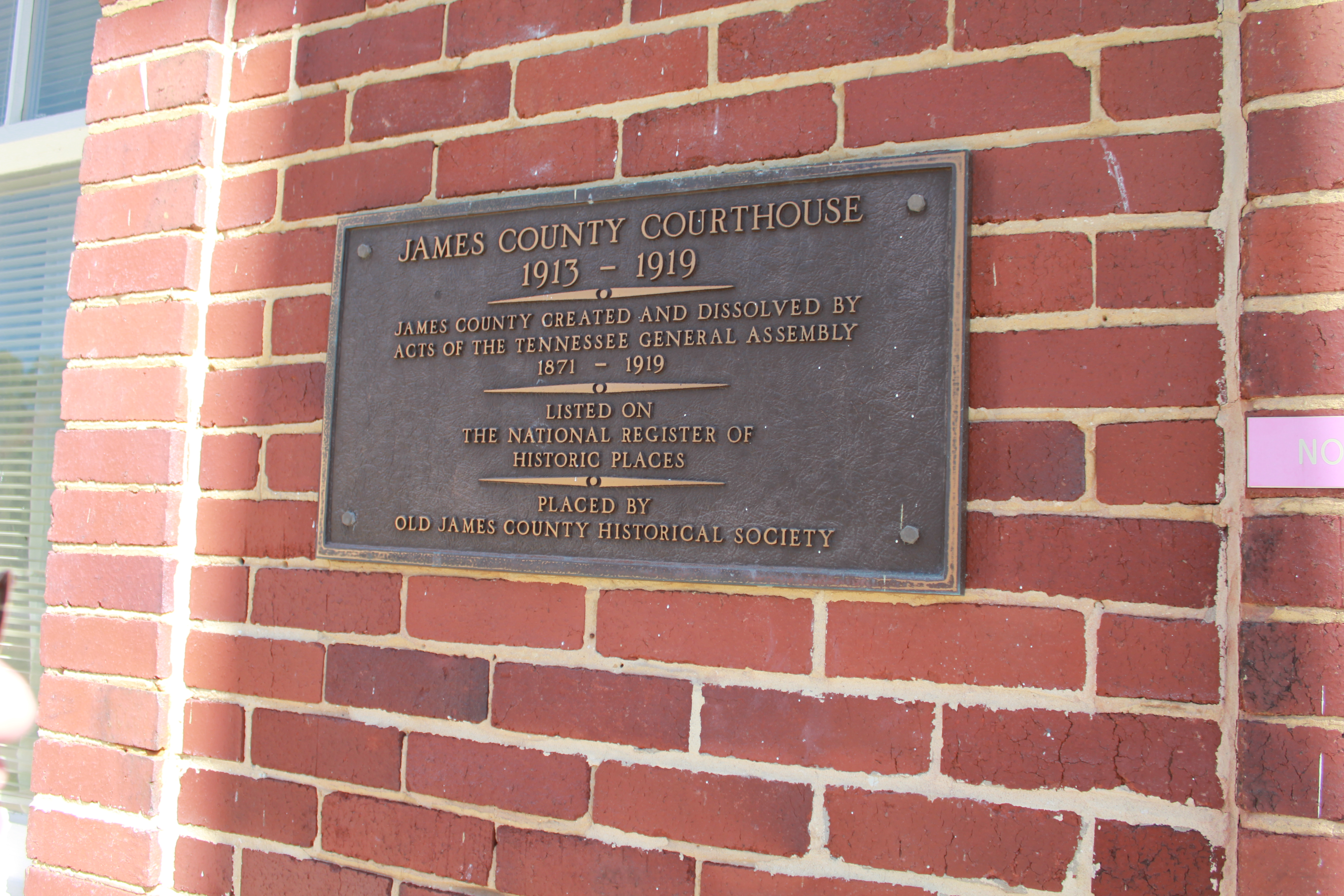

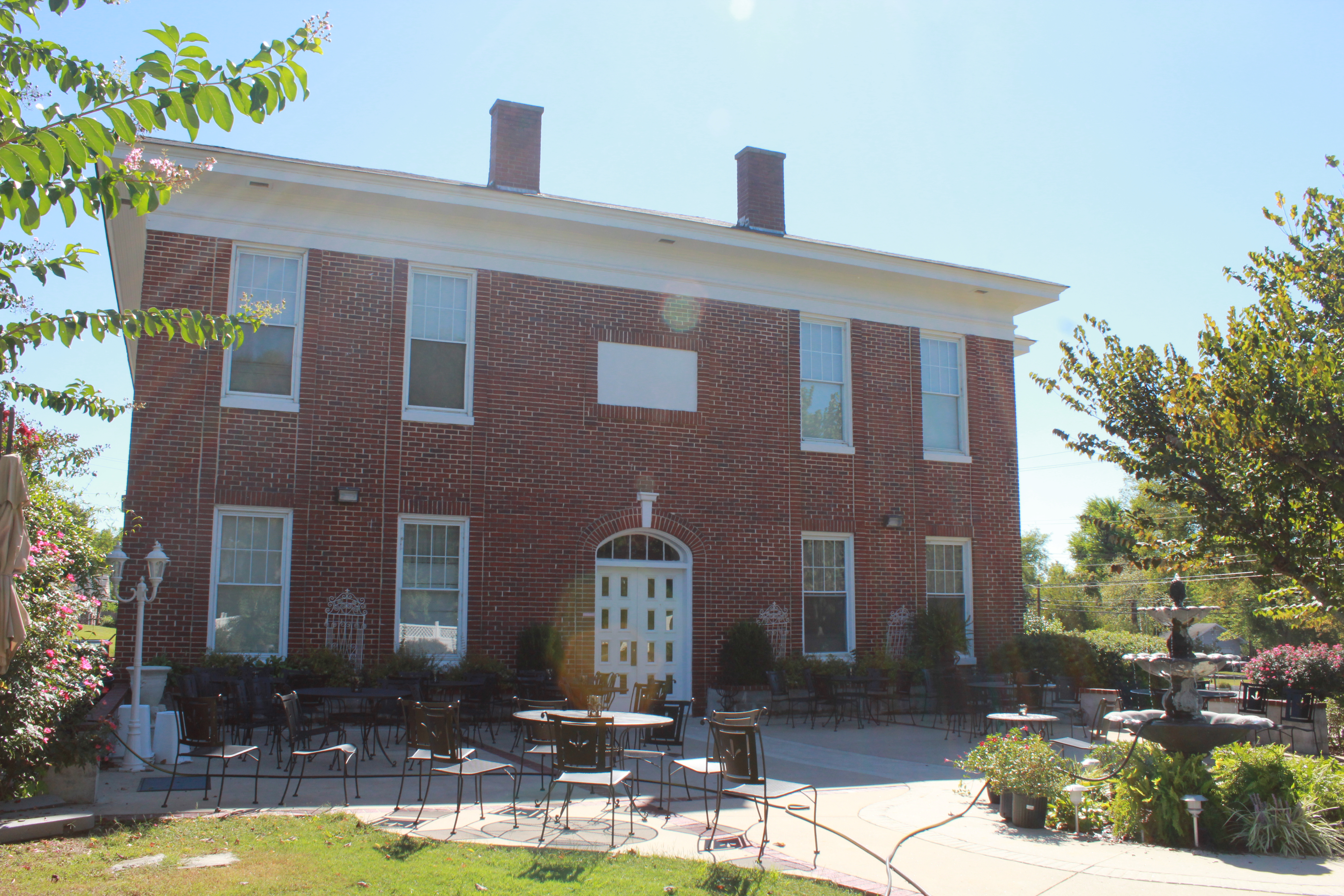
