= 1898 Tennessee gubernatorial election =

- November 8, 1898
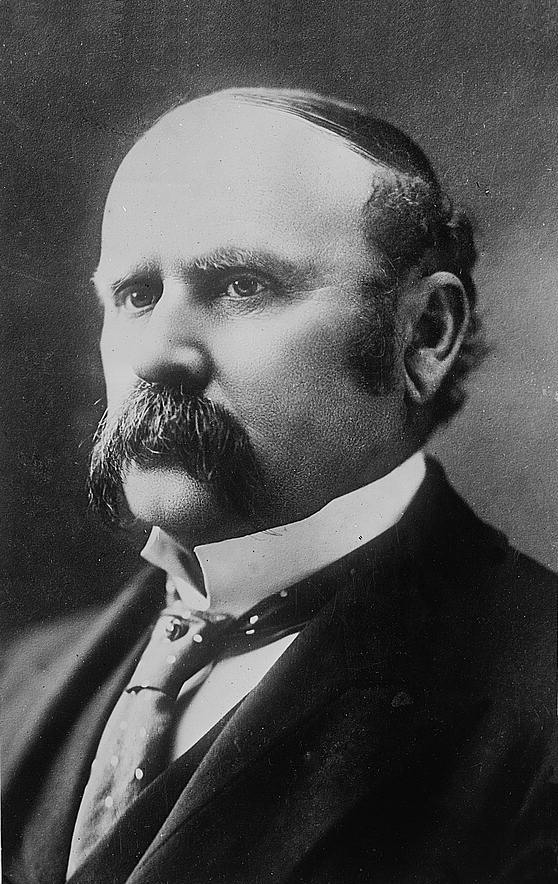

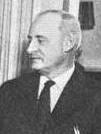
Nominee	Benton McMillin	James Alexander Fowler
Party	Democratic	Republican
Popular vote	105,640	72,611
Percentage	57.92%	39.81%
- County results McMillin: 50–60% 60–70% 70–80% 80–90% >90% Fowler: 40–50% 50–60% 60–70% 70–80% 80–90%
Governor before election
Robert Love Taylor
Democratic
Elected Governor
Benton McMillin
Democratic

The 1898 Tennessee gubernatorial election was held on November 8, 1898. Incumbent Democratic governor Robert Love Taylor did not seek re-election. Democratic nominee Benton McMillin defeated Republican nominee James Alexander Fowler with 57.92% of the vote.

== Background ==
In 1897, McMillin sought the U.S. Senate seat left vacant by the death of Isham G. Harris. Failing to garner any support, he then sought and successfully obtained the Democratic nomination for governor the following year in the race to succeed the popular governor Robert Love Taylor. McMillin won by a large margin on election day, with 105,640 votes to 72,611 for Republican candidate James Alexander Fowler, 2,428 for Populist candidate W.D. Turley, and 1,722 for Prohibition candidate R.N. Richardson.

== General election ==
=== Candidates ===
Major party candidates

- Benton McMillin, Democratic
- James Alexander Fowler, Republican

Other candidates

- W. D. Turnley, People's
- R. N. Richardson, Prohibition

=== Results ===
1898 Tennessee gubernatorial election
Party	Candidate	Votes	%	±%
Democratic	Benton McMillin	105,640	57.92%	
Republican	James Alexander Fowler	72,611	39.81%	
Populist	W. D. Turnley	2,428	1.33%	
Prohibition	R. N. Richardson	1,722	0.94%	
Majority		33,029		
Turnout				
Democratic hold		Swing		
