= Ooltewah High School =

Public high school in Hamilton County, Tennessee, United States

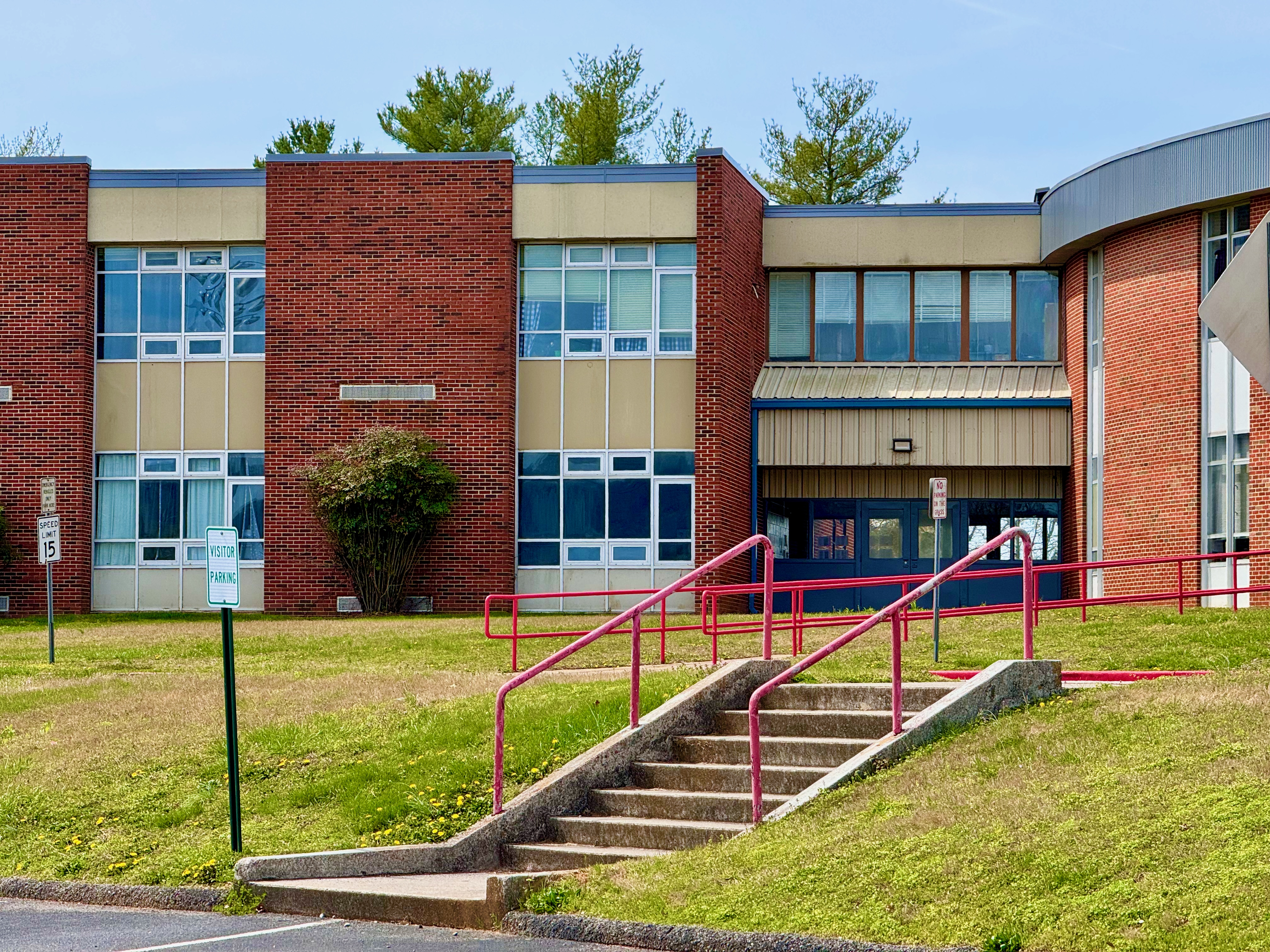

Location
- 6123 Mountain View Road, Ooltewah, Tennessee, 37363; 35.0935°N 85.0628°W

Information
- Type: Public
- Established: 1907
- School district: Hamilton County Schools
- Principal: Donald Mullins
- Teaching staff: 75.89 (FTE)
- Grades: 9-12
- Enrollment: 1,275 (2023–2024)
- Student to teacher ratio: 16.80
- Colors: Red; Siver
- Team name: Owls
- Feeder schools: Hunter Middle School Ooltewah Middle School
- Website: ohs.hcde.org

Ooltewah High School (OHS) is a public high school located in Ooltewah, Tennessee, near Chattanooga. It is part of the Hamilton County Schools system.

== Academics ==
Ooltewah High School offers advanced placement (AP) courses.

== Athletics ==
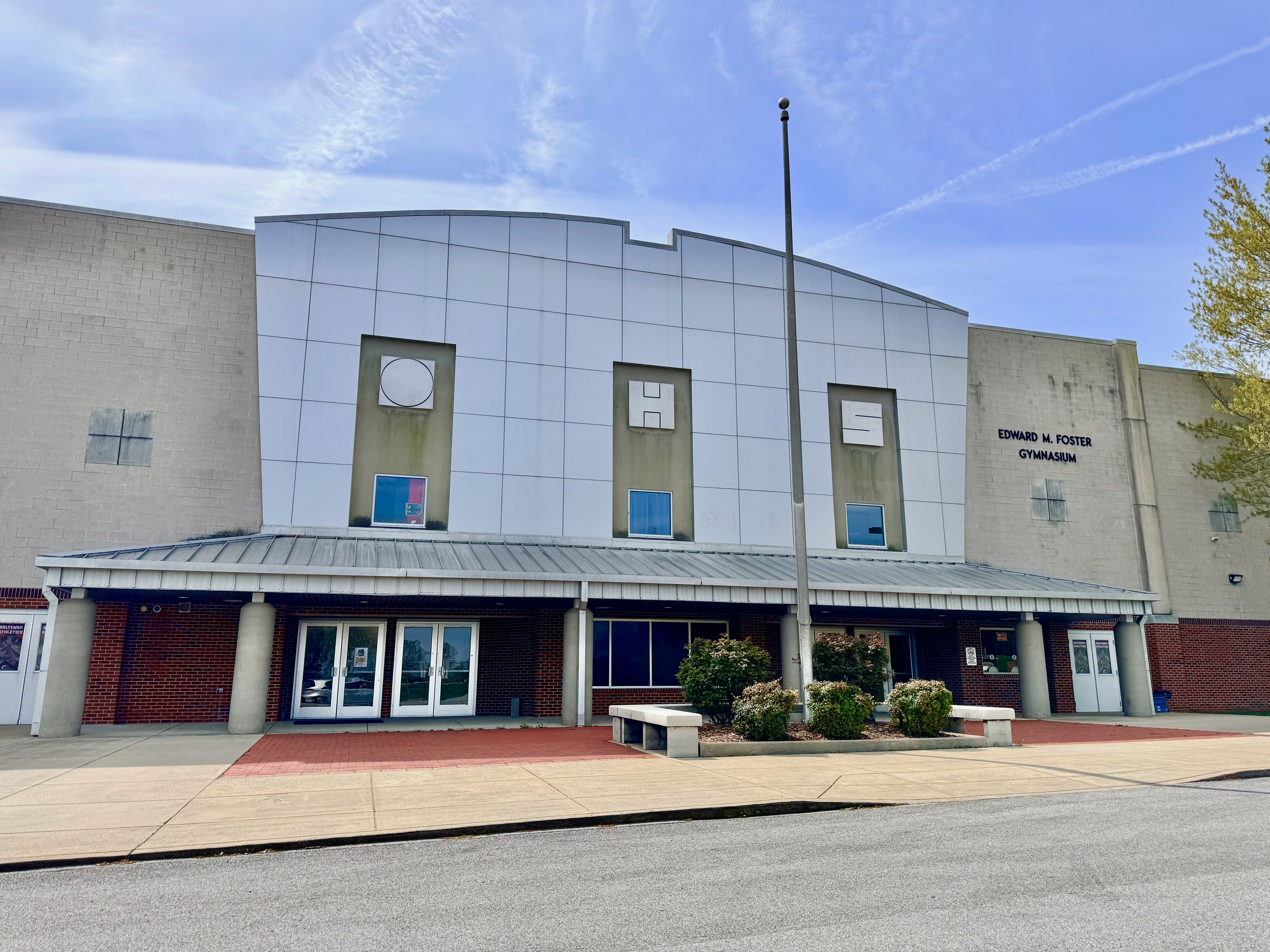
Edward M. Foster Gymnasium

The school competes in the Tennessee Secondary School Athletic Association (TSSAA). Its mascot is the Owl. Sports include baseball, basketball, football, girls' golf, soccer, ultimate frisbee, softball, tennis, track and field, volleyball, lacrosse and wrestling.

=== State championships ===
- Girls' basketball - 1975.
- Softball - 1982, 1990, 1992, 2008.
- Boys' track and field - 1984, 1992, 1996, 1997, 2008, 2009.
- Girls' track and field - 1991, 1992, 1999.
- Wrestling - 2007, 2008, 2009.

== Notable alumni ==
- Maci Bookout
- Sammy Seamster, former Middle Tennessee State University & NFL cornerback
- Jacques Smith, former University of Tennessee & NFL defensive end & linebacker

== 2015 incident ==
In December 2015, several members of the basketball team arrived in Gatlinburg, Tennessee for a tournament, and several older players sexually assaulted four freshman players. The following January, the school's basketball season was cancelled, and in August 2016, all three defendants were found guilty of aggravated rape and assault. The event made national news.
