= Jacques Smith =

American football player (born 1991)

Profile
- Position: Defensive end

Personal information
- Born: December 31, 1991 (age 34); Chattanooga, Tennessee, U.S.
- Listed height: 6 ft 2 in (1.88 m)
- Listed weight: 258 lb (117 kg)

Career information
- High school: Ooltewah (TN)
- College: Tennessee
- NFL draft: 2014: undrafted

Career history
- Atlanta Falcons (2014–2015)*
- * Offseason or practice squad member only
- Stats at Pro Football Reference

Jacques Smith (born December 31, 1991) is an American former professional football defensive end and linebacker. He played college football at the University of Tennessee from 2010 to 2013, was a member of the Atlanta Falcons' practice squad in 2014.

== Early life ==
Smith was born in Chattanooga, Tennessee and grew up in Ooltewah, Tennessee. He attended Ooltewah High School and was ranked as the No. 6 weakside defensive end by Rivals.com and the No. 1 prospect in Tennessee by some publications, including the Knoxville News Sentinel He was selected by USA Today as a first-team player on its All-USA high school football team.

== College career ==
Jacques Smith played for the Volunteers 2010–2013 under head coaches Derek Dooley and Butch Jones. Smith achieved Freshman-All SEC honors. In the 2013 season, he had a 18-yard interception return for a touchdown against Auburn.

== Professional career ==
Smith was signed by the Atlanta Falcons as an undrafted free agent in May 2014, He played for the Falcons' practice squad during the 2014 NFL season. On May 1, 2015, Smith was waived by the Falcons.
