= 1900 Tennessee gubernatorial election =

- November 6, 1900
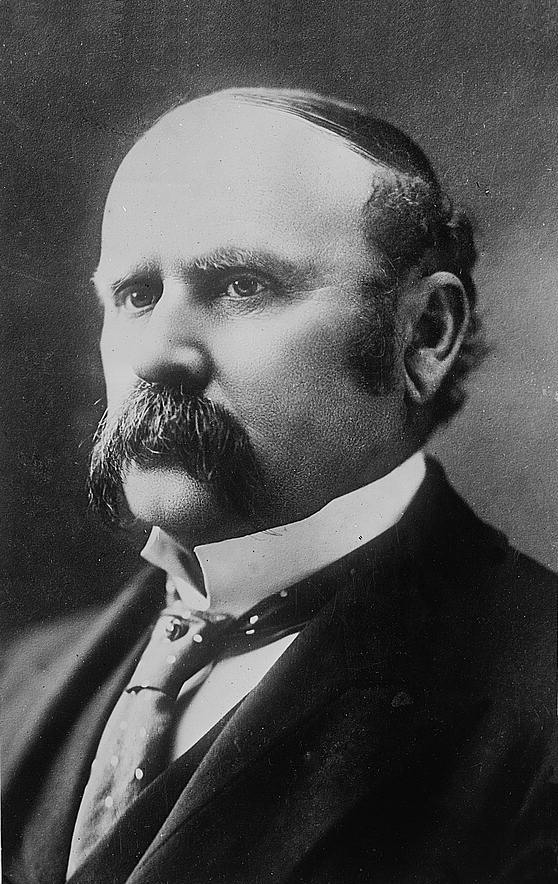

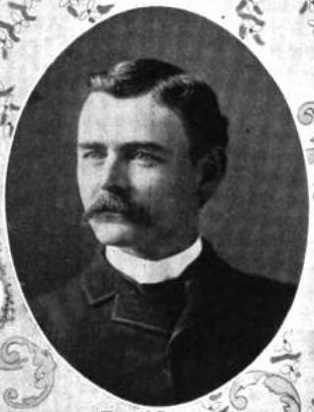
Nominee	Benton McMillin	John E. McCall
Party	Democratic	Republican
Popular vote	145,708	119,831
Percentage	53.86%	44.29%
- County results McMillin: 50–60% 60–70% 70–80% 80–90% >90% McCall: 50–60% 60–70% 70–80% 80–90% >90%
Governor before election
Benton McMillin
Democratic
Elected Governor
Benton McMillin
Democratic

The 1900 Tennessee gubernatorial election was held on November 6, 1900. Incumbent Democratic governor Benton McMillin defeated Republican nominee John E. McCall with 53.86% of the vote.

== Background ==
The state's Republican Party had come under the control of Congressman Walter P. Brownlow. Seeking to unseat McMillin, Brownlow and his faction nominated Representative John E. McCall as the party's candidate for governor. While the party ran a strong campaign, McMillin was easily re-elected by winning 145,708 votes to 119,831 for McCall.

== General election ==
=== Candidates ===
Major party candidates

- Benton McMillin, Democratic
- John E. McCall, Republican

Other candidates

- R. S. Cheves, Prohibition
- H. J. Mullens, People's
- Charles H. Stockwell, Social Democratic

=== Results ===
1900 Tennessee gubernatorial election
Party	Candidate	Votes	%	±%
Democratic	Benton McMillin (incumbent)	145,708	53.86%	
Republican	John E. McCall	119,831	44.29%	
Prohibition	R. S. Cheves	3,457	1.28%	
Populist	H. J. Mullens	1,273	0.47%	
Social Democratic	Charles H. Stockwell	264	0.10%	
Majority		25,877		
Turnout				
Democratic hold		Swing		

== See also ==
- 1900 United States presidential election in Tennessee
