= Eli Shelby Hammond =

American judge

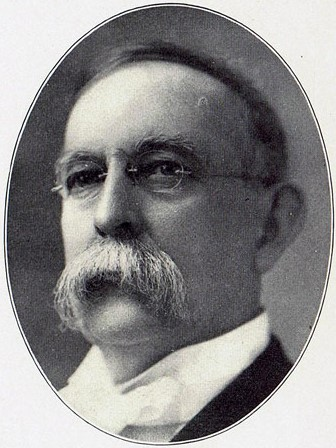

Judge of the United States District Court for the Western District of Tennessee
- In office June 17, 1878 – December 17, 1904
- Appointed by: Rutherford B. Hayes
- Preceded by: Seat established by 20 Stat. 132
- Succeeded by: John E. McCall

Personal details
- Born: Eli Shelby Hammond; April 1, 1838 Brandon, Mississippi
- Died: December 17, 1904 (aged 66) New York City, New York
- Education: Union University; Cumberland School of Law

Eli Shelby Hammond (April 1, 1838 – December 17, 1904) was a United States district judge of the United States District Court for the Western District of Tennessee.

== Education and career ==
Born in Brandon, Mississippi, Hammond graduated from Union University in Murfreesboro, Tennessee in 1857, and from Cumberland School of Law in 1858. He was in private practice in Ripley, Mississippi from 1859 to 1860, and in Memphis, Tennessee from 1860 to 1861. He was a captain in the Confederate States Army from 1861 to 1865, thereafter returning to private practice in Ripley until 1868, and then in Memphis until 1878.

== Federal judicial service ==
On June 15, 1878, Hammond was nominated by President Rutherford B. Hayes to a new seat on the United States District Court for the Western District of Tennessee created by 20 Stat. 132. He was confirmed by the United States Senate on June 17, 1878, and received his commission the same day. Hammond served in that capacity until his death on December 17, 1904, in New York City, New York.

== Sources ==
Legal offices
Preceded by Seat established by 20 Stat. 132	Judge of the United States District Court for the Western District of Tennessee; 1878–1904	Succeeded by John E. McCall
