= Ooltewah, Tennessee =

- Unincorporated community
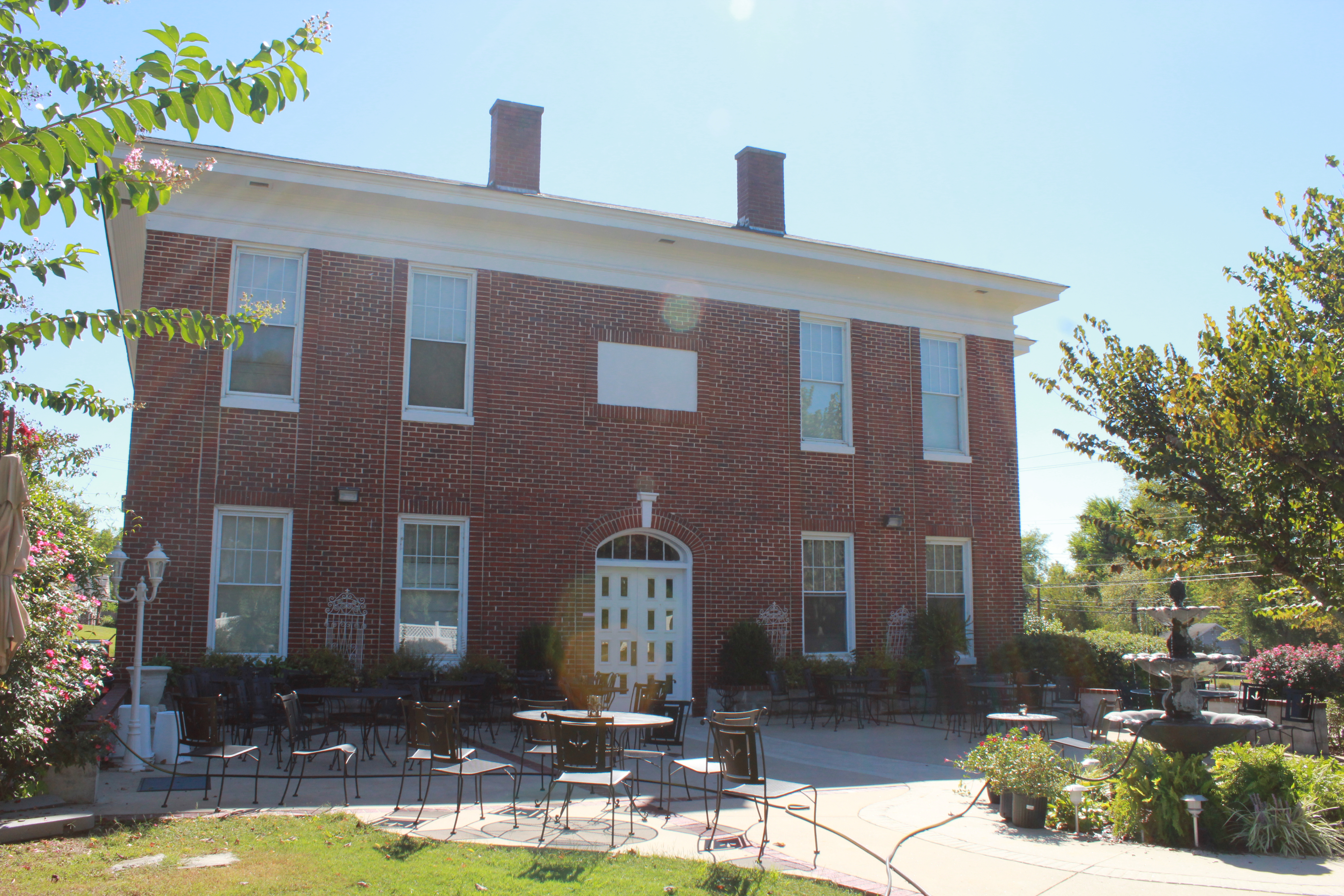

- Location within Tennessee Location within the United States
- Coordinates: 35°4′1″N 85°4′53″W
- Country: United States
- State: Tennessee
- County: Hamilton

Area
  - Total: 0.62 sq mi (1.60 km^{2})
  - Land: 0.62 sq mi (1.60 km^{2})
  - Water: 0 sq mi (0.00 km^{2})
- Elevation: 761 ft (232 m)

Population (2020)
  - Total: 684
  - Density: 1,106.5/sq mi (427.21/km^{2})
- Time zone: UTC-5 (Eastern (EST))
  - Summer (DST): UTC-4 (EDT)
- ZIP code: 37363
- Area code: 423
- FIPS code: 47-55900
- GNIS feature ID: 1296442

Ooltewah (/ˈuːtəwɑː/ OO-tuh-wah) is an unincorporated community in Hamilton County, Tennessee, United States. The population was 684 at the 2020 census. Ooltewah is an enclave in the city of Collegedale, near Chattanooga.

== History ==
Ooltewah was the county seat of James County, a former Tennessee county that went bankrupt in 1919 and was subsequently incorporated into Hamilton County. The former James County Courthouse located in the square in downtown Ooltewah is the community's major landmark. It is listed on the National Register of Historic Places.

Alfred Cate (1822–1871), a resident of Ooltewah, was a prominent Southern Unionist and leader in the East Tennessee bridge-burning conspiracy. Cate and his men destroyed three Chattanooga-area railroad bridges on the night of November 8, 1861, in hopes of paving the way for a Union invasion of East Tennessee.

On November 24, 1863, the 4th Michigan Cavalry entered Ooltewah and captured seventeen Confederates, including two officers, and destroyed a train of four wagons. On the next day, the 4th Michigan Cavalry destroyed the Ooltewah railroad bridge, burned 4,000 pounds of flour, and captured a Confederate Lieutenant Colonel before moving on to Cleveland before nightfall.

== Geography ==
Ooltewah is located at 35°4′1″N 85°4′53″W (35.066834, -85.081421).

According to the United States Census Bureau, the CDP has a total area of 0.9 square miles (2.3 km^{2}), all land.

== Name ==
The word Ooltewah is possibly derived from ultiwa, a Cherokee cognate of the Muscogee word italwa, meaning "principal ground." Alternatively, it is perhaps derived from the Creek (Muscogee) words uwv-tawa (OO-U-TA-WA), meaning "water town." Locals attribute the name as translated "Owls Nest" or "Owls Roost" (CREEK - Opv-tawa OH-POO-TA-WA).

== Demographics ==
Historical population
Census	Pop.	Note	%±
2020	684		—
U.S. Decennial Census

=== 2020 census ===
Ooltewah racial composition
Race	Number	Percentage
White (non-Hispanic)	521	76.17%
Black or African American (non-Hispanic)	46	6.73%
Asian	12	0.88%
Other/Mixed	54	7.89%
Hispanic or Latino	57	8.33%

As of the 2020 United States census, there were 684 people, 337 households, and 195 families residing in the CDP.

=== 2010 census ===
As of the census of 2010, there were 687 people, 313 households, and 194 families residing in the CDP. The population density was 741.5 inhabitants per square mile (286.3/km^{2}). There were 2,290 housing units at an average density of 298.9 per square mile (115.4/km^{2}). The racial makeup of the CDP was 83.49% White, 11.93% Asian, 0.46% Native American, 0.84% African-American, 0.02% Pacific Islander, 1.13% from other races, and 2.13% from two or more races. Hispanic or Latino of any race were 1.94% of the population.

There were 2,153 households, out of which 32.7% had children under the age of 18 living with them, 59.6% were married couples living together, 11.6% had a female householder with no husband present, and 24.8% were non-families. 20.3% of all households were made up of individuals, and 5.3% had someone living alone who was 65 years of age or older. The average household size was 2.62 and the average family size was 3.04.

In the CDP, the population was spread out, with 25.2% under the age of 18, 8.8% from 18 to 24, 30.4% from 25 to 44, 25.9% from 45 to 64, and 9.7% who were 65 years of age or older. The median age was 36 years. For every 100 females, there were 97.8 males. For every 100 females age 18 and over, there were 94.0 males.

The median income for a household in the Ooltewah CDP was $92,243, and the median income for a family was $105,439. Males had a median income of $82,423 versus $61,036 for females. The per capita income for the CDP was $51,034. About 2.6% of families and 5.6% of the population were below the poverty line, including 9.0% of those under age 18 and 7.8% of those age 65 or over.

== Education ==
The Ooltewah zip code is the site of Ooltewah High School, East Hamilton Middle/High School, Ooltewah Middle School, Hunter Middle School, Ooltewah Elementary School, Snow Hill Elementary School, Wolftever Creek Elementary School, and Wallace A. Smith Elementary School.

East Hamilton Middle/High School split from Ooltewah High School due to a large student body. East Hamilton Middle/High School competes in Division 4A of the TSSAA, while Ooltewah competes in Division 5A of the TSSAA.

== Notable people ==
- Mike Carter, Tennessee state legislator, lived in Ooltewah
- Chuck Fleischmann, U.S. representative, lives in Ooletwah
- Luther Roy, Major League Baseball pitcher, was born in Ooltewah
- Sammy Seamster, NFL player, was born in Ooltewah
- Jacques Smith, NFL player, was raised in Ooltewah
