= Sammy Seamster =

American football player (born 1991)

No. 37, 44
- Position: Cornerback

Personal information
- Born: February 5, 1991 (age 35); Ooltewah, Tennessee, U.S.
- Listed height: 6 ft 0 in (1.83 m)
- Listed weight: 205 lb (93 kg)

Career information
- High school: Ooltewah
- College: Middle Tennessee State
- NFL draft: 2014: undrafted

Career history
- Baltimore Ravens (2014)*; Miami Dolphins (2014); New Orleans Saints (2015); Buffalo Bills (2015); Dallas Cowboys (2016–2017)*; Buffalo Bills (2017)*; Jacksonville Jaguars (2017–2018)*
- * Offseason or practice squad member only

Career NFL statistics
- Games played: 3
- Stats at Pro Football Reference

Samuel Tyrone Seamster (born February 5, 1991) is an American former professional football player who was a cornerback in the National Football League for the Miami Dolphins, New Orleans Saints, Dallas Cowboys, Buffalo Bills, and Jacksonville Jaguars. He was signed by the Baltimore Ravens as an undrafted free agent in 2014. He played college football for the Middle Tennessee Blue Raiders.

== Early life ==
Seamster attended Ooltewah High School. As a freshman, he began playing the sport of American football. As a senior, he tallied 53 tackles (2 for loss), 6 interceptions (led the team), 27 passes defensed (led the team), one forced fumble and 3 receptions on offense. He received All-region and Class 5A All-state honors.

He also competed in basketball and track. He contributed to the school winning the state track title his junior year.

== College career ==
Seamster accepted a football scholarship from Middle Tennessee State University. As a true freshman, he appeared in seven games as a backup, before suffering a season ending knee injury against Florida Atlantic University. He collected 6 tackles (one for loss), one special teams tackle and one forced fumble.

In 2010, he was redshirted. As a sophomore in 2011, he appeared in all 12 games with 2 starts at cornerback. He totaled 10 defensive tackles and 3 special teams tackles. He had his first start against the University of Tennessee, making 2 tackles.

As a junior, he was switched to safety, appearing in all 12 games with 2 starts. He registered 17 tackles (2 for loss) and one forced fumble. He had 7 tackles (2 for loss) and one forced fumble against Troy University.

As a senior, he appeared in all 13 games with 6 starts at cornerback, posting 33 tackles (22 solo) and his first-career interception. He also added one pass defensed, 2 forced fumbles and 2 fumble recoveries. He made 6 tackles against East Carolina University. He had 5 tackles and one forced fumble against Florida International University. He was named the team's 2013 Lifter of the Year and was invited to participate in the NFLPA Collegiate Bowl.

He finished his college career after appearing in 44 games (10 starts), 69 tackles (50 solo), 3 tackles for loss (-13 yards), one interception, one pass defensed, 4 forced fumbles and 2 fumble recoveries.

== Professional career ==
=== Baltimore Ravens ===
Seamster was signed as an undrafted free agent by the Baltimore Ravens after the 2014 NFL draft on May 12, 2014. He was waived on August 30.

=== Miami Dolphins ===
On August 31, 2014, Seamster was claimed off waivers by the Miami Dolphins. He played in the Dolphins' first two games of the 2014 season, suffered a fractured collarbone in the second game, and ended up on the injured reserve list. The Dolphins waived him on August 30, 2015.

=== New Orleans Saints ===
On September 1, 2015, the New Orleans Saints claimed Seamster off waivers. The team waived him on September 5, but was signed to the team's practice squad the next day. Seamster was promoted to the active roster on October 24. He was released on October 26 and re-signed to the practice squad on October 28. Seamster was cut on November 3.

=== Buffalo Bills ===
On November 9, 2015, Seamster was signed to the Buffalo Bills' practice squad. Seamster was promoted to the active roster on December 30. On September 2, 2016, he was released by the Bills as part of final roster cuts.

=== Dallas Cowboys ===
On September 14, 2016, Seamster was signed to the Dallas Cowboys' practice squad. He signed a reserve/future contract with the Cowboys on January 16, 2017. On September 2, Seamster was waived by the Cowboys.

=== Buffalo Bills (second stint) ===
On October 18, 2017, Seamster was signed to the Buffalo Bills' practice squad. He was released by Buffalo on November 11.

=== Jacksonville Jaguars ===
On December 4, 2017, Seamster was signed to the Jacksonville Jaguars' practice squad. He signed a reserve/future contract with the Jaguars on January 22, 2018. On September 1, Seamster was waived by the Jaguars.
