= Lucille Foster McMillin =

American political figure (1879–1949)

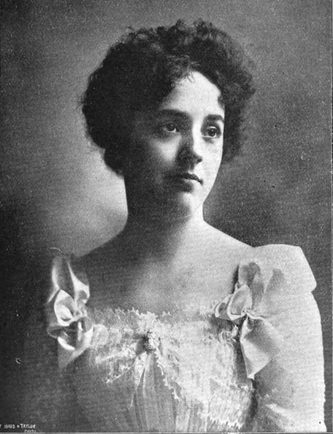
- Lucille Foster McMillin, from a 1902 publication
- Born: Lucille Foster; September 20, 1879; Shreveport, Louisiana, U.S.
- Died: February 25, 1949 (aged 69); Washington, D.C., U.S.
- Spouse: Benton McMillin (m. 1897; died 1933)
- Children: 1

Lucille Foster McMillin (September 20, 1879 – February 25, 1949) was an American political figure. She was First Lady of Tennessee from 1899 to 1903, and was appointed by Franklin D. Roosevelt to the United States Civil Service Commission in 1933.

== Early life ==
Lucille Foster was born near Shreveport, Louisiana, the daughter of Capt. James Martin Foster and Ellen Long Foster. Her mother was the first president of the Louisiana Federation of Women's Clubs. Lucille Foster attended the Mary Baldwin Seminary in Virginia, with further studies in New York and Paris.

== Career ==
Lucille Foster McMillin campaigned with her husband Benton McMillin for statewide and national office, traveling and giving speeches to women's groups, although Tennessee women did not yet have access to the ballot. When Benton McMillin was appointed ambassador to Guatemala, she lived in Guatemala; when he became ambassador to Peru, she moved with him to Lima, Peru, for seven years. As her husband returned to private life in his later years, Lucille Foster McMillin remained active in political life. She was active with the League of Women Voters and president of the Tennessee Federation of Women's Clubs. In 1924, she was a Tennessee delegate to the Democratic National Convention.

She was appointed by Franklin D. Roosevelt to the United States Civil Service Commission in 1933. "No woman will ever be discriminated against in the Civil Service while Mrs. McMillin is here," a colleague told The New York Times in 1941. She wrote several reports during her tenure on the commission: Women in the Federal Service (1938), addressing married women's employment, training opportunities, and the history of women in civil service, including war work; The First Year: A Study of Women's Participation in Federal Defense Activities (1941), and The Second Year: A Study of Women's Participation in War Activities of the Federal Government (1943). She also traveled and lectured as a commissioner, often speaking to women's organizations about federal employment.

She resigned her federal post in 1946, citing health demands.

== Personal life ==
Lucille Foster married Benton McMillin as his second wife in 1897. They had a daughter, Eleanor Foster McMillin (1898-1919). She was widowed in 1933, and died in 1949, aged 69 years, in Washington, D.C.
