= John E. McCall =

American politician and judge (1859–1920)

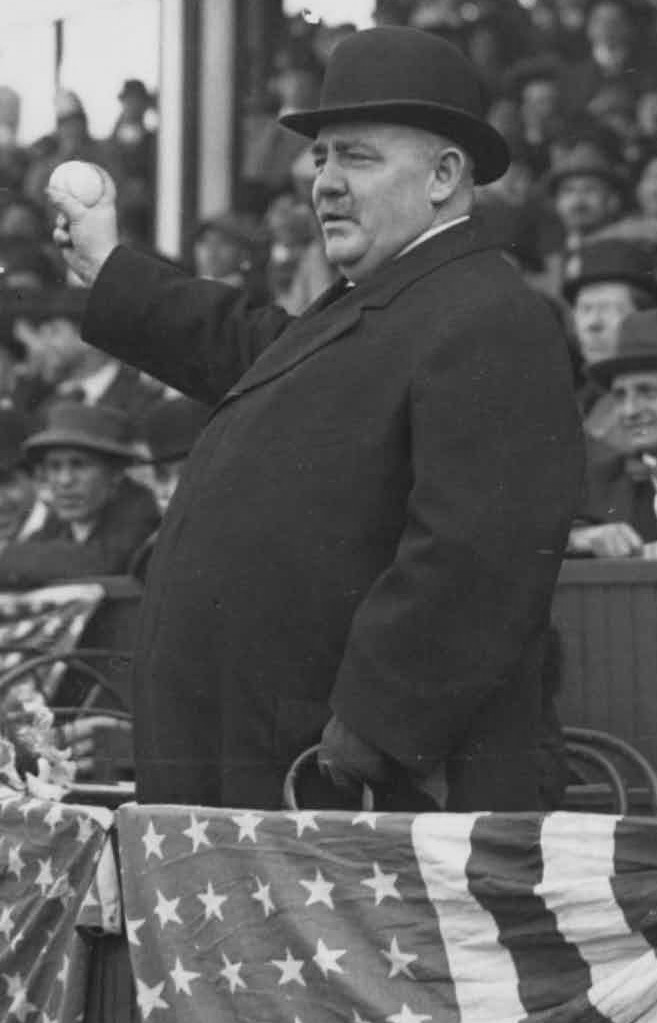

Judge of the United States District Court for the Western District of Tennessee
- In office January 17, 1905 – August 8, 1920
- Appointed by: Theodore Roosevelt
- Preceded by: Eli Shelby Hammond
- Succeeded by: John William Ross

Member of the U.S. House of Representatives from Tennessee's 8th district
- In office March 4, 1895 – March 3, 1897
- Preceded by: Benjamin A. Enloe
- Succeeded by: Thetus W. Sims

Personal details
- Born: John Ethridge McCall; August 14, 1859 Clarksburg, Tennessee, U.S.
- Died: August 8, 1920 (aged 60) Huntingdon, Tennessee, U.S.
- Resting place: Forest Hill Cemetery; Memphis, Tennessee, U.S.
- Party: Republican
- Education: University of Tennessee (A.B.)

John Ethridge McCall (August 14, 1859 – August 8, 1920) was a United States representative from Tennessee and a United States district judge of the United States District Court for the Western District of Tennessee.

== Education and career ==
John Ethridge McCall was born on August 14, 1859, in Clarksburg, Carroll County, Tennessee, McCall attended public and private schools, then received an Artium Baccalaureus degree in 1881 from the University of Tennessee and read law in 1882. He was editor of the Tennessee Republican in 1882. He was admitted to the bar and entered private practice in Huntingdon, Tennessee in 1882. He continued private practice in Lexington, Tennessee starting in 1883. He was an unsuccessful candidate for district attorney in 1886. He was a member of the Tennessee House of Representatives from 1887 to 1889. He was a delegate to the Republican National Convention in 1888 and 1900. He was an Assistant United States Attorney for the Western District of Tennessee from 1890 to 1891. He was an unsuccessful candidate for nomination as Governor of Tennessee in 1892.

== Congressional service ==
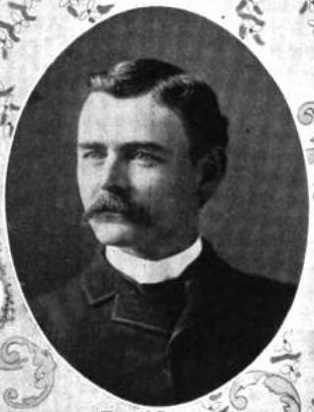
McCall as a Congressman in 1896.

McCall was elected as a Republican from Tennessee's 8th congressional district to the United States House of Representatives of the 54th United States Congress and served from March 4, 1895 to March 3, 1897. He was an unsuccessful candidate for reelection in 1896 to the 55th United States Congress. He was an unsuccessful Republican candidate for Governor of Tennessee in 1900. He was collector of internal revenue for the fifth district of Tennessee 1902 to 1905.

== Federal judicial service ==
McCall was nominated by President Theodore Roosevelt on January 9, 1905, to a seat on the United States District Court for the Western District of Tennessee vacated by Judge Eli Shelby Hammond. He was confirmed by the United States Senate on January 17, 1905, and received his commission the same day. His service terminated on August 8, 1920, due to his death in Huntingdon. He was interred in Forest Hill Cemetery in Memphis, Tennessee.

Party political offices
Preceded by James Alexander Fowler	Republican nominee for Governor of Tennessee; 1900	Succeeded by H. Campbell
U.S. House of Representatives
Preceded by Benjamin A. Enloe	Member of the U.S. House of Representatives from Tennessee's 8th congressional district 1895–1897	Succeeded by Thetus W. Sims
Legal offices
Preceded by Eli Shelby Hammond	Judge of the United States District Court for the Western District of Tennessee; 1905–1920	Succeeded by John William Ross
