= George Yost Coffin =

American cartoonist

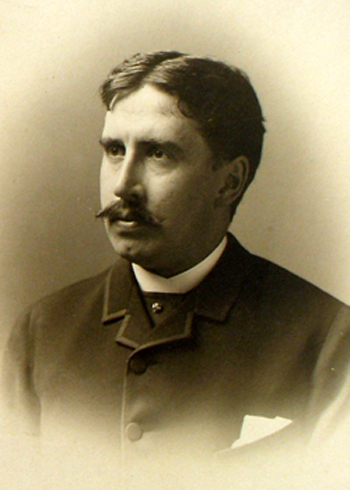
- Born: 30 March 1850 Pottstown, Pennsylvania
- Died: 28 November 1896 (aged 46)
- Area: Cartoonist

George Yost Coffin (30 March 1850 – 28 November 1896) was a political cartoonist noted for his characters and his work in Washington, D.C. in the late 19th century. He is also known for his diaries kept as a teenager during the US Civil War. Coffin's political cartoons appeared in The Washington Post.

Born 30 March 1850 in Pottstown, Pennsylvania, his parents were Sarah A. Harrington and George M. Coffin.

Coffin began his studies in the Preparatory Department at Columbian College in 1862. In 1904, the college changed its name to the George Washington University.

His papers are held by George Washington University.
