= James Alexander Fowler =

American lawyer

James A. Fowler
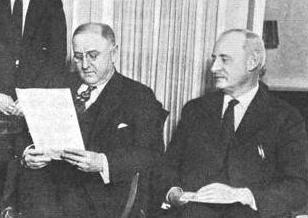
- Fowler (right) with Attorney General Harry M. Daugherty in 1922
- Born: February 22, 1863; Knox County, Tennessee, USA
- Died: November 18, 1955 (aged 92); Knoxville, Tennessee, USA
- Resting place: Greenwood Cemetery; Knoxville, Tennessee, USA
- Education: East Tennessee Wesleyan University, LL.D.
- Political party: Republican
- Spouse: Lucy Hornsby
- Children: Harriet, Harley, Hornsby, James, Jr., Edward, Samuel
- Parent(s): Joseph Fowler and Mary Conner

James Alexander Fowler (February 22, 1863 – November 18, 1955) was an American lawyer who served in various capacities as an Assistant Attorney General and special assistant to the U.S. Attorney General from 1908 to 1914, and from 1921 to 1926. In this role, he either argued or prepared briefs for several notable Supreme Court cases, and was active in the organization of the short-lived Commerce Court. Fowler was an unsuccessful candidate for Governor of Tennessee in 1898 as well as for U.S. Senator in 1928. He served one term as mayor of Knoxville, Tennessee, from 1927 to 1929.

== Biography ==
=== Early life ===
Fowler was born at Bull Run Crossing in rural Knox County, Tennessee, the son of Joseph and Mary Conner Fowler. He attended the Holston Seminary in New Market, Tennessee, and obtained his law degree from East Tennessee Wesleyan University (now Tennessee Wesleyan University) in 1884. He then moved to Clinton, Tennessee, and worked as principal of Clinton High School for about a year. He was admitted to the bar in 1886, and commenced the practice of law in Anderson County and surrounding counties.

Fowler received the Republican Party nomination for governor in 1898. Democrats dominated most statewide elections during this period, and Fowler was easily defeated in the general election, managing to garner just 39.8% of the vote.

In 1899, Fowler formed a law partnership, Lucky, Sanford and Fowler, with C.E. Lucky and future Supreme Court justice Edward Terry Sanford. He moved to Knoxville two years later. In 1907, Fowler served as a special prosecutor during the high-profile trial of James Fulton, an attorney accused of killing fellow attorney and University of Tennessee football standout, Sam Parker.

=== Justice Department ===
Fowler was appointed U.S. Assistant Attorney General by President Theodore Roosevelt in June 1908, and was reappointed by President William Howard Taft the following year. In May 1911, he was appointed assistant to the attorney general (which marked a promotion) by Taft. While the Taft Administration came to an end in March 1913 after his defeat in the presidential election of the previous year, Fowler was retained as a special assistant by Woodrow Wilson's first attorney general, James C. McReynolds. Following McReynolds' nomination to the Supreme Court in August 1914, Fowler returned to private practice in Knoxville.

As an assistant or special assistant to the attorney general, Fowler primarily handled the Justice Department's antitrust cases (which are now handled by the department's Antitrust Division). In this role, he argued several cases before the Supreme Court. In 1913, he prepared the brief and delivered the argument for United States v. Chandler-Dunbar Water Power Company, a case involving water rights and compensation for property seized by the government. His brief in this case was referenced throughout the 1936 landmark case, Ashwander v. Tennessee Valley Authority. Fowler also argued several cases before the short-lived Commerce Court, and later published a paper in the North American Review defending this court.

In 1921, Fowler was appointed special assistant to the attorney general by Attorney General Harry M. Daugherty. Daugherty initially tasked Fowler with handling the federal government's cases arising from New York's Lockwood investigations, which involved acts of extortion committed by the leaders of building materials unions. He later handled several Supreme Court cases, including Federal Trade Commission v. American Tobacco Co. (1924), United States v. Ninety-Five Barrels Alleged Apple Cider Vinegar, and United States v. General Electric Co. (1926).

=== Later life ===
Fowler was elected to Knoxville's city council in 1927, and chosen as mayor by his fellow councilmen. He was reelected in 1929, but did not serve as mayor during his second term. Fowler received the Republican nomination for U.S. Senate in 1928, but was defeated in the general election by Kenneth McKellar. After his second city council term ended in 1931, he returned to private practice. He died on November 18, 1955, and was interred in Knoxville's Greenwood Cemetery.

Fowler was a member of the University of Tennessee board of trustees, and was president of the board of trustees for his alma mater, Tennessee Wesleyan College. He was also active in numerous Methodist charities and organizations. His lawfirm, renamed Fowler and Fowler after his sons joined, continued operating in Knoxville under various partners for several years after his death, and his descendants continued practicing law in the Knoxville area into the 21st century.

== See also ==
- Ray Jenkins
- Hugh B. Lindsay
- John Randolph Neal, Jr.

Party political offices
Preceded by G. N. Tillman	Republican nominee for Governor of Tennessee; 1898	Succeeded by John E. McCall
Preceded by Newell Sanders	Republican nominee for U.S. Senator from Tennessee (Class 1); 1928	Succeeded by Ben W. Hooper
