= James County, Tennessee =

Former county in Tennessee, US

Coordinates: 35.083°N 85.050°W

The location of James County in Tennessee

James County is a former county in Tennessee. It was created by an act of the Tennessee General Assembly on January 30, 1871. Lands were taken from a small portion of Bradley County and the eastern third of Hamilton County. James County was named in honor of the Rev. Jesse J. James, the father of Elbert Abdiel James, who introduced legislation for the formation of the county. Ooltewah was selected as the county seat.

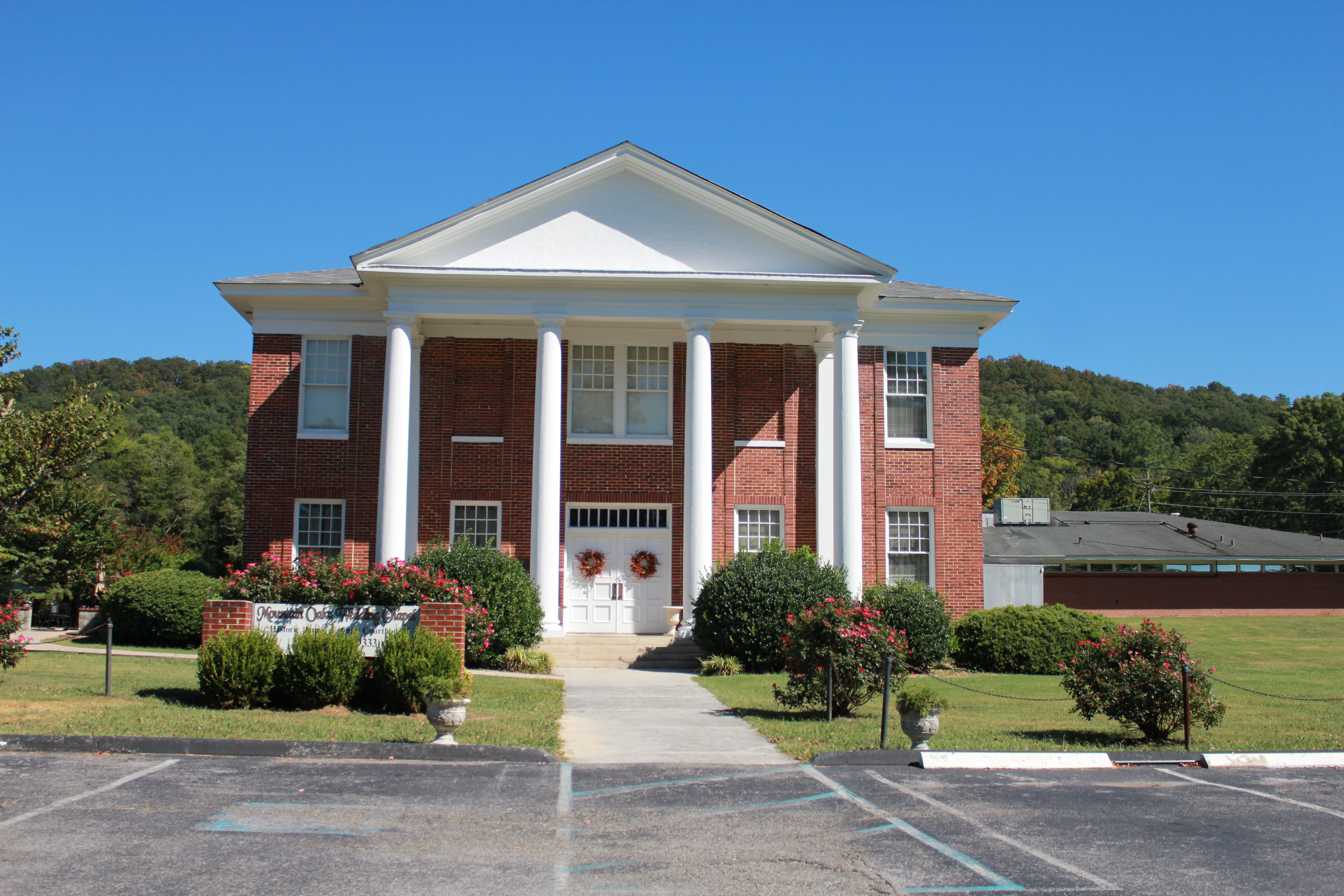
The third courthouse of (the now defunct) James County in Ooltewah

The county went bankrupt in April 1919 and was reincorporated into Hamilton County by a vote of its citizens on December 11, 1919. Few records remain of what was once James County due largely to courthouse fires in 1890 and 1913. The few remaining James County records are now kept in Hamilton County. The third and final James County Courthouse is the major landmark of Ooltewah.

== Population ==
Historical population
Census	Pop.	Note	%±
1880	5,187		—
1890	4,903		−5.5%
1900	5,407		10.3%
1910	5,210		−3.6%
U.S. Decennial Census
