= Knox College (Illinois) =

Private college in Galesburg, Illinois, US

Coordinates: 40°56′35″N 90°22′16″W

- Former name: Knox Manual Labor College (1837–1857)
- Motto: Latin: Veritas
- Motto in English: Truth
- Type: Private liberal arts college
- Established: February 15, 1837; 189 years ago
- Endowment: $176.6 million (2025)
- President: C. Andrew McGadney
- Faculty: 99
- Students: 1,108 (fall 2025)
- Location: Galesburg, Illinois, U.S.
- Campus: 82 acres (33 ha); Small city
- Colors: Purple and gold
- Nickname: Prairie Fire
- Sporting affiliations: NCAA Division III; Midwest Conference
- Mascot: Blaze (mascot)
- Website: knox.edu

Knox College is a private liberal arts college in Galesburg, Illinois, United States. It was founded in 1837 by anti-slavery advocates and has ties to the Underground Railroad movement. With over 1,100 students enrolled representing 43 states and 56 countries, Knox College offers 99 majors and minors. Knox College is a member of Colleges That Change Lives.

== History ==
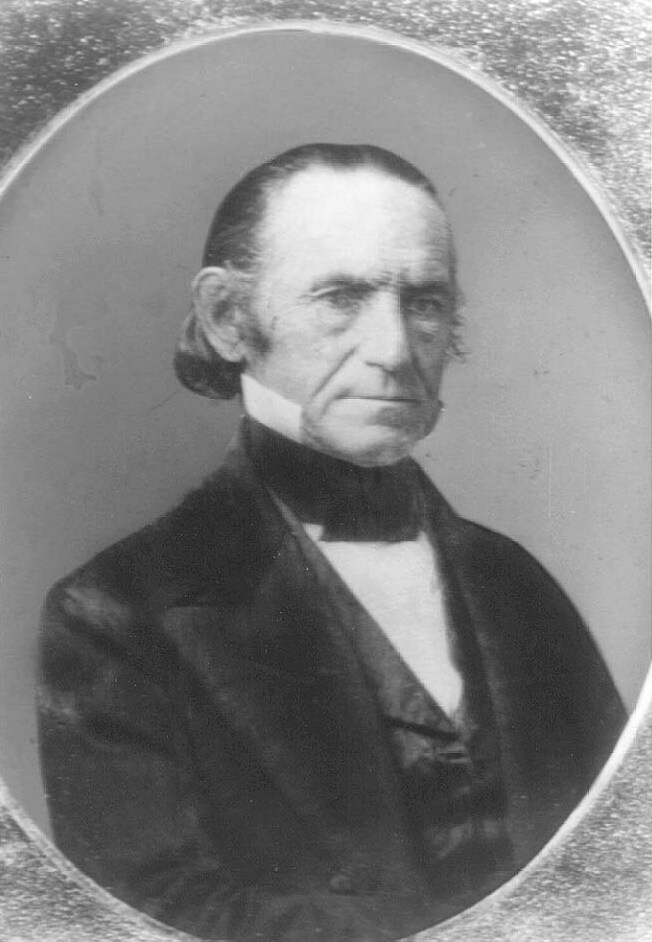
George Washington Gale (1789–1861), founding father of Knox College

Knox College was founded as Knox Manual Labor College by Presbyterians and Congregationalists from New York state organized by George Washington Gale, who previously had founded the Oneida Institute. Gale in 1836 released a "Circular and Plan" for the founding of a manual labor colleges which described a subscriber- and land purchase-based method of funding. His plan resulted in the founding of at least one school when in 1837 subscribers settled in what became Galesburg and began to build the college. The first president was Hiram Huntington Kellogg Sr., who went on a book-buying trip to England; the books he acquired form the Knox Manual Labor College Collection. Knox opened to students in 1843 and was one of the earliest colleges to admit Black people and women. Like Gale, many of the founders of Knox College and residents of Galesburg were abolitionists and actively supported the Underground Railroad.

Knox has been known by its present name since 1857. The name came about as a compromise among its founders. Though founded by a colony of Presbyterians and Congregationalists, the county where the college stands was already named Knox County, after Henry Knox, the first United States Secretary of War. Arguments have also been made that the college was named for Calvinist leader John Knox. It is not certain for which Knox it was named (if not both). George Candee Gale, a great-great-grandson of two of the founders, explains that

Contrary to general belief, Knox was not named for either General Knox or the Scottish Presbyterian Knox, according to my father.... Some wanted the college named for one Knox, some for the other; so they compromised on KNOX. Certainly most of them were pious enough to want the churchman, and fighters enough to want the soldier as well.

Jonathan Blanchard's presidency led the school out of debt, but ignited a controversy about whether the school was loyal to the Congregational church or the Presbyterians. Gale and Blanchard were forced out of the school as a result.

In 1841, a female seminary was built. The building burned down in 1843 but the college continued to provide classes for women, first in co-ed preparatory classes, then, by 1850, in the Female Collegiate Department. In 1857, a new 5-story Female Seminary building was constructed which accommodated up to ninety women. In 1867, the Knox College president William Curtis assaulted the Principal of the Female Seminary, Ada Howard. Curtis resigned after students protested and conducted a sit-down strike. In 1872, women were awarded college degrees for the first time at the college. As more women began to attend, the building was expanded in 1885. The addition was named Whiting Hall in recognition of the Principal of the Female Seminary, M. H. Whiting. In 1891, the college became fully co-ed. In 1892, the building was expanded again and the entire building became Whiting Hall. It remained the sole women's dormitory until after World War II.

=== History of Abolitionism ===
Like Gale, many of the founders of Knox College and residents of Galesburg were abolitionists and actively supported the Underground Railroad. Galesburg had several anti-slavery societies and was a stop on the Underground Railroad. Knox was officially recognized by the National Park Service as a member of the Underground Railroad Network to Freedom Program in 2006.

==== The Lincoln-Douglas Debates ====
Knox was the site of the fifth debate between Abraham Lincoln and Stephen A. Douglas in 1858. The Old Main building is the only extant site of the debates. Two years after the debates, during his presidential campaign, Lincoln was awarded Knox College's first honorary doctorate, a Doctor of Laws degree announced at the commencement exercises of July 5, 1860.

==== Lincoln Studies Center ====
Rodney Davis and Douglas L. Wilson established the Lincoln Studies Center in 1998. The center deals with issues relating to Lincoln's life and legacy. In August 2009, the National Endowment for the Humanities "We the People" initiative awarded Knox $850,000, "a grant that will provide the base of a permanent endowment for the Center."

== Academics ==
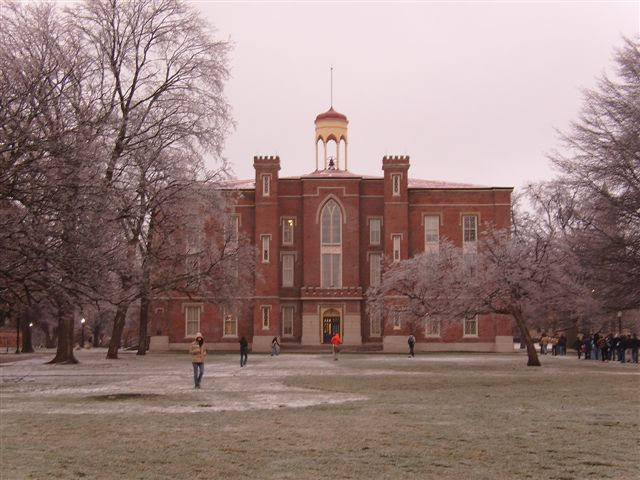
Old Main, the oldest building on the campus of Knox College

Knox offers over 42 majors and 51 minors programs, concluding in Bachelors of Arts or Bachelors of Science degrees. It employs a non-traditional 3–3 academic calendar rather than a semester-based approach. In each of the three 10-week terms, students take three courses. Faculty members teach two courses each term, giving them more time for one-on-one mentoring. All courses of study at Knox contain common elements, including an educational plan that students design. Students also participate in Immersive Terms, where students work on one subject in-depth.

In 2007 the Peace Corps launched a program at Knox, establishing the Peace Corps Preparatory Program, the first of its kind in the country; Knox has several cooperative programs with other universities, including engineering and preprofessional paths like law and medicine.

In 2025, Knox College became a full-time partner of the MARCO Consortium, a group of higher-ed institutions that collaboratively operate the Robert L. Mutel Telescope (RLMT) to provide hands-on astronomy experience and research opportunities to undergraduate students.

=== Immersion Experiences ===
Knox curriculum includes Immersion Experiences, where students spend an entire term on one discipline.

Knox is the only undergraduate program in the country to offer Repertory Theatre Immersive Term, or Rep Term, the repertory theatre experience where students learn how to start and manage a theatre company.

Knox is known for its Green Oaks term, an interdisciplinary program at the 700-acre (2.8 km^{2}; 1.1 sq mi) Green Oaks Biological Field Station. The Green Field Station began in 1955 under the guidance of zoologists Paul Shepard and George Ward.

Other immersive terms include clinical psychology, open studio (art), StartUp (business), Japan term, Summer Scholars, and short-term experiences from one to three weeks. Short-term experiences include the Chicago Term, where students spend a three-week internship in Chicago.

The three most popular majors at Knox, based on 2024 graduates, were Business Administration and Management, Computer Science, and Creative Writing.

== Admission ==
As of Fall 2024, Knox College has an acceptance rate of 71%, with half of applicants admitted with SAT scores between 1180 and 1440, or an ACT score between 21 and 32. Graduation rate was 67%.

As of 2023, 52% of first-year students received financial aid. Knox offers a $2,000 "Power of Experience Grant" to every senior. Knox also offers 100% tuition-free aid to qualifying Illinois residents through its Prairie Promise program.

=== Student body ===
1,136 students were enrolled at Knox in September 2024. 52% of U.S. students are of color and 27% are international students. The gender distribution is about equal, with 50.3% being male and 49.7% female.

== Student life ==
=== Traditions ===
Pumphandle is an annual tradition dating back to 1885 during which new members of the community are welcomed to Knox. On the afternoon before the start of the academic year, all members of the Knox community gather on the south lawn outside Old Main. The president of the college "leads the welcoming line, shaking each person's hand in turn. Everyone shakes the hands of those who have gone before, and the line grows, snaking around the campus."

Flunk Day is an annual spring carnival. Classes are canceled for the day as the student body turns its attention to a joke issue of the student newspaper, live music, inflatable bounce rooms, petting zoos, a mud pit, a paint fight, and a seniors vs faculty softball game. The date of Flunk Day changes every year and is a secret until the entire student body is awakened at around 5am on the day.

Bronze Turkey Game is a yearly football game between rivalries Knox College and Monmouth College, held around Thanksgiving. It began in the 1880's.

International Fair, also called I-Fair, is held annually on campus, with a different theme each year incorporating various cultures and international traditions.

=== Clubs and Organizations ===
Knox has over 80 student organizations. It is also home to nine Greek-letter organizations.

=== Student media ===
- The Knox Student — a weekly student newspaper
- Catch — a literary magazine and oldest continuously published literary journal in the country
- The Common Room — online journal of literary criticism
- Quiver — a literary magazine of genre fiction
- X Journal— a visual arts journal

Knox's radio station is WVKC, and was established in 1957. It is on the fourth floor of George Davis Hall, a former science building that now houses the social science and language departments. Its frequency in Galesburg is 90.7.

Knox also runs Caxton Club, a student-run literary organization named after the first English printer, William Caxton. It brings brings published writers to campus for readings and special events.

==== Awards & Recognitions ====
The Knox Student has won numerous awards as one of the best college newspapers in the state of the Illinois, including numerous first-place category awards and general excellence awards from the Illinois College Press Association.

Catch earned third place from the Association of Writers and Writing Programs (AWP) for its Spring 2025 edition, as well as other recognitions from the Associated Collegiate Press and Coordinating Council of Literary Magazines.

WVKC radio was featured on the Princeton Review "Best College Radio Stations" list several years.

=== Athletics ===
Knox athletics logo

The Knox College mascot is a fox named Blaze and was introduced in 2016. Knox's nickname for its athletics teams was renamed Prairie Fire in 1993 due to sensitivity about its previous nickname, the Old Siwash. The word Siwash is a corruption of the French term "sauvage." This was a derogatory term used by European traders to refer to indigenous people.

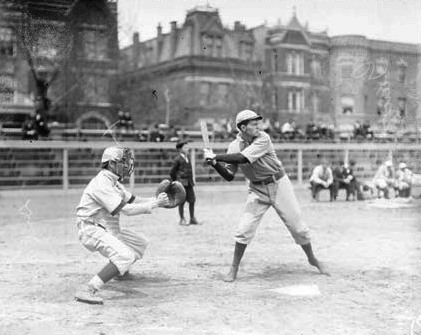
A Knox baseball player at bat in a 1908 game versus DePaul University

The term Old Siwash was popularized by George Helgesen Fitch (Knox Class of 1897) in his Saturday Evening Post articles and a book At Good Old Siwash. The term was widely used to denote small midwestern liberal arts colleges because of the popularity of Fitch's writings.

The Prairie Fire refers to the annual spring burning of the prairie lands at Green Oaks. First conducted in the 1950s by Knox professor Paul Shepard, the burn protects prairie grasses from intrusions of woodland scrub and competition with other species.

Knox is a member of the Midwest Conference of the NCAA at the Division III level. The school offers men's and women's varsity sports, including baseball, cross country, football, basketball, golf, soccer, softball, track and field, and volleyball, as well as student-run club sports, including water polo, fencing, and ultimate frisbee. In June 2026, Knox launched women's flag football as a club sport with plans to transition to full varsity status for the 2027-2028 academic year.

The Bronze Turkey trophy, awarded annually to the victor of their rivalry game with Monmouth College, was created in 1928 and is the brainchild of Knox football alumnus Bill Collins. ESPN named the Bronze Turkey the fifth "most bizarre college football rivalry trophy". Monmouth has dominated the rivalry in recent years, with Knox last winning the game in 1998.

== Campus ==
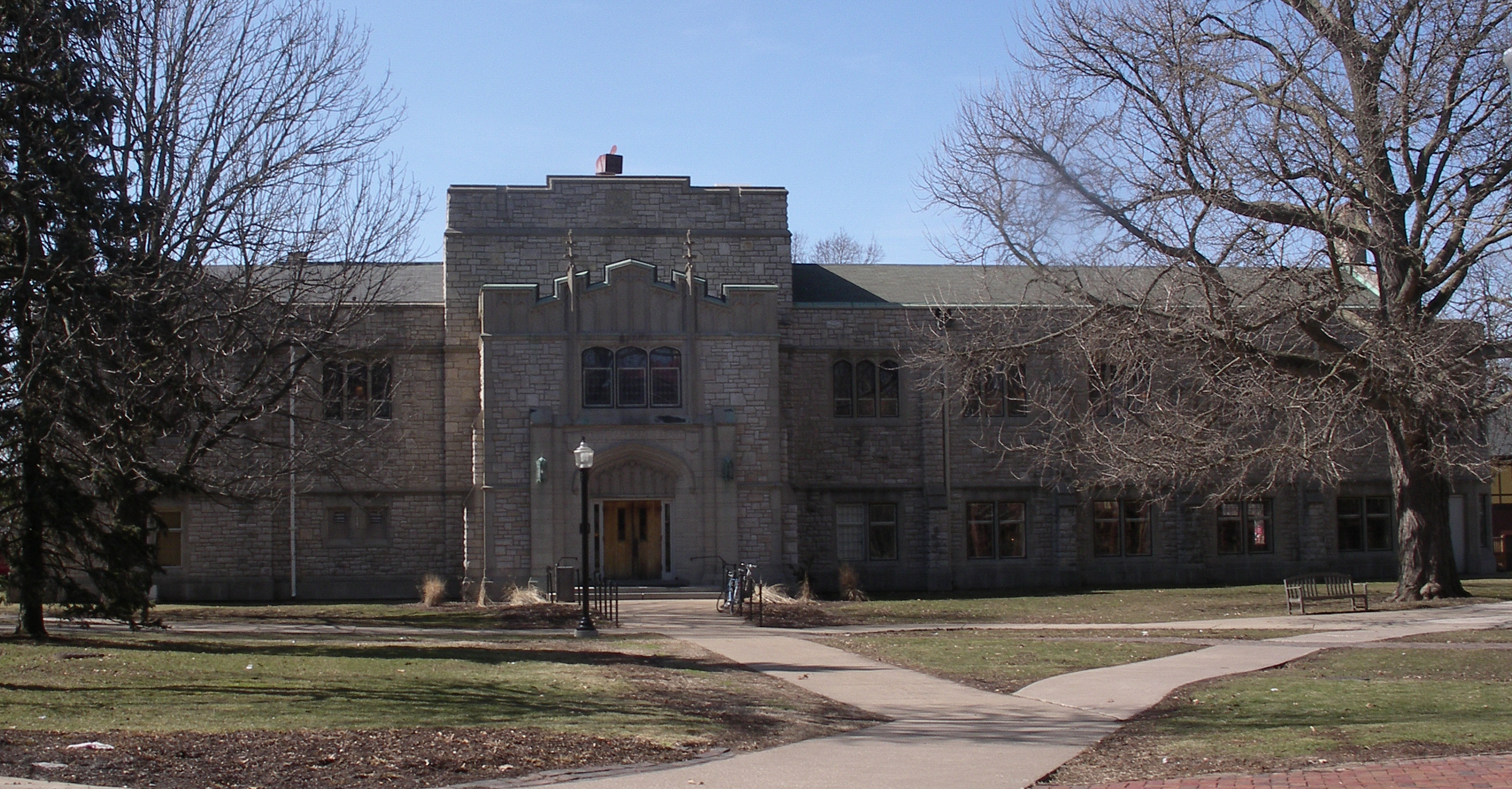
Seymour Library

Knox College has 45 academic and residential buildings on its 82-acre (330,000 m^{2}) campus. It has electron microscopes, a gas chromatograph mass spectrometer, a 17-inch (0.43 m) Corrected Dall-Kirkham reflector telescope manufactured by Planewave Instruments, and a Nuclear Magnetic Resonance spectrometer. There is also a complete skeleton of a 55-foot-long Fin whale on display in the atrium of the Science-Mathematics building.

The state-of-the-art Knox College Whitcomb Art Center opened in 2017.

Students have access to the Inter University Consortium for Political & Social Research, the Strong Collection of 18th- and 19th-century maps and photographs, the Hughes Collection of manuscripts and first editions from Hemingway and his "Lost Generation" contemporaries, and a 700-acre (2.8 km^{2}) natural prairie reserve, the Green Oaks Field Station.

The centerpiece of campus is Old Main, "the oldest building on its campus, and the best preserved site of one of the 1858 senatorial debates between Abraham Lincoln and Stephen Douglas", a National Historic Landmark and part of the National Register of Historic Places.

Built in 1928, the Seymour Library was ranked third "Best Library" in the nation by the Princeton Review in 2001. Inside its leaded glass windows and oak-paneled reading rooms, the library houses 350,000 books and more than 14,000 periodicals. Its special collections include the Finley Collection of Midwest History, the Strong Collection of 18th- and 19th-century maps and photographs, the Hughes Collection of manuscripts and first editions of Faulkner, Hemingway and his "Lost Generation" contemporaries, and an original Diderot Encyclopédie.

Students established the Knox College Community Garden in 2007 as an independent study project. It became Knox Farm in 2009, an on-campus urban farm tended by student volunteers whose produce is used on-campus and across the community.

Campus also includes the Green Oaks Biological Field Station, also commonly called Green oaks, a 700-acre property of protected forest, waterways, and trails about thirty minutes from campus.

== U.S. Department of Education College Scorecard ==
According to the U.S. Department of Education, 21% of students who started college at Knox College later transferred to another school. This compares to the national average of over 30% of students transferring colleges. 17% of the entering class did not return after their first year. This compares to a national average of 30% of college students who do not return after their first year. African Americans make up 13.4% of the U.S. population in general, about 8% of surrounding area, and they are 6% of the Knox College student body. Knox College graduates typically earn between $18,300 and $33,100, less than the average starting salary paid to college graduates, about $50,000, although there is great variation in both of these figures based on chosen majors and career paths. Knox alumni go into fields ranging from literature to neurosurgery. Furthermore, published earning data is skewed by the fact that a significant number of Knox students do not seek full time employment immediately after graduating from Knox, instead going on to pursue graduate degree programs, including PhDs, medical school, and law school, during which time work is delayed or only part time.

== Notable people ==
=== Alumni ===
==== Arts and entertainment ====
- Michael J. Budds, musicologist
- Amy Carlson 1990 — actress, known for NBC television series Third Watch, the CBS series Blue Bloods, and Law & Order: Trial by Jury
- Vir Das 2004 — comedian, Bollywood actor
- Ethyl Eichelberger — a famous drag queen, playwright and actor, for whom a prize was founded by downtown Manhattan theatre institution P.S. 122
- Eugene Field — poet, journalist, and author
- Jack Finney 1934 — science-fiction author, works include The Body Snatchers and Time and Again
- George Fitch 1897 — author and humorist
- Otto Harbach 1895 — songwriter for whom Knox's Harbach Theater is named Some well-known songs are "Smoke Gets in Your Eyes", "Indian Love Call" and "Cuddle up a Little Closer, Lovey Mine".
- B. J. Hollars 2007 — Author & professor of English at University of Wisconsin–Eau Claire
- Don Marquis — author and journalist
- Edgar Lee Masters — poet and novelist, best known as author of Spoon River Anthology (1915)
- Ander Monson 1997 — novelist and poet, author of Other Electricities, and Vacationland, a collection of poems
- Rose Polenzani — independent folk musician
- Gene Rayburn — announcer for The Tonight Show; host of The Match Game and other game shows
- Dorothea Tanning 1932 — surrealist painter; wife of surrealist painter Max Ernst
- Kathryn Tanquary 2010 — author of juvenile fiction novel The Night Parade
- Allan Arthur Willman 1928 — classical pianist, 20th-century composer, chair of University of Wyoming music department

==== Government and military ====
- Edgar Addison Bancroft — lawyer and diplomat, served as United States Ambassador to Japan 1924–1925
- Job Adams Cooper 1867 — Sixth Governor of State of Colorado, 1889–1891
- David P. Fridovich 1974 — retired lieutenant general and Green Beret in U.S. Army, former Deputy Commander of U.S. military's United States Special Operations Command
- Hobart R. Gay 1917 — U.S. Army general, served under General George S. Patton
- Robert Hanssen 1966 — FBI agent convicted of spying for Soviet Union and Russia in 2001, subject of film Breach (2007)
- Don Harmon 1988 — Illinois State Senator (Democrat) and 39th President of the Illinois Senate
- Loyal M. Haynes 1918 — Brigadier General in U.S. Army, commanding general of second Division Artillery Unit in Korean War and survivor of the 1946 C-53 Skytrooper crash on the Gauli Glacier
- Ismat T. Kittani 1951 — former Iraqi Ambassador to the United Nations and President of the United Nations General Assembly; helped start Knox's Honor System
- Lorenzo D. Lewelling — 12th Governor of Kansas
- John Podesta 1971 — Chief of Staff for President Bill Clinton
- Hiram R. Revels — AME and Methodist Episcopal minister, and first black U.S. Senator (1870–1871)
- Ezekiel S. Sampson — U.S. Representative and lawyer from Iowa
- Don Samuelson — 25th governor of Idaho (1967–1971)
- Joseph J. Sisco 1941 — diplomat under Henry Kissinger; president of American University (1976–1980)
- Zack Stephenson 2006 — Minnesota State Representative (2019–present)

==== Journalists and activists ====
- Barry Bearak 1971 — Pulitzer Prize winning journalist
- James B. Bradwell, attorney, judge, newspaper publisher, suffragist
- Charles Eastman — Native American physician, activist, and Boy Scout official
- John Huston Finley 1887 — professor at Princeton University, president of Knox College (Illinois) and City College of New York, associate editor of The New York Times
- Bob Jamieson — ABC news correspondent
- Charles Wesley Leffingwell 1862 — editor of The Living Church magazine
- S. S. McClure 1881 — muckraking journalism pioneer, founder of McClure's Magazine
- Ellen Browning Scripps 1859 — newspaper magnate, philanthropist; helped found Scripps College and Scripps Institution of Oceanography
- Mary Allen West 1855 — journalist and temperance worker

==== Business leaders and innovators ====
- Matt Berg 2000 — CEO of Ona, former director of ICT for Millennium Villages Project at Columbia University's Earth Institute; named in 2010 as one of the Time 100 Most Influential People of the World
- Earnest Elmo Calkins 1891 — founder of first modern advertising agency
- Whitcomb L. Judson — inventor of the zipper
- James M. Kilts 1970 — former CEO of Gillette
- Thomas E. Kurtz 1950 — co-inventor of BASIC computer language

==== Sports ====
- James L. Crane - Sixth head football coach at Vanderbilt University
- Chad Eisele — coach and current athletic administrator
- Bill Essick — former pitcher for Cincinnati Reds, baseball executive and scout
- Fred Ewing 1913 — physician and head football coach at the University of Oklahoma, and the first to require academically eligible players
- John S. Grogan - University of Idaho coach who played football at Knox College where he dropkicked a 55-yard field goal in an upset win over the Illinois Fighting Illini.
- Adolph Hamblin - Biology professor and multi-sport coach at West Virginia State College.
- Todd Monken 1989 — Head Coach of the NFL's Cleveland Browns
- Tom Rethman - American college football coach
- Bill Senn - NFL running back
- Clarence Spears - College football coach and College Football Hall of Fame inductee
- John Wozniak 1999 — Wide receivers' coach with the NFL's Cleveland Browns; former running back coach at Oklahoma State University

==== Other alumni ====
- Edgar D. Coolidge — dentist and endodontist
- Frank J. Jirka Jr. 1944 — former president of the American Medical Association
- David A. Kolb 1939 — educational theorist whose interests and publications focus on experiential learning, the individual and social change, career development, and executive and professional education.
- Alexander Kuo 1961 — Distinguished Affiliated Scholar at Knox, author, winner of 2002 American Book Award
- Barnabas Root 1870 — one of the first black men to receive a college degree in Illinois

=== Notable faculty ===
- Jonathan Blanchard, abolitionist, social reformer, and educator; president of Knox College and founder of Wheaton College
- George Washington Gale, founder of Knox College
- Mikiso Hane, Japanese historian and professor at Knox College
- Robert Hellenga, novelist and George A. Lawrence Distinguished Service Professor of English at Knox College
- George William Hunter, biologist and author of Civic Biology, textbook at heart of Scopes Monkey Trial; former professor at Knox College
- Tim Kasser, psychologist known for his work on materialism and well-being; professor at Knox College 1995–2019
- Hiram Huntington Kellogg Sr., first president of Knox College
- Francis T. McAndrew, evolutionary psychologist and essayist; Cornelia H. Dudley Professor of Psychology at Knox College (1979–2025)
- Robert Seibert, Robert W. Murphy Professor Emeritus of Political Science at Knox College and coauthor of Politics and Change in the Middle East
- Chad Simpson, short and flash fiction author
- Douglas L. Wilson, author, co-director of Lincoln Studies Center; George A. Lawrence Distinguished Service Professor Emeritus of English at Knox College
