= John T. Raulston =

American judge (1868–1956)

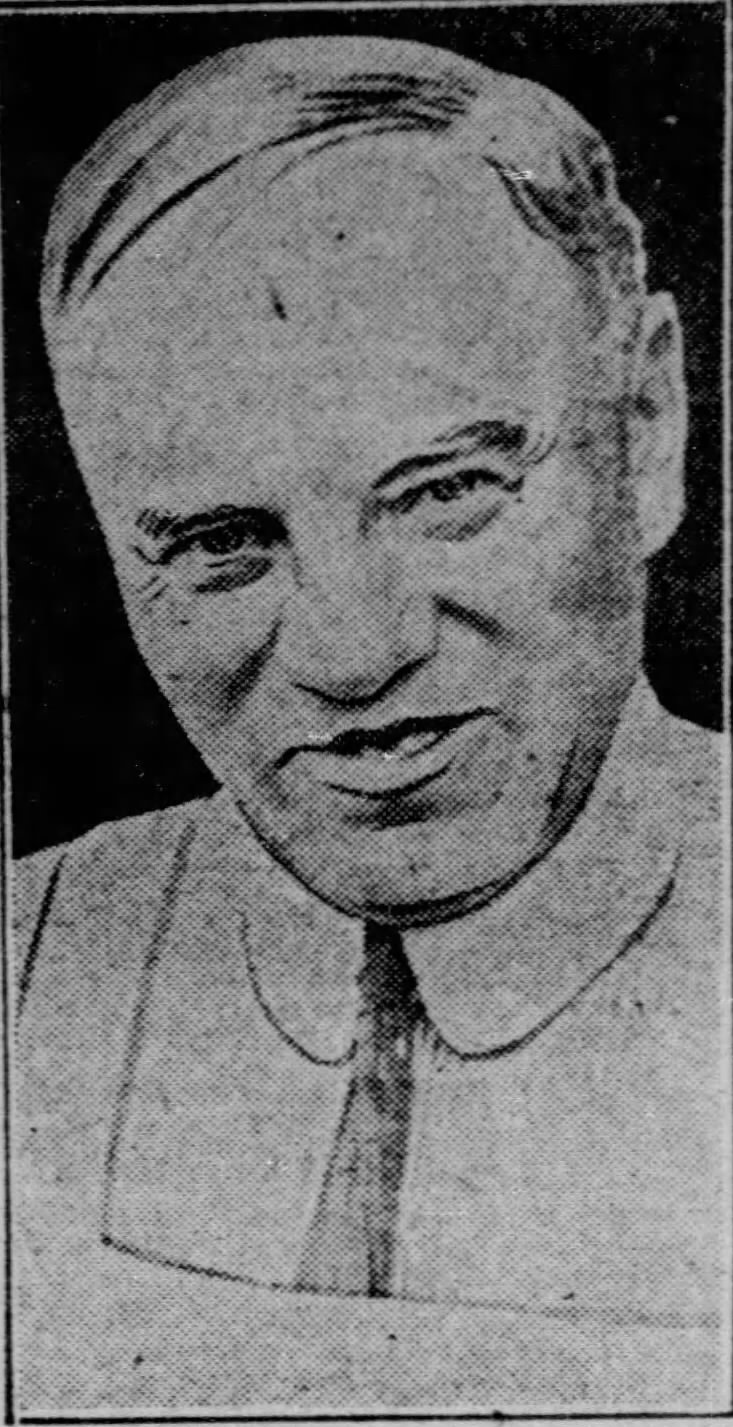
Raulston in 1925

John Tate Raulston (September 22, 1868 – July 11, 1956) was an American state judge in Rhea County, Tennessee, who received national publicity for presiding over the 1925 Scopes trial, a famous creationism–evolution debate.

== Early life and education ==
Raulston, who was a member of a prominent Republican family, was born on a small farm in Marion County, Tennessee. He attended U.S. Grant University, later known as Tennessee Wesleyan College, and was admitted to the bar in 1896. He served in the Tennessee state legislature and was an unsuccessful Republican candidate for the U.S. House of Representatives in 1908 against John A. Moon. He was elected judge of the Eighteenth Tennessee District in 1918.

== Scopes Trial ==
Raulston commenced the proceedings by obtaining the grand jury indictment of John T. Scopes, a 24-year-old schoolteacher. Raulston accelerated the convening of the grand jury and "... all but instructed the grand jury to indict Scopes, despite the meager evidence against him and the widely reported stories questioning whether the willing defendant had ever taught evolution in the classroom."

During the trial, Raulston sided with the prosecution and barred testimony from experts in theology and the natural sciences. He was accused of being biased and frequently clashed with famed attorney Clarence Darrow, who represented Scopes. At the outset of the trial, Raulston quoted Genesis and the state Butler Act, which was the basis of the prosecution. He also warned the jury not to judge the merit of the law, which would become the focus of the trial. Contemporary accounts refer to him as "plump, red-faced and middle aged."

After a raucous trial, in which Darrow squared off against William Jennings Bryan for the prosecution, Scopes was convicted and fined $100. The conviction was reversed by an appellate court because the maximum fine was $50, but Scopes was never retried.

After the trial, Raulston gave lectures on the legal aspects of fundamentalism. But he was unable to build a political future on the Scopes trial, and he was defeated for reelection a year after the trial. He later ran for governor and retired in the mid-1940s. In a statement several years after the trial, Raulston said that he had modified his views and no longer believed that the state should pass laws limiting the right to teach science to students when doing so didn't harm their morals.

Raulston was portrayed as the character Judge Merle Coffey in the play Inherit the Wind and the 1960 film adaptation. In the film, the character of the judge was played by Harry Morgan. He was also played by John Cullum in the 1999 television remake.

== See also ==
- Butler Act
