= George William Hunter =

American writer (1863–1948)

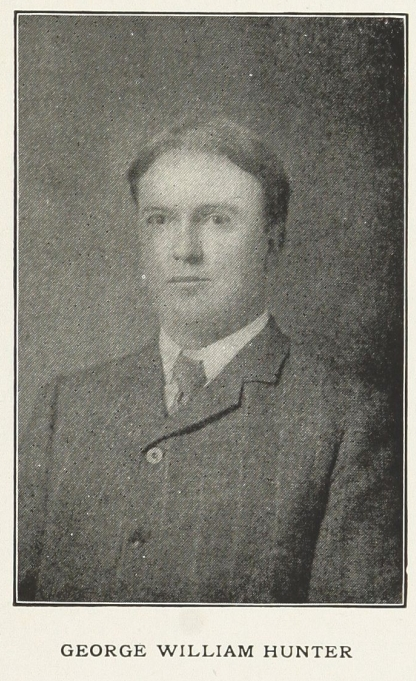
- Hunter c. 1912
- Born: June 29, 1863
- Died: February 4, 1948 (aged 84)
- Occupation: Textbook writer

George William Hunter (June 29, 1863, Williamsburg, West Virginia – February 4, 1948) was an American writer. He wrote Civic Biology, the text at the center of the Scopes "monkey" trial in 1925.

George William Hunter Jr. spent his later years lecturing at the Claremont Colleges. He died on February 4, 1948, at the age of 74, in Claremont, California. He is buried in Hillside Cemetery in Redlands, California.

== Teaching ==
A biologist, he went to school at Williams College in Massachusetts. He earned his doctorate at New York University. During World War I, he was the educational director for the War Work Council in Washington, D.C. He also worked summers at Woods Hole. After teaching biology at Carleton College and Knox College, in 1926 he came to Pomona College to teach one class each semester. He then lectured at Claremont Graduate School. During his career, he wrote or co-wrote 20 textbooks about biology or teaching it.

== Civic Biology and views ==
In Civic Biology, Hunter advocated both eugenics and segregation, writing that "If such people were lower animals, we would probably kill them off to prevent them from spreading. Humanity will not allow this, but we do have the remedy of separating the sexes in asylums or other places and in various ways preventing intermarriage and the possibilities of perpetuating such a low and degenerate race. Remedies of this sort have been tried successfully in Europe and are now meeting with success in this country."

His views in his textbooks included the viewpoint that there were five human races, ranked from inferior to superior, with those of Caucasian descent purported by Hunter to be "the highest type of all." While this was a relatively normal academic outlook in the 1920s, his inclusion of evolution in his textbooks proved highly controversial at the time, and led to lawsuits in Tennessee.
