= George Fitch (author) =

American author and politician

George H. Fitch
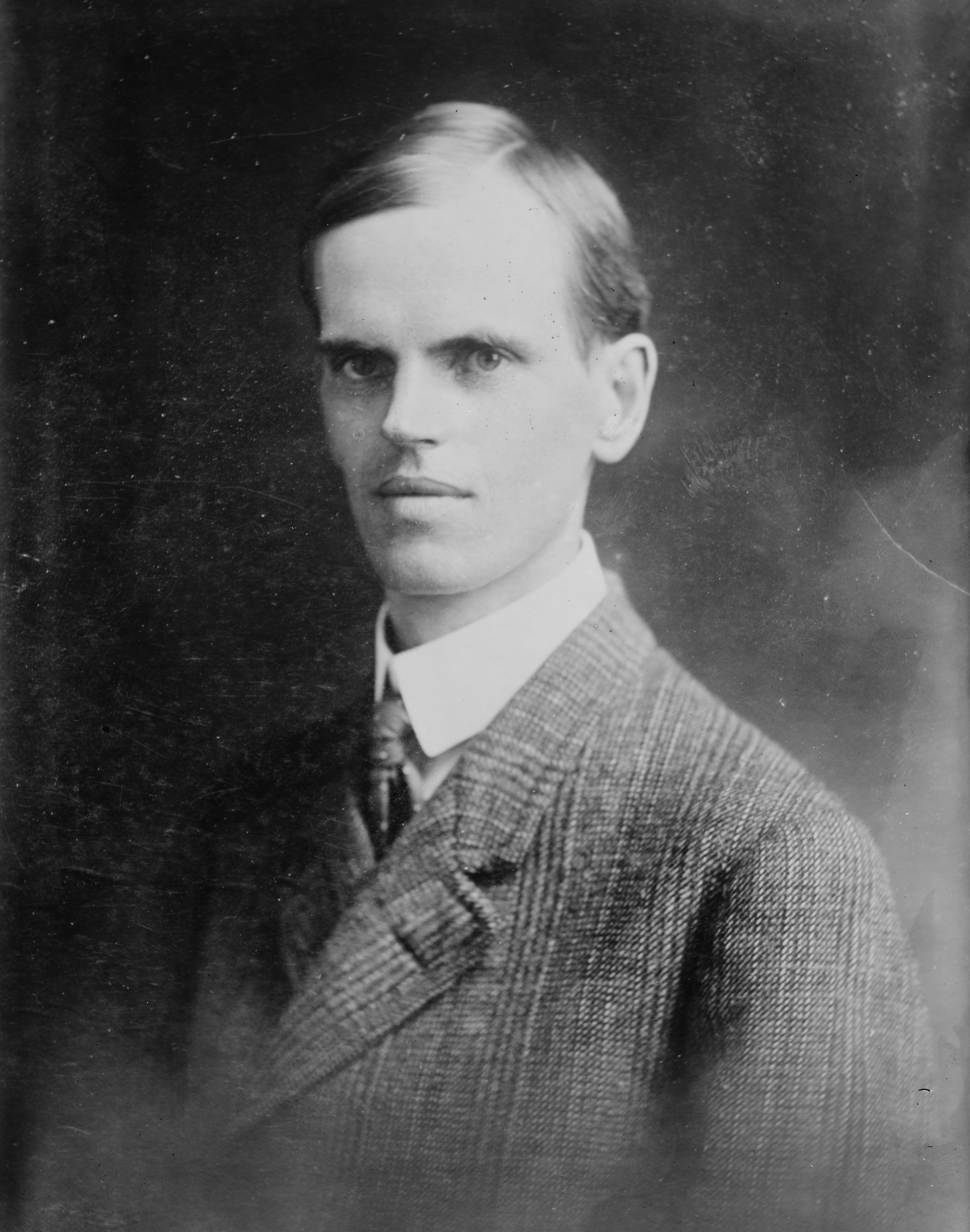
- Fitch circa 1915
- Born: June 5, 1877; Galva, Illinois
- Died: August 9, 1915 (age 38); San Francisco
- Occupations: Humorist, writer, journalist, Syndicated columnist
- Writing career
- Genre: Humor

George Helgesen Fitch (June 5, 1877 – August 9, 1915) was an American author, humorist, and journalist perhaps best known for his stories about fictional Siwash College.

== Biography ==
Fitch was born in Galva, Illinois. He was the eldest son of Elmer Eli Fitch, editor and publisher of the Galva News, and Rachel Helgesen, daughter of Thomas and Anna (Holverson) Helgesen. His grandfather, Thomas Helgesen, was a native of Norway who had immigrated to America in 1848.

Fitch graduated from Knox College in 1897. He worked as a reporter for a number of midwest newspapers including the Council Bluffs, Iowa Daily Nonpareil and the Peoria, Illinois Herald-Transcript. Eventually he became frequently published in national magazines, breaking in with his popular "Megaphone" series satirizing urban America. He also penned a syndicated column called "Vest Pocket Essays". By 1910, Fitch not only was a respected writer and editor, he became a nationally syndicated columnist for George Matthew Adams' news service. He was elected as a Progressive Party candidate to the Illinois House of Representatives in 1912.

Knox, his alma mater, was the basis of a series of popular stories set at "Good Old Siwash College". First appearing in the Saturday Evening Post in 1908, they focused on characters including football player Ole Skjarson and Petey Simmons, a coach who paid his "amateur" athletes as well as the fraternity Eta Bita Pie. The Siwash stories were the basis for the movie Those Were the Days! (1940) starring William Holden as Simmons, which was filmed on location at and around Knox College.

Fitch died of a ruptured appendix while visiting his sister Louise in California at the age of 38.

== Quotes ==
Fitch gave an early form of the adage "Journalism is the first rough draft of history":

A reporter is a young man who blocks out the first draft of history each day on a rheumatic typewriter.

See Wikiquote article for details.

== Selected works ==
- At Good Old Siwash (1910)
- Homeburg Memories (1915)
- Vest Pocket Essays (1916)
