= Those Were the Days! =

1940 film

- Directed by: Theodore Reed
- Written by: Don Hartman; George Fitch
- Produced by: Theodore Reed; William LeBaron
- Starring: William Holden; Bonita Granville
- Cinematography: Victor Milner
- Edited by: William Shea
- Music by: Victor Young
- Production company: Paramount
- Distributed by: Paramount
- Release date: July 14, 1940
- Running time: 74 Minute
- Country: United States
- Language: English

Those Were the Days! is a 1940 comedy film directed by Theodore Reed and starring William Holden and Bonita Granville.

== Plot ==
On their 35th wedding anniversary, Petey and Martha Simmons remember how they met in college.

Petey Simmons is a wealthy newcomer at college, so rival fraternities fight over him. His ego swells as fraternity boys and pretty girls bid for his time. At a school dance, Petey's shy roommate invited campus beauty Mirabel Allstairs to be his date. Petey ignores his own date, Martha Scroggs, dancing with other girls instead.

Petey, who had previously been arrested, pulls pranks on campus, such as changing a professor's clocks to delay an exam. A later act of vandalism leads to another arrest. The judge threatens to throw the book at him, sentencing him to six months in jail. Petey asks for a week's continuance before sentencing, then uses the time to court Martha when he discovers that she is the judge's daughter. When his scheme is revealed, Petey is locked in the town jail by the angry judge. However, Martha is smitten with him and is intentionally arrested so that she can occupy the cell next to Petey's, holding hands with him between the bars.

With the flashback completed and in the present day, the old judge still cannot believe how his daughter and son-in-law came together. They also hear that Petey Jr. has just been arrested, but the judge is not surprised.

== Cast ==
- William Holden as Petey
- Bonita Granville as Martha
- Judith Barrett as Mirabel
- Ezra Stone as Allie
- Vaughan Glaser as Judge Malachi Scroggs
- Lucien Littlefield as Professor Sillicocks
- Richard Denning as Briggs
- Phillip Terry as Ransom
- Tom Rutherford as Sam Byers
- Aldrich Bowker as Judge Spuire Jennings
- Emory Parnell as Jailer

Those Were the Days! is Barrett's final film; she retired from after completing work on the film.
