= Civic Biology =

Biology textbook by George William Hunter

A Civic Biology: Presented in Problems
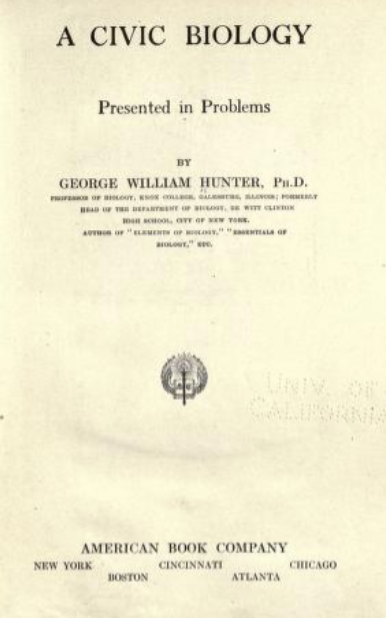
- Title page for A Civic Biology: Presented in Problems (1914)
- Author: George William Hunter
- Subject: Biology
- Genre: Academic textbook
- Publication date: 1914
- Publication place: United States

A Civic Biology: Presented in Problems (usually referred to as just Civic Biology) was a biology textbook written by George William Hunter, published in 1914. It is the book which the state of Tennessee required high school teachers to use in 1925 and is best known for its section about evolution that was ruled by a local court to be in violation of the state Butler Act. It was for teaching from this textbook that John T. Scopes was brought to trial in Dayton, Tennessee in the Scopes "Monkey" Trial. The views espoused in the book about evolution, race, and eugenics were common to American Progressives (especially in the work of Charles Benedict Davenport, one of the most prominent American biologists of the early 20th century, whom Hunter cites in the book).

== Excerpts ==
Excerpts from the book give its general tone and approach to controversial topics regarding mankind:

Evolution of Man. – Undoubtedly there once lived upon the earth races of men who were much lower in their mental organization than the present inhabitants. If we follow the early history of man upon the earth, we find that at first he must have been little better than one of the lower animals. He was a nomad, wandering from place to place, feeding upon whatever living things he could kill with his hands. Gradually he must have learned to use weapons, and thus kill his prey, first using rough stone implements for this purpose. As man became more civilized, implements of bronze and of iron were used. About this time the subjugation and domestication of animals began to take place. Man then began to cultivate the fields, and to have a fixed place of abode other than a cave. The beginnings of civilization were long ago, but even to-day the earth is not entirely civilized.

The Races of Man. – At the present time there exist upon the earth five races or varieties of man, each very different from the other in instincts, social customs, and, to an extent, in structure. These are the Ethiopian or negro type, originating in Africa; the Malay or brown race, from the islands of the Pacific; the American Indian; the Mongolian or yellow race, including the natives of China, Japan, and the Eskimos; and finally, the highest type of all, the Caucasians, represented by the civilized white inhabitants of Europe and America. ...

Improvement of Man. – If the stock of domesticated animals can be improved, it is not unfair to ask if the health and vigor of the future generations of men and women on the earth might not be improved by applying to them the laws of selection. This improvement of the future race has a number of factors in which we as individuals may play a part. These are personal hygiene, selection of healthy mates, and the betterment of the environment.

Eugenics. – When people marry there are certain things that the individual as well as the race should demand. The most important of these is freedom from germ diseases which might be handed down to the offspring. Tuberculosis, syphilis, that dread disease which cripples and kills hundreds of thousands of innocent children, epilepsy, and feeble-mindedness are handicaps which it is not only unfair but criminal to hand down to posterity. The science of being well born is called eugenics. ...

Parasitism and its Cost to Society. – Hundreds of families such as those described above exist today, spreading disease, immorality, and crime to all parts of this country. The cost to society of such families is very severe. Just as certain animals or plants become parasitic on other plants or animals, these families have become parasitic on society. They not only do harm to others by corrupting, stealing, or spreading disease, but they are actually protected and cared for by the state out of public money. Largely for them the poorhouse and the asylum exist. They take from society, but they give nothing in return. They are true parasites.

The Remedy. – If such people were lower animals, we would probably kill them off to prevent them from spreading. Humanity will not allow this, but we do have the remedy of separating the sexes in asylums or other places and in various ways preventing intermarriage and the possibilities of perpetuating such a low and degenerate race. Remedies of this sort have been tried successfully in Europe and are now meeting with some success in this country.

== Development and publication ==
Hunter was born in Mamaroneck, New York, and was educated at Williams College, the University of Chicago, and New York University, where he obtained his doctorate. He later became chairman of the biology department at his alma mater, De Witt Clinton High School, a public secondary school for boys in Manhattan. During his time at Clinton, he wrote or co-authored 30 textbooks for college and high school biology courses, including Civic Biology in 1905. By working with educators at Columbia University's Teachers College and the geneticist Thomas Hunt Morgan, Hunter developed Civic Biology, a textbook that shaped the modern secondary-school biology curriculum.

== Eugenics ==
In the first edition of Civic Biology, Hunter briefly discusses eugenics on one page of the 432 page textbook. Along with many other evolutionary biologists, Hunter embraced the idea of eugenics as a social doctrine, a popular idea in the early 20th century, in light if what several states had enacted laws to compel the sexual segregation and sterilization of people deemed eugenically unfit. Hunter believed that society could perfect the human race by preventing intermarriage between people such as the mentally ill, criminals, and epileptics. He also believed that the Caucasian race was the highest type of all the races.

== Shifts in science education ==
Charles Darwin had published his evolutionary theories 60 years before the public controversy over Civic Biology with the Scopes Trial. Prior to the Scopes Trial and controversy over Civic Biology, most science textbooks included Darwinian concepts in order to keep abreast with prevalent scientific ideas. In the early 20th century, there was a movement in the education sector to bring evolution into high school classrooms, in order to update and reshape how biology was taught. Once evolution began being taught in high schools, controversy over Darwin's theories developed. These efforts tried to incorporate progressive educational ideologies and apply the biological sciences to human society.

Civic Biology was an example of the new approaches to scientific instruction emerging in the education sector. This modern education focused on applying scientific principles to human society by developing applicable and relevant content for students. This movement towards socially applicable biology was coupled with national efforts towards mandatory public education. Anti-evolution efforts and legislation were responding to the redesigned ideologies in the new biology curricula, and also to the centralized control and regulation of education. Concerns about public and standardized education were part of the public debate over Civic Biology.

== Cultural context ==
Several socio-cultural events shaped the publication and reaction to Civic Biology. Following World War I, a cultural movement emerged that poised two ideological groups against each other: the traditionalists and the modernists. The modernists embraced intellectual experimentation by exploring new philosophies such as Freudian theories and advocated against alcohol prohibition in political spheres. In response to this modernist cultural movement, there was a religious revivalist movement to protest the emergence of these progressive ideologies. The traditionalists were distinguished by their religious zeal. This group favored alcohol prohibition laws and a literal interpretation of the Bible.

== Scopes Trial ==
The content of Civic Biology was not specifically discussed in the trial; rather the trial focused on the merits and problems with Darwin's theory of evolution. The Scopes Trial used Civic Biology as a tool to have a publicized and public debate on whether evolution should continue to be taught. The prosecution argued that teaching evolution undermined traditional religious values by disrupting the Biblical concept of a six-day creation, and claimed that Darwinian concepts could subvert the political sphere of the United States, saying that "survival of the fittest" could be used to justify a laissez-faire capitalist system, imperialism, and militarism in United States politics.They warned that Darwin's theories could be used to justify mass sterilization of livestock in order to selectively breed the best organisms. Prosecutors created arguments to demonstrate the dangers that teaching evolutionary theory could pose to society.

The defense crafted arguments that largely fit within a modernist ideology. They argued that evolution should be taught to high school students under the protection of freedom of speech. The defendants proposed a more liberal and innovative science curriculum be provided to students, one that keeps up with popular scientific ideas of the time. They believed that it was within the rights of teachers and students to decide whether to use Civic Biology, and advocated for a public education system that was independent of specific political, economic, and religious viewpoints.

== Legacy ==
The Scopes Trial, with its controversy over Civic Biology, was a major setback for anti-evolution groups because of the 15 states with anti-evolution legislation pending in 1925, only 2 enacted laws restricting the teaching of Darwin's evolutionary theories. While this public controversy had some political implications, it was not extensively influential in the education sector and the instruction of the biological sciences. During the 1970s, it was believed that pressure from Christian fundamentalists after the Scopes Trial forced textbook authors to limit the discussion of evolution. However, upon later examination of biology textbooks, scholars determined that textbook authors worked to develop biological curricula that differentiated and defended its content, in an attempt to reduce the influence of religious fundamentalism on the biological sciences. As a result, modern scholars now believe that overall, biology textbooks were not heavily influenced by anti-evolution rhetoric after the Scopes Trial.

While biology textbooks did not yield heavy influence from the Scopes Trial, some laws emerged that affected high school teachers. After the Scopes Trial, many teachers, particularly in the South, were then required to take oaths of loyalty. These oaths centered upon restricting instructors to teaching content that did not contradict traditionalist ideologies.

== New Civic Biology ==
A revised edition of Hunter's book appeared the year after the Scopes Trial. This edition no longer used the word "evolution", and removed most references to recognizably evolutionary concepts. A figure illustrating fossils of the precursors of horses in geological context and much of the associated text was eliminated. The section quoted above, "Evolution of Man", was renamed "Development of Man", and, rather than saying "lower in mental organization" said "lower in civilization" (page 250). The book did mention natural selection (page 383), homology (page 237), classification of plants and animals (Chapter XXI, pages 234–252) (including mention of "man" as a vertebrate, a mammal, and a primate, page 250), and had a short biography of Charles Darwin among the "Great Names in Biology" (pages 411–412).

This new edition contained an extended discussion of eugenics (Chapter XXXII "The Improvement of the Human Race", pp. 394–404), but the section quoted above on "The Remedy" removed the words "If such people were lower animals, we would probably kill them off to prevent them from spreading. Humanity will not allow this ...". (page 400). The supposed history of the Jukes family and the Kallikak family was advanced (pages 398–399). The section "Parasitism and its Cost to Society" was unchanged but for the insertion of the sentence "It is estimated that between 25% and 50% of all prisoners in penal institutions are feeble-minded." The new edition retained the section "The Races of Man" as written, with two changes about "caucasians": They were no longer described as "the highest type of all", and "the Hindus and Arabs of Asia" were included among the enumerated caucasians (page 251).
