= Kathryn Tanquary =

American juvenile fiction author

- Education: B.A. in Creative Writing
- Alma mater: Knox College
- Occupations: Writer; Editor for Edelman Japan
- Writing career
- Genre: Juvenile fiction
- Notable work: The Night Parade
- Website: kathryntanquary.com

Kathryn Tanquary is an American juvenile fiction author who lives and works in Japan. She is from Highlands Ranch, Colorado, and currently works as an editor for Edelman Japan.

Tanquary studied creative writing at Knox College, where she graduated from in 2010. At Knox College, she was listed as a distinguished student on the Dean's List and the President's Circle. After attaining her degree, Tanquary taught English as a Foreign Language to middle school students in the Gunma Prefecture of Japan.

In college, Tanquary wrote several short stories for adults. She has always been interested in Japanese folklore, which stimulated the concept for her debut novel, a juvenile fiction book titled The Night Parade, which won the 2016 Freeman Book Award for Young Adult/Middle School Literature. Soon after its January 2016 release, the author stated that she plans to release a new middle-grade series as well as an unrelated fantasy novel for adults.

She has written columns for Writer’s Digest and has been featured in several other publications. She is also an advocate for representation of diversity in juvenile and teen fiction.

Tanquary is represented by Thao Le of the Sandra Dijkstra Agency, and her debut novel was published through Sourcebooks Jabberwocky.
