= John Washington Butler =

American farmer and politician (1875–1953)

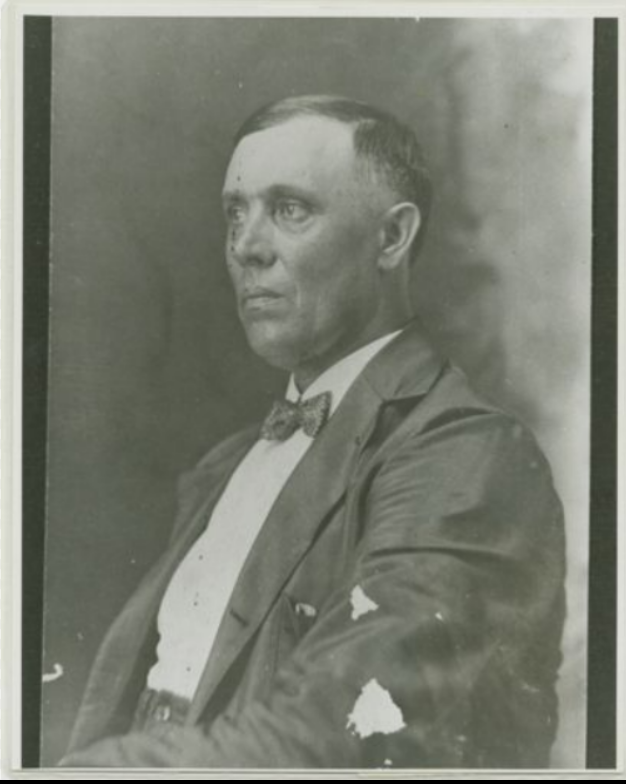
Butler in 1925.

John Washington Butler (December 17, 1875 – September 24, 1952) was an American farmer and a member of the Tennessee House of Representatives from 1923 to 1927, representing Macon, Trousdale, and Sumner counties. He is most noted for introducing the Butler Act, which prohibited teaching of evolution in public (i.e. state) schools (and which was challenged in the Scopes Trial). He was an admirer of William Jennings Bryan.

According to Butler,

In the first place, the Bible is the foundation upon which our American Government is built. ... The evolutionist who denies the Biblical story of creation, as well as other Biblical accounts, cannot be a Christian. ... It goes hand in hand with Modernism, makes Jesus Christ a fakir, robs the Christian of his hope and undermines the foundation of our Government ...

== See also ==
- Creation and evolution in public education
