= Maynard M. Metcalf =

American biologist and professor

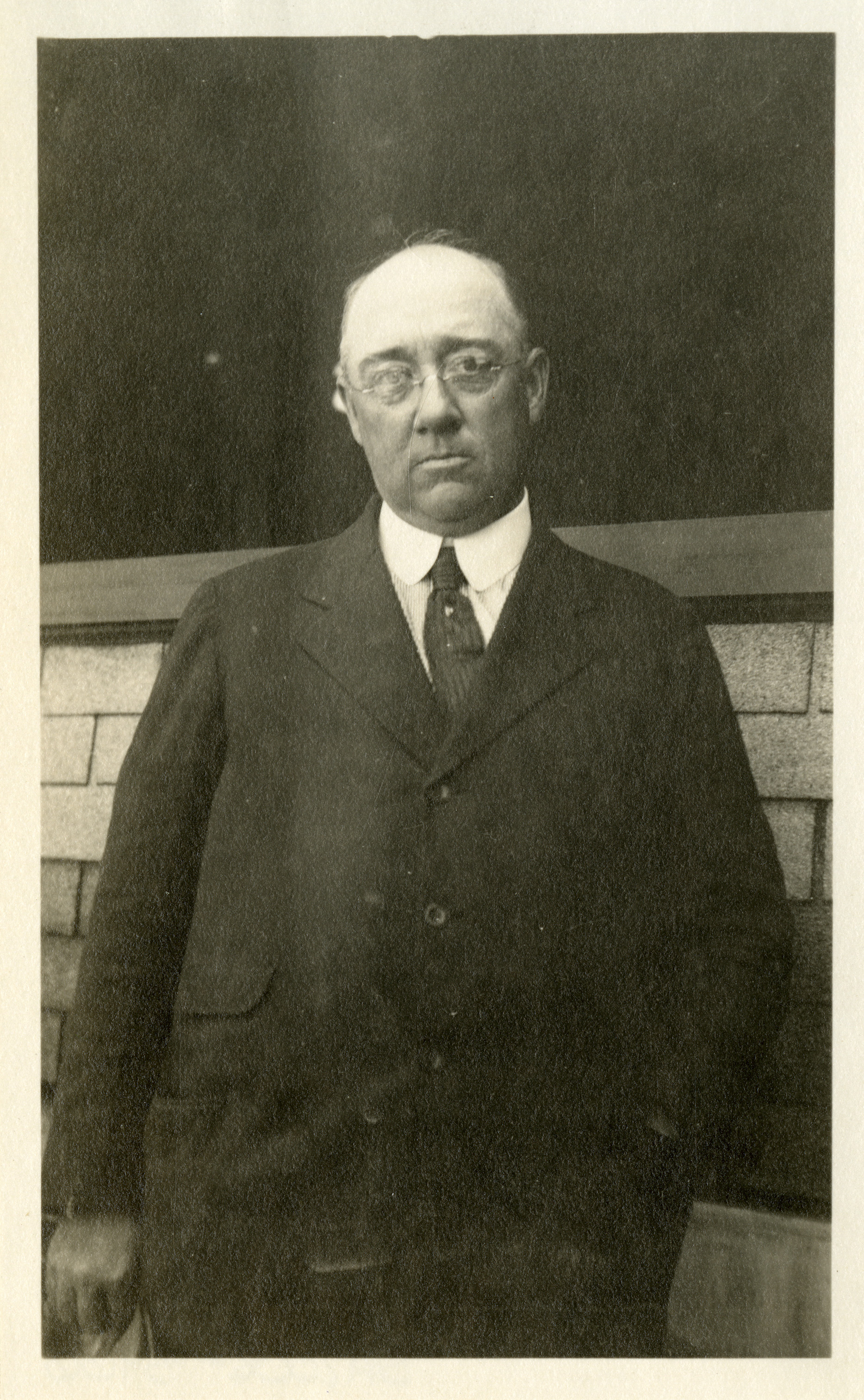
Professor Metcalf (Smithsonian Archives)

Maynard Mayo Metcalf (12 March 1868 – 19 April 1940) was an American biologist and a professor of zoology at Johns Hopkins University. He was the only biologist who was allowed to testify in the Scopes Trial. Metcalf specialized in protozoal parasites which he examined in a wide range of hosts and was especially interested in the Opalinidae.

== Life and work ==
Metcalf was born in Elyria, Ohio, to Eliab Wight and Eliza Mary (née Ely) Metcalf. The family was of English ancestry and an early settler had been a tapestry manufacturer. He was educated at Oberlin College, receiving a BA (1889) and later a ScD (1914). His doctoral research (1893) was at Johns Hopkins University under W. K. Brooks. He then taught at the Goucher Women's College until 1906 after which he joined Oberlin College. He spent two years in Europe, first at Wurzburg with Theodor Boveri, then in Berlin followed by some time at the Naples Biological Station. He left Oberlin in 1914 and began private research at La Jolla, California until 1924. He spent two years at the National Research Council and from 1926 to 1933 he was a research associate with the rank of professor of zoology at Johns Hopkins University.

Metcalf's main areas of interest were the biology and development of gastropods and tunicates (including salps), with a later focus on the protozoa. He supported the idea of orthogenetic evolution and directed mutations. He also supported the view that the distribution of related organisms with disjunct distributions could be explained the existence of former land bridges and argued with examples of some amphibian distributions (based on the relatedness of protozoan parasites, he claimed that the Leptodactylidae of South America were related to frogs in Australasia) on the basis of ideas proposed by William Diller Matthew aided by his supposed phylogeny of the protozoan parasites of the amphibians.

=== Scopes trial ===
In 1925, Metcalf was an expert witness called to testify in the Scopes trial. He called himself "frankly Christian" but supported at least some aspects of evolution. When asked what he thought about Bishop Ussher's origin of life estimate of 6,000 years, he suggested that he would prefer "a very modest guess" of 600,000,000 years. H. L. Mencken who was then reporting on the case for the Baltimore Evening Sun noted that Metcalf's testimony was a most succinct and eloquent support for evolution, he stated that "A word or two and he was howling down the wind. Another and he hauled up to discharge a broadside. There was no cocksureness in him. Instead, he was rather cautious and deprecatory and sometimes he halted and confessed his ignorance. But what he got over when he finished was a superb counterblast to the fundamentalist buncombe." Metcalf was critical of a literal interpretation of the scriptures and believed that there was a way to balance Christian thought and science without having to discard the teaching of evolution. In 1934, Metcalf wrote an essay on examples of what he claimed supported "intelligent design".

== Personal life ==
Metcalf married Ella Wilder in 1890 and they had a daughter. While at Woodshole, he suffered a stroke and lived in Florida until his death four years later.
