= Scopes trial =

1925 US legal case in Tennessee

Tennessee vs Scopes
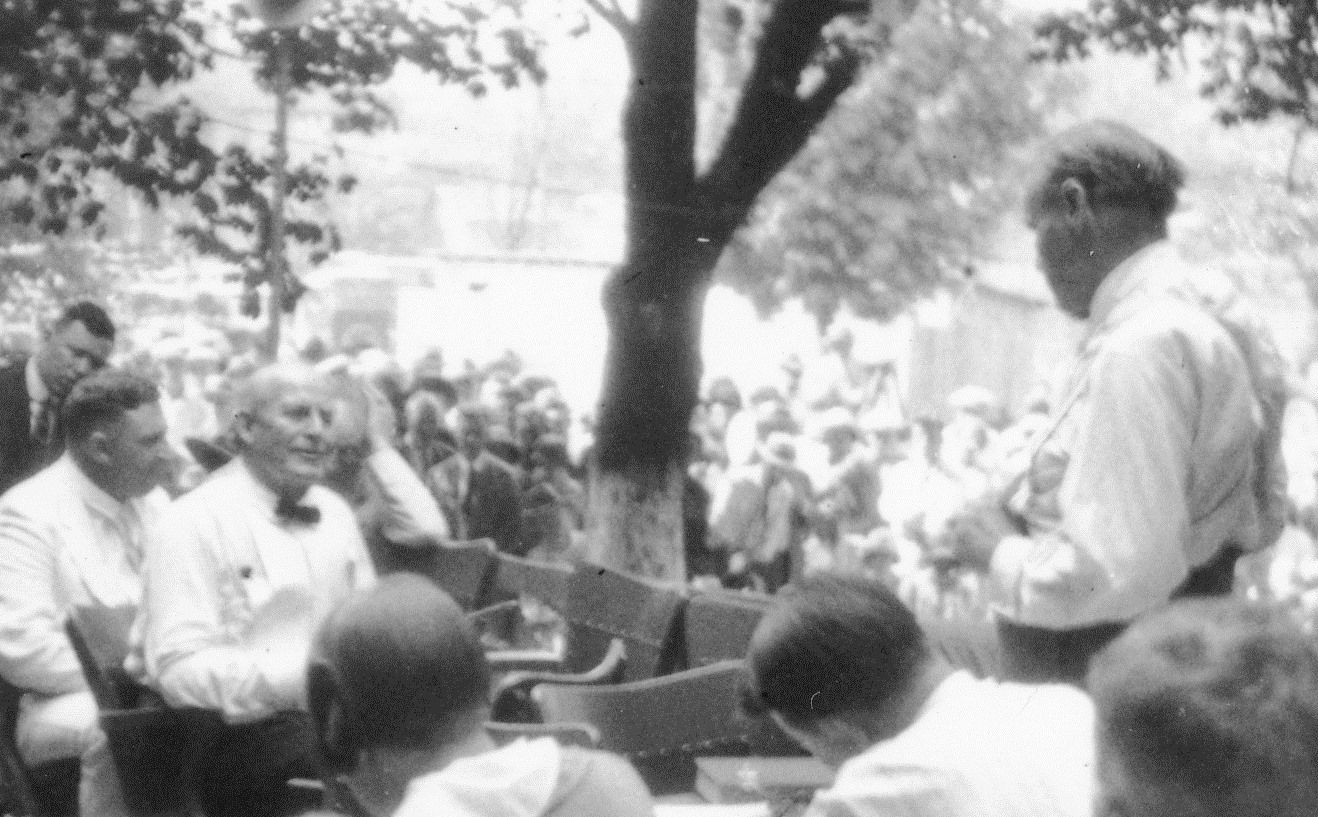
- On the trial's seventh day, proceedings were moved outdoors because of excessive heat. William Jennings Bryan (seated, left) is being questioned by Clarence Darrow.
- Court: Criminal Court of Tennessee
- Full case name: The State of Tennessee vs. John Thomas Scopes
- Decided: July 21, 1925; 101 years ago
- Verdict: Guilty (overturned on technicality)
- Citation: None

Case history
- Subsequent action: Scopes v. State (1926)

Court membership
- Judge sitting: John Tate Raulston

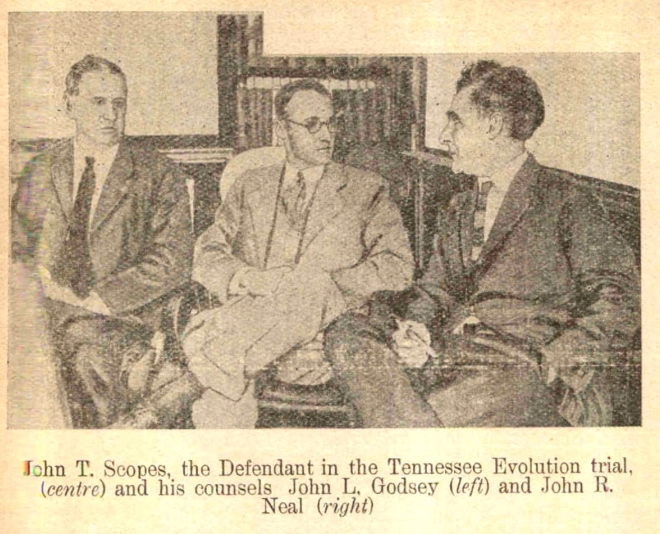
John T. Scopes and his legal counsels

The State of Tennessee v. John Thomas Scopes, also known as the Scopes Monkey Trial, was an American legal case from July 10 to July 21, 1925, in which a high school teacher, John T. Scopes, was accused of violating the Butler Act, a Tennessee state law which outlawed the teaching of human evolution in public schools. The trial was deliberately staged in order to attract publicity to the small town of Dayton, Tennessee, where it was held. Scopes was unsure whether he had ever actually taught evolution, but he incriminated himself deliberately so the case could have a defendant. Scopes was represented by the American Civil Liberties Union, which had offered to defend anyone accused of violating the Butler Act in an effort to challenge the constitutionality of the law.

Scopes was found guilty and was fined $100 (equivalent to $1908 in 2026), but the verdict was overturned on a technicality. William Jennings Bryan, a three-time presidential candidate and former secretary of state, argued for the prosecution, while famed labor and criminal lawyer Clarence Darrow served as the principal defense attorney for Scopes. The trial publicized the fundamentalist–modernist controversy, which set modernists, who believed evolution could be consistent with religion, against fundamentalists, who believed the word of God as revealed in the Bible took priority over all human knowledge. The case was thus seen both as a theological contest and as a trial on whether evolution should be taught in schools. The trial became a symbol of the larger social anxieties associated with the cultural changes and modernization that characterized the 1920s in the United States. It also served its purpose of drawing intense national publicity and highlighted the growing influence of mass media, having been covered by news outlets around the country and being the first trial in American history to be nationally broadcast by radio.

== Background and origins ==
=== Evolution and Butler Act ===
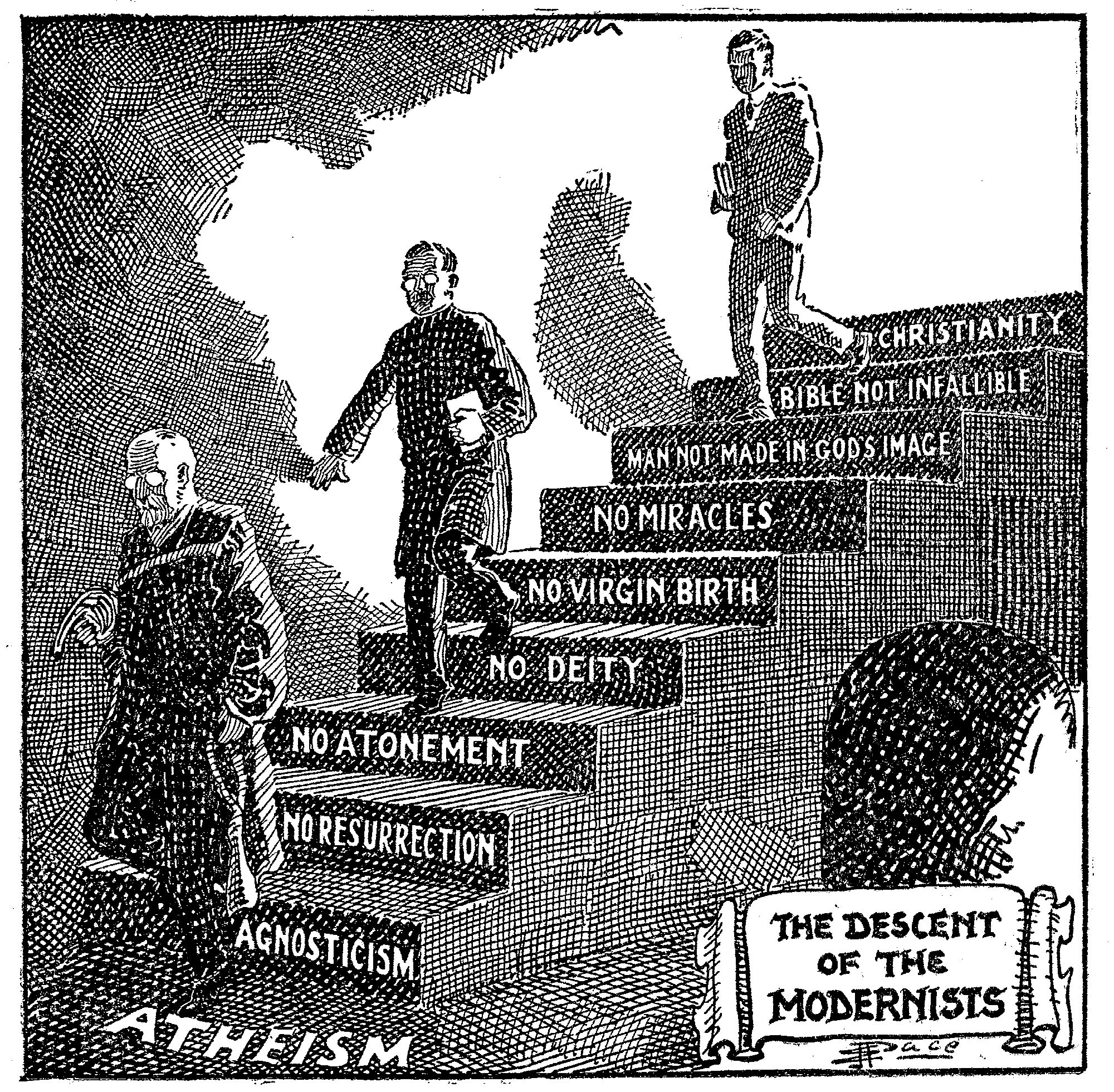
A Christian fundamentalist cartoon by E. J. Pace from 1922 portraying modernism as the descent from Christianity to atheism

In the mid-19th century, English naturalists Charles Darwin and Alfred Russel Wallace independently developed the theory that populations evolve over the course of generations through a process of natural selection, and that all life on earth is descended from a common ancestor. Their work was jointly published in 1858, and further expanded upon the following year in Darwin's book On the Origin of Species. As knowledge of the theory began to spread over the succeeding decades, many Christian denominations came to accept the theory, believing the creation narrative in the Book of Genesis to be an allegory that was not intended to be interpreted literally. Nevertheless, a number of Christian groups came to reject the theory, believing that the Bible was inerrant and should be interpreted literally and that evolution implied that humans did not have a special place in the universe. Some were also critical of the applications of natural selection to sociology, economics, and politics, which became known as Social Darwinism. In the early 20th century, a schism known as the Fundamentalist–modernist controversy arose within American Protestant Christianity, especially Presbyterianism, in response to the cultural, scientific, and technological developments of the time. Fundamentalists insisted on the literal inerrancy of Scripture and rejected interpretations that contradicted biblical accounts, while modernists sought to reconcile faith with scientific advancements, including evolutionary theory.

Tennessee State Representative John Washington Butler, a Tennessee farmer and head of the World Christian Fundamentals Association, lobbied state legislatures to pass anti-evolution laws. He introduced the Butler Act, which prohibited the teaching of human evolution in public schools in Tennessee. Butler later stated, "I didn't know anything about evolution ... I'd read in the papers that boys and girls were coming home from school and telling their fathers and mothers that the Bible was all nonsense." On March 21, 1925, Tennessee governor Austin Peay signed the bill to gain support among rural legislators, but believed the law would neither be enforced nor interfere with education in Tennessee schools. William Jennings Bryan, who had been campaigning against the teaching of evolution in public schools, thanked Peay enthusiastically for the bill, stating "The Christian parents of the state owe you a debt of gratitude for saving their children from the poisonous influence of an unproven hypothesis." In response, the American Civil Liberties Union (ACLU) financed a test case by offering to defend anyone accused of teaching the theory of evolution in defiance of the Butler Act.

=== Planning ===
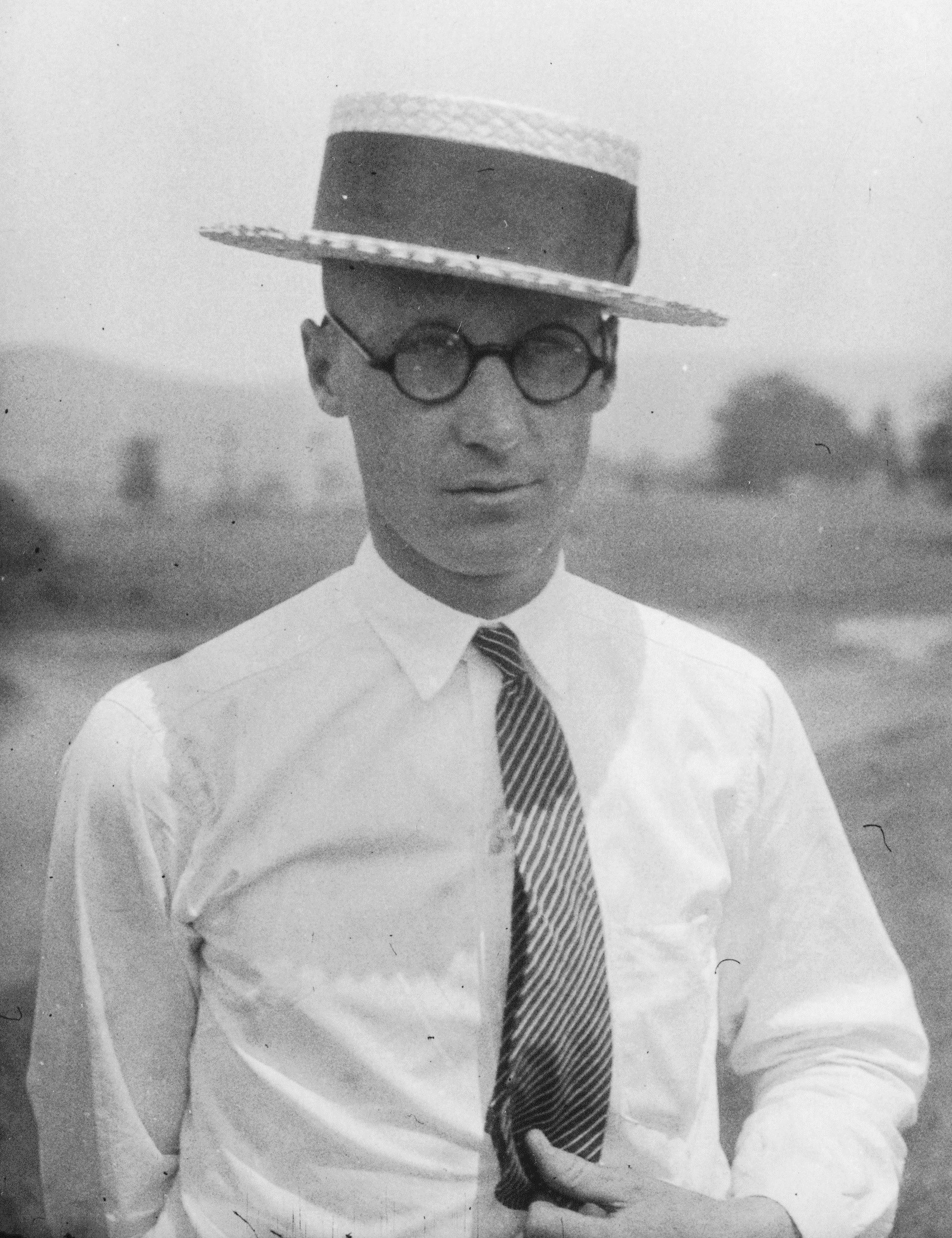
John T. Scopes in 1925

On April 5, 1925, George Rappleyea, the local manager for the Cumberland Coal and Iron Company, arranged a meeting with county superintendent of schools Walter White and local attorney Sue K. Hicks at Robinson's Drug Store in Dayton, convincing them that the controversy of such a trial would give Dayton much needed publicity. According to Robinson, Rappleyea said "As it is, the law is not enforced. If you win, it will be enforced. If I win, the law will be repealed. We're game, aren't we?" The men then summoned 24-year-old John T. Scopes, a Dayton high school science and math teacher. The group asked Scopes, who had substituted for the regular biology teacher, to admit to teaching the theory of evolution.

Rappleyea pointed out that, while the Butler Act prohibited the teaching of the theory of evolution, the state required teachers to use George William Hunter's textbook, Civic Biology: Presented in Problems, which explicitly described and endorsed the theory of evolution, as well as scientific racism and eugenics; and that teachers were, therefore, effectively required to break the law. Scopes mentioned that while he could not remember whether he had actually taught evolution in class, he had, however, gone through the evolution chart and respective chapter with the class. He told the group that he would be willing to stand trial if they could prove that he had taught evolution and could qualify as a defendant.

Scopes urged students to testify against him and coached them in their answers. Judge John T. Raulston accelerated the convening of the grand jury and "... all but instructed the grand jury to indict Scopes, despite the meager evidence against him and the widely reported stories questioning whether the willing defendant had ever taught evolution in the classroom". Scopes was charged on May 5 and indicted on May 25 for teaching from the chapter on evolution to a high school class in violation of the Butler Act, after three students testified against him to the grand jury. One student afterwards told reporters: "I believe in part of evolution, but I don't believe in the monkey business." Scopes was nominally arrested, though he was never actually detained. Paul Patterson, owner of The Baltimore Sun, put up $500 in bail for Scopes. The original prosecutors were Herbert E. and Sue K. Hicks, two brothers who were local attorneys and friends of Scopes, but the prosecution was ultimately led by Tom Stewart, the district attorney for the 18th Circuit who later became a U.S. Senator from Tennessee. Stewart was aided by Dayton attorney Gordon McKenzie, who supported the anti-evolution bill on religious grounds, and described evolution as "detrimental to our morality" and an assault on "the very citadel of our Christian religion."

Hoping to attract major press coverage, Rappleyea went so far as to write to British novelist H. G. Wells asking him to join the defense team. Wells replied that he had no legal training in Britain, let alone in America, and declined the offer. John R. Neal, a law school professor from Knoxville, announced that he would act as Scopes' attorney whether Scopes liked it or not, and he became the nominal head of the defense team. Baptist pastor William Bell Riley, the founder and president of the World Christian Fundamentals Association, was instrumental in calling lawyer and three-time Democratic presidential nominee, former United States Secretary of State, and lifelong Presbyterian William Jennings Bryan to act as that organization's counsel. Bryan had originally been invited by Sue Hicks to become an associate of the prosecution and Bryan had readily accepted, despite the fact he had not tried a case in thirty-six years. As Scopes pointed out to James Presley in the book Center of the Storm, on which the two collaborated: "After [Bryan] was accepted by the state as a special prosecutor in the case, there was never any hope of containing the controversy within the bounds of constitutionality."

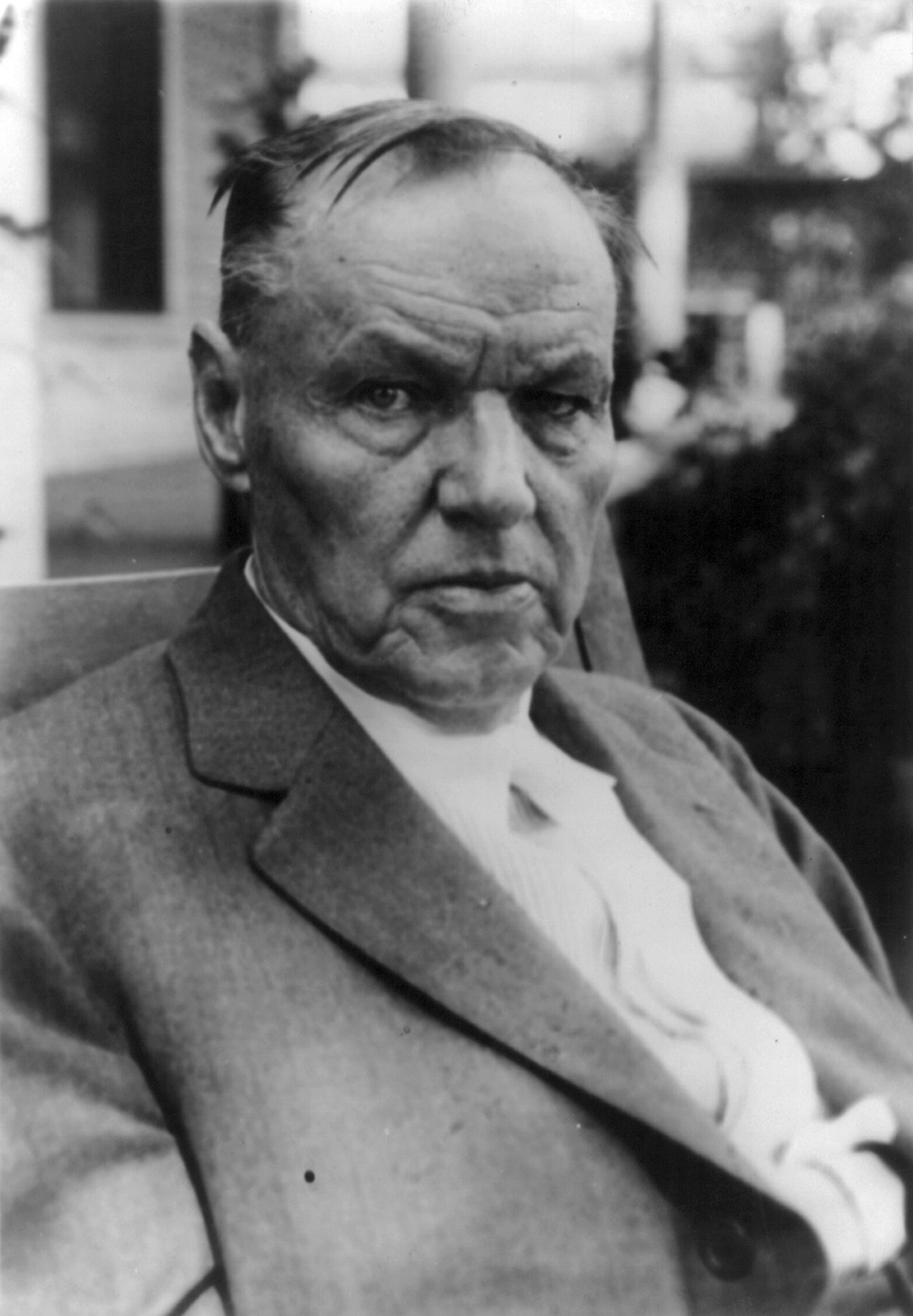
Clarence Darrow in 1925, during the trial

Following the recruitment of Bryan, Clarence Darrow approached John Neal of the defense team and offered his services. Neal accepted, without consulting the rest of the team or the defendant himself. The ACLU had been seeking out an addition to the defense that would parallel Bryan's political experience, but had previously indicated that they did not want Darrow involved out of concern that his staunch agnosticism would imperil the defense team's case. Darrow later claimed he was motivated to join the defense after he "realized there was no limit to the mischief that might be accomplished unless the country was aroused to the evil at hand". After many changes back and forth, the defense team consisted of Darrow; ACLU attorney Arthur Garfield Hays; Dudley Field Malone, an international divorce lawyer who had worked at the State Department; W. O. Thompson, who was Darrow's law partner; and F. B. McElwee. The defense was also assisted by librarian and Biblical authority Charles Francis Potter, who was a modernist Unitarian preacher, and Leon Milton Birkhead, a humanist Unitarian preacher.

== Proceedings ==
The ACLU had originally intended to oppose the Butler Act on the grounds that it violated the teacher's individual rights and academic freedom, and was therefore unconstitutional. Principally because of Clarence Darrow, this strategy changed as the trial progressed. The earliest argument proposed by the defense once the trial had begun was that there was actually no conflict between evolution and the creation account in the Bible; later, this viewpoint would be called theistic evolution. In support of this claim, they brought in eight experts on evolution. But other than Maynard Metcalf, a zoologist from Johns Hopkins University, the judge would not allow these experts to testify in person. Instead, they were allowed to submit written statements so their evidence could be used at the appeal. In response to this decision, Darrow made a sarcastic comment to Judge Raulston (as he often did throughout the trial) on how he had been agreeable only on the prosecution's suggestions. Darrow apologized the next day, keeping himself from being found in contempt of court.

The presiding judge, John T. Raulston, was accused of being biased towards the prosecution and frequently clashed with Darrow. At the outset of the trial, Raulston quoted Genesis and the Butler Act. He also warned the jury not to judge the merit of the law (which would become the focus of the trial) but on the violation of the Act, which he called a 'high misdemeanor'. The jury foreman himself was unconvinced of the merit of the Act but he acted, as did most of the jury, on the instructions of the judge.

Bryan chastised evolution for teaching children that humans were but one of 3,500 types of mammals and bemoaned the notion that human beings were descended "Not even from American monkeys, but from old world monkeys".

Dudley Field Malone responded for the defense in a speech that was universally considered the oratorical climax of the trial. Arousing fears of "inquisitions", Malone argued that the Bible should be preserved in the realm of theology and morality and not put into a course of science. In his conclusion, Malone declared that Bryan's "duel to the death" against evolution should not be made one-sided by a court ruling that took away the chief witnesses for the defense. Malone promised there would be no duel because "there is never a duel with the truth." (Note: This quote, and indeed this speech, was delivered by Darrow's co-counsel, Dudley Field Malone. Contemporary author Anna Marcet Haldeman specifically states, in "Impressions of the Scopes Trial" (1925), "Never, for instance, would Darrow be betrayed, even by his own eloquence, into saying as did Malone: 'There is never a duel with the truth.'") The courtroom went wild when Malone finished; Scopes declared Malone's speech to be the dramatic high point of the entire trial and insisted that part of the reason Bryan wanted to go on the stand was to regain some of his tarnished glory.

=== Examination of Bryan ===
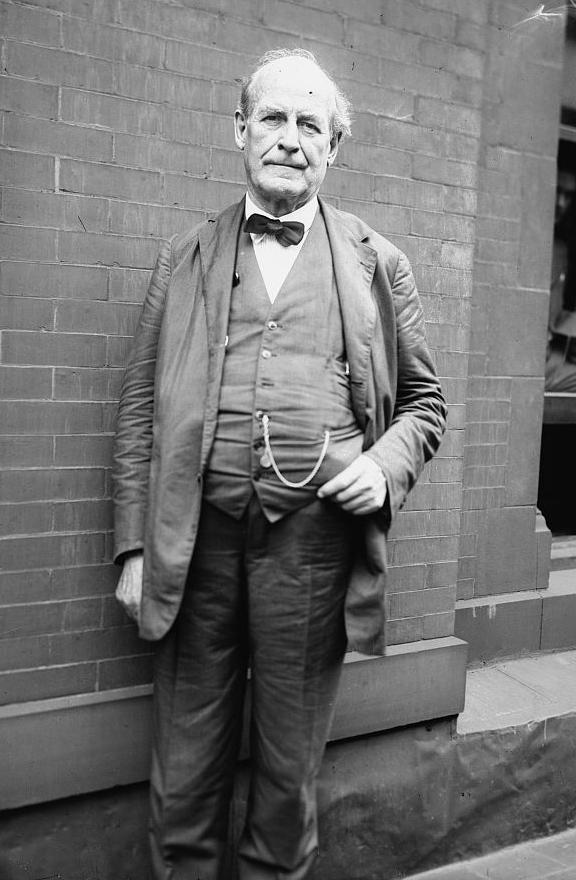
William Jennings Bryan, c. 1925

On the sixth day of the trial, the defense ran out of witnesses. The judge declared that all the defense testimony on the Bible was irrelevant and should not be presented to the jury. On the seventh day of the trial, Darrow took the unorthodox step of calling Bryan, counsel for the prosecution, as a witness to question him on the Bible as an expert, since their own experts had been rendered irrelevant. Bryan himself (according to a journalist reporting the trial) never made a claim of being an expert, although he did tout his knowledge of the Bible. Although Hays would claim in his autobiography that the examination of Bryan was unplanned, Darrow spent the night before in preparation. The scientists the defense had brought to Dayton—and Charles Francis Potter, a modernist minister who had engaged in a series of public debates on evolution with the fundamentalist preacher John Roach Straton—prepared topics and questions for Darrow to address to Bryan on the witness stand. Kirtley Mather, chairman of the geology department at Harvard and also a devout Baptist, played Bryan and answered questions as he believed Bryan would. This testimony revolved around several questions regarding Biblical stories and Bryan's beliefs (as shown below); this testimony culminated in Bryan declaring that Darrow was using the court to "slur the Bible" while Darrow replied that Bryan's statements on the Bible were "foolish".

==== Adam and Eve ====
An area of questioning involved the book of Genesis, including questions about whether Eve was actually created from Adam's rib, where Cain got his wife, and how many people lived in Ancient Egypt. Darrow used these examples to suggest that the stories of the Bible could not be scientific and should not be used in teaching science, telling Bryan, "You insult every man of science and learning in the world because he does not believe in your fool religion." Bryan's declaration in response was "The reason I am answering is not for the benefit of the superior court. It is to keep these gentlemen from saying I was afraid to meet them and let them question me, and I want the Christian world to know that any atheist, agnostic, unbeliever, can question me anytime as to my belief in God, and I will answer him."

Stewart objected for the prosecution, demanding to know the legal purpose of Darrow's questioning. Bryan, gauging the effect the session was having, snapped that its purpose was "to cast ridicule on everybody who believes in the Bible". Darrow, with equal vehemence, retorted "We have the purpose of preventing bigots and ignoramuses from controlling the education of the United States."

When Darrow asked where Cain got his wife, Bryan answered that he would "leave the agnostics to hunt for her". When Darrow addressed the issue of the temptation of Eve by the serpent, Bryan insisted that the Bible be quoted verbatim rather than allowing Darrow to paraphrase it in his own terms. However, after another angry exchange, Judge Raulston banged his gavel, adjourning the court.

==== End of the trial ====
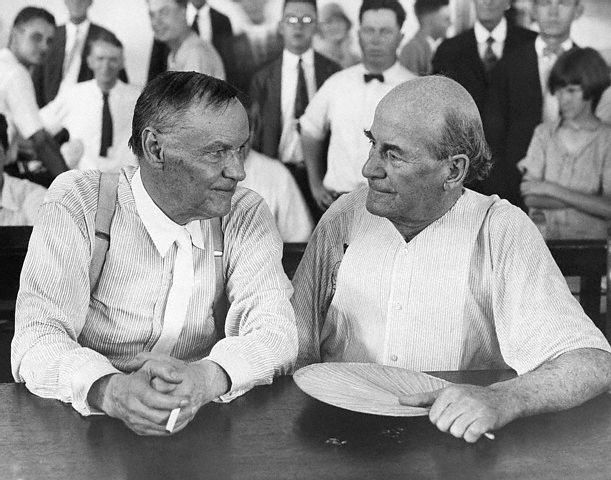
Darrow (left) and Bryan (right) during the trial

Raulston had adjourned court to the stand on the courthouse lawn, ostensibly because he was "afraid of the building" with so many spectators crammed into the courtroom, but probably because of the stifling heat. The confrontation between Bryan and Darrow lasted approximately two hours on the afternoon of the seventh day of the trial. It is likely that it would have continued the following morning but for Judge Raulston's announcement that he considered the whole examination irrelevant to the case and his decision that it should be "expunged" from the record. Thus Bryan was denied the chance to cross-examine the defense lawyers in return, although after the trial Bryan would distribute nine questions to the press to bring out Darrow's "religious attitude". The questions and Darrow's short answers were published in newspapers the day after the trial ended, with The New York Times characterizing Darrow as answering Bryan's questions "with his agnostic's creed, 'I don't know,' except where he could deny them with his belief in natural, immutable law".

After the defense's final attempt to present evidence was denied, Darrow asked the judge to bring in the jury only to have them come to a guilty verdict:

We claim that the defendant is not guilty, but as the court has excluded any testimony, except as to the one issue as to whether he taught that man descended from a lower order of animals, and we cannot contradict that testimony, there is no logical thing to come except that the jury find a verdict that we may carry to the higher court, purely as a matter of proper procedure. We do not think it is fair to the court or counsel on the other side to waste a lot of time when we know this is the inevitable result and probably the best result for the case.

After they were brought in, Darrow then addressed the jury:

We came down here to offer evidence in this case and the court has held under the law that the evidence we had is not admissible, so all we can do is to take an exception and carry it to a higher court to see whether the evidence is admissible or not ... we cannot even explain to you that we think you should return a verdict of not guilty. We do not see how you could. We do not ask it.

Darrow closed the case for the defense without a final summation. Under Tennessee law, when the defense waived its right to make a closing speech, the prosecution was also barred from summing up its case, preventing Bryan from presenting his prepared summation.

Scopes never testified since there was never a factual issue as to whether he had taught evolution. Scopes later admitted that, in reality, he was unsure of whether he had taught evolution (another reason the defense did not want him to testify), but the point was not contested at the trial.

Bryan's summation of the Scopes trial, which was distributed to reporters but not read in court, read:

Science is a magnificent force, but it is not a teacher of morals. It can perfect machinery, but it adds no moral restraints to protect society from the misuse of the machine. It can also build gigantic intellectual ships, but it constructs no moral rudders for the control of storm-tossed human vessel. It not only fails to supply the spiritual element needed but some of its unproven hypotheses rob the ship of its compass and thus endanger its cargo. In war, science has proven itself an evil genius; it has made war more terrible than it ever was before. Man used to be content to slaughter his fellowmen on a single plane, the earth's surface. Science has taught him to go down into the water and shoot up from below and to go up into the clouds and shoot down from above, thus making the battlefield three times as bloody as it was before; but science does not teach brotherly love. Science has made war so hellish that civilization was about to commit suicide; and now we are told that newly discovered instruments of destruction will make the cruelties of the late war seem trivial in comparison with the cruelties of wars that may come in the future. If civilization is to be saved from the wreckage threatened by intelligence not consecrated by love, it must be saved by the moral code of the meek and lowly Nazarene. His teachings, and His teachings alone, can solve the problems that vex the heart and perplex the world.

After eight days of trial, it took the jury only nine minutes to deliberate. Scopes was found guilty on July 21 and ordered by Raulston to pay a $100 fine (equivalent to $1,800 in 2025). Raulston imposed the fine before Scopes was given an opportunity to say anything about why the court should not impose punishment upon him, and, after Neal brought the error to the judge's attention, the defendant spoke for the first and only time in court:

Your honor, I feel that I have been convicted of violating an unjust statute. I will continue in the future, as I have in the past, to oppose this law in any way I can. Any other action would be in violation of my ideal of academic freedom—that is, to teach the truth as guaranteed in our constitution, of personal and religious freedom. I think the fine is unjust.

Bryan died suddenly five days after the trial's conclusion. When he learned of the death Mencken said "Well, we killed the son of a bitch."

== Appeal to the Supreme Court of Tennessee ==
Scopes's lawyers appealed, challenging the conviction on several grounds. First, they argued that the statute was overly vague because it prohibited the teaching of "evolution", a very broad term. The court rejected that argument, holding:

Evolution, like prohibition, is a broad term. In recent bickering, however, evolution has been understood to mean the theory which holds that man has developed from some pre-existing lower type. This is the popular significance of evolution, just as the popular significance of prohibition is prohibition of the traffic in intoxicating liquors. It was in that sense that evolution was used in this act. It is in this sense that the word will be used in this opinion, unless the context otherwise indicates. It is only to the theory of the evolution of man from a lower type that the act before us was intended to apply, and much of the discussion we have heard is beside this case.

Second, the lawyers argued that the statute violated Scopes' constitutional right to free speech because it prohibited him from teaching evolution. The court rejected this argument, holding that the state was permitted to regulate his speech as an employee of the state:

He was an employee of the state of Tennessee or of a municipal agency of the state. He was under contract with the state to work in an institution of the state. He had no right or privilege to serve the state except upon such terms as the state prescribed. His liberty, his privilege, his immunity to teach and proclaim the theory of evolution, elsewhere than in the service of the state, was in no wise touched by this law.

Third, it was argued that the terms of the Butler Act violated the Tennessee State Constitution, which provided that "It shall be the duty of the General Assembly in all future periods of this government, to cherish literature and science." The argument was that the theory of the descent of man from a “lower order of animals” was now established by the preponderance of scientific thought, and that the prohibition of the teaching of such theory was a violation of the legislative duty to cherish science. The court rejected this argument, holding that the determination of what laws cherished science was an issue for the legislature, not the judiciary:

The courts cannot sit in judgment on such acts of the Legislature or its agents and determine whether or not the omission or addition of a particular course of study tends to cherish science.

Fourth, the defense lawyers argued that the statute violated the provisions of the Tennessee Constitution that prohibited the establishment of a state religion. The Religious Preference provisions of the Tennessee Constitution (Section 3 of Article I) stated, "no preference shall ever be given, by law, to any religious establishment or mode of worship".

Writing for the court two sittings and one year after receiving the appeal, Chief Justice Grafton Green rejected this argument, holding that the Tennessee Religious Preference clause was designed to prevent the establishment of a state religion as had been the experience in England and Scotland at the writing of the Constitution, and held:

We are not able to see how the prohibition of teaching the theory that man has descended from a lower order of animals gives preference to any religious establishment or mode of worship. So far as we know, there is no religious establishment or organized body that has in its creed or confession of faith any article denying or affirming such a theory. So far as we know, the denial or affirmation of such a theory does not enter into any recognized mode of worship. Since this cause has been pending in this court, we have been favored, in addition to briefs of counsel and various amici curiae, with a multitude of resolutions, addresses, and communications from scientific bodies, religious factions, and individuals giving us the benefit of their views upon the theory of evolution. Examination of these contributions indicates that Protestants, Catholics, and Jews are divided among themselves in their beliefs, and that there is no unanimity among the members of any religious establishment as to this subject. Belief or unbelief in the theory of evolution is no more a characteristic of any religious establishment or mode of worship than is belief or unbelief in the wisdom of the prohibition laws. It would appear that members of the same churches quite generally disagree as to these things.

Further, the court held that while the statute forbade the teaching of evolution (as the court had defined it), it did not require teaching any other doctrine and thus did not benefit any one religious doctrine or sect over others.

Nevertheless, having found the statute to be constitutional, the court set aside the conviction on appeal because of a legal technicality: the jury should have decided the fine, not the judge, since under the state constitution, Tennessee judges could not at that time set fines above $50, and the Butler Act specified a minimum fine of $100.

Justice Green added a totally unexpected recommendation:

The court is informed that the plaintiff in error is no longer in the service of the state. We see nothing to be gained by prolonging the life of this bizarre case. On the contrary, we think that the peace and dignity of the state, which all criminal prosecutions are brought to redress, will be the better conserved by the entry of a nolle prosequi herein. Such a course is suggested to the Attorney General.

Attorney General L. D. Smith immediately announced that he would not seek a retrial, while Scopes' lawyers offered angry comments on the stunning decision.

In 1968, the Supreme Court of the United States ruled in Epperson v. Arkansas that such bans contravene the Establishment Clause of the First Amendment because their primary purpose is religious. Tennessee had repealed the Butler Act the previous year.

== Media coverage and publicity ==
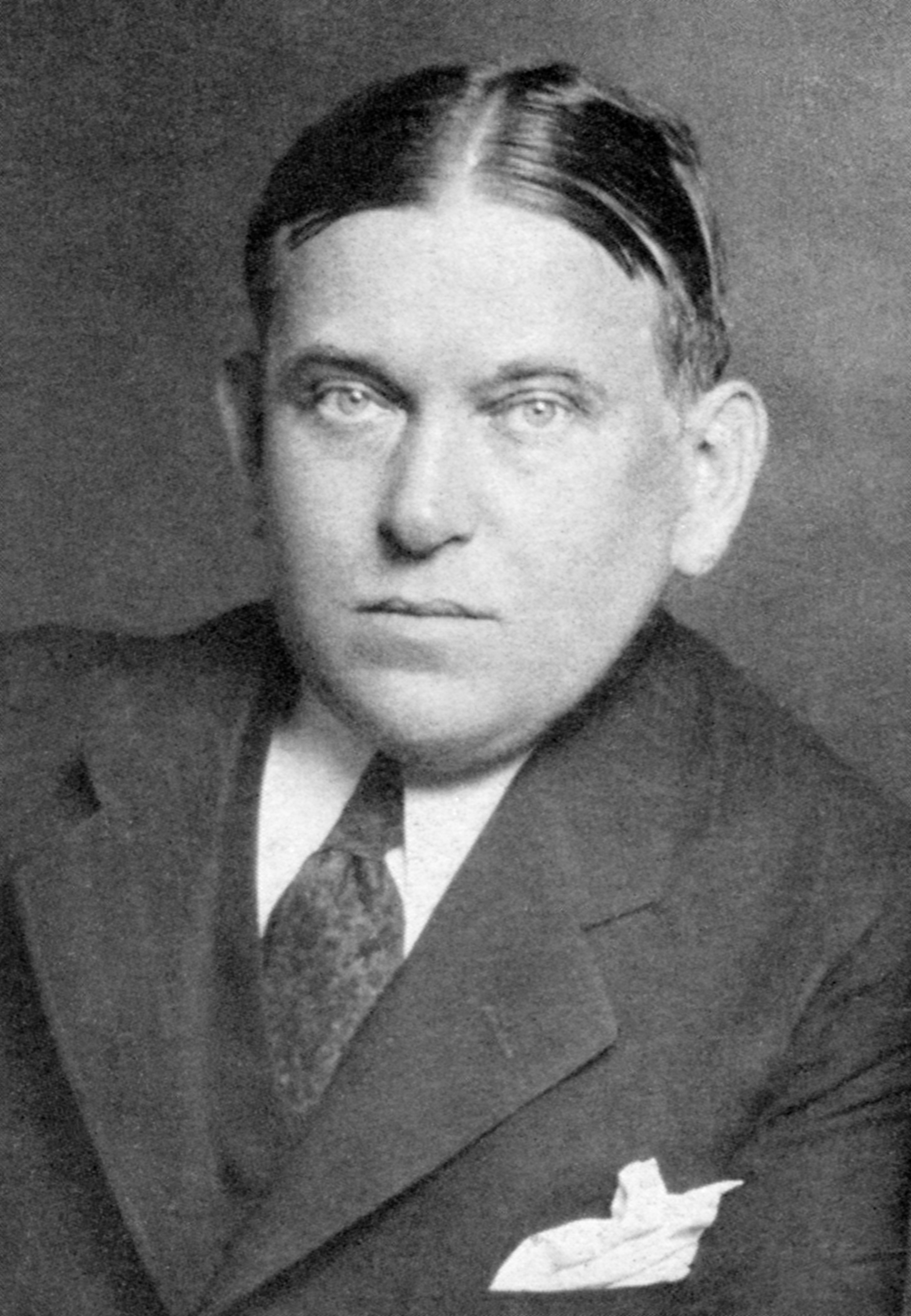
H. L. Mencken in 1928

The trial was front-page news all over the country, including this newspaper in Washington, D.C. Darrow was cited for contempt (at the time) and details on the many scientists that weren't allowed to testify.

External videos
- Booknotes interview with Edward Larson on Summer for the Gods, June 28, 1998, C-SPAN

The Scopes trial was covered by journalists from the South and around the world, including H. L. Mencken for The Baltimore Sun, which was also paying part of the defense's expenses. It was Mencken who provided the trial with its most colorful labels such as the "Monkey Trial" of "the infidel Scopes". It was also the first United States trial to be broadcast on national radio. Edward J. Larson, a historian who won the Pulitzer Prize for History for his book Summer for the Gods: The Scopes Trial and America's Continuing Debate Over Science and Religion (2004), notes: "Like so many archetypal American events, the trial itself began as a publicity stunt." The press coverage of the "Monkey Trial" was overwhelming. The trial served its intention to bring publicity to the town of Dayton. From The Salem Republican, June 11, 1925:

The whole matter has assumed the portion of Dayton and her merchants endeavoring to secure a large amount of notoriety and publicity with an open question as to whether Scopes is a party to the plot or not.

The front pages of major newspapers including The New York Times were dominated by the case for days. More than 200 newspaper reporters from all parts of the country and two from London were in Dayton. Twenty-two telegraphers sent out 165,000 words per day on the trial, thousands of miles of telegraph wires were hung for the purpose; more words were transmitted to Britain about the Scopes trial than for any previous American event. Chicago's WGN radio station broadcast the trial with announcer Quin Ryan via clear-channel broadcasting first on-the-scene coverage of the criminal trial. Two movie cameramen had their film flown out daily in a small plane from a specially prepared airstrip. The event became known as the "Trial of the Century", and has been described as the most-covered trial in American history, with only the murder trial of O. J. Simpson 69 years later receiving comparable coverage.

H.L. Mencken's trial reports were vituperative and heavily slanted against the prosecution and the jury, which he described as "unanimously hot for Genesis". He mocked the town's inhabitants as "Babbits", "yokels", "morons", "peasants", "hill-billies", and "yaps", and called Bryan a "buffoon" and his speeches "theologic bilge". He chastised the "degraded nonsense which country preachers are ramming and hammering into yokel skulls". In contrast, he called the defense "eloquent" and "magnificent". Even today, some American creationists, fighting in courts and state legislatures to demand that creationism be taught on an equal footing with evolution in the schools, have claimed that it was Mencken's trial reports in 1925 that turned public opinion against creationism. The media's portrayal of Darrow's cross-examination of Bryan, and the play and movie Inherit the Wind (1960), have been credited with causing millions of Americans to ridicule religious-based opposition to the theory of evolution.

Mencken, however, did enjoy certain aspects of Dayton, writing

The town, I confess, greatly surprised me. I expected to find a squalid Southern village, with darkies snoozing on the horse-blocks, pigs rooting under the houses and the inhabitants full of hookworm and malaria. What I found was a country town full of charm and even beauty—a somewhat smallish but nevertheless very attractive Westminster or Balair.

Mencken described Rhea County as priding itself on a kind of tolerance or what he called "lack of Christian heat", opposed to outside ideas but without hating those who held them. He pointed out that the Ku Klux Klan did not have a foothold locally, despite its power throughout much of the state. Mencken attempted to perpetrate a hoax, distributing flyers for the "Rev. Elmer Chubb", but the claims that Chubb would drink poison and preach in lost languages were ignored as commonplace by the people of Dayton, and only Commonweal magazine bit. Mencken continued to attack Bryan, including in his withering obituary of Bryan, "In Memoriam: W.J.B.", in which he charged Bryan with "insincerity"—not for his religious beliefs but for the inconsistent and contradictory positions he took on a number of political questions during his career. Years later, Mencken did question whether dismissing Bryan "as a quack pure and unadulterated" was "really just". Mencken's columns made the Dayton citizens irate and drew general indignation from the Southern press. After Raulston ruled against the admission of scientific testimony, Mencken left Dayton, declaring in his last dispatch "All that remains of the great cause of the State of Tennessee against the infidel Scopes is the formal business of bumping off the defendant." Consequently, the journalist missed Darrow's cross-examination of Bryan on Monday.

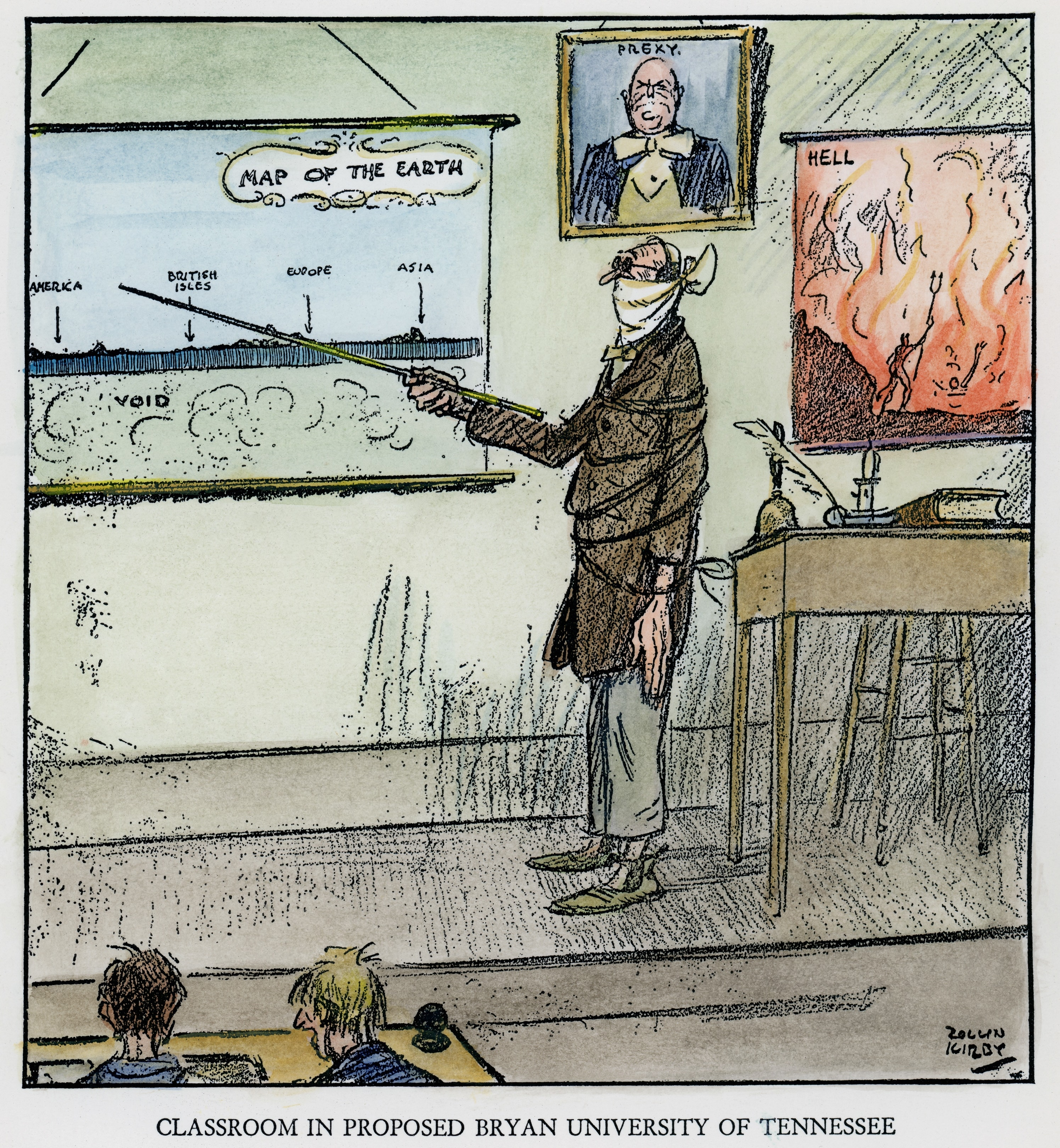
Cartoonist Rollin Kirby depicts fundamentalist education in Tennessee taken to an extreme

Anticipating that Scopes would be found guilty, the press fitted the defendant for martyrdom and created an onslaught of ridicule, and hosts of cartoonists added their own portrayals to the attack. Time magazine's initial coverage of the trial focused on Dayton as "the fantastic cross between a circus and a holy war". Life magazine adorned its masthead with monkeys reading books and proclaimed "the whole matter is something to laugh about." Both Literary Digest and the popular humor magazine Life (1890–1930) ran compilations of jokes and humorous observations garnered from newspapers around the country. American Experience has published a gallery of such cartoons written about the trial, and 14 such cartoons are also reprinted in L. Sprague de Camp's The Great Monkey Trial.

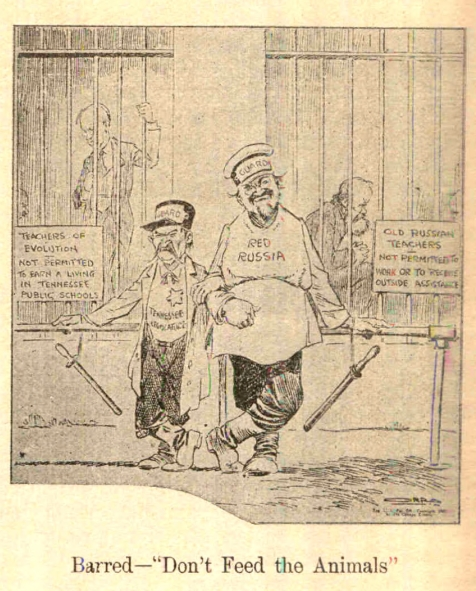
Cartoon published in India's Modern Review

Overwhelmingly, the butt of these jokes was the prosecution and those aligned with it: Bryan, the city of Dayton, the state of Tennessee, and the entire South, as well as fundamentalist Christians and anti-evolutionists. Rare exceptions were found in the Southern press, where the fact that Darrow had saved Leopold and Loeb from the death penalty continued to be a source of ugly humor. The most widespread form of this ridicule was directed at the inhabitants of Tennessee. Life described Tennessee as "not up to date in its attitude to such things as evolution". Attacks on Bryan were also frequent and acidic. Life awarded him its "Brass Medal of the Fourth Class" for having "successfully demonstrated by the alchemy of ignorance hot air may be transmuted into gold, and that the Bible is infallibly inspired except where it differs with him on the question of wine, women, and wealth". Time magazine related Bryan's arrival in town with the disparaging comment "The populace, Bryan's to a moron, yowled a welcome."

In addition to the media frenzy, the trial also attracted various individuals looking to capitalize on the spectacle and generate attention. The presence of these opportunistic individuals, seeking to exploit the public interest in the trial for their own gain, further contributed to the circuslike atmosphere. The trial attracted vendors, who sold food, drinks, Bibles, anti-evolution books, stuffed monkeys, and other trial souvenirs. Religious signs were placed through the town, and the courthouse square was also frequented by street preachers and anti-evolution advocates, including evangelist T.T. Martin. Joe Mendi, a trained chimpanzee who had performed in theater and films, was brought to Dayton and performed on the courthouse lawn.

== Aftermath and legacy ==
=== Creation versus evolution debate ===
The trial revealed a growing chasm in American Christianity and two ways of finding truth, one "biblical" and one "evolutionist". Author David Goetz writes that the majority of Christians denounced evolution at the time. Adam Shapiro criticized the view that the Scopes trial was an essential and inevitable conflict between religion and science, claiming that such a view was "self-justifying". Instead, Shapiro emphasizes the fact that the Scopes trial was the result of particular circumstances, such as politics postponing the adoption of new textbooks.

Historian Randall Balmer argues that the Scopes trial and Bryan's death resulted in a decline in the influence of Christian fundamentalists in American politics. While a subculture of evangelical organizations developed over the succeeding decades, conservative Protestants were not mobilized into a distinct voting bloc and were in effect politically inactive. It was not until the rise of the Christian right in the late 1970s that conservative fundamentalists became politically active and powerful again. However, author Mark Edwards contests the conventional view that in the wake of the Scopes trial, a humiliated fundamentalism retreated into the political and cultural background, a viewpoint which is evidenced in the 1955 play Inherit the Wind (and subsequent 1960 film), which fictionalized the trial, as well as in the majority of contemporary historical accounts. Rather, the cause of fundamentalism's retreat was the death of its leader, Bryan. Most fundamentalists saw the trial as a victory rather than a defeat, but Bryan's death soon after it created a leadership void that no other fundamentalist leader could fill. Bryan, unlike the other leaders, brought name recognition, respectability, and the ability to forge a broad-based coalition of fundamentalist and mainline religious groups which argued in defense of the anti-evolutionist position.

=== Anti-evolution movement ===
The trial escalated the political and legal conflict in which strict creationists and scientists struggled over the teaching of evolution in Arizona and California science classes. Before the Dayton trial only the South Carolina, Oklahoma, and Kentucky legislatures had dealt with anti-evolution laws or riders to educational appropriations bills. After Scopes was convicted, creationists throughout the United States sought similar anti-evolution laws for their states.

By 1927, there were 13 states, both in the North and in the South, that had deliberated over some form of anti-evolution law. At least 41 bills or resolutions were introduced into the state legislatures, with some states facing the issue repeatedly. Nearly all these efforts were rejected, but Mississippi and Arkansas did put anti-evolution laws on the books after the Scopes trial, laws that would outlive the Butler Act, which was repealed in 1967. In 1968, the United States Supreme Court ruled in Epperson v. Arkansas that laws prohibiting the teaching of evolution violated the Establishment Clause of the First Amendment.

In the Southwest, anti-evolution crusaders included ministers R. S. Beal and Aubrey L. Moore in Arizona and members of the Creation Research Society in California. They sought to ban evolution as a topic for study in the schools or, failing that, to relegate it to the status of unproven hypothesis perhaps taught alongside the biblical version of creation. Educators, scientists, and other distinguished laymen favored evolution. This struggle occurred later in the Southwest than elsewhere, finally collapsing in the Sputnik era after 1957, when the national mood inspired increased trust for science in general and for evolution in particular during the height of the Cold War.

The opponents of evolution made a transition from the anti-evolution crusade of the 1920s to the creation science movement of the 1960s. Despite some similarities between these two causes, the creation science movement represented a shift from overtly religious to covertly religious objections to evolutionary theory—sometimes described as a Wedge Strategy—raising what it claimed was scientific evidence in support of a literal interpretation of the Bible. Creation science also differed in terms of popular leadership, rhetorical tone, and sectional focus. It lacked a prestigious leader like Bryan, utilized pseudoscientific rather than religious rhetoric, and was a product of California and Michigan instead of the South.

=== Teaching of science ===
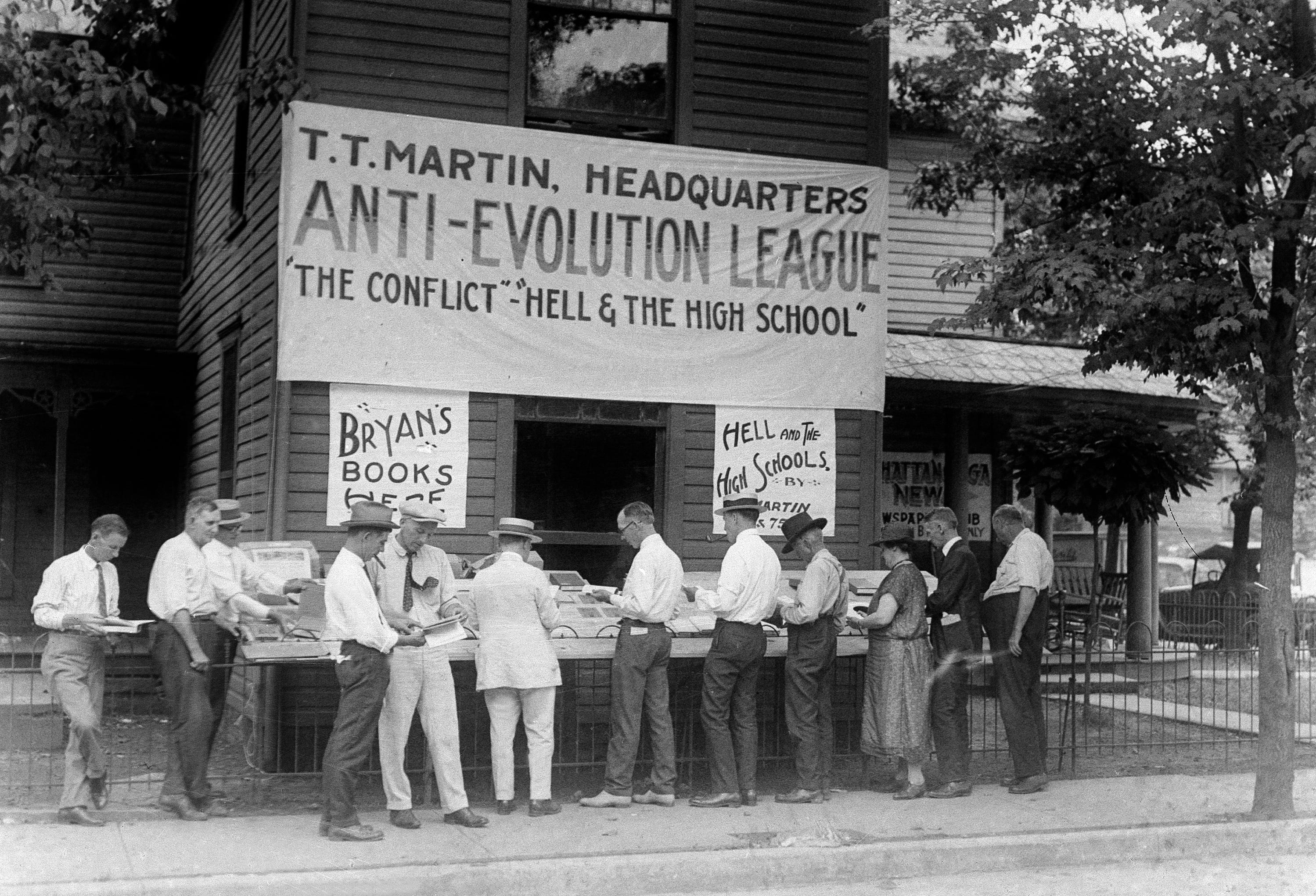
Anti-Evolution League, at the Scopes Trial, July 25, 1925

The Scopes trial had both short and long-term effects in the teaching of science in schools in the United States. Though often portrayed as influencing public opinion against fundamentalism, the victory was not complete. Though the ACLU had taken on the trial as a cause, in the wake of Scopes' conviction they were unable to find more volunteers to take on the Butler law and, by 1932, had given up. The anti-evolutionary legislation was not challenged again until 1965, and in the meantime, William Jennings Bryan's cause was taken up by a number of organizations, including the Bryan Bible League and the Defenders of the Christian Faith.

The effects of the Scopes trial on high school biology texts has not been unanimously agreed upon by scholars. Of the most widely used textbooks after the trial, only one included the word evolution in its index; the relevant page includes biblical quotations. Some scholars have accepted that this was the result of the Scopes trial: for example Hunter, the author of the biology text which Scopes was on trial for teaching, revised the text by 1926 in response to the Scopes trial controversy. However, George Gaylord Simpson challenged this notion as confusing cause and effect, and instead posited that the trend of anti-evolution movements and laws that provoked the Scopes Trial was also to blame for the removal of evolution from biological texts, and that the trial itself had little effect. The fundamentalists' target slowly veered off evolution in the mid-1930s. Miller and Grabiner suggest that as the anti-evolutionist movement died out, biology textbooks began to include the previously removed evolutionary theory. This also corresponds to the emerging demand that science textbooks be written by scientists rather than educators or education specialists.

This account of history has also been challenged. In Trying Biology Robert Shapiro examines many of the eminent biology textbooks in the 1910s and 1920s, and finds that while they may have avoided the word evolution to placate anti-evolutionists, the overall focus on the subject was not greatly diminished, and the books were still implicitly evolution-based. It has also been suggested that the narrative of evolution being removed from textbooks due to religious pressure, only to be reinstated decades later, was an example of "Whig history" propagated by the Biological Sciences Curriculum Study, and that the shift in the ways biology textbooks discussed evolution can be attributed to other race and class based factors.

In 1958, during the height of the Cold War, the National Defense Education Act was passed with the encouragement of many legislators who feared the United States education system was falling behind that of the Soviet Union. The act yielded textbooks, produced in cooperation with the American Institute of Biological Sciences, which stressed the importance of evolution as the unifying principle of biology. The new educational regime was not unchallenged. The greatest backlash was in Texas where attacks were launched in sermons and the press. Complaints were lodged with the State Textbook Commission. However, in addition to federal support, a number of social trends had turned public discussion in favor of evolution. These included increased interest in improving public education, legal precedents separating religion and public education, and continued urbanization in the South. This led to a weakening of the backlash in Texas, as well as to the repeal of the Butler law in Tennessee in 1967.

== In popular culture ==
=== Stage, film, and television ===
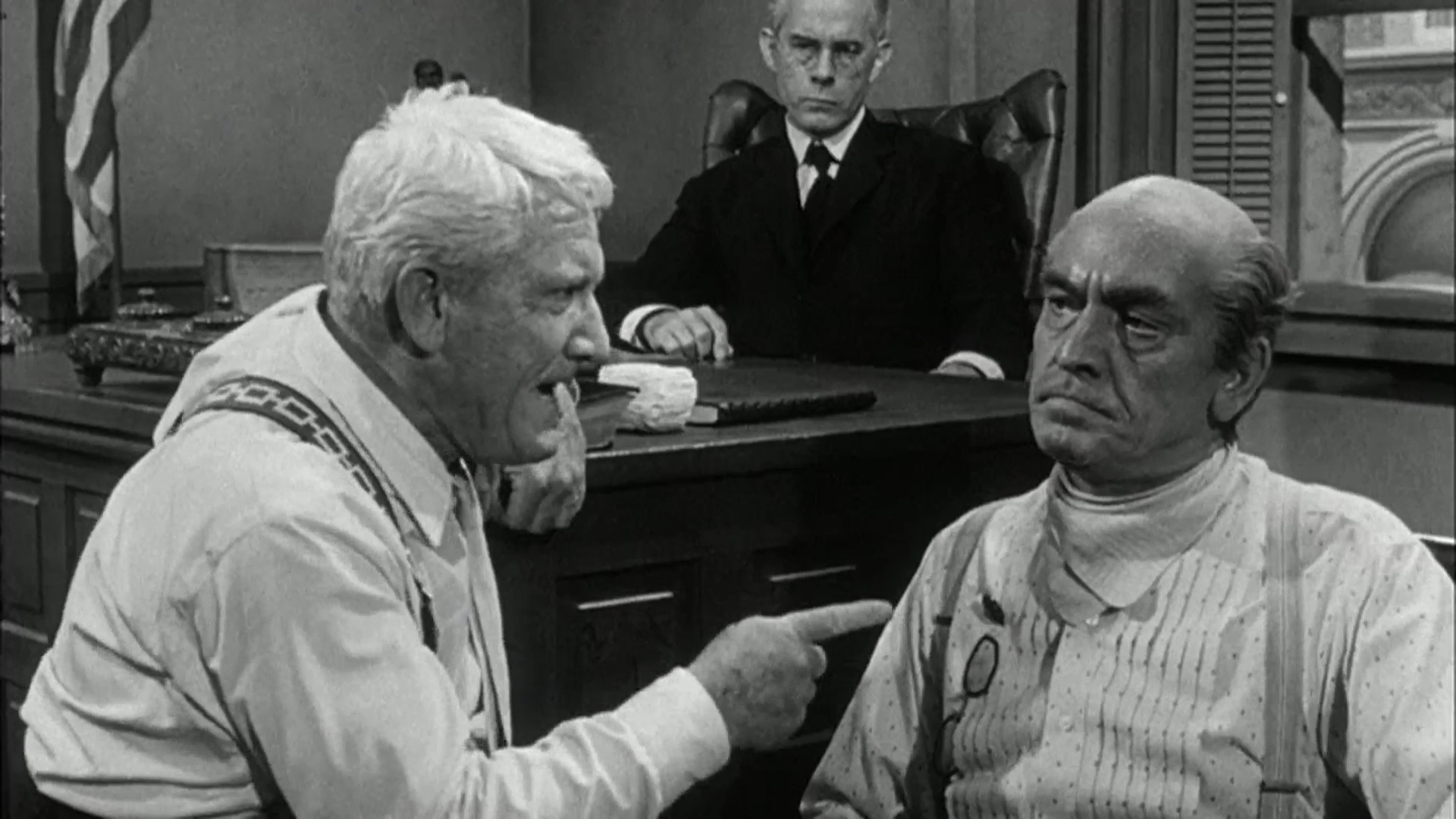
Spencer Tracy (left) as Darrow surrogate Henry Drummond, and Fredric March (right) as Bryan surrogate Matthew Harrison Brady in the trailer for the film Inherit the Wind; Harry Morgan (in the background) plays the judge.

Jerome Lawrence and Robert Edwin Lee's 1955 play Inherit the Wind fictionalizes the Scopes trial as a means of discussing the then-contemporary McCarthy trials. It portrays Darrow and Bryan as characters who are named Henry Drummond and Matthew Harrison Brady, respectively. In a note at the opening of the play, the playwrights state that it is not meant to be a historical account, and there are numerous instances where events were substantially altered or invented. Despite the disclaimer in the play's preface that the trial was its "genesis" but it is "not history", the play has largely been accepted as history by much of the public. (Lawrence and Lee later said that it was written in response to McCarthyism and was chiefly about intellectual freedom.)

The play was adapted into a 1960 film directed by Stanley Kramer, with Spencer Tracy as Drummond and Fredric March as Brady. Although there are numerous changes in the plot, they include more of the actual events of the trial, such as when Darrow implied that the court was prejudiced, being cited for contempt of court for his comments, and his subsequent statement of contrition that persuaded the judge to drop the charge. While the film largely received positive reviews from critics, it has been criticized by many residents of Dayton for its historical inaccuracies and depiction of the town's residents as overzealous Christian fundamentalists. There have also been three television adaptations of the play, with Melvyn Douglas and Ed Begley in 1965, Jason Robards and Kirk Douglas in 1988, and Jack Lemmon and George C. Scott in 1999.

Gale Johnson's play Inherit the Truth (1987), based on the original transcripts of the case, was written as a rebuttal of the 1955 play and the 1960 film. This play was performed yearly during the Dayton Scopes Festival until it ended its run in 2009. In 2007 Bryan College purchased the rights to the production and began work on a student film version of the play, which was screened at that year's Scopes Festival. Peter Goodchild's 1993 play, The Great Tennessee Monkey Trial, was based on original sources and transcripts of the Scopes trial, as it was written with the goal of being historically accurate. It was produced as part of L.A. Theatre Works' Relativity Series, which features science-themed plays and receives major funding from the Alfred P. Sloan Foundation. According to Audiofile Magazine, which pronounced this production the 2006 D.J.S. Winner of AudioFile Earphones Award: "Because there are no recordings of the actual trial, this production is certainly the next best thing." The BBC broadcast The Great Tennessee Monkey Trial in 2009, is a radio version starring Neil Patrick Harris and Ed Asner.

The 1997 The Simpsons episode "Lisa the Skeptic" drew inspiration from the trial, along with the Cardiff Giant and Piltdown Man hoaxes. The 2010 film Alleged, a romantic drama which is set around the Scopes trial, starring Brian Dennehy as Clarence Darrow and Fred Thompson as William Jennings Bryan, was released by Two Shoes Productions. While the main storyline is fictional, all the courtroom scenes are accurate according to the actual trial transcripts. Coincidentally, Dennehy had played Matthew Harrison Brady, the fictionalized counterpart of Bryan, in the 2007 Broadway revival of Inherit the Wind. In 2013, the Comedy Central series Drunk History retold portions of the trial in the "Nashville" episode, with Bradley Whitford portraying Bryan, Jack McBrayer as Darrow, and Derek Waters as Scopes.

=== Art ===
Gallery: Monkey Trial shows cartoons made in reaction to the trial.

=== Literature ===
Ronald Kidd's 2006 novel, Monkey Town: The Summer of the Scopes Trial, set in summer 1925, in Dayton, is based on the Scopes Trial.

It was not until the 1960s that the Scopes trial began to be mentioned in the history textbooks which were used in American high schools and colleges. Such textbooks usually portrayed it as an example of the conflict between fundamentalists and modernists, and it was frequently mentioned in the sections of those same textbooks which also described the rise of the second iteration of the Ku Klux Klan in the South, which occurred around the same time.

=== Music ===
A series of folk songs were written in reaction to the trial. The most prominent included the comedy song "Monkey Biz-Ness (Down in Tennessee)," performed by singer Billy Murray with the International Novelty Orchestra; and country singer Vernon Dalhart's "The John T. Scopes Trial (The Old Religion's Better After All)", which was written by Carson Robison. Other songs included "Bryan's Last Fight", "You Can't Make a Monkey of Me", "Monkey Business", "Ain't No Bugs On Me", and "You Talk Like a Monkey and You Walk Like a Monkey", which tended to echo a skepticism towards the theory of evolution and the scientific perspective on human origins. Bruce Springsteen performed a song called "Part Man, Part Monkey" during his 1988 Tunnel of Love Express Tour, and recorded a version of it in 1990 that was first released as a 1992 B-side and was later released on the 1998 multi-volume Tracks collection. The song references the Scopes trial ("They prosecuted some poor sucker in these United States / For teaching that man descended from the apes") but says that the trial could have been avoided by merely looking at how men behave around women ("They coulda settled that case without a fuss or fight / If they'd seen me chasing you, sugar, through the jungle last night / They'da called in that jury and a one two three, said / Part man, part monkey, definitely").

== Commemoration ==
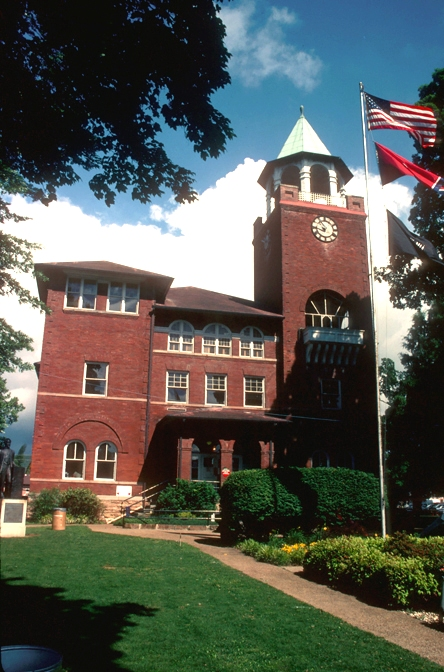
The Rhea County Courthouse, the site of the Scopes trial, is a National Historic Landmark.

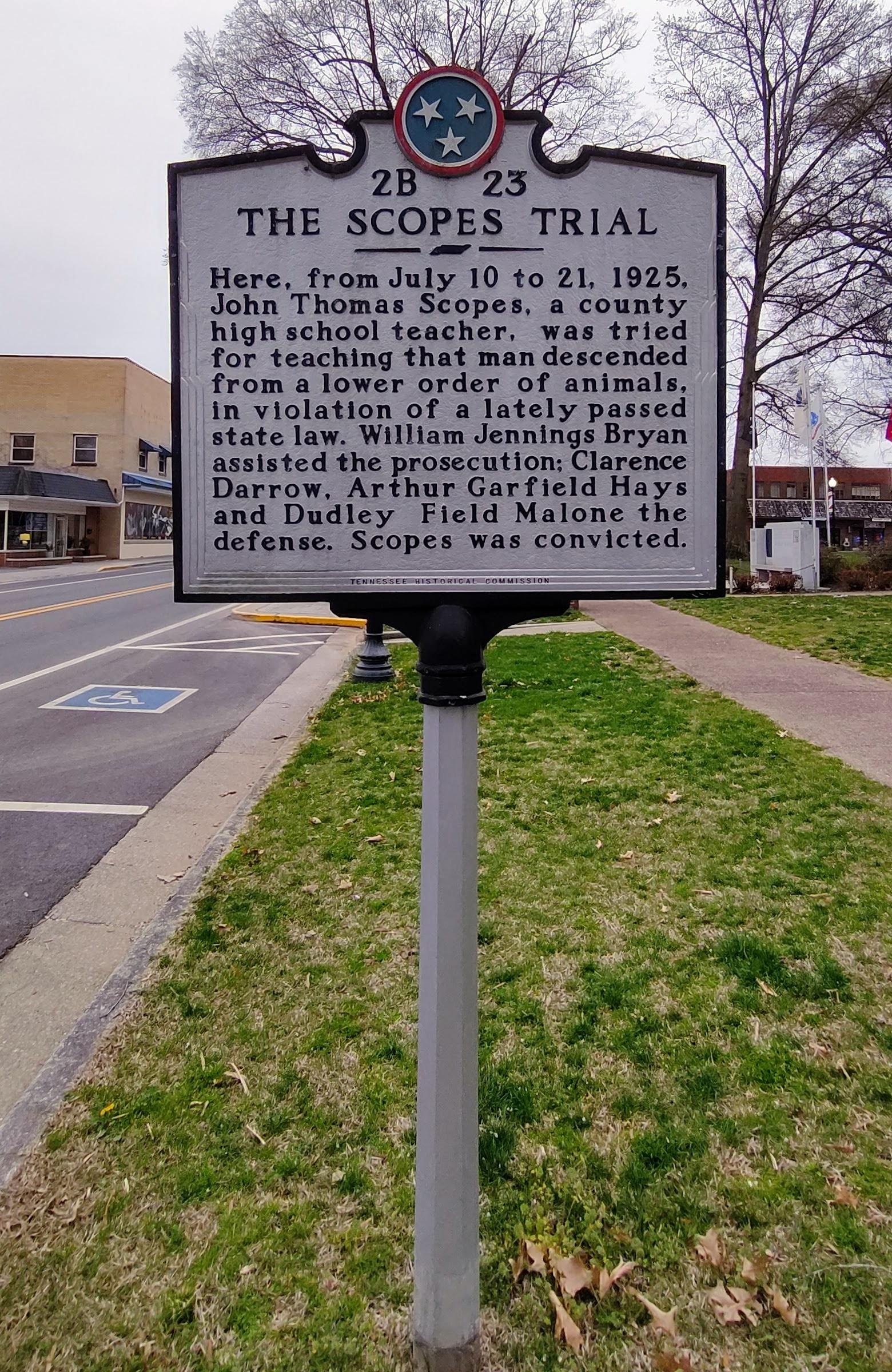
A historical marker in front of the Rhea County Courthouse commemorates the trial

Bryan College is a private Christian college in Dayton that was established in 1930 in honor of William Jennings Bryan. Bryan had long expressed a desire for the establishment of a fundamentalist Biblical higher educational institution, and during the trial suggested that such a school be established in Dayton.

The Rhea County Courthouse was listed on the National Register of Historic Places in 1972 and was designated a National Historic Landmark by the National Park Service in 1976 for its role in the trial. Between 1977 and 1979 a rehabilitation project was undertaken on the 1891-built courthouse, which had fallen into disrepair. This included restoring the second-floor courtroom to its appearance during the trial and the establishment of the Rhea County Heritage and Scopes Trial Museum, which opened on May 11, 1979. Located in the basement of the courthouse, this museum contains such memorabilia as the microphone used to broadcast the trial, trial records, photographs, and an audiovisual history.

Since 1988, locals have participated in a play called "Destiny in Dayton", a re-enactment of key moments of the trial that takes place in the courtroom during July. This evolved into the larger Scopes Trial Festival in 1989, which includes vendors, craftsmen, and live music. The Tennessee Historical Commission erected a historical marker in front of the courthouse which commemorates the site of the trial. In 2005, a statue of William Jennings Bryan was dedicated on the courthouse lawn, funded by a donation from nearby Bryan College. In 2017, a statue of Clarence Darrow was unveiled near Bryan's statue, funded by a donation from the Freedom From Religion Foundation.

== See also ==
- 1911 Brigham Young University modernism controversy
- Creation and evolution in public education
- Creationism
- Evolution
- Kitzmiller v. Dover Area School District
- Charles Lee Smith
- National Center for Science Education
- On the Origin of Species (1859) by Charles Darwin
- Mildred Seydell
- Edwards v. Aguillard
