= Butler Act =

1925 Tennessee state law prohibiting the teaching of evolution in schools

Tennessee General Assembly
- Long title: AN ACT prohibiting the teaching of the Evolution Theory in all the Universities, and all other public schools of Tennessee, which are supported in whole or in part by the public school funds of the State, and to provide penalties for the violations thereof
- Passed by: Tennessee House of Representatives
- Passed by: Tennessee Senate
- Signed by: Governor Austin Peay
- Signed: March 21, 1925
- Repealed: September 1, 1967

Legislative history

Initiating chamber: Tennessee House of Representatives
- Bill citation: House Bill No. 185
- Introduced by: John Washington Butler
- Introduced: January 21, 1925
- Committee responsible: House Committee on Education
- Passed: January 28, 1925
- Voting summary: 71 voted for; 5 voted against

Revising chamber: Tennessee Senate
- Committee responsible: Senate Judiciary Committee
- Passed: March 13, 1925
- Voting summary: 24 voted for; 6 voted against

Repealed by
- Chapter No. 237, House Bill No. 48
- Status: Repealed

The Butler Act was a 1925 Tennessee law prohibiting public school teachers from denying the Genesis account of humankind's origin. The law also prevented the teaching of the evolution of humans from what it referred to as lower orders of animals in place of the Biblical account. The law was introduced by Tennessee House of Representatives member John Washington Butler, for whom the law was named. It was enacted as Tennessee Code Annotated Title 49 (Education) Section 1922, having been signed into law by Tennessee governor Austin Peay.

The law was challenged and upheld later that year in a famous trial in Dayton, Tennessee called the Scopes Trial which involved a raucous confrontation between prosecution attorney and fundamentalist religious leader, William Jennings Bryan, and prominent defense attorney and religious agnostic, Clarence Darrow.

It was not repealed until 1967.

== Provisions of the law ==
The law, "An act prohibiting the teaching of the Evolution Theory in all the Universities, and all other public schools of Tennessee, which are supported in whole or in part by the public school funds of the State, and to provide penalties for the violations thereof" (Tenn. HB 185, 1925) specifically provided:

That it shall be unlawful for any teacher in any of the Universities, Normals and all other public schools of the State which are supported in whole or in part by the public school funds of the State, to teach any theory that denies the story of the Divine Creation of man as taught in the Bible, and to teach instead that man has descended from a lower order of animals.

It additionally outlined that an offending teacher would be guilty of a misdemeanor and fined between $100 and $500 for each offense.

By the terms of the statute, it could be argued, it was not illegal to teach evolution in respect to non-human organisms, such as stating that all animal species descended from protozoa-like ancestors or to teach the mechanisms of variation and natural selection. The bill also did not touch on, or restrict the teaching of prevailing scientific theories of geology or the age of the Earth. It did not even require that the Book of Genesis be taught, but prohibited solely the teaching of any content denying that humanity was created by God as recorded in Genesis. However the author of the law, a Tennessee farmer and member of the Tennessee House of Representatives John Washington Butler, specifically intended that it would prohibit the teaching of evolution. He later was reported to have said "No, I didn't know anything about evolution when I introduced it. I'd read in the papers that boys and girls were coming home from school and telling their fathers and mothers that the Bible was all nonsense."

After he finished reading copies of William Jennings Bryan's "Is the Bible True?" as well as Charles Darwin's The Origin of Species and The Descent of Man, Butler decided to write his law.

== Challenges ==
The law was challenged by the ACLU in the famed Scopes Trial, in which John Scopes, a high school science teacher who agreed to be paid on a charge of having taught evolution, was nominally served a warrant on May 5, 1925. Scopes was indicted on May 25 and ultimately convicted; on appeal the Tennessee Supreme Court found the law to be constitutional under the Tennessee State Constitution, because:

We are not able to see how the prohibition of teaching the theory that man has descended from a lower order of animals gives preference to any religious establishment or mode of worship. So far as we know, there is no religious establishment or organized body that has in its creed or confession of faith any article denying or affirming such a theory. — Scopes v. State 289 S.W. 363, 367 (Tenn. 1927)

Despite this decision, the Tennessee Supreme Court reversed the conviction on a technicality (that the jury should have fixed the amount of the fine), and the case was not retried. During the trial, Butler told reporters: "I never had any idea my bill would make a fuss. I just thought it would become a law, and that everybody would abide by it and that we wouldn't hear any more of evolution in Tennessee."

The law remained on the books until 1967, when teacher Gary L. Scott of Jacksboro, Tennessee, who had been dismissed for violation of the act, sued for reinstatement, citing his First Amendment right to free speech. Although his termination was rescinded, Scott continued his fight with a class action lawsuit in the Nashville Federal District Court, seeking a permanent injunction against enforcement of that law. Within three days of his filing suit, a bill for repeal of the Butler Act had passed both houses of the Tennessee legislature and was signed into law May 18 by Governor Buford Ellington.

== See also ==
- Monkey Town
- Creation and evolution in public education
- Inherit the Wind
