= The Night Parade =

Book by Kathryn Tanquary

- Author: Kathryn Tanquary
- Genre: Fantasy; Science fiction Middle-grade fiction
- Published: March 2016
- Publisher: Sourcebooks Jabberwocky
- ISBN: 978-1-4926-2324-3

The Night Parade (2016) is a juvenile fiction debut novel by Kathryn Tanquary, a middle-grade author and teacher of English as a foreign language in Gunma Prefecture, Japan.

Tanquary’s The Night Parade is reminiscent of the 2001 Japanese anime fantasy film Spirited Away by Hayao Miyazaki. It has also been likened to Neil Gaiman’s Coraline and Grimm's fairy tales.

== Plot ==
Saki Yamamato, a 13-year-old girl, travels with her parents from their home in Tokyo to visit her widowed grandmother in the Japanese countryside for the annual Obon festival. Used to the convenience of always being connected to her friends by cell phone, Saki is horrified when she loses signal in the rural mountain village where her grandmother lives. In an attempt to fit in with a group of local kids, Saki goes to the mountain’s graveyard shrine to ring the sacred bell, and she is plagued with a death curse that she must break in order to save her family and the human world. A series of spirits—a sly kitsune, a legendary tengu, and a talkative tanuki—from the mountain visit her over the next three nights to aid her in her quest to reverse the deadly curse. She must walk in the Night Parade of spirits (aka Hyakki Yagyō or the Night Parade of One Hundred Demons) to find someone who can help her undo the curse. Along the way, she learns the importance of family and her heritage and gains a stronger appreciation for her grandmother and her Japanese roots.

== Reception ==
The Night Parade was included in the winter 2015/2016 IndieBound Kids’ Indie Next List for ages 9 to 12.

Tanquary's debut novel has received mixed reviews from critics. It has been praised for its attempt to mesh Japanese culture with the struggles of modern teenagers, like peer pressure, protective parents, and technology consumption. In a starred review for Publishers Weekly, literary agent Thao Le wrote, "Vivid details and realistic situations ensure accessibility, and subtle teaching moments are wrapped in wide-eyed enchantment."

Saki's character faced criticism due to her lack of introspection and her overall negative attitude throughout the book, however. The author has also been criticized for failing to further explore the story's fantastical side, despite "creating a world where both Japanese beliefs and cosmic mythology are real and co-exist."

"Tanquary provides a cursory introduction to Shinto tradition and culture but fails to fully commit to the Japanese spirit world," according to a Kirkus Review. "This inconsistency, together with a tendency to tell rather than show, distracts readers from the supernatural elements of Saki’s adventures and keeps them from immersing themselves in her world."

== See also ==
- Kathryn Tanquary
- Sourcebooks Jabberwocky
- Spirited Away
- Shinto religion
- Hyakki Yagyō
