= Monkey Town (novel) =

2006 novel about the 1925 Scopes Trial

Monkey Town: The Summer of the Scopes Trial
- First edition (publ. Simon & Schuster)
- Author: Ronald Kidd
- Language: English
- Publication date: 2006

Monkey Town: The Summer of the Scopes Trial is a 2006 novel written by American author Ronald Kidd. The story is set in summer 1925 in Dayton, Tennessee, and is based on the Scopes Trial.

== Plot summary ==
Frances Robinson, a fifteen-year-old daydreamer, lives in Dayton, a small town in Tennessee. When the summer starts, she wants only to play tennis and drink Coke. However, things bounce out of normal range when her father, the school board chairman, arrests local teacher (and Frances' friend and love interest) John Scopes for teaching Charles Darwin's evolution theory in class, in an effort to attract publicity to the town. Scopes is put on trial. Frances takes Scopes' side and defies her father, even though the case is not completely genuine.

Notable people such as politician William Jennings Bryan (prosecutor of Scopes), lawyer Clarence Darrow (defender of Scopes), and journalist H. L. Mencken arrive in Dayton, along with a horde of reporters, and drama stirs.

== Main characters ==
- Frances Robinson: fifteen-year-old daydreamer whose father arrests John Scopes for teaching evolution. She sides with Scopes, who is her secret crush.
- John Scopes: schoolteacher arrested for teaching evolution in a trial that attracted attention to Dayton, Tennessee.
- Mr. Robinson: Frances' father, who starts the Scopes Trial because he wants to attract publicity to Dayton.
- William Jennings Bryan: prosecutor of John Scopes and prominent American politician.
- Clarence Darrow: defense attorney for John Scopes, a prominent American lawyer.
- H. L. Mencken: journalist, essayist, and critic, Mencken arrived in Dayton when the trial took place to record the events.

== Reception ==
The Bulletin of the Center for Children's Books reviewed Monkey Town, stating that "Though the book rewrites a few bits of history to make its point, it's not the wholesale revisioning of Inherit the Wind, and the story is filled with authentic and lesser-known details." In their review the San Francisco Chronicle wrote "Kidd does his best to blend the historical bits into the coming-of-age narrative, and the result is a very smooth read, with no breaks into discussions of Darwin's life story or extraneous details about the time period."

The book also received reviews from the Horn Book Guide, Kliatt, ALAN Review, Christian Science Monitor, Chicago Sun-Times, and the School Library Journal.
