= U.S. Route 27 in Tennessee =

United States Numbered Highway in Tennessee

U.S. Route 27
- US 27 highlighted in red

Route information
- Maintained by TDOT
- Length: 144.8 mi (233.0 km)
- Existed: 1926–present
- Tourist routes: Cumberland Historic Byway

Major junctions
- South end: US 27 at the Georgia state line in Rossville, GA
- I-24 / US 11 / US 41 / US 64 / US 72 in Chattanooga; US 127 in Red Bank; SR 30 in Dayton; US 70 in Rockwood; I-40 in Harriman
- North end: US 27 at the Kentucky state line near Winfield

Location
- Country: United States
- State: Tennessee
- Counties: Hamilton, Rhea, Roane, Morgan, Scott

Highway system
- United States Numbered Highway System; List; Special; Divided; Tennessee State Routes; Interstate; US; State
← I-26	US 27	→ SR 27
← SR 28	SR 29	→ SR 30

U.S. Route 27 (US 27) in Tennessee runs from the Georgia state line in Chattanooga to the Kentucky state line in Isham. It forms the informal border between the Eastern and Central time zones of the state while staying in the Eastern Time Zone.

== Route description ==
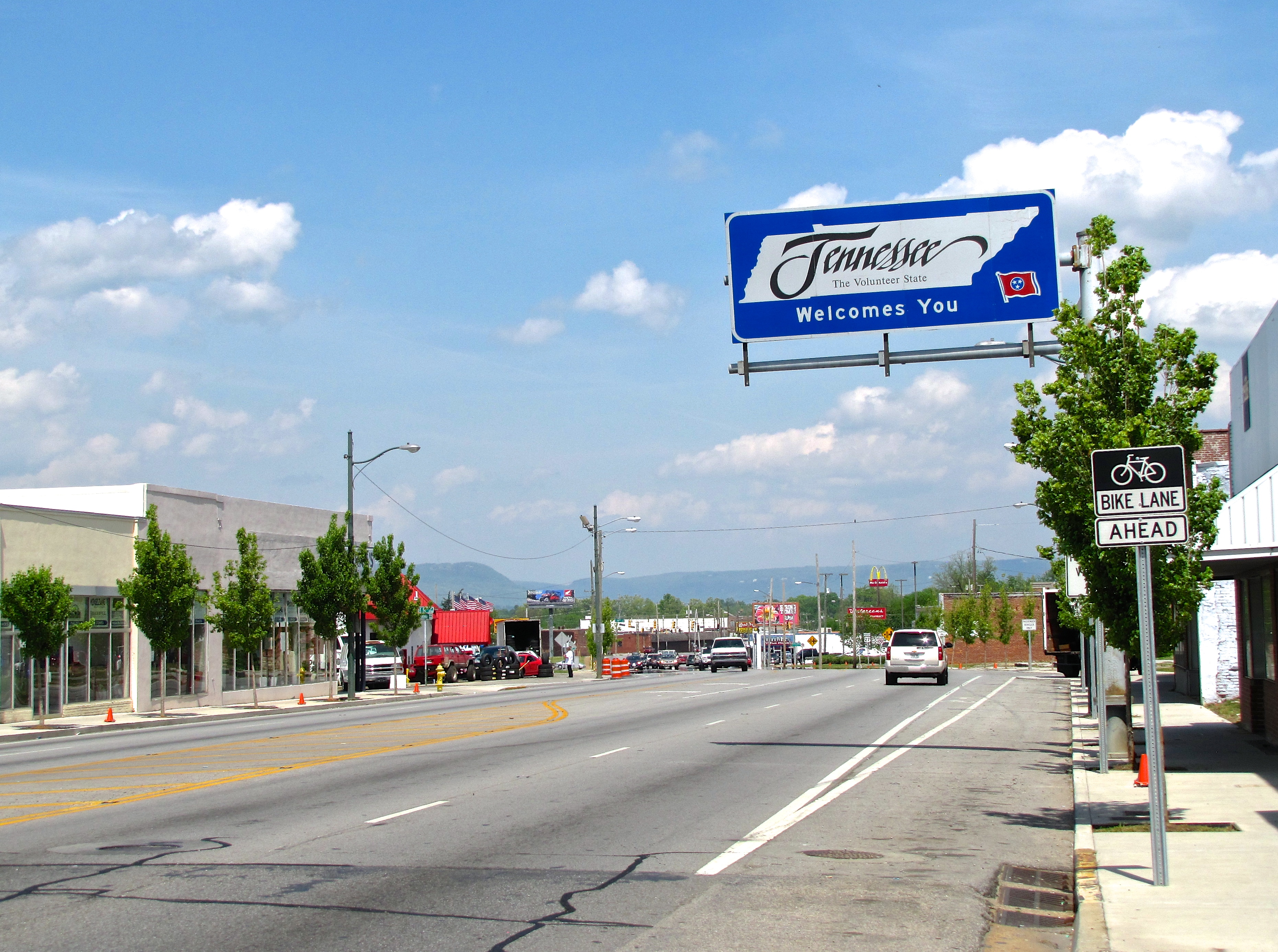
The Tennessee–Georgia state line dividing Rossville, Georgia, and Chattanooga along US 27

US 27 enters Tennessee from Rossville, Georgia, in Hamilton County as a four-lane highway, concurrent with both State Route 27 (SR 27) and SR 29. The route goes north as Rossville Boulevard, going through suburbs and passing by several businesses before entering Chattanooga and coming to an interchange with Interstate 24 (I-24; exits 180A–B) and briefly running concurrently with the Interstate, having interchanges with SR 58 (Market Street) and US 11/US 41/US 64/US 72/SR 2, before splitting off as a freeway (exit 178).

=== Freeway segment ===
Beginning at I-24 and ending at SR 111, the route is a controlled-access highway for approximately 24 miles (39 km). The highway goes north as a narrow four-lane freeway (concurrent with unsigned I-124) through downtown and has interchanges with West Main Street (exit 1), Martin Luther King Boulevard (exits 1A–B; unsigned SR 316), and Fourth Street (exit 1C; unsigned SR 389) before crossing the Tennessee River on the Olgiati Bridge, where it widens to eight lanes and unsigned I-124 ends. It then has interchanges with Manufacturer's Road and Dayton Boulevard (Old US 27; unsigned SR 8) before crossing Stringer's Ridge to have an interchange with the national southern terminus of US 27's only auxiliary route, US 127, which is where SR 27 splits off to go north on that route. From here, the route is part of Corridor J of the Appalachian Development Highway System. US 27/SR 29 then narrow to six lanes and runs on top of a ridge while passing through Red Bank, where it has interchanges with Morrison Springs Road (where it narrows to four lanes), Mountain Creek Road, SR 153 southbound, and Dayton Pike northbound (once again, the old route of US 27), before entering Soddy-Daisy. The route continues north with interchanges at Thrasher Pike and Harrison Lane before having an interchange at Sequoyah Access Road, the main route to the Sequoyah Nuclear Plant. It then has an interchange with SR 319 (Hixson Pike) before running along the Tennessee River to a massive interchange with SR 111, which splits off to the northwest for Dunlap, where the freeway ends. The freeway continues along SR 111.

=== Hamilton County to Kentucky line ===
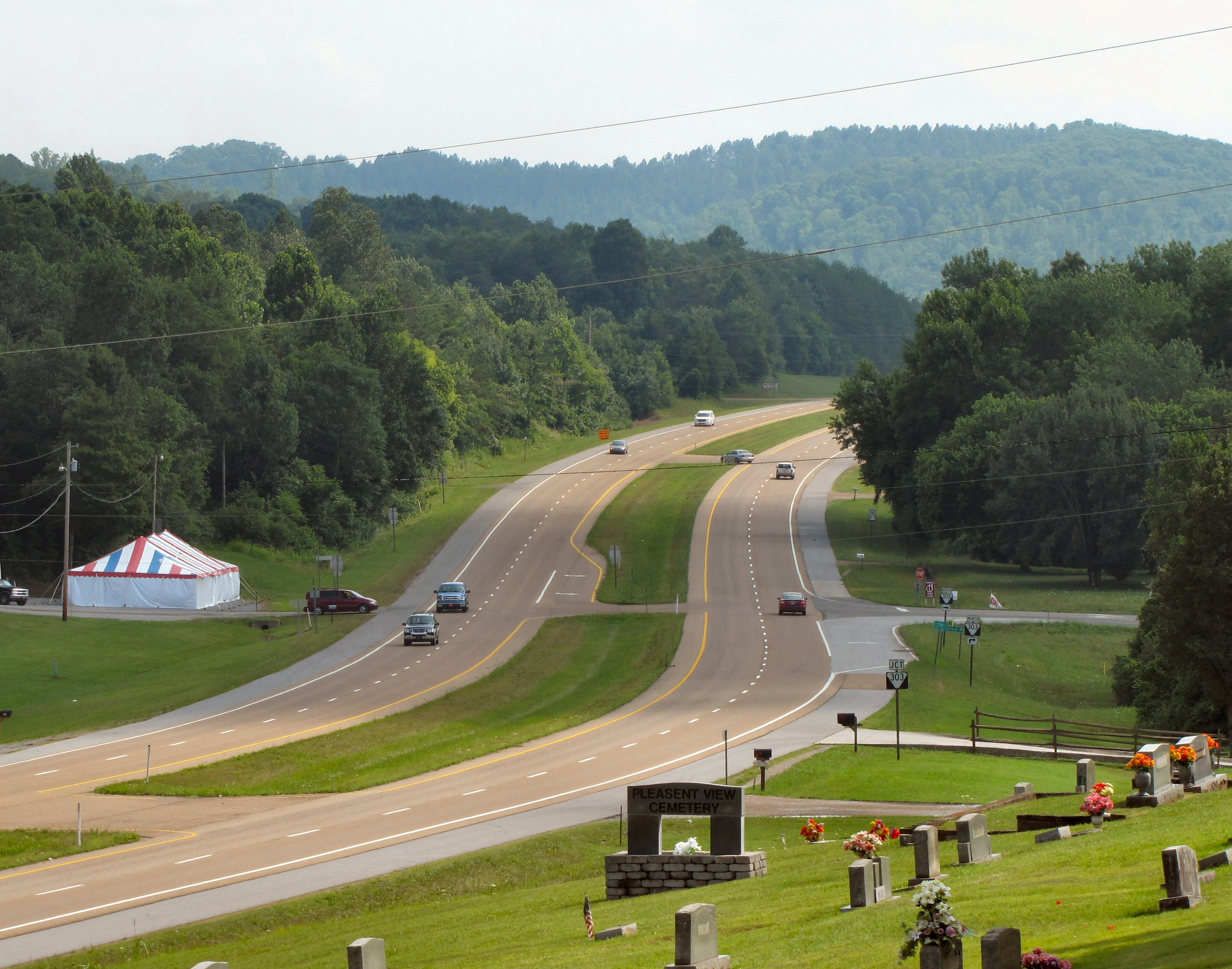
US 27 at its intersection with SR 303, in Rhea County near Graysville

US 27 continues as a four-lane divided highway through the small towns of Sale Creek and Graysville, where it intersects with SR 303, before crossing into Rhea County and reaching Graysville. The route then enters Dayton at the intersection with SR 378 (Market Street; Old US 27) and SR 60 (Hiwassee Highway). It bypasses downtown to the east and intersects SR 30. US 27 then has another intersection with SR 378 before it leaves Dayton and continues northward through Evensville before becoming concurrent with SR 68 and arriving at Spring City. It then has an interchange where SR 68 splits off to the west, while US 27 enters downtown and intersects with SR 302. It then leaves Spring City and continues north through farmland.

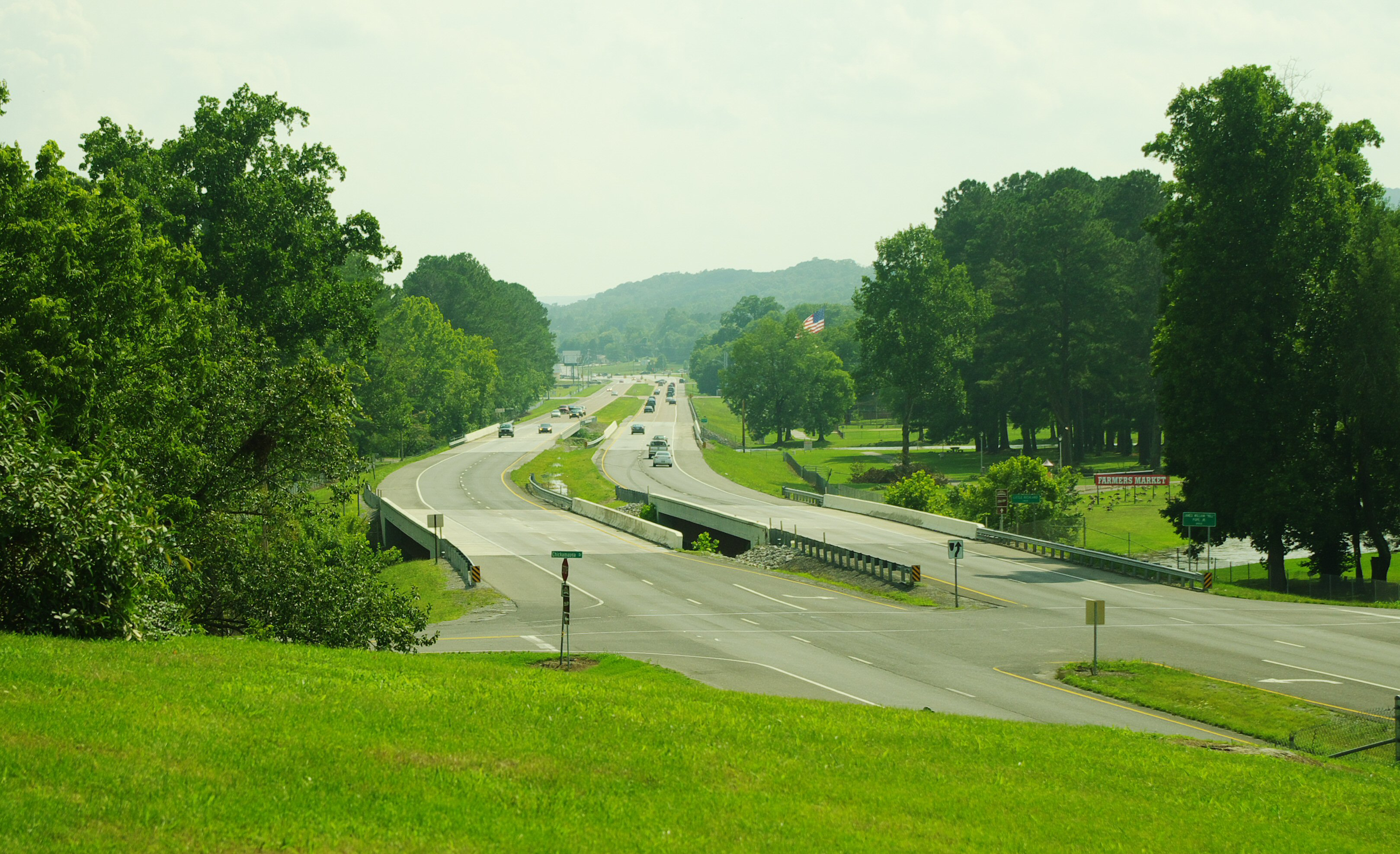
US 27 at its Richland Creek crossings in Dayton

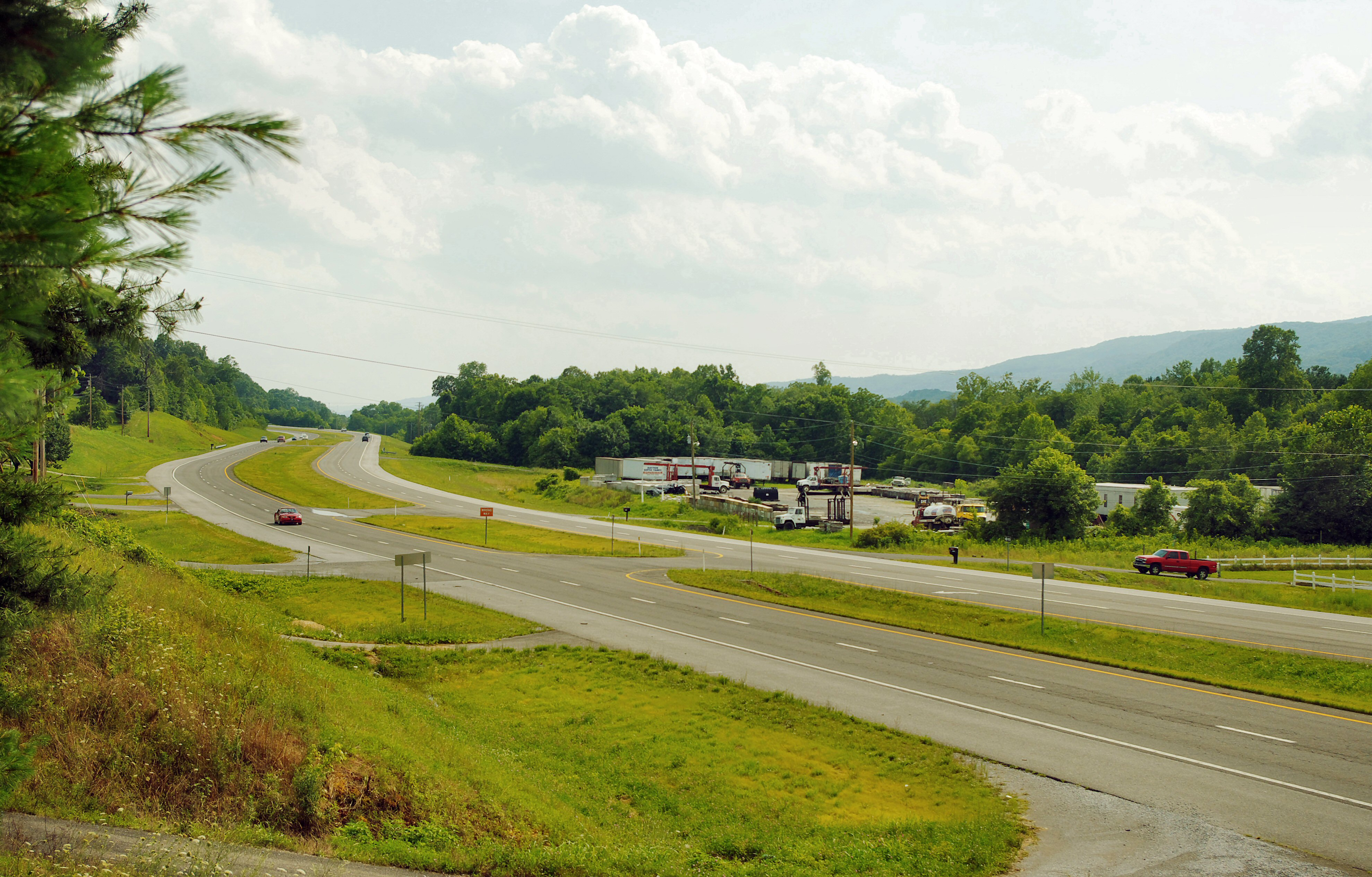
US 27 in Evensville with the Cumberland Plateau on the right

From here, US 27 enters Roane County and runs through Glen Alice before becoming concurrent with US 70/SR 1 and entering the city of Rockwood. They go straight through town, passing just east of downtown before US 70 splits to the east, taking SR 1 and SR 29 with it. US 27 then runs concurrently with SR 61 (which is signecept on I-40), as that highway begins here. US 27/SR 61 then pass through Cardiff, where they intersect with the short SR 382, which provides access to Roane State Community College. They then enter Harriman and pass through countryside before coming to an interchange with I-40 (exit 347). During this stretch, it forms part of the Harvey H. Hannah Memorial Highway and is signed as such. They then enter the South Harriman neighborhood and pass by several businesses and rejoin with SR 29 (Ruritain Road). They then cross the bridge over the Emory River to enter and pass through the historic downtown, intersecting with SR 328. Just beyond Harriman, near the DeArmond community, US 27/SR 29 then splits from SR 61 at an interchange, with the Harvey H. Hannah Memorial Highway following that route to the east. US 27/SR 29 then begin to ascend the Cumberland Plateau as it narrows to two lanes and continues northward across the plateau for its remaining 55 miles (89 km) or so in Tennessee.

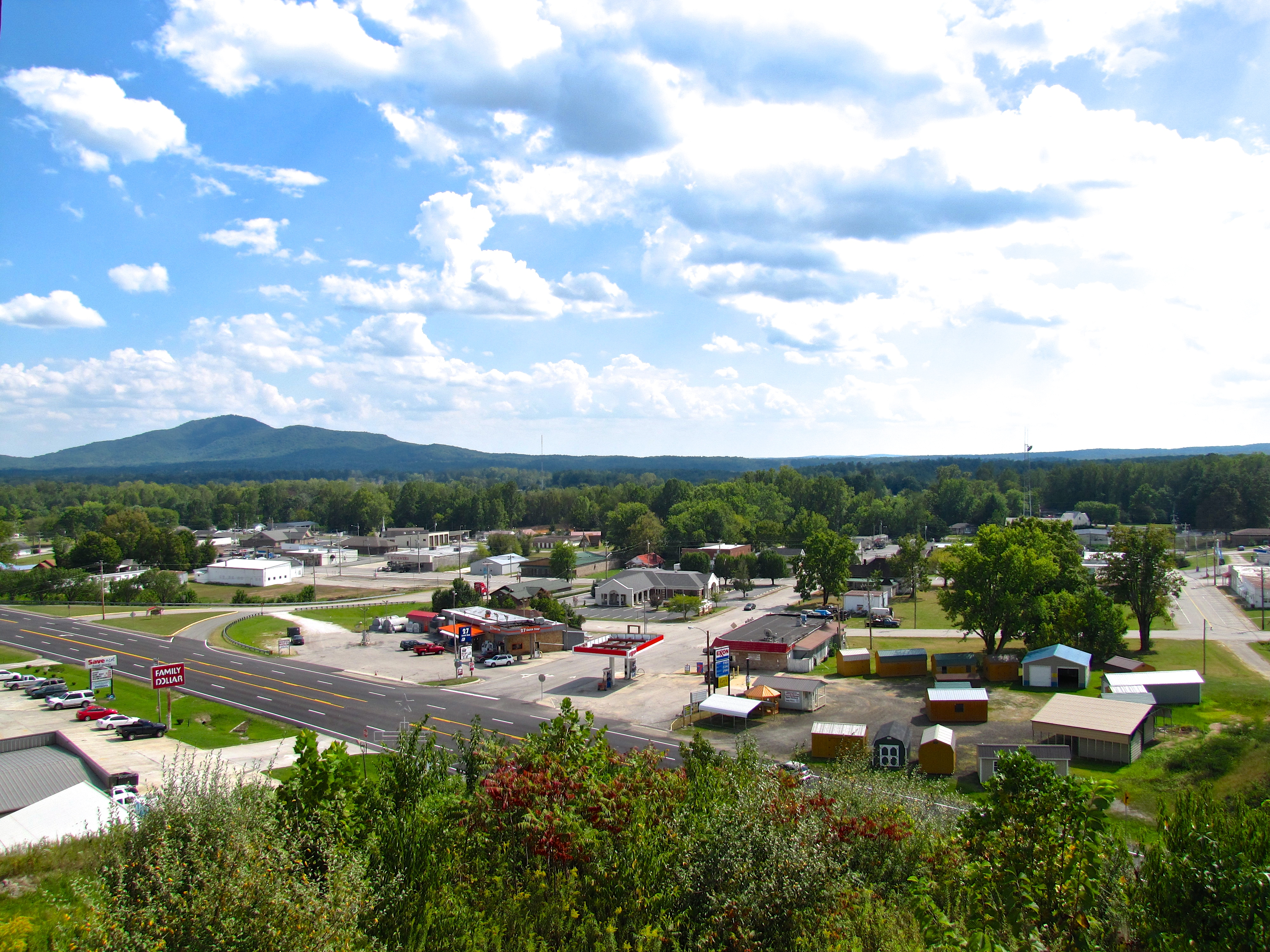
View of Wartburg with Lone Mountain in the background on the left and US 27 below

In Morgan County, the highway passes through the rugged mountains of the Cumberland Plateau and has another intersection with SR 328 before ascending a ridge to enter Mossy Grove. It passes through Mossy Grove and has an intersection with Clayton Howard Road, which provides access to Lone Mountain State Forest. It then leaves the town and continues north to an intersection with Main Street (Old US 27 in downtown) just before entering Wartburg. US 27/SR 29 then widen to four lanes just before the intersection with SR 62 and becomes concurrent with that route. They go north, bypassing downtown to the east before leaving Wartburg at the intersection with Old Gobey Road, which heads off to Gobey. The highway then descends a mountain and narrows to two lanes once again just before another crossing of the Emory River. They then have an intersection with Gobey Road, another access road to Gobey, before SR 62 splits off to the west. US 27/SR 29 then becomes narrow, curvy, and winding as it passes through rural areas. The highway passes by the Morgan County fairgrounds before passing through the town of Annadel. It does not have any passing lanes before entering the town of Sunbright. US 27/SR 29 passes through the center of town, having Intersections with SR 329 and Burrville Road, an access road to Burrville. It then becomes even curvier as it leaves Morgan County to cross into Scott County. For the next 12 miles (19 km) it is one place to pass with a 40 mph (64 km/h) speed limit. US 27/SR 29 then passes through the community of Glenmary before entering Elgin, where the highway intersects SR 52, which connects the area with the historic village of Rugby and Fentress County to the west.

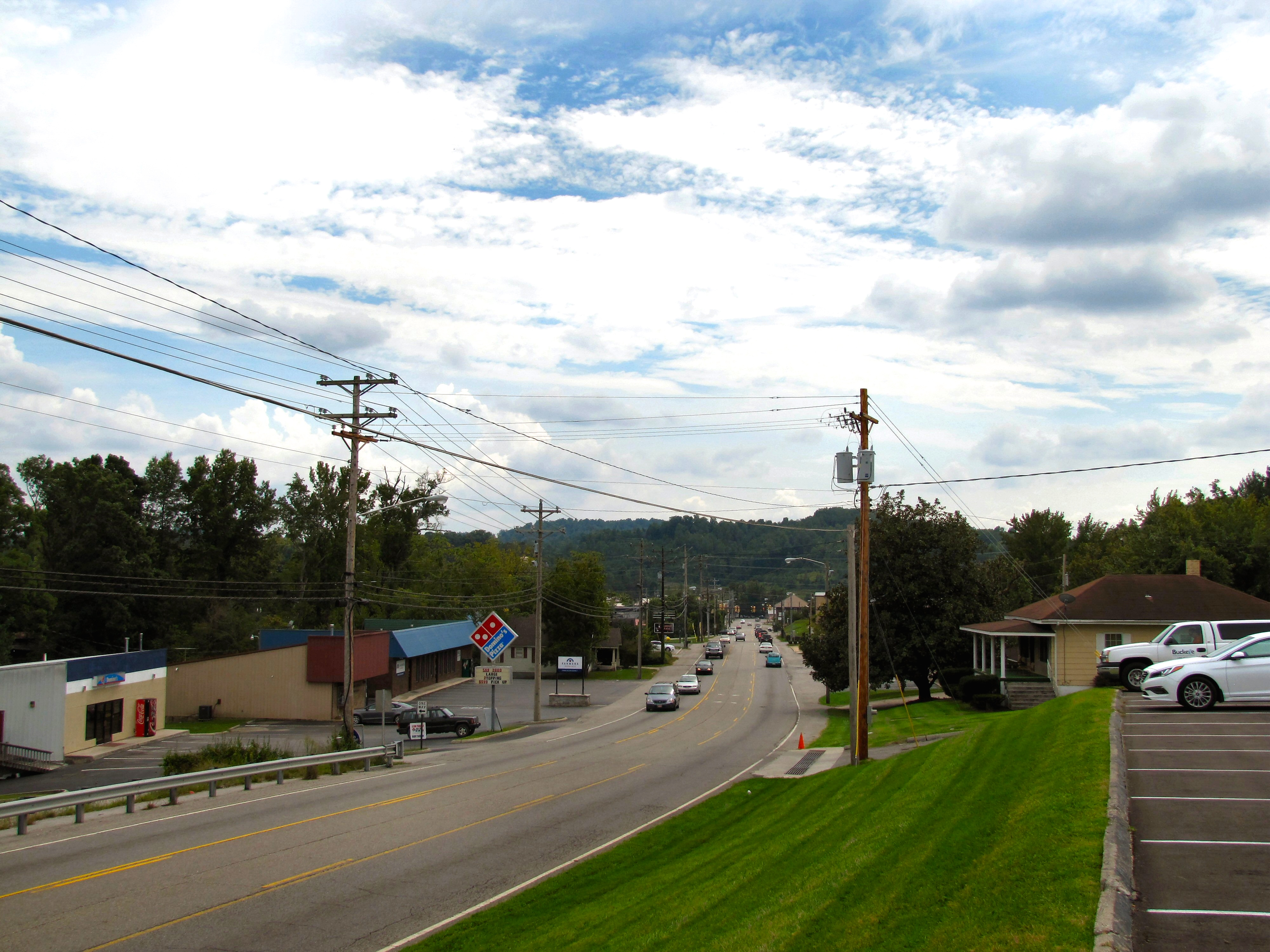
US 27 (Alberta Street) in Oneida

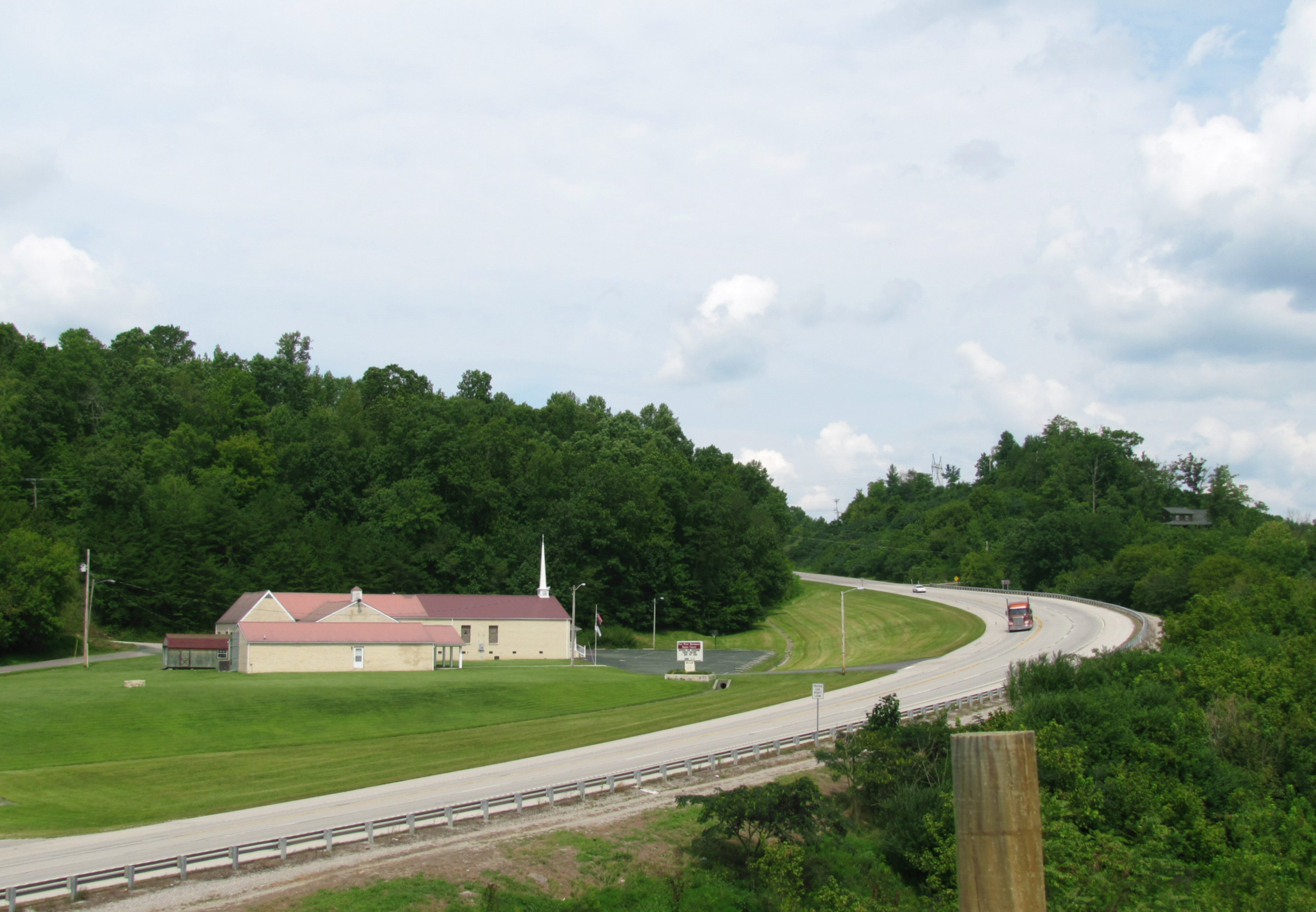
US 27 south of Huntsville in Scott County

Beyond Elgin, US 27/SR 29 passes through Robbins, the county seat of Huntsville (where it intersects with SR 63, becomes concurrent with SR 297, and widens to four lanes), and Helenwood before reaching the city of Oneida.

In Oneida, the highway passes through a major business district before narrowing to two lanes again before entering downtown and having an intersection with SR 456 just before passing by Big South Fork Medical Center. SR 297 then splits off to the west in the center of town, which provides access to the Big South Fork National River and Recreation Area. US 27/SR 29 then passes through the rest of downtown before leaving Oneida and passes through Winfield, the last sizable town that US 27 passes through in Tennessee before it reaches the community of Isham on the Kentucky border, where SR 29 ends and US 27 continues north into McCreary County.

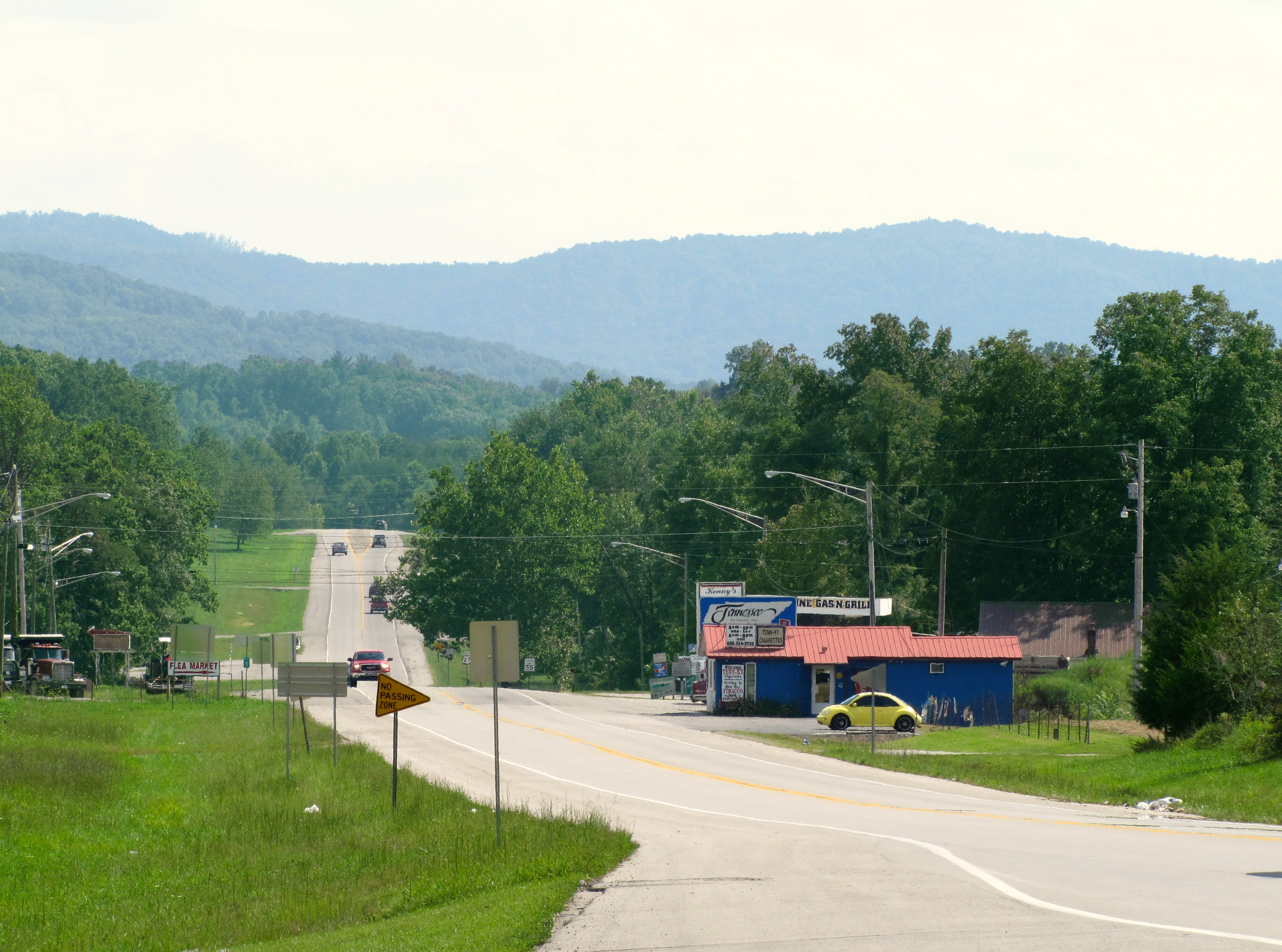
US 27 at the Tennessee–Kentucky state line, looking south into Scott County from McCreary County, Kentucky. The shop on the right sits near the border and allows Tennessee residents to take advantage of Kentucky's lower state sales tax on cigarettes.

== History ==
The route in Hamilton County was removed from its original location to build the controlled-access highway. The original route ran across the Market Street Bridge and became what is now called Dayton Boulevard, which then ran through Red Bank, east of the current route, and Soddy-Daisy, west of the current route. The majority of this route stmains and is sometimes referred to as "Old US 27" or "Old 27".

The first part of the controlled-access segment, located between Martin Luther King Jr. Boulevard and what is now the interchange with Dayton Pike was built between 1955 and 1959 by moving dirt from nearby Cameron Hill. This segment was extended south to I-24 and north to the terminus of US 127, both between 1960 and 1963, when the corresponding section of I-24 was built. Part of this route was once signed as I-124. The designation still exists, but the signage was removed in the late 1980s when the interchange with I-24 was rebuilt.

In late 1960, the 3.2-mile (5.1 km) four-lane bypass around Dayton was completed. The controlled-access portion between SR 153 and SR 319 (Hixson Pike) was built between 1975 and 1977. Construction on the controlled-access segment between US 127 and SR 153 was scheduled to begin in 1980 but was delayed multiple times. It was finally constructed between 1985 and 1989. SR 111 was extended over Walden Ridge to Dunlap in the early 1990s, and the controlled access segment of US 27 was extended approximately 1.75 miles (2.82 km) north to the terminus at this time.

The entire route has been widened to a four-lane highway all the way to the second junction with SR 328 near Oakdale.

Beginning in February 1999, the Olgiati Bridge was widened from four to six lanes. This was accomplished by attaching steel beams to the top of the posts over the river. Also in this project, a ramp was added from the bridge on the north side to Manufacturer's Road, replacing a cloverleaf loop ramp which diverged past the ramp. The project, after many delays, was completed in February 2003.

Beginning in the middle of 2012, the Tennessee Department of Transportation (TDOT) began rebuilding US 27 from the Olgiati Bridge to the interchange with US 127. The project involved the replacement of old bridges, widening from two lanes each way to three to four lanes each way, and construction of several retaining walls. Preparations for this project had begun in December 2011. The project was completed in early 2015, months ahead of schedule.

In December 2015, TDOT began a $126 million (equivalent to $162 million in 2024) reconstruction project to rebuild US 27 from I-24 to the recently reconstructed part. The project will widen the route from the existing two to three lanes each direction to three or four lanes each direction (including two more across the Olgiati), straighten out curvy sections, rework the Fourth Street and Martin Luther King interchanges, and add retaining walls. The project was expected to be complete by July 31, 2019, but, due to multiple delays, was not substantially completed until early 2021. The substructure of the Olgiati Bridge was built wider than the superstructure in anticipation of future widening in the first widening project.

== Major intersections ==
County	Location	mi	km	Exit	Destinations	Notes
Hamilton	Chattanooga	0.0	0.0		US 27 south (SR 1 south) – Rossville	Georgia state line; southern end of SR 27/SR 29 overlap
Hamilton	Chattanooga	2.3– 2.7	3.7– 4.3		I-24 east – Knoxville, Atlanta	Southern end of I-24 overlap; US 27 south follows exit 180B
Hamilton	Chattanooga			180A	Rossville Boulevard / Central Avenue	No northbound entrance; signed as SR 8 north, but actually serves 23rd Street (US 11 / US 64 / SR 2)
Hamilton	Chattanooga				SR 58 (Market Street)	Northbound exits and southbound entrances; loop ramps include connecting ramps to and from Long Street
Hamilton	Chattanooga				US 11 / US 41 / US 64 (Broad Street / US 72 / SR 2 / SR 17) – Lookout Mountain	Southbound exit and northbound entrance; ramps include connecting ramps to and from Williams Street
Hamilton	Chattanooga	3.7– 4.6	6.0– 7.4		I-24 west to I-59 / I-124 begins – Nashville, Birmingham	Northern end of I-24 overlap; southern end of I-124 overlap; US 27 north follows exit 178
Hamilton	Chattanooga	4.8– 5.0	7.7– 8.0	1	Main Street	Northbound exit and southbound entrance
Hamilton	Chattanooga	5.2– 5.7	8.4– 9.2	1A-B	M.L. King Boulevard (SR 316 east) - Downtown	Signed as exit 1A northbound and exits 1A (east) and 1B (west) southbound
Hamilton	Chattanooga	5.7– 6.1	9.2– 9.8	1C	I-124 ends / SR 389 west (4th Street) to SR 58 – Downtown	Northern end of I-124 overlap; southern end of SR 29 overlap; connector to SR 58; signed as SR 58
Hamilton	Chattanooga	6.2– 6.4	10.0– 10.3	P.R. Olgiati Bridge across the Tennessee River		
Hamilton	Chattanooga	6.4– 6.8	10.3– 10.9	—	Manufacturers Road / Cherokee Boulevard (SR 8)	
Hamilton	Red Bank	7.4– 7.7	11.9– 12.4	—	Dayton Boulevard (SR 8 north) - Red Bank	Northbound exit and southbound entrance
Hamilton	Red Bank	8.0– 8.5	12.9– 13.7	—	US 127 north (SR 8 / SR 27) – Signal Mountain	national southern terminus of US 127; northern end of SR 27 concurrency
Hamilton	Red Bank	10.9– 11.8	17.5– 19.0	—	Morrison Springs Road – Erlanger North Hospital	
Hamilton	Chattanooga	13.5– 14.2	21.7– 22.9	—	Mountain Creek Road	
Hamilton	Soddy-Daisy	16.9– 17.4	27.2– 28.0	—	SR 153 (Dayton Boulevard) – Chattanooga	Northern terminus of SR 153; access to Chattanooga Metropolitan Airport
Hamilton	Soddy-Daisy	19.2– 19.5	30.9– 31.4	—	Thrasher Pike	
Hamilton	Soddy-Daisy	21.2– 21.7	34.1– 34.9	—	Harrison Lane	
Hamilton	Soddy-Daisy	22.9– 23.2	36.9– 37.3	—	Sequoyah Road	
Hamilton	Soddy-Daisy	25.0– 25.6	40.2– 41.2	—	SR 319 south (Tsati Terrace)	Northern terminus of SR 319
Hamilton	Soddy-Daisy	26.8– 27.2	43.1– 43.8		SR 111 north – Dunlap	Northern end of freeway; southern terminus of SR 111
Rhea	Graysville	37.5	60.4		SR 303 north (Dayton Avenue) – Downtown	Southern terminus of SR 303
Rhea	Dayton	41.7	67.1		SR 60 south (Hiwassee Highway) / SR 378 north (Market Street) – Cleveland, Downtown	Northern terminus of SR 60; southern terminus of SR 378
Rhea	Dayton	43.0	69.2		SR 30 (3rd Avenue/Old Washington Highway) – Pikeville, Downtown, Decatur	
Rhea	Dayton	43.6– 43.7	70.2– 70.3		SR 378 south (Market Street) – Downtown	Interchange; no direct southbound entrance from SR 378 north; northern terminus of SR 378
Rhea		56.6	91.1		SR 68 south (Watts Bar Highway) – Sweetwater	Southern end of SR 68 overlap
Rhea	Spring City	59.1	95.1		SR 68 north (Wassom Memorial Highway) – Crossville	Northern end of SR 68 overlap; interchange
Rhea	Spring City	59.4	95.6		SR 302 south (New Lake Road)	Northern terminus of SR 302
Roane		73.3	118.0		US 70 west (SR 1) – Westel, Ozone, Crab Orchard, Crossville	Southern end of US 70/SR 1 overlap
Roane	Rockwood	76.1	122.5		US 70 east (Roane State Highway/SR 1/SR 29) / SR 61 east – Kingston	Northern end of US 70/SR 1/SR 29 overlap; western terminus of SR 61; southern end of SR 61 overlap
Roane	Cardiff	79.5	127.9		SR 382 south (Patton Lane)	Northern terminus of SR 382; provides access to Roane State Community College
Roane	Harriman	81.5– 81.8	131.2– 131.6		I-40 – Nashville, Knoxville	I-40 exit 347
Roane	Harriman	83.1	133.7		SR 29 south (Ruritain Road) – Midtown	Southern end of SR 29 overlap
Roane	Harriman	84.8	136.5		SR 328 north (Georgia Street) – Oakdale	Southern terminus of SR 328
Roane		88.3– 88.6	142.1– 142.6		SR 61 east (Harriman Highway) – Oliver Springs	Interchange; northern end of SR 61 overlap
Morgan		93.3	150.2		SR 328 south (Old Harriman Highway) – Oakdale	Northern terminus of SR 328
Morgan	Wartburg	101.0	162.5		SR 62 east (Knoxville Highway) – Coalfield, Oliver Springs	Southern end of SR 62 overlap
Morgan		104.3	167.9		SR 62 west (Nashville Highway) – Lancing	Northern end of SR 62 overlap
Morgan	Sunbright	112.9	181.7		SR 329 west (Deer Lodge Highway) – Deer Lodge	Eastern terminus of SR 329
Scott	Elgin	121.8	196.0		SR 52 west (Rugby Highway) – Rugby	Eastern terminus of SR 52
Scott	Huntsville	129.7	208.7		SR 63 east / SR 297 east (Howard Baker Highway) to I-75 – Pioneer, Caryville	Southern end of SR 297 overlap; western terminus of SR 63
Scott	Oneida	136.3	219.4		SR 297 west (Industrial Lane)	Northern end of SR 297 overlap; provides access to Big South Fork National River and Recreation Area
Scott	Oneida	136.4	219.5		SR 456 east (Depot Street)	Western terminus of SR 456
Kentucky state line		145.2	233.7		US 27 north – Whitley City	Continuation into Kentucky; northern end of SR 29 overlap
1.000 mi = 1.609 km; 1.000 km = 0.621 mi: Concurrency terminus; Incomplete access

== State Route 29 ==
State Route 29
- Location: Chattanooga–Oneida
- Length: 141.95 mi (228.45 km)
- Existed: October 1, 1923–present

State Route 29 (SR 29) runs as a hidden designation throughout US 27's routing from the Georgia state line in Chattanooga to the Kentucky state line north of Oneida, though it does separate in Rockwood at an intersection with US 70/SR 1, becoming concurrent with it until Midtown. There, it becomes signed as a standalone secondary highway (Pine Ridge Road) and has an interchange with I-40 before entering the South Harriman neighborhood of Harriman (as Ruritan Road), then becoming hidden again at an intersection with US 27/SR 61 south of downtown. Excluding this signed portion, the rest of SR 29 is a primary highway. In downtown Oneida, SR 29 has received a signed designation.

=== Major intersections ===
The entire route is in Roane County.

Location	mi	km	Destinations	Notes
Rockwood			US 27 north / US 70 / SR 61 east (Gateway Boulevard/SR 1) – Downtown, Harriman	Northern end US 27 concurrency; western terminus of SR 61; SR 61 takes over concurrency with US 27 though it is signed
			SR 382 north (Patton Lane)	Southern terminus of SR 382; provides access to Roane State Community College
Midtown			Ruritain Road (Old SR 29)	
Midtown			US 70 east (Roane State Highway/SR 1 east) – Kingston	Northern end of US 70/SR 1 concurrency; begin signed portion of SR 29; SR 29 becomes secondary
Midtown			I-40 – Nashville, Knoxville	I-40 exit 350
Harriman			Ruritain Road (Old SR 29)	
Harriman			US 27 south / SR 61 west (S Roane Street) – Rockwood	Southern end of US 27/SR 61 concurrency; end signed portion of SR 29; SR 29 becomes primary
1.000 mi = 1.609 km; 1.000 km = 0.621 mi: Concurrency terminus

U.S. Route 27
Previous state: Georgia	Tennessee	Next state: Kentucky
