= Tennessee State Route 58 =

State highway in Tennessee, United States

State Route 58
- SR 58; primary in red, secondary in blue

Route information
- Maintained by TDOT
- Length: 94.94 mi (152.79 km)
- Existed: October 1, 1923–present

Major junctions
- South end: SR 157 at Georgia State Line in Lookout Mountain
- I-24 / US 27 in Chattanooga; US 41 / US 76 / SR 8 in Chattanooga; US 11 / US 64 / SR 2 in Chattanooga; SR 153 in Chattanooga; SR 60 in Georgetown; SR 30 in Decatur; SR 68 in Ten Mile; SR 72 near Midway; US 70 in Kingston; I-40 in Kingston
- North end: SR 95 in Oak Ridge

Location
- Country: United States
- State: Tennessee
- Counties: Hamilton, Meigs, Roane

Highway system
- Tennessee State Routes; Interstate; US; State
← US 58	→ SR 59

State Route 58 (SR 58), also locally called "Highway 58", is a north–south state highway in the U.S. state of Tennessee that serves as a major route for many communities in Roane, Meigs, and Hamilton counties.

The section of SR 58 in Chattanooga between SR 153 and Ochs Highway is a largely unsigned secondary alignment following other state and local roads before becoming a primary route toward the north of the city.

SR 58 joins I-40 for part of its route in Roane County, from the Kingston exit (352) east to the Oak Ridge exit (356) west of Oak Ridge.

== Route description ==
=== Hamilton County ===
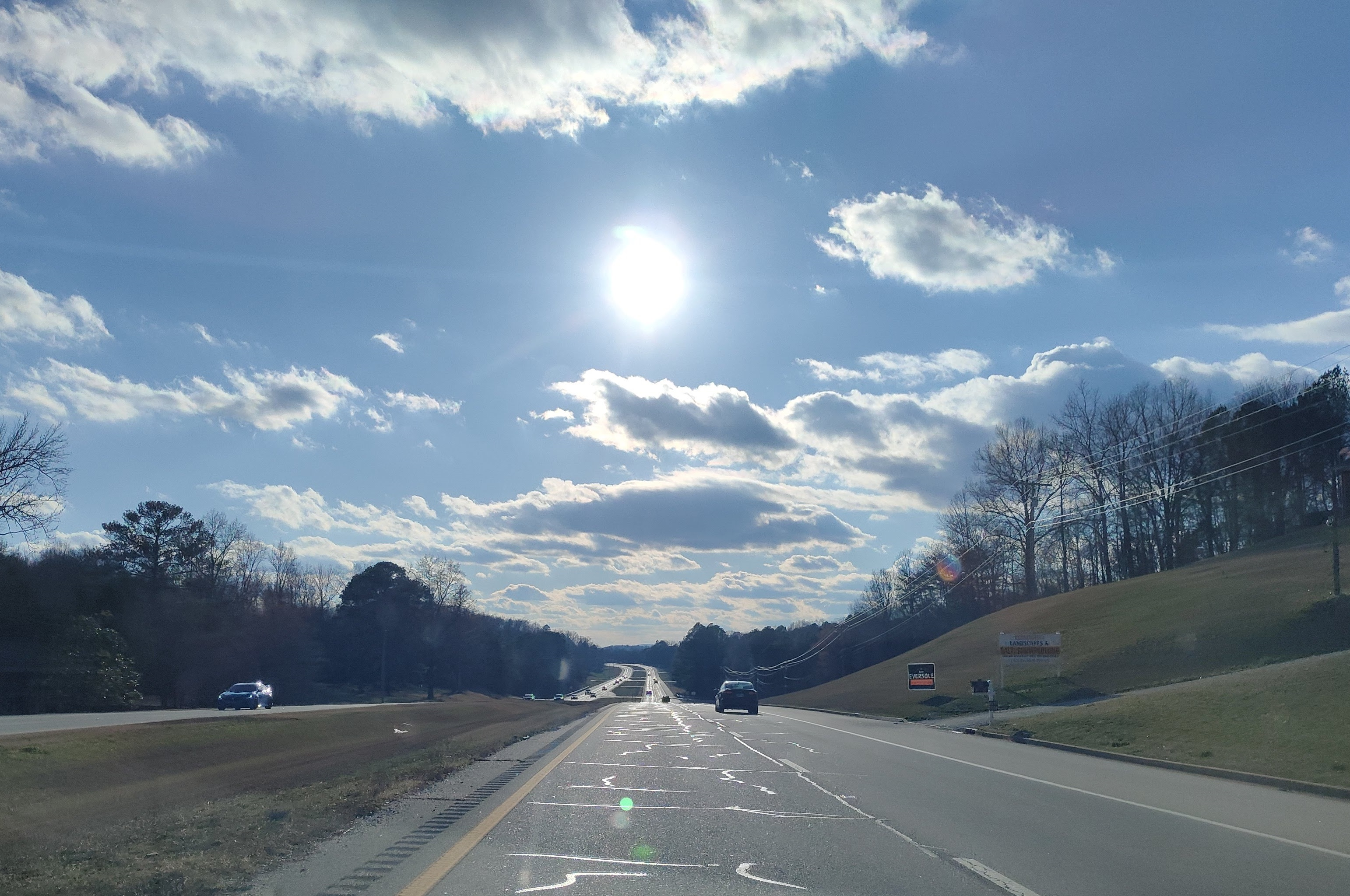
SR 58 in northern Hamilton County near Harrison

SR 58 begins as a secondary highway, known as Ochs Highway, in Hamilton County at the Georgia state line in Lookout Mountain, where the road continues southward as SR 157. It goes north through Lookout Mountain before leaving the scenic town at an intersection and becoming briefly concurrent with SR 17 and entering Chattanooga. It proceeds downtown via Tennessee Avenue, West 40th Street, Alton Park Boulevard, and Market Street. Along Market Street, it has an interchange with I-24/US 27 before turning at East Main Street for a concurrency with US 41/US 76/SR 8. It turns north at Dodds Avenue (US 11/US 64/SR 2) and connects to SR 17 via Bailey Avenue and McCallie Avenue. It eventually comes to an interchange with the SR 153 freeway, where SR 58 becomes a primary highway, going east and leaving Chattanooga. It proceeds straight through Harrison before turning north and crossing Chickamauga Lake, leaving Harrison. SR 58 then intersects and has a short concurrency with SR 312 in the community of Snow Hill, just west of Ooltewah. It continues north to Georgetown, where it has an intersection with SR 60 before crossing into Meigs County.

=== Meigs County ===
In Meigs County, it has an intersection with SR 306 before crossing the Hiwassee River. SR 58 then continues north through the flat fertile farmland of Meigs County before entering Decatur and intersecting SR 30. SR 58 then goes through downtown to intersect SR 304 before going through a small business and residential district before leaving Decatur, continuing north. It continues through farmland to Ten Mile, where it intersects with SR 68. It continues north through Ten Mile, and enters Roane County.

=== Roane County ===
It continues through rural southeast Roane County to an intersection with SR 72 just west of Midway. It continues north and has another intersection with SR 304 before crossing Watts Bar Lake and entering Kingston, immediately passing by Fort Southwest Point. It then runs along the shores of the lake before entering downtown and junctioning with US 70/SR 1. It then continues through downtown to have an interchange and become concurrent with I-40. SR 58 then follows I-40 east for four miles (6.4 km), between exits 352 and 356. At exit 356, SR 58 breaks off and continues north, intersecting SR 326 at the same interchange. SR 58 continues north and crosses over the Clinch River to enter Oak Ridge, immediately passing by the K-25 nuclear weapons facility. It then has an intersection with SR 327 before ending at a trumpet interchange with SR 95, just a few miles outside of Oak Ridge's main business district.

== History ==
The section of SR 58 in Chattanooga between SR 153 and Market St previously followed Amnicola Highway, Riverside Drive, Riverfront Parkway, and 20th Street until a realignment of the downtown routing that took effect November 1, 2001.

== Major intersections ==
County	Location	mi	km	Destinations	Notes
Hamilton	Lookout Mountain	0.0	0.0	SR 157 south (Red Riding Hood Trail) – Lookout Mountain	Georgia state line; southern terminus; provides access to Rock City and Cloudland Canyon State Park; SR 58 begins as a secondary highway
Hamilton	Lookout Mountain			SR 17 south (St. Elmo Avenue) – Chattanooga Valley, GA	Southern end of SR 17 concurrency
Hamilton	Chattanooga			I-24 / US 27 (SR 27/SR 29) – Nashville, Knoxville, Atlanta	I-24/US 27 exit 178 (Market St)
Hamilton	Chattanooga			US 41 south / US 76 west / SR 8 east – Downtown, Chattanooga	East Main St
Hamilton	Chattanooga			US 11 north / US 64 east / SR 2 east – Downtown, Chattanooga	Dodds Avenue to SR 17
Hamilton	Chattanooga			SR 17 north (North Willow Street) – Chattanooga	Continues along East 3rd Street, Dodson Avenue, Glass Street, Campbell Street, and Bonny Oaks Drive
Hamilton	Chattanooga			SR 153 north – Chattanooga	SR 58 becomes a primary highway
Hamilton	Harrison			Bridge over Chickamauga Lake/Wolftever Creek	
Hamilton	Harrison			Harrison Bay Road - Harrison Bay State Park	Main access road into the park
Hamilton	Snow Hill			SR 312 west (Birchwood Pike) – Birchwood	Southern end of SR 312 concurrency
Hamilton	Snow Hill			SR 312 east (Mahan Gap Road) – Cleveland	Northern end of SR 312 concurrency
Hamilton	Georgetown			SR 60 (Georgetown Road) to I-75 – Dayton, Birchwood, Hopewell, Cleveland	
Meigs				SR 306 south (Brittsville Road) – Hopewell	Northern terminus of SR 306
Meigs				Bridge over Hiwassee River	
Meigs	Decatur			SR 30 (William Jennings Bryan Highway/David W. Lilliard Memorial Highway) – Dayton, Athens	
Meigs	Decatur			SR 304 north (River Road) – Ten Mile	Southern terminus of SR 304; provides access to Watts Bar Dam, Watts Bar Lake, and Watts Bar Nuclear Generating Station
Meigs				SR 68 (Watts Bar Highway) – Spring City, Dayton	Provides access to Watts Bar Dam, Watts Bar Lake, and Watts Bar Nuclear Generating Station
Roane				SR 72 east (Loudon Highway) – Midway, Loudon	Western terminus of SR 72
Roane				SR 304 south (River Road) – Ten Mile	Northern terminus of SR 304; provides access to Watts Bar Lake, Watts Bar Dam, and Watts Bar Nuclear Generating Station
Roane	Kingston			Bridge over Watts Bar Lake/Tennessee River	
Roane	Kingston			US 70 (Race Street/SR 1) – Rockwood, Midtown, Farragut, Knoxville	
Roane	Kingston			I-40 west – Nashville	I-40 exit 352; southern end of I-40 concurrency
Roane	Kingston			Lawnville Road	Exit 355
Roane	Kingston			I-40 east – Knoxville SR 326 south (Gallaher Road)	I-40 exit 356 eastbound, 356 A/B westbound; northern end of I-40 concurrency; northern terminus of SR 326
Roane	Oak Ridge			Bridge over the Clinch River	
Roane	Oak Ridge			Bear Creek Road	Interchange; provides access to K-25 and Y-12
Roane	Oak Ridge			SR 327 north (Blair Road) – Harriman, Oliver Springs	Southern terminus of SR 327; provides access to K-25
Roane	Oak Ridge	94.94	152.79	SR 95 (Oak Ridge Turnpike/White Wing Road) – Oak Ridge, Lenoir City	Northern terminus; interchange; provides access to Oak Ridge National Laboratory (ORNL); SR 58 ends as a primary highway
1.000 mi = 1.609 km; 1.000 km = 0.621 mi: Concurrency terminus
