= Tennessee State Route 382 =

State highway in Tennessee, United States

State Route 382
- Patton Lane
- TN 382 highlighted in red

Route information
- Maintained by TDOT
- Length: 1.2 mi (1.9 km)
- Existed: July 1, 1983–present

Major junctions
- South end: US 70 near Rockwood
- North end: US 27 / SR 61 in Cardiff

Location
- Country: United States
- State: Tennessee
- Counties: Roane

Highway system
- Tennessee State Routes; Interstate; US; State
← SR 381	→ SR 383

State Route 382 (SR 382) is a 1.2-mile-long (1.9 km) state highway in Roane County in the eastern portion of the U.S. state of Tennessee. It serves as a connector for US 27/SR 61 and US 70 to Roane State Community College's main campus.

== Route description ==
SR 382 begins at an intersection with US 70/SR 1/SR 29 west of downtown Rockwood and travels to the north through the main campus of Roane State Community College and ends at US 27/SR 61 in Cardiff.

== Major intersections ==
The entire route is in Roane County.

Location	mi	km	Destinations	Notes
	0.0	0.0	US 70 (Roane State Highway/SR 1/SR 29) – Rockwood, Midtown, Kingston	Southern terminus
Cardiff	1.2	1.9	US 27 / SR 61 (N Gateway Boulevard/S Roane Street) – Rockwood, Harriman	Northern terminus
1.000 mi = 1.609 km; 1.000 km = 0.621 mi

== See also ==
- List of state routes in Tennessee
