= U.S. Route 27 =

Highway in the United States

U.S. Route 27
- US 27 highlighted in red

Route information
- Length: 1,356.7 mi (2,183.4 km)
- Existed: 1926–present

Major junctions
- South end: US 1 at Miami, Florida
- I-4 at Davenport, Florida; I-75 at Ocala, Florida; I-10 at Tallahassee, Florida; I-85 at LaGrange, Georgia; I-20 at Bremen, Georgia; I-24 at Chattanooga, Tennessee; I-40 at Harriman, Tennessee; I-64 / I-75 at Lexington, Kentucky; I-71 / I-74 / I-75 at Cincinnati, Ohio; I-70 at Richmond, Indiana
- North end: I-69 / US 24 / US 30 at Fort Wayne, Indiana

Location
- Country: United States
- States: Florida, Georgia, Tennessee, Kentucky, Ohio, Indiana

Highway system
- United States Numbered Highway System; List; Special; Divided
← US 26	→ US 28

U.S. Route 27 or U.S. Highway 27 (US 27) is a north–south United States Numbered Highway in the Southern and Midwestern U.S. The southern terminus is at US 1 in Miami, Florida. The northern terminus is at Interstate 69 (I-69) in Fort Wayne, Indiana. From Miami, it goes up the center of Florida, then west to Tallahassee, Florida, and north through such cities and towns as Columbus, Georgia; Rome, Georgia; Chattanooga, Tennessee; Lexington, Kentucky; Cincinnati, Ohio; Oxford, Ohio; Richmond, Indiana; and Fort Wayne, Indiana. It once extended north through Lansing, Michigan, to Cheboygan, Mackinaw City, and, for about three years, even as far as St. Ignace. US 27 was first signed in 1926, replacing what had been the eastern route of the Dixie Highway in many states.

== Route description ==
Lengths
	mi	km
FL	496.4	798.9
GA	356.1	573.1
TN	144.8	233.0
KY	201.1	323.6
OH	40.6	65.3
IN	117.8	189.6
Total	1,356.7	2,183.4

=== Florida ===
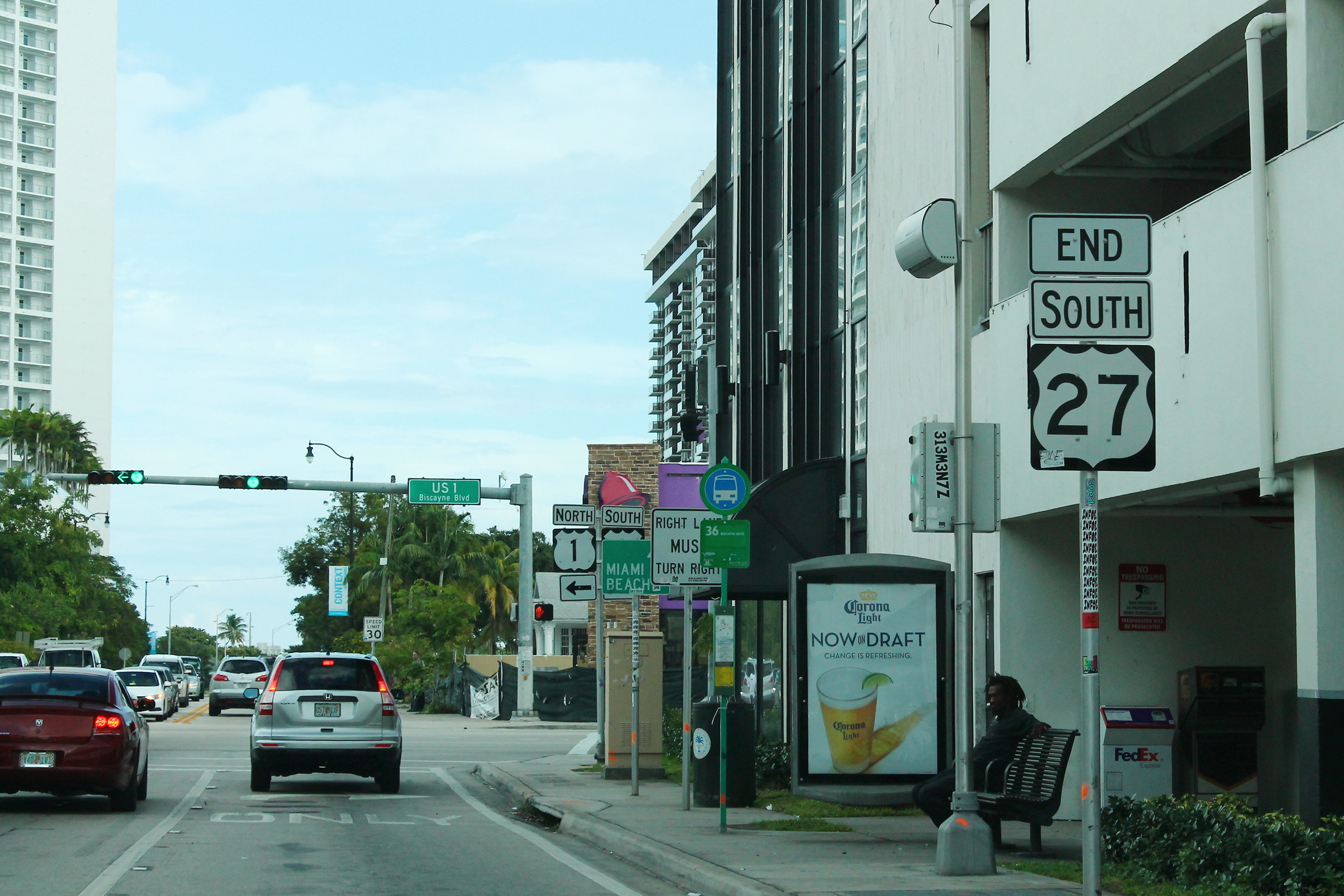
Southern terminus of US 27 at US 1 in Miami, Florida

A US 27 shield used in Florida prior to 1993

In Florida, US 27 has been designated the Claude Pepper Memorial Highway by the Florida Legislature. It was named after long-time Florida U.S. Senator and Representative Claude Pepper. The stretch running from Miami to South Bay was originally designated the Thomas E. Will Memorial Highway by the Florida Legislature in 1937 when that portion was known as State Road 26 (SR 26). Will, the founder of Okeelanta, had been instrumental in getting the state to build the road from Miami to the area south of Lake Okeechobee. Nearly the entire length of US 27 in Florida is a divided highway, with the segment between Williston and Perry carrying only two-way traffic.

US 27 begins as North 36th Street in Midtown Miami, heading west from US 1 for 4.4 miles (7.1 km) before turning northwest to pass under the western terminus of SR 112 (Airport Expressway). It then proceeds northwest for five miles (8.0 km) as South Okeechobee Road, parallel to the Miami Canal, forming the southwest boundary of the city of Hialeah. After an interchange with SR 826 (Palmetto Expressway), it continues northwest as North Okeechobee Road for five miles (8.0 km) before an interchange with the Homestead Extension of Florida's Turnpike (SR 821). After another four miles (6.4 km), the highway curves to the north and, after passing the northern terminus of SR 997 (Krome Avenue), crosses into Broward County.

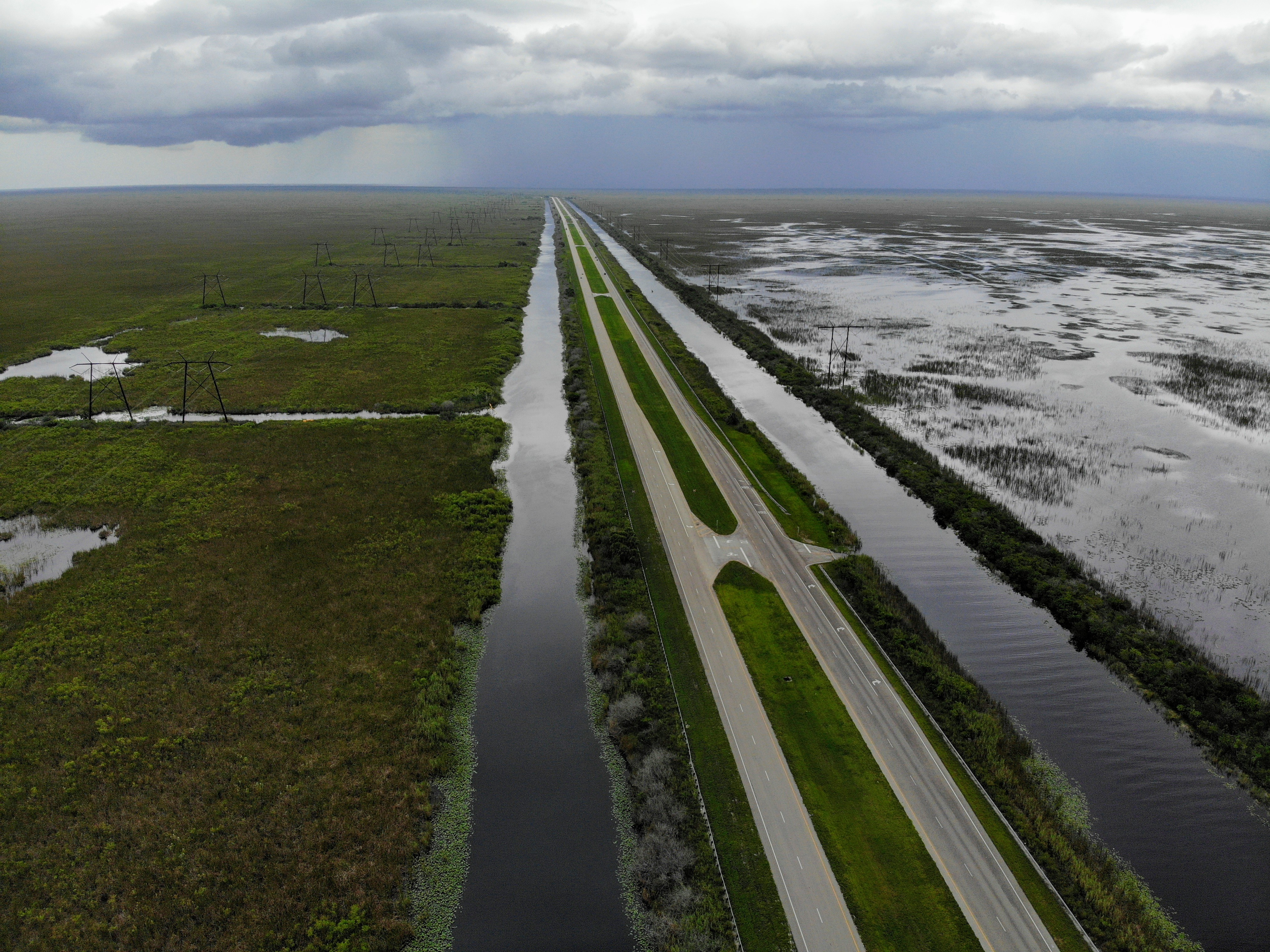
An aerial shot of US 27 north near the Everglades

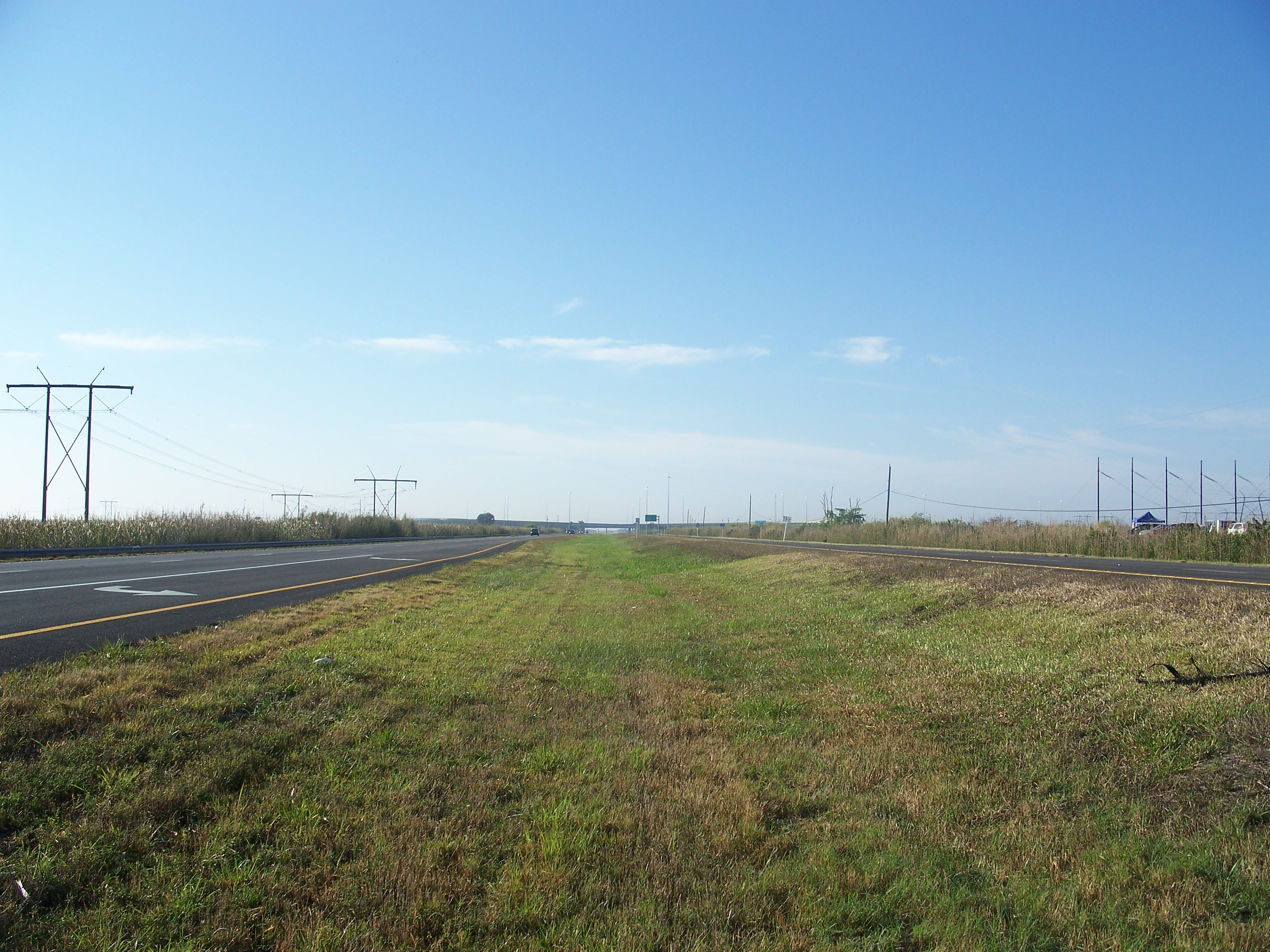
US 27, looking south toward the I-75 interchange near Andytown, Florida

In Broward County, the highway passes protected wetlands and heavy-duty powerlines on the west and the outer reaches of the suburban communities of Pembroke Pines and Weston on the east. US 27 then reaches an interchange with I-75 and Alligator Alley before curving to the northwest toward South Bay and Lake Okeechobee.

The highway skirts the southwestern shore of Lake Okeechobee and then heads west at Clewiston, before making a sharp turn to the north toward Moore Haven. The road then proceeds in a northerly direction toward the central Florida communities of Lake Placid, Sebring, Avon Park, and Lake Wales.

Widening of US 27 to a six-lane highway continues in Polk County. The following sections have been completed and are open to six lanes of traffic:

- SR 60 to SR 540 in Lake Wales
- SR 542 in Dundee to north of I-4 in Davenport

North of I-4, US 27 contains unnumbered interchanges with US 192 and then County Road 474 (CR 474) in Four Corners, SR 50 in Clermont, and SR 19 south of Howey-in-the-Hills, which also includes a southbound interchange with Florida's Turnpike. The northbound turnpike interchange can be found further northwest. US 441 later joins US 27 in Leesburg and US 301 in Belleview, only for the road to break away from both in Ocala.

US 27 resumes its status as its own route until it reaches Williston and joins US 41. This concurrency continues northward until US 41 reaches High Springs and joins US 441. US 27 heads west along the unsigned SR 20 toward Perry and joins US 19 until US 19 breaks away in Capps, but not before resuming a westward direction. In Tallahassee, the road becomes Apalachee Parkway, a major east–west thoroughfare. Constructed in 1957, the Apalachee Parkway starts at SR 61 (Monroe Street) in front of the Florida State Capitol building. It has a short expressway section just east of the capitol, then is a busy four-lane surface boulevard with service roads for the next few miles, passing the Governor's Square mall and many state office buildings. Past Tallahassee, US 27 finally resumes its northwesterly direction. The highway goes through Havana before entering Amsterdam, Georgia.

=== Georgia ===
In Georgia, US 27 has been designated the Martha Berry Highway by the Georgia State Legislature. It was named after Martha Berry, founder of Berry College in Rome. US 27 is a designated Governor's Road Improvement Program (GRIP) developmental highway corridor which will eventually be widened to four lanes (mostly divided) from the Florida state line to the Tennessee state line. All of US 27 in Georgia is concurrent with State Route 1.

=== Tennessee ===
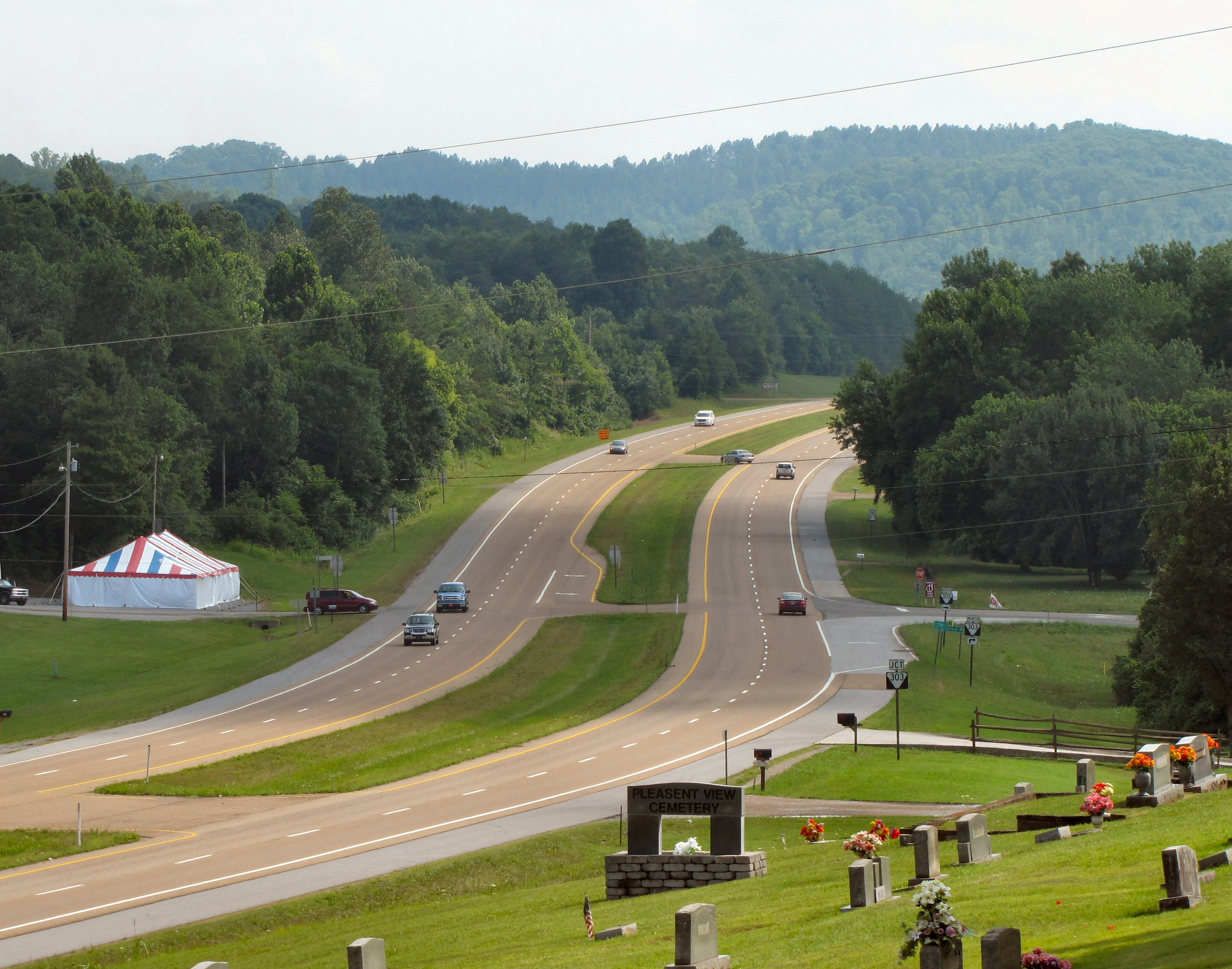
US 27 at its intersection with SR 303, near Graysville, Tennessee

In Chattanooga, a portion of US 27 was once signed as I-124. Though the designation still exists, it is no longer signed as such. In and around the Chattanooga area, US 27 is sometimes referred to as Corridor J, the designation of a road in the Appalachian Development Highway System between Chattanooga and London, Kentucky, intended to follow the route of US 27.

Throughout its approximately 80-mile (130 km) stretch between Chattanooga and Harriman, US 27 traverses a valley between the Tennessee River to the east and the Cumberland Plateau to the west. The plateau's Walden Ridge escarpment is frequently visible to the west. From Chattanooga, the highway passes through Soddy-Daisy. Here, it intersects State Route 111 (SR 111), which veers northwestward across the Plateau into Middle Tennessee. US 27 continues through Sale Creek and Graysville before reaching Dayton. At Dayton, it intersects SR 30, which connects Dayton with Pikeville to the west and Decatur to the east, and SR 60, which connects Dayton with Cleveland to the southeast. US 27 continues northward through Evensville before arriving at Spring City. At Spring City, it intersects SR 68, which connects the area to Crossville, atop the plateau to the west.

From here, US 27 enters Roane County, running concurrently with US 70 going through the city of Rockwood. After US 70 splits to the east, US 27 runs concurrently with SR 61 through Harriman, where it is crossed by I-40. During this stretch, it forms part of the Harvey H. Hannah Memorial Highway and is signed as such. Just beyond Harriman, near the DeArmond community, US 27 ascends the Cumberland Plateau and continues northward across the plateau for its remaining 55 miles (89 km) or so in Tennessee.

In Morgan County, the highway passes through Wartburg and Sunbright. At Elgin, it intersects SR 52, which connects the area with the historic village of Rugby and Fentress County to the west. Beyond Elgin, US 27 passes through Robbins, Huntsville, and Helenwood before reaching Oneida in Scott County. In Oneida, US 27 intersects SR 297, which continues westward into the Big South Fork National River and Recreation Area. A short time later, US 27 intersects with SR 456, which continues to SR 63. After coming to a stop, it then makes a sharp left turn to go through downtown Oneida. After a further five to seven miles (8.0 to 11.3 km), it then reaches Winfield. Winfield is the last sizable town that US 27 passes through in Tennessee before it reaches the community of Isham on the Kentucky border.

=== Kentucky ===
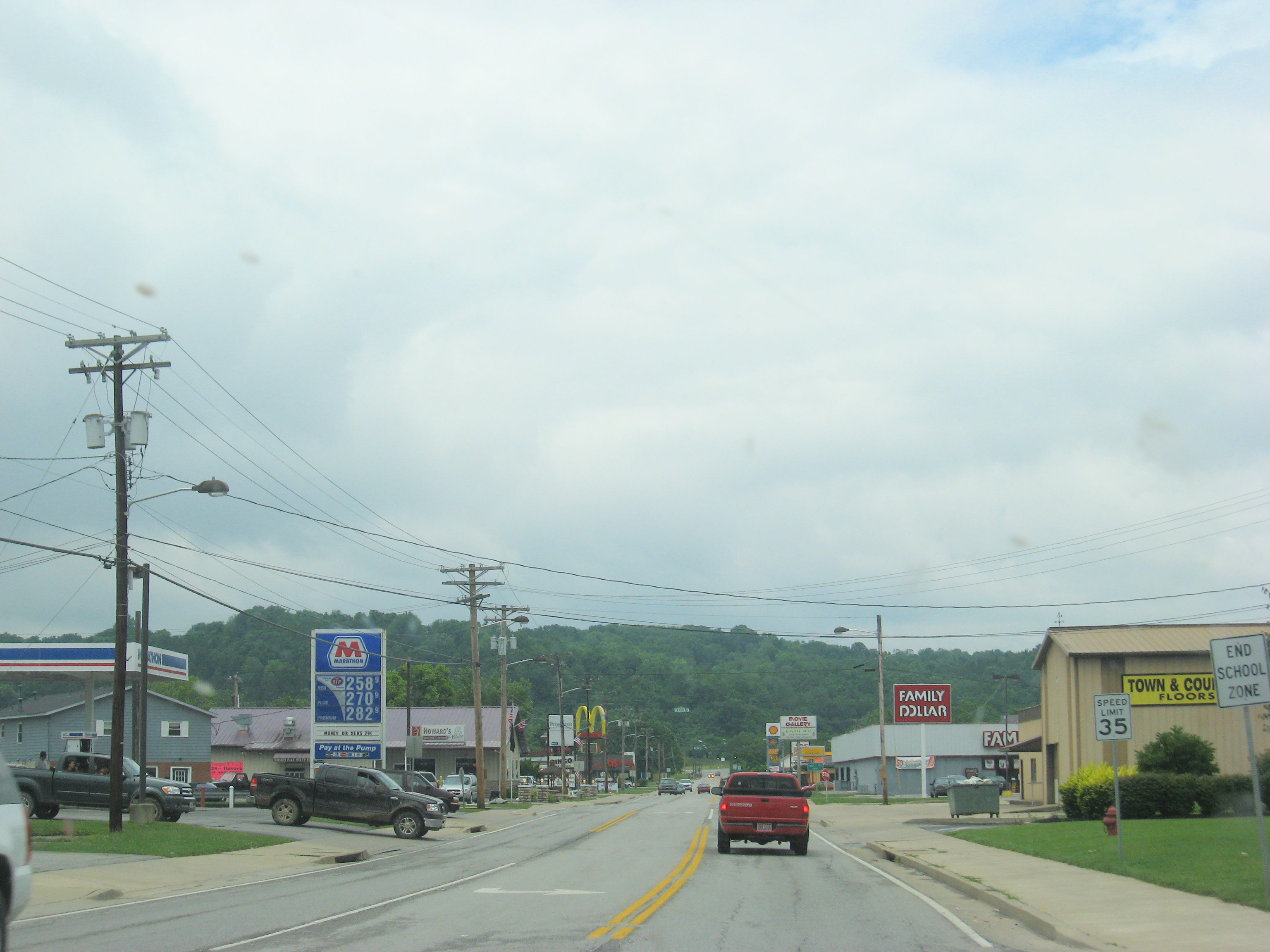
US 27 in Falmouth, Kentucky

US 27 enters Kentucky near Whitley City. The first major town it goes through is Somerset, followed by Stanford, Lancaster, Nicholasville, and Lexington, where it begins a concurrency with US 68 that continues to Paris. US 27 continues north from there through Cynthiana, Falmouth, Alexandria, Cold Spring, Highland Heights, Fort Thomas, Southgate, and Newport before crossing into Ohio at Cincinnati via the Taylor–Southgate Bridge. From its junction with I-471 in Highland Heights through most of Campbell County, it is a four-lane highway, as it is with the US 68 concurrency and south from Lexington to Kentucky Route 34. It has four lanes from the northern boundary of Pulaski County to just south of the Cumberland River (Lake Cumberland) bridge at Burnside.

=== Ohio ===
US 27 crosses into Ohio and Downtown Cincinnati via the Taylor–Southgate Bridge. US 27 follows Mehring Way, Central Avenue, Ezzard Charles Drive, and Central Parkway through Downtown Cincinnati. US 27 briefly duplexes with I-75, exiting at I-74 for another brief duplex before exiting onto Colerain Avenue. US 27 then continues northwest eventually to Oxford and then reaches the Indiana border another six miles (9.7 km) northwest at College Corner.

Overall, US 27 is in Ohio for 40.6 miles (65.3 km): 18.5 miles (29.8 km) in Hamilton County and another 22.1 miles (35.6 km) in Butler County.

=== Indiana ===
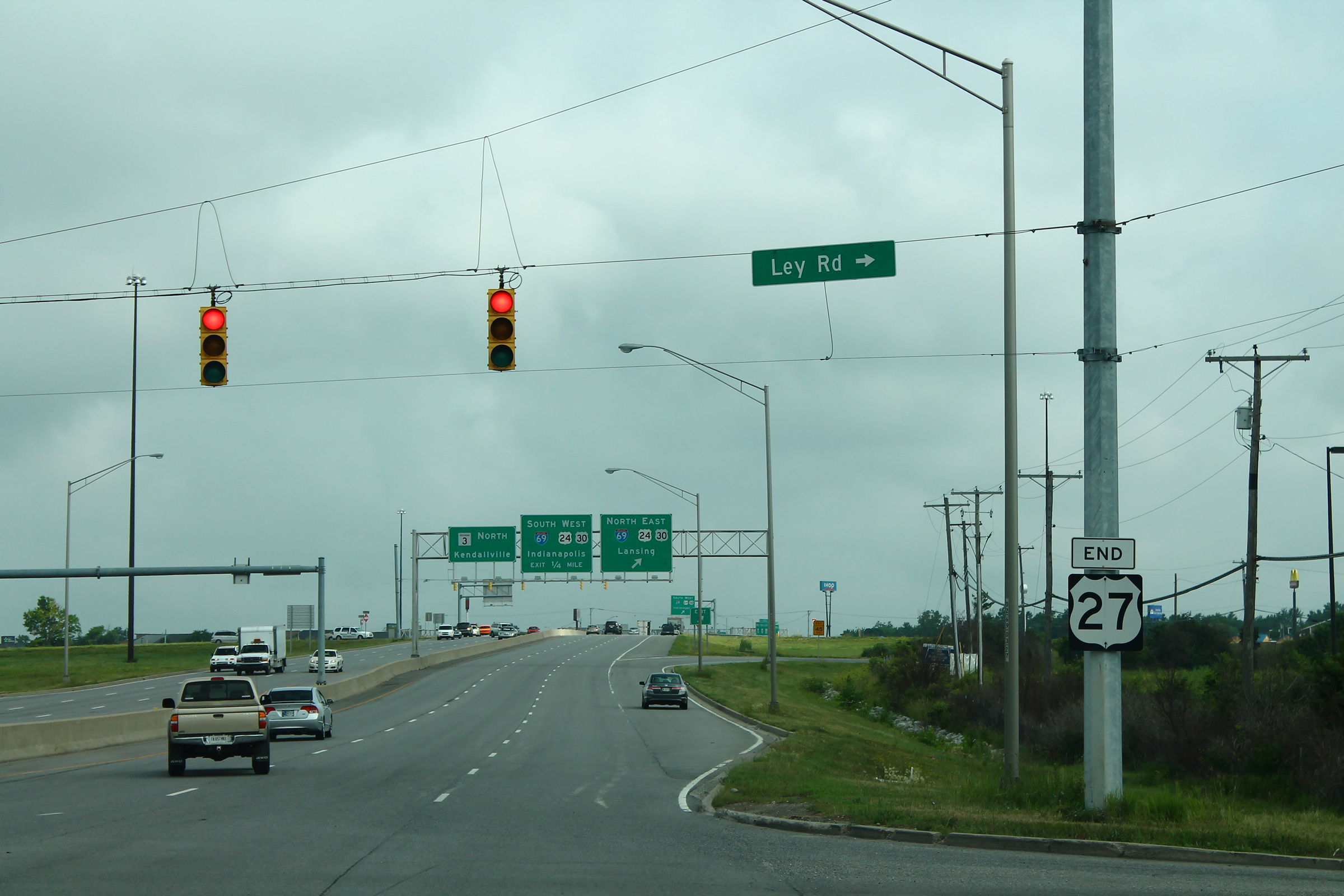
Northern terminus of US 27 at the intersection with I-69/US 24/US 30 in Fort Wayne, Indiana

US 27 enters the southeastern part of Indiana south of the town of Liberty. At Liberty, US 27 turns north, paralleling the Ohio state line. It intersects I-70 at Richmond and continues north to Decatur. US 33 joins US 27 just south of Decatur and the two routes share a northwesterly alignment on a divided surface highway from Decatur to I-469 south of Fort Wayne. US 33 turns west and follows I-469, while US 27 continues north into downtown Fort Wayne as the one-way pair of Lafayette Street and Clinton Street. North of downtown, US 27 follows Lima Road to its terminus at I-69/US 30 (Lima Road continues north from this point as State Road 3, or SR 3).

== History ==
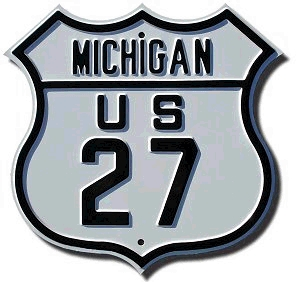
US 27 no longer exists in Michigan. It has been replaced by I-69, I-75, and US 127.

Originally, the southern terminus of US 27 was in Cincinnati, Ohio. In 1928, the route was extended south to Chattanooga, Tennessee, then to Tallahassee, Florida, in 1934. In 1949, it was extended to its current terminus in Miami. At its northern end, US 27 originally terminated at Cheboygan, Michigan. In 1937, the route was extended concurrently with US 23 to Mackinaw City, where it ended at the Michigan State Auto Ferry Dock along with US 23 and US 31. After the completion of the Mackinac Bridge in 1957, US 27 was extended across the bridge to the current intersection of I-75 and US 2 near St. Ignace. In 1961, what became I-75 was completed, enabling the roadway to be designated as I-75. At the same time, US 27 was truncated to an interchange with I-75 six miles (9.7 km) south of Grayling. In 2002, the northern terminus was moved to its current location.

From Grayling to I-69 near Lansing, the road is now designated US 127. US 27 signs were removed from I-69 between Lansing and Fort Wayne in 2001. Officially, the current northern terminus is at the junction of I-69, US 30, and SR 3, but heading north on I-69 one will still see US 27 shields on some of the older overhead signs heading to the I-469 interchange on the northern edge of Fort Wayne.

=== Indiana ===
On March 9, 2007, legislation was introduced in the Indiana House of Representatives to designate US 27 as historic highway. Richmond, one of the cities US 27 passes through, would have two historic highways passing through it. The original National Road (US 40) runs through Richmond.

=== Michigan ===
US 27 was one of the highways in Michigan to carry the "To I-75" designation when I-75 was being constructed.

The at-grade routing of US 27 in Michigan has been largely superseded by I-75, which follows a roughly similar route and in some places actually replaced the older highway. From Lansing north to I-75, the former US 27 is now US 127; from Lansing south to Fort Wayne, US 27 was replaced by I-69. In many places the route markers and the highway itself serve to connect local communities bypassed by the Interstate Highway.

== Major intersections ==
Florida
US 1 in Miami
US 441 in Miami
I-75 in Weston
US 98 south-southeast of Sebring. The highways travel concurrently to east of West Frostproof.
US 17 / US 92 in Haines City
I-4 in Davenport
US 192 in Four Corners
US 441 in Leesburg. The highways travel concurrently to Ocala.
US 301 in Belleview. The highways travel concurrently to Ocala.
I-75 in Ocala
US 41 in Williston. The highways travel concurrently to High Springs.
US 129 east of Branford. The highways travel concurrently to Branford.
US 221 in Perry
US 19 / US 98 in Perry. US 19/US 27 travel concurrently to Capps.
US 319 in Tallahassee
US 90 in Tallahassee
I-10 in Tallahassee
Georgia
US 84 in Bainbridge. The highways travel concurrently through the city.
US 280 in Cusseta. The highways travel concurrently to Columbus.
I-185 in Fort Benning
US 80 in Columbus
I-185 southeast of LaGrange
I-85 in LaGrange
US 29 in LaGrange. The highways travel concurrently through the city.
I-20 in Bremen
US 78 in Bremen
US 278 in Cedartown. The highways travel concurrently through the city.
US 411 in Six Mile. The highways travel concurrently to Rome.
Tennessee
I-24 in Chattanooga. The highways travel concurrently through the city.
US 41 in Chattanooga
I-124 in Chattanooga. The highways travel concurrently through the city.
US 127 in Chattanooga
US 70 south-southwest of Rockwood. The highways travel concurrently into Rockwood.
I-40 in Harriman
Kentucky
US 150 in Stanford
US 68 in Lexington. The highways travel concurrently to Paris.
US 60 in Lexington. The highways travel concurrently through the city.
US 25 / US 60 / US 421 in Lexington
I-64 / I-75 in Lexington
US 460 in Paris
US 62 in Cynthiana. The highways travel concurrently through the city.
I-471 in Highland Heights
I-471 on the Fort Thomas–Southgate city line
Ohio
US 42 / US 50 / US 52 in Cincinnati. The highways travel concurrently through the city.
US 22 in Cincinnati
US 127 in Cincinnati
I-75 in Cincinnati
I-74 in Cincinnati
I-275 in Bevis
Indiana
US 40 in Richmond
I-70 in Richmond
US 36 in Lynn
US 33 in Decatur. The highways travel concurrently to south-southeast of Fort Wayne.
US 224 in Decatur. The highways travel concurrently through the city.
I-469 / US 24 / US 33 south-southeast of Fort Wayne
I-69 / US 24 / US 30 in Fort Wayne
SR 3 in Fort Wayne

== Related routes ==
- U.S. Route 127
- U.S. Route 227
