= Tennessee State Route 302 =

State highway in Tennessee, United States

State Route 302
- SR 302 highlighted in red

Route information
- Maintained by TDOT
- Length: 13.3 mi (21.4 km)
- Existed: July 1, 1983–present

Major junctions
- South end: SR 30 in Old Washington
- SR 68 near Spring City
- North end: US 27 in Spring City

Location
- Country: United States
- State: Tennessee
- Counties: Rhea

Highway system
- Tennessee State Routes; Interstate; US; State
← SR 301	→ SR 303

State Route 302 (SR 302) is a 13.3-mile-long (21.4 km) north–south state highway in Rhea County, Tennessee.

== Route description ==
SR 302 begins in Old Washington at an intersection with SR 30. It winds its way north through farmland as Old Dixie Highway and Old Stage Road. It then has a short concurrency with SR 68 before following along the banks of Watts Bar Lake (as New Lake Road) to enter Spring City, where SR 302 comes to an end at an intersection with US 27/SR 29. The entire route of SR 302 is a two-lane highway.

== Major intersections ==
The entire route is in Rhea County.

Location	mi	km	Destinations	Notes
Old Washington	0.0	0.0	SR 30 (Old Washington Highway) – Dayton, Decatur	Southern terminus
			SR 68 south (Watts Bar Highway) – Sweetwater	Southern end of SR 68 concurrency; provides access to Watts Bar Dam and Watts Bar Nuclear Plant
			SR 68 north (Watts Bar Highway) – Crossville	Northern end of SR 68 concurrency
Spring City	13.3	21.4	US 27 (Rhea County Highway/SR 29) – Dayton, Evensville, Rockwood	Northern terminus
1.000 mi = 1.609 km; 1.000 km = 0.621 mi: Concurrency terminus
