= Tennessee State Route 305 =

Highway in Tennessee

State Route 305
- SR 305 highlighted in red

Route information
- Maintained by TDOT
- Length: 13.7 mi (22.0 km)
- Existed: July 1, 1983–present

Major junctions
- South end: SR 30 / SR 39 in Athens
- US 11 in Athens; I-75 near Athens
- North end: SR 68 in rural northeastern Meigs County

Location
- Country: United States
- State: Tennessee
- Counties: McMinn, Meigs

Highway system
- Tennessee State Routes; Interstate; US; State
← SR 304	→ SR 306

State Route 305 (SR 305) is a north-south state highway, although it goes in a more northwest-southeast direction, in Meigs and McMinn counties of East Tennessee.

== Route description ==
SR 305 begins in McMinn County in downtown Athens at an intersection with SR 30 and SR 39. It goes north through neighborhoods along Ingleside Avenue to have an intersection with US 11/SR 2. The highway then turns northwest to leave Athens and have an interchange with I-75 at exit 52. It continues northwest through farmland and rural areas to cross into Meigs County. It continues northwest through farmland before coming to an end at an intersection with SR 68. The entire route of SR 305 is a two-lane highway.

== Major intersections ==
County	Location	mi	km	Destinations	Notes
McMinn	Athens	0.0	0.0	SR 30 / SR 39 (Green Street/East Washington Avenue/East Madison Avenue) – Decatur, Etowah, Riceville, Englewood	Southern terminus
McMinn	Athens			US 11 (Congress Parkway North/SR 2) – Cleveland, Calhoun, Niota, Sweetwater	
McMinn				I-75 – Chattanooga, Knoxville	I-75 exit 52
Meigs		13.7	22.0	SR 68 – Spring City, Sweetwater	Northern terminus; provides access to Watts Bar Dam, Watts Bar Nuclear Plant, and Watts Bar Lake
1.000 mi = 1.609 km; 1.000 km = 0.621 mi
