= Tennessee State Route 304 =

State highway in Tennessee, United States

State Route 304
- River Road
- SR 304 highlighted in red

Route information
- Maintained by TDOT
- Length: 30.00 mi (48.28 km)
- Existed: July 1, 1983–present

Major junctions
- South end: SR 58 in Decatur
- SR 68 near Ten Mile
- North end: SR 58 near Kingston

Location
- Country: United States
- State: Tennessee
- Counties: Meigs, Roane

Highway system
- Tennessee State Routes; Interstate; US; State
← SR 303	→ SR 305

State Route 304 (SR 304) is a state highway in Meigs and Roane counties in the eastern portion of the U.S. state of Tennessee. It connects Decatur to Kingston via SR 68 and Ten Mile. It provides access to many marinas and lakeside homes along Watts Bar Lake.

== Route description ==
SR 304 begins in Meigs County in Decatur at SR 58 and heads north and after 2.4 miles (3.9 km) it begins to follow closely to the Tennessee River and Chickamauga Lake (and past Watts Bar Dam, Watts Bar Lake). It passes close to Watts Bar Dam and across the river is Watts Bar Nuclear Generating Station.

In the same area as the dam, SR 304 junctions with SR 68 and begins a 0.6-mile (0.97 km)-long wrong-way concurrency. Then it turns east on SR 68 toward Sweetwater to a junction where SR 304 turns northward and SR 68 continues southeast.

SR 304 again begins to follow closely to the Tennessee River and enters the community of Ten Mile and passes some businesses, marinas and the community's post office.

It then leaves the river for a short distance and enters Roane County and continues to follow the river, until it comes to an end at SR 58 south of Kingston and north of Ten Mile.

== Major junctions ==
County	Location	mi	km	Destinations	Notes
Meigs	Decatur	0.0	0.0	SR 58 (Meigs County Highway) – Chattanooga, Georgetown, Kingston	Southern terminus
Meigs				SR 68 north – Spring City	Southern end of wrong-way SR 68 concurrency; provides access to Watts Bar Dam and Watts Bar Nuclear Generating Station
Meigs				SR 68 south – Sweetwater	Northern end of wrong-way SR 68 concurrency
Roane		30.0	48.3	SR 58 (Decatur Highway) – Kingston, Decatur	Northern terminus
1.000 mi = 1.609 km; 1.000 km = 0.621 mi: Concurrency terminus
