= Tennessee State Route 378 =

State highway in Tennessee, United States

State Route 378
- Market Street
- TN 378 highlighted in red

Route information
- Maintained by TDOT
- Length: 2.0 mi (3.2 km)
- Existed: July 1, 1983–present

Major junctions
- South end: US 27 / SR 60 in Dayton
- SR 30 in Dayton
- North end: US 27 in Dayton

Location
- Country: United States
- State: Tennessee
- Counties: Rhea

Highway system
- Tennessee State Routes; Interstate; US; State
← SR 377	→ SR 379

State Route 378 (SR 378) is a 2-mile-long (3.2 km) state highway located in Dayton, Rhea County, in the U.S. state of Tennessee.

== Route description ==
SR 378 begins at an intersection with US 27/SR 60 and travels to the west, then marks a sharp turn and travels to the northeast toward Downtown Dayton. In downtown, it has a brief 0.2-mile-long (0.32 km) concurrency with SR 30. It continues northward and comes to and at an interchange with US 27.

== History ==
SR 378 follows the former route of US 27 through downtown Dayton before the 4-lane bypass was built to the southeast.

== Major intersections ==
The entire route is in Dayton, Rhea County.

mi	km	Destinations	Notes
0	0.0	US 27 (SR 29/Rhea County Highway) / SR 60 south (Hiwassee Highway) – Chattanooga, Spring City, Cleveland	Southern terminus of SR 378; Northern terminus of SR 60
1.3	2.1	SR 30 east (Third Street) – Decatur	Southern end of SR 30 concurrency
1.5	2.4	SR 30 west (Dayton Mountain Highway) – Pikeville	Northern end of SR 30 concurrency
1.99	3.20	US 27 (SR 29/Rhea County Highway) – Spring City, Harriman, Chattanooga	Northern terminus
1.000 mi = 1.609 km; 1.000 km = 0.621 mi: Concurrency terminus
