= Tennessee State Route 306 =

Highway in Tennessee

State Route 306
- Eureka Road; Lower River Road
- SR 306 highlighted in red

Route information
- Maintained by TDOT
- Length: 11.1 mi (17.9 km)
- Existed: July 1, 1983–present

Major junctions
- South end: SR 60 in Hopewell
- SR 308 in northwest Bradley County
- North end: SR 58 in Brittsville

Location
- Country: United States
- State: Tennessee
- Counties: Bradley, Meigs

Highway system
- Tennessee State Routes; Interstate; US; State
← SR 305	→ SR 307

State Route 306 (SR 306) is a secondary state route in Bradley and Meigs counties in Tennessee.

== Route description ==
SR 306 begins at an intersection with SR 60 in the unincorporated community of Hopewell a few miles northwest of Cleveland in Bradley County. The route continues north as Eureka Road through mostly farmland for several miles. Several miles later the route passes through the Chickamauga Lake Wildlife Management Area before coming to an intersection with the western terminus of SR 308 (Lower River Road). To continue on SR 306, northbound motorists must stop and make a left turn at this intersection; the southbound lane of SR 306 contains a stop sign at this intersection. Continuing as Lower River Road and running south of the Chickamauga Lake embayment of the Hiwassee River, SR 308 travels more westerly, and a few miles later crosses into Meigs County, becoming Brittsville Road. A few miles later, SR 306 reaches its northern terminus with SR 58 in the unincorporated community of Brittsville.

== Major intersections ==
County	Location	mi	km	Destinations	Notes
Bradley	Hopewell	0.0	0.0	SR 60 (Georgetown Road) to I-75 – Georgetown, Cleveland	Southern terminus
Bradley				SR 308 east (Lower River Road) – Charleston	Western terminus of SR 308
Meigs	Brittsville	11.1	17.9	SR 58 – Chattanooga, Georgetown, Decatur	Northern terminus
1.000 mi = 1.609 km; 1.000 km = 0.621 mi
