= Hopewell, Bradley County, Tennessee =

Hopewell, Tennessee ᎤᏚᎩᎠᎹᏢᏗᏱ (Cherokee)
- CDP
- Location of Hopewell, Tennessee
- Coordinates: 35°14′6″N 84°54′19″W
- Country: United States
- State: Tennessee
- County: Bradley

Area
  - Total: 7.12 sq mi (18.43 km^{2})
  - Land: 7.12 sq mi (18.43 km^{2})
  - Water: 0 sq mi (0.00 km^{2})
- Elevation: 728 ft (222 m)

Population (2020)
  - Total: 2,087
  - Density: 293.2/sq mi (113.22/km^{2})
- Time zone: UTC-5 (Eastern (EST))
  - Summer (DST): UTC-4 (EDT)
- FIPS code: 47-35880
- GNIS feature ID: 1288284

Hopewell (Cherokee: ᎤᏚᎩᎠᎹᏢᏗᏱ, romanized: udugiamatlvdiyi) is a census-designated place (CDP) and unincorporated community in Bradley County, Tennessee, United States. The population was 2,087 at the 2020 Census. It is included in the Cleveland, Tennessee Metropolitan Statistical Area.

== History ==
The Hopewell Community was first settled by European Americans in the early 1820s when the area was still part of the Cherokee Nation, and has the distinction of being home to the first church and post office in Bradley County. The community reportedly received its name when the first church was built and someone said "I hope they do well." Candies Creek (originally Candy's Creek), which flows through the community, was originally called "Little Kiuka Creek" by the Cherokees, and was named for Henry Candy, a Cherokee who relocated his home to a location along the creek around 1817. The Candy's Creek Mission was organized along the creek in the community in 1824 by Samuel Worcester and William Holland as a Christian mission to the Cherokees. Both were based at the Brainerd Mission in Chattanooga. A school was begun at the mission on February 2, 1825, and other nearby schools were established shortly thereafter. The first post office in Bradley County was established in the community in March 1825, with Holland named postmaster, but discontinued in April 1826. On September 25, 1825, Candy's Creek Presbyterian Church was organized at the mission by Worcester, Holland and his wife Electra Hopkins, Thomas Stedman, and six Cherokees. This was reportedly the first church in Bradley County. The mission was closed in 1838 during the Cherokee removal. Notable Cherokees who were educated at the mission include Jesse Bushyhead, Dennis Bushyhead, and Stephen Foreman.

A Tennessee Historical Commission historical marker, commemorating the mission station was installed along SR 60 in 1959 near the location of the mission, and unknowingly disappeared, reportedly in the late 1980s when Paul Huff Parkway was constructed.

== Geography ==
Hopewell is located at 35°14′6″N 84°54′19″W (35.234923, -84.905227).

According to the United States Census Bureau, the CDP has a total area of 7.1 square miles (18 km^{2}), all land. It sits at an elevation of approximately 722 feet (220 m) above sea level, one of the lowest elevations in Bradley County.

Hopewell is centered on the intersection of State Route 60 (SR 60, Georgetown Road) with the southern terminus of SR 306 (Eureka Road) and northern terminus of Freewill Road. It is about six miles (9.7 km) northwest of downtown Cleveland, and five miles (8.0 km) southeast of Georgetown. Due to massive growth to the north and northwest, the city limits of Cleveland now reach less than one mile (1.6 km) from the center of the community.

== Demographics ==
Historical population
Census	Pop.	Note	%±
2000	1,815		—
2010	1,874		3.3%
2020	2,087		11.4%

=== 2020 Census ===
As of the 2020 United States census, there were 2,087 people.

=== 2000 Census ===
As of the census of 2000, there were 1,815 people, 688 households, and 564 families residing in the CDP. The population density was 250.4 inhabitants per square mile (96.7/km^{2}). There were 713 housing units at an average density of 98.4 per square mile (38.0/km^{2}). The racial makeup of the CDP was 96.09% White, 1.93% African American, 0.39% Native American, 0.11% Asian, 0.61% from other races, and 0.88% from two or more races. Hispanic or Latino of any race were 1.65% of the population.

There were 688 households, out of which 34.0% had children under the age of 18 living with them, 72.1% were married couples living together, 8.4% had a female householder with no husband present, and 18.0% were non-families. 15.3% of all households were made up of individuals, and 5.5% had someone living alone who was 65 years of age or older. The average household size was 2.63 and the average family size was 2.89.

In the CDP, the population was spread out, with 23.6% under the age of 18, 6.6% from 18 to 24, 28.4% from 25 to 44, 30.8% from 45 to 64, and 10.6% who were 65 years of age or older. The median age was 40 years. For every 100 females, there were 101.0 males. For every 100 females age 18 and over, there were 94.5 males.

The median income for a household in the CDP was $43,973, and the median income for a family was $46,250. Males had a median income of $34,429 versus $23,981 for females. The per capita income for the CDP was $21,391. About 8.9% of families and 9.3% of the population were below the poverty line, including 7.1% of those under age 18 and 10.9% of those age 65 or over.
