= Tennessee State Route 68 =

Highway in Tennessee

State Route 68
- SR 68 mainline in red

Route information
- Maintained by TDOT
- Length: 106.89 mi (172.02 km)
- Existed: October 1, 1923–present

Major junctions
- South end: SR 5 / SR 60 at the Georgia state line in Copperhill
- US 64 / US 74 in Ducktown; SR 165 (Cherohala Skyway) in Tellico Plains; US 411 in Madisonville; I-75 in Sweetwater; US 27 near Spring City
- North end: US 127 in Crossville

Location
- Country: United States
- State: Tennessee
- Counties: Polk, Monroe, McMinn, Meigs, Rhea, Cumberland

Highway system
- Tennessee State Routes; Interstate; US; State
← SR 67	→ SR 69

State Route 68 (SR 68) is a 106.89-mile-long (172.02 km) state highway in the eastern part of the U.S. state of Tennessee.

== Route description ==
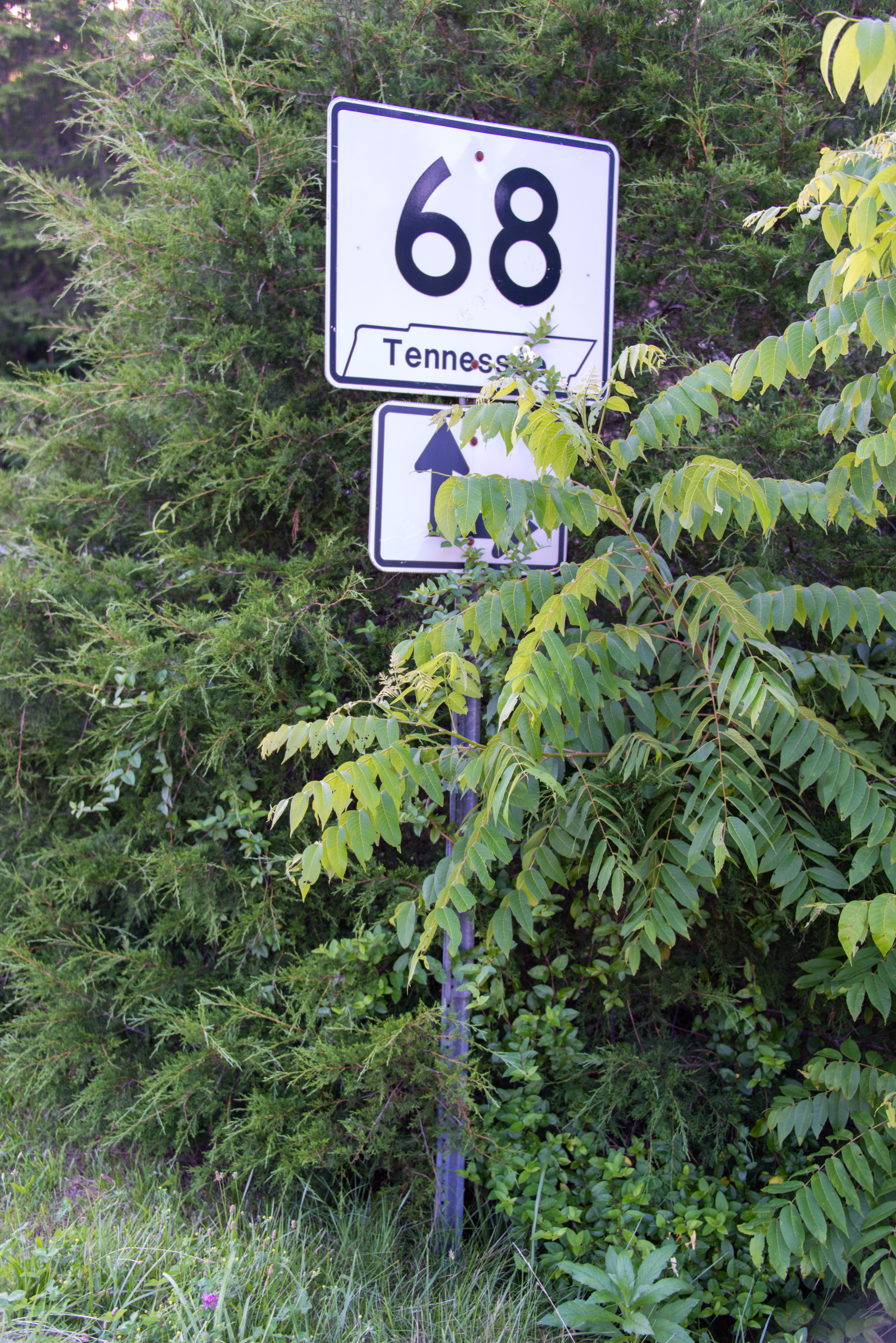
SR 68 sign, near Farner

SR 68 begins in southeastern Tennessee, at an intersection with Georgia State Route 5 (SR 5) and SR 60 at the Tennessee–Georgia state line in Copperhill, Tennessee, and McCaysville, Georgia. It then goes north to Ducktown where it junctions with U.S. Route 64 (US 64) and US 74. The route continues north and enters the Cherokee National Forest and goes through a mostly rural area, then in Turtletown it turns east and junctions with SR 123. SR 68 then turns back north and continues through a sparsely populated area and crosses over the Hiwassee River. The route then becomes curvy and dangerous. It then enters Monroe County and goes through Coker Creek and then Tellico Plains and junctions with SR 165 (Cherohala Skyway). In Tellico Plains, SR 68 serves as the eastern terminus for SR 39; it then proceeds north to Madisonville where it meets US 411/SR 33. Just north of this intersection, USBR 21 follows SR 68 on the shoulder for just over 1.51 miles. In just over 2.23 miles, it passes The Lost Sea and the northern terminus of SR 307, the route then turns more northwesterly as it enters Sweetwater. In Sweetwater, it turns west and junctions with US 11 and Interstate 75 (I-75).

Just past the I-75 junction, the route enters McMinn County where there are no highway junctions. It then enters Meigs County and Ten Mile and junctions with SR 305, SR 58, and brief runs concurrently with SR 304. It then crosses Watts Bar Dam and the Tennessee River into Rhea County near the Watts Bar Nuclear Plant and continues west. The route then has a one-mile-long (1.6 km) concurrency with SR 302 and a 2.7-mile-long (4.3 km) concurrency with US 27/SR 29. US 27 and SR 68 go north to Spring City where SR 68 turns back west and US 27 goes north. Just after leaving Spring City, it turns back to north crosses over Waldens Ridge into Cumberland County where the route ends at a Y-intersection with US 127/SR 28 in Cumberland Homesteads near Crossville and Cumberland Mountain State Park.

== Major intersections ==
County	Location	mi	km	Destinations	Notes
Polk	Copperhill	0.0	0.0	SR 5 south (Blue Ridge Drive) / SR 60 south (Toccoa Avenue) – McCaysville, Mineral Bluff, Blue Ridge	Southern terminus; continuation beyond Georgia state line
Polk	Ducktown			US 64 / US 74 (SR 40) – Cleveland, Murphy, NC, Ocoee River	Interchange
Polk				SR 123 east to NC 294 – Hiwassee Dam	Western terminus of SR 123
Monroe	Tellico Plains			SR 165 east (Cherohala Skyway) – Tellico Plains, Bald River Falls, Indian Boundary, Cherokee National Forest	Western terminus of SR 165
Monroe	Tellico Plains			SR 39 west (Mecca Pike) – Etowah, Englewood	Eastern terminus of SR 39
Monroe	Madisonville			US 411 (SR 33) – Englewood, Vonore	Interchange
Monroe	Christianburg			SR 307 south (Eastanaula Road) – Athens	Northern terminus of SR 307
Monroe	Sweetwater			US 11 (Main Street/SR 2) – Downtown, Philadelphia, Loudon, Niota, Athens	
Monroe	Sweetwater			I-75 – Chattanooga, Knoxville	I-75 exit 60
Meigs				SR 305 south – Athens	Northern terminus of SR 305
Meigs	Ten Mile			SR 58 – Decatur, Kingston	
Meigs	Ten Mile			SR 304 north – Ten Mile, Kingston	Southern end of SR 304 concurrency
Meigs				SR 304 south – Decatur	Northern end of SR 304 concurrency
Tennessee River				Bridge over Watts Bar Dam	
Rhea				SR 302 south (Old Stage Road)	Southern end of SR 302 concurrency
Rhea				SR 302 north (New Lake Road)	Northern end of SR 302 concurrency
Rhea				US 27 south (SR 29) – Dayton, Chattanooga	Southern end of US 27 / SR 29 concurrency
Rhea	Spring City			US 27 north (SR 29) – Rockwood	Interchange; northern end of US 27 / SR 29 concurrency
Cumberland	Cumberland Homesteads	106.89	172.02	US 127 (SR 28) – Crossville, Jamestown, Pikeville, Cumberland Mountain State Park	Northern terminus
1.000 mi = 1.609 km; 1.000 km = 0.621 mi: Concurrency terminus
