= Tennessee State Route 303 =

State highway in Tennessee, United States

State Route 303
- Cranmore Cove Road
- SR 303 highlighted in red

Route information
- Maintained by TDOT
- Length: 5.7 mi (9.2 km)
- Existed: July 1, 1983–present

Major junctions
- South end: US 27 in Graysville
- North end: SR 30 just west of Dayton

Location
- Country: United States
- State: Tennessee
- Counties: Rhea

Highway system
- Tennessee State Routes; Interstate; US; State
← SR 302	→ SR 304

State Route 303 (SR 303) is a short 5.7-mile-long (9.2 km) state highway in Rhea County, Tennessee. For the majority of its length, it is known as Cranmore Cove Road.

== Route description ==
SR 303 begins in Graysville at an intersection with US 27/SR 29. It goes north through downtown as Dayton Avenue before turning onto Cranmore Cove Road. The highway then goes northeast through a narrow valley between two ridges before coming to an end at an intersection with SR 30 just west of Dayton. The entire route of SR 303 is a two-lane highway.

== Major intersections ==
The entire route is in Rhea County.

Location	mi	km	Destinations	Notes
Graysville	0.0	0.0	US 27 (Rhea County Highway/SR 29) – Chattanooga, Soddy-Daisy, Dayton	Southern terminus
	5.7	9.2	SR 30 (Dayton Mountain Highway) – Pikeville, Dayton	Northern terminus
1.000 mi = 1.609 km; 1.000 km = 0.621 mi
