= Cardiff, Tennessee =

Company town in Tennessee, United States

Coordinates: 35°53′26″N 84°37′52″W

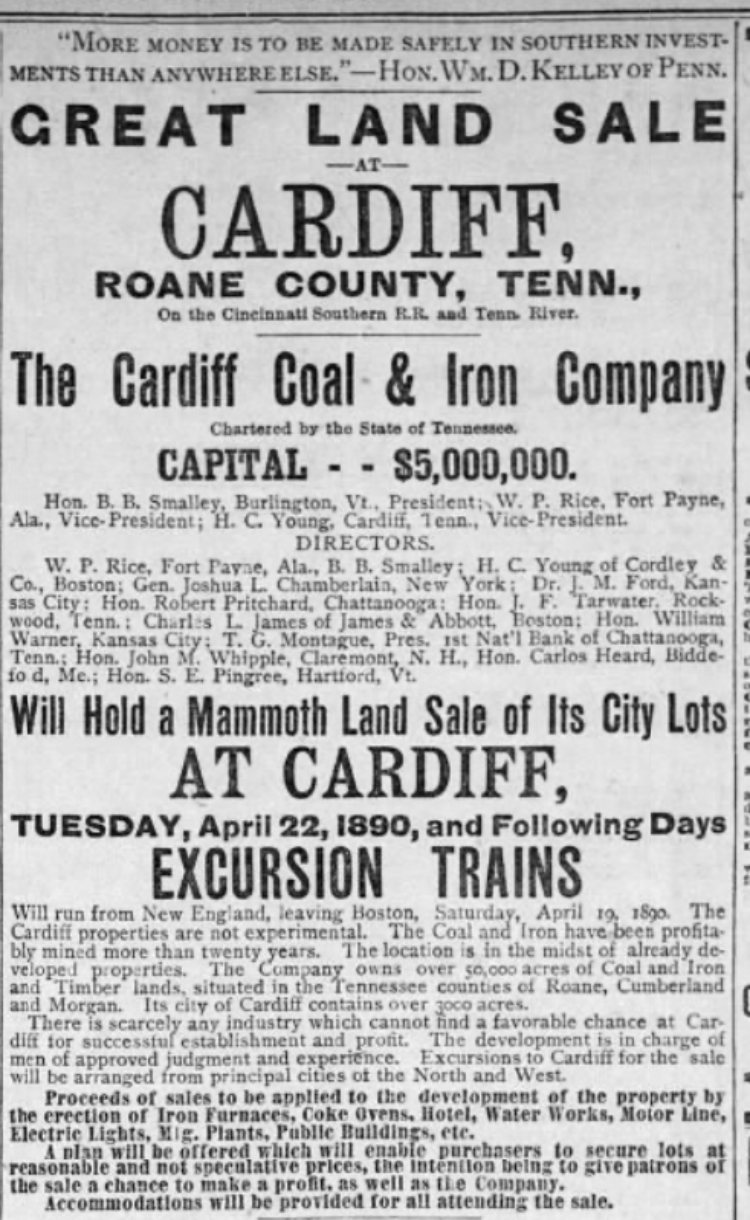
Cardiff Iron and Coal Co. Advertisement, Boston Globe 1890:

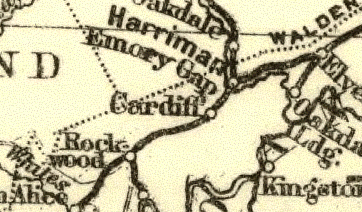
Cardiff, as it appeared on an 1892 railroad map

Cardiff was a company town located in Roane County, Tennessee, United States. Established in the early 1890s by New England investors, the town was to house workers and managers for a large-scale mining operation that sought to utilize the abundant iron ore and coal resources along nearby Walden Ridge. The town was named for Cardiff, Wales, as its planners believed it would someday rival the Welsh city as a mining mecca. The town's development was thwarted, however, when the Panic of 1893 left its parent company in financial ruin. Little remains of the town today.

The iron and coal resources of Roane County's Walden Ridge area were well known by the late 1880s. In 1889, Maine businessman W. P. Rice and several associates travelled to Roane County to investigate the area's industrial potential, and were impressed enough to make arrangements to acquire large amounts of land in the area. In March of the following year, the Cardiff Coal and Iron Company was incorporated with plans to build an iron furnace, coking ovens, rolling mills, and a large company town in Roane County. The company's officers included former Maine governor Joshua Chamberlain, former Vermont governor Samuel Pingree, and several Knoxville businessmen. To finance the venture, the company borrowed several million dollars with which it purchased 50,000 acres (20,000 ha) of land in central Roane County, just north of Rockwood, with plans to finance the iron works with sales from land lots in the company town. An auction for the lots, held at Cardiff in April 1890, was attended by over 4,000 prospective buyers from around the country, and raised over $1 million.

Cardiff was designed in a manner that was fashionable for late 19th-century planned cities, which stressed health, sanitation, and temperance. The main town lots were laid out in a grid plan, with a "detached" residential section where the grid layout was abandoned and the design instead followed natural topographical features. Streets running east-to-west were named for various U.S. states, while streets running north-to-south were named for various North American and European cities. The town was bisected by railroad tracks, with major industrial lots on the south side of the tracks, and a hotel and depot near the center of town.

While the land auction in Cardiff had been successful, the company had demanded only one-third of the total payment for each sale upfront, with the rest to be paid at a later date. In the months following the auction, financial markets began to freeze in the wake of the Barings Bank collapse in London, and many of the Cardiff buyers, concerned about their own assets, began defaulting on their lot purchases. Unable to repay its debtors, Cardiff Coal and Iron was placed in receivership in June 1891, and was forced into bankruptcy in the wake of the financial panic of 1893. Within a few years, the town of Cardiff had been mostly abandoned. Its territory now mostly lies within the city limits of Rockwood.
