= Isham, Tennessee =

- Unincorporated community
- Location within Tennessee Location within the United States
- Coordinates: 36°35′41″N 84°26′20″W
- Country: United States
- State: Tennessee
- County: Scott
- Elevation: 1,355 ft (413 m)
- Time zone: UTC-5 (Eastern (EST))
  - Summer (DST): UTC-4 (EDT)
- Area code: 423
- GNIS feature ID: 1289076

Isham is an unincorporated community in Scott County, Tennessee, United States.
