= Watts Bar Dam =

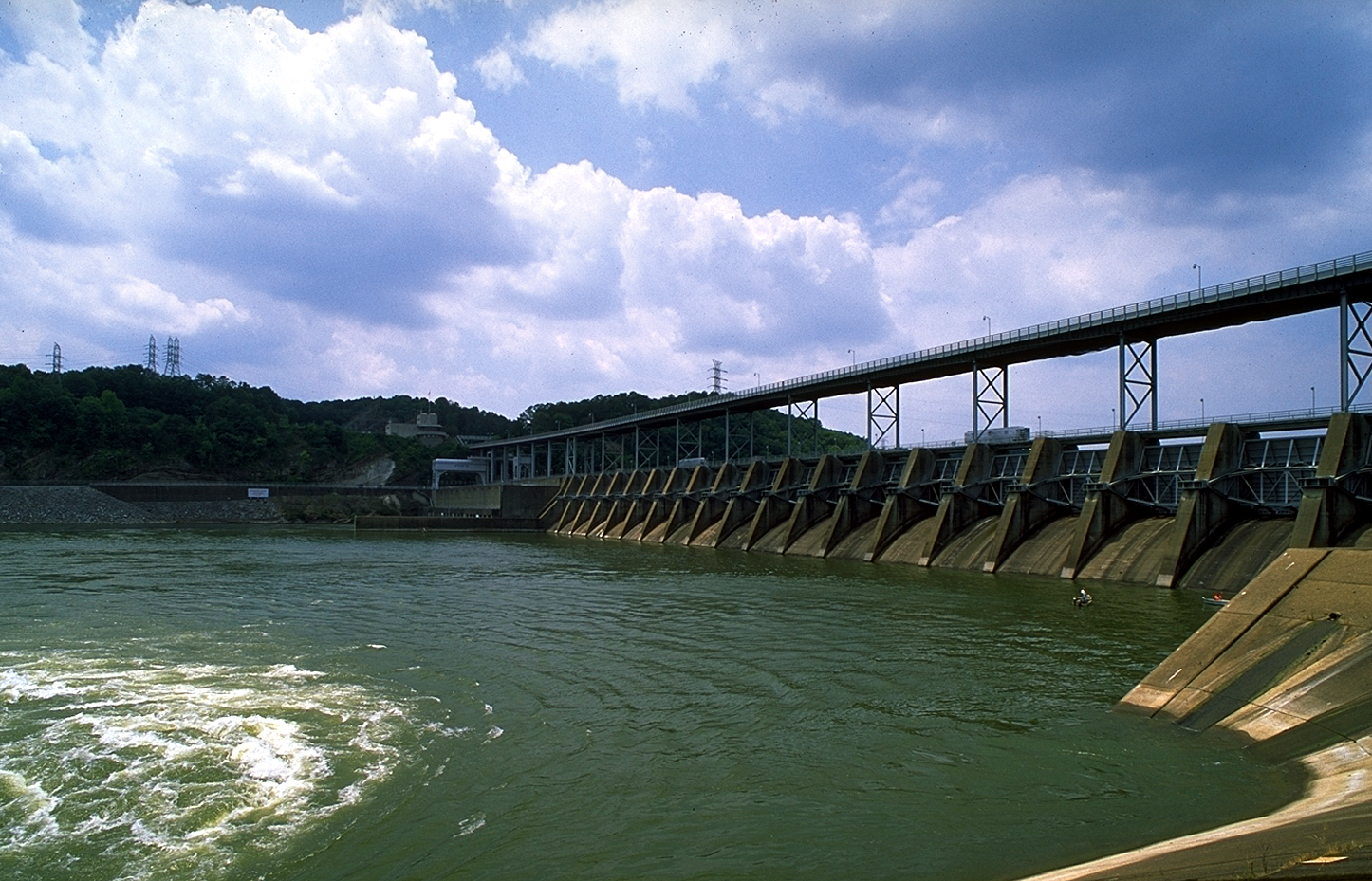
- Watts Bar Dam

- Location within Tennessee
- Official name: Watts Bar Dam
- Location: Meigs County and Rhea County, Tennessee, U.S.
- Coordinates: 35°37′16.69″N 84°46′53.75″W
- Construction began: July 1, 1939
- Opening date: January 1, 1942
- Operator: Tennessee Valley Authority

Dam and spillways
- Impounds: Tennessee River
- Height: 112 ft (34 m)
- Length: 2,960 ft (900 m)

Reservoir
- Creates: Watts Bar Lake
- Total capacity: 1,175,000 acre⋅ft (1,449,000 dam^{3})
- Catchment area: 17,310 mi^{2} (44,800 km^{2})

Power Station
- Commission date: 1941-1944
- Turbines: 5 x 38 MW Kaplan-type
- Installed capacity: 190 MW

Watts Bar Dam is a hydroelectric dam on the Tennessee River in Meigs and Rhea counties in Tennessee, United States. The dam is one of nine dams on the main Tennessee River channel operated by the Tennessee Valley Authority, which built the dam in the early 1940s to provide flood control and electricity and to help create a continuous navigable channel along the entire length of the river. The dam is the technical boundary between the 39,090-acre (15,820 ha) Watts Bar Lake— which it impounds— and 36,240-acre (14,670 ha) Chickamauga Lake, which stretches from the dam's tailwaters southward to Chattanooga.

Watts Bar Dam is named for Watt Island, a sandbar located at the dam site prior to the dam's construction.

== Location ==
Watts Bar Dam is located approximately 530 miles (850 km) upstream from the mouth of the Tennessee River, roughly halfway between Knoxville and Chattanooga. Just north of the dam, the Tennessee absorbs the Piney River, which flows down from the Cumberland Plateau to the west. The nearest towns of note are Spring City (a few miles to the northwest) and Decatur (a few miles to the south). Tennessee State Route 68 crosses Watts Bar Dam, connecting the area with Interstate 75 to the east and U.S. Route 27 to the west.

== Capacity ==
Watts Bar Lake extends 72.4 miles (116.5 km) northeast from the dam to Fort Loudoun Dam, and includes parts of Meigs, Rhea, Roane, and Loudon counties. In addition to its main Tennessee River channel, Watts Bar Lake is navigable across the lower 23 miles (37 km) of the Clinch River (up to Melton Hill Dam) and the lower 12 miles (19 km) of the Emory River. The cities of Kingston, Spring City, Harriman, Loudon, Rockwood, and Lenoir City all have waterfronts on Watts Bar Lake.

Watts Bar provides 722 miles (1,162 km) of shoreline and over 39,090 acres (15,820 ha) of water surface. Watts Bar Dam is 112 feet (34 m) high and stretches 2,960 feet (900 m) across the Tennessee River. Watts Bar has a storage capacity of 1,175,000 acre⋅ft (1,449,000 dam^{3}), a flood-storage capacity of 379,000 acre⋅ft (467,000 dam^{3}), and generates 175 megawatts of electricity. The dam's navigational lock is 360 by 60 feet (110 m × 18 m), and raises and lowers vessels 70 feet (21 m) from Watts Bar Lake to Chickamauga Lake and vice versa.

== Background and construction ==
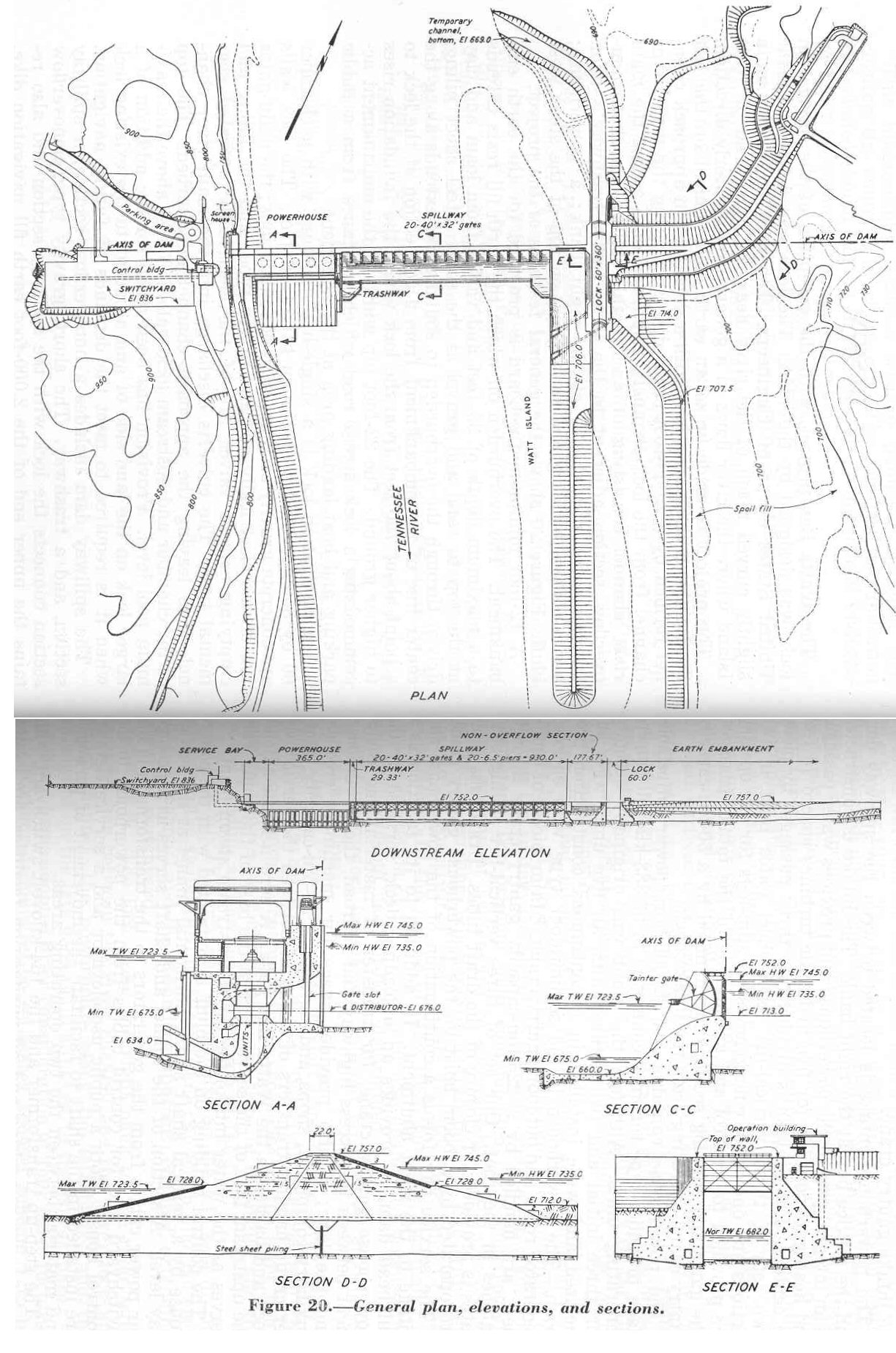
TVA's design plan for Watts Bar Dam, circa 1939

Watt Island's potential as a dam site had been recognized since the early 1870s, when the U.S. Army Corps of Engineers built a dike at the tip of the island to improve flow in the main river channel. The Corps carried out dredging work at the island between 1911 and 1913 that deepened the main channel, and recommended the site (originally known as the "White Creek site" after a stream that joins the Tennessee a few miles upriver) for a dam in 1930. In 1936, the Tennessee Valley Authority assumed direction of the site as part of its unified strategy to build (and acquire) a series of dams along the Tennessee River to improve navigation and flood control, and aide in the region's economic development. TVA was given authorization to build a dam at Watt Island on March 16, 1939, and construction on Watts Bar Dam began on July 1, 1939.

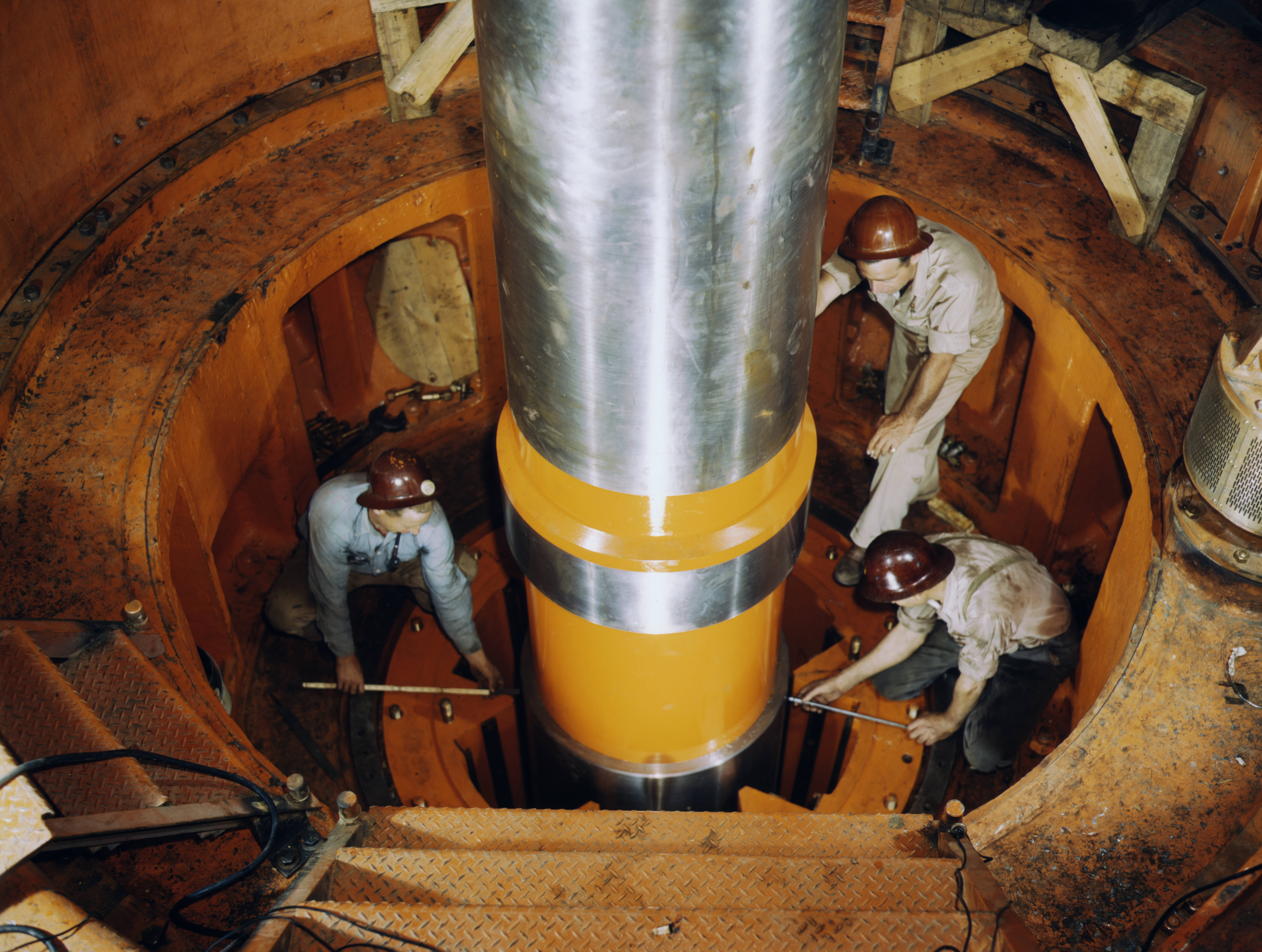
Workers test a turbine shaft at Watts Bar, June 1942

The construction of Watts Bar Dam and its accompanying reservoir required the purchase of 54,600 acres (22,100 ha) of land and flowage rights, 7,304 acres (2,956 ha) of which were forested and had to be cleared. 832 families, 17 cemeteries, and 121 miles (195 km) of roads were relocated. An earthen dike was built to protect downtown Kingston from the reservoir's backwaters, and minor adjustments were necessary to the riverfronts of Spring City, Harriman, Wheat, and Loudon. The community of Rhea Springs, located along the Piney River a few miles upstream from the river's mouth, was completely inundated.

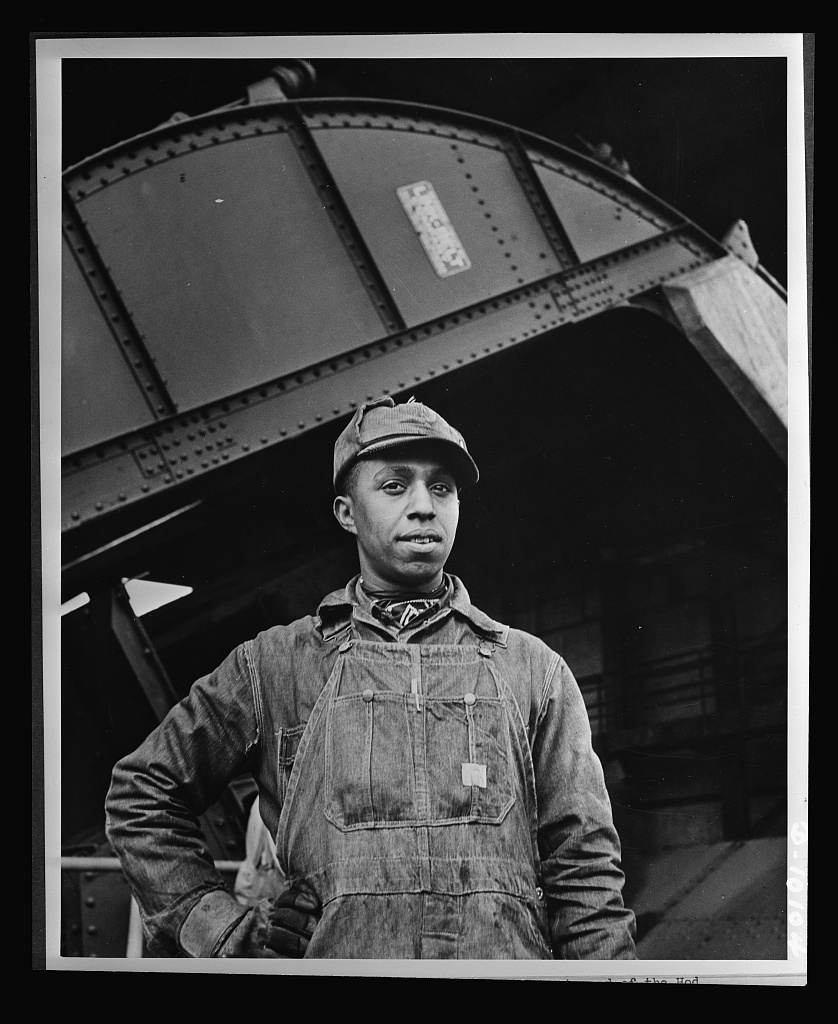
Earl M. Qualls, car dumper operator at Watts Bar, in June 1942. This image was distributed by the Office of War information to demonstrate the importance of the dam's electricity as well as the contribution of African-Americans to the war effort.

The dam's original design called for the installation of three generators, but with the outbreak of World War II in 1941, energy demand in the region skyrocketed, and the design was modified to include a fourth and fifth generator. The dam was completed and the gates closed on January 1, 1942. The first generator went online February 11 of that year, followed by the second generator on April 6 and the third on July 23. The fourth generator went online March 12, 1944 and the fifth followed on April 24, 1944. The Army Corps of Engineers designed the dam's lock, which went into operation on February 16, 1942.

Watts Bar Lake was one of the water bodies affected by a massive release of fly ash in 2008 from the Kingston Fossil Plant coal fly ash slurry spill.

== See also ==
- Dams and reservoirs of the Tennessee River
- List of crossings of the Tennessee River
- Watts Bar Nuclear Generating Station
