= Midtown, Tennessee =

- Census-designated place
- Location of Midtown, Tennessee
- Coordinates: 35°52′55″N 84°33′53″W
- Country: United States
- State: Tennessee
- County: Roane

Area
  - Total: 4.49 sq mi (11.64 km^{2})
  - Land: 4.49 sq mi (11.63 km^{2})
  - Water: 0.0039 sq mi (0.01 km^{2})
- Elevation: 827 ft (252 m)

Population (2020)
  - Total: 1,220
  - Density: 271.8/sq mi (104.94/km^{2})
- Time zone: UTC-5 (Eastern (EST))
  - Summer (DST): UTC-4 (EDT)
- ZIP code: 37748
- Area code: 865
- FIPS code: 47-48460
- GNIS feature ID: 1293720

Midtown is a census-designated place (CDP) in Roane County, Tennessee, United States. Its population was 1,360 as of the 2010 census. Twice in the 1990s residents voted to incorporate as a town, and for a time the community maintained a municipal government, but the incorporation was challenged in court and eventually overturned after the state statute under which Midtown incorporated was ruled unconstitutional. It was a city at the time of the 2000 census, when the population was 1,306. It is included in the Knoxville Metropolitan Area.

== Geography ==
According to the United States Census Bureau, the city had a total area of 4.6 square miles (12 km^{2}), all of it land.

== Demographics ==
Historical population
Census	Pop.	Note	%±
2000	1,306		—
2010	1,360		4.1%
2020	1,220		−10.3%
U.S. Decennial Census

As of the census of 2000, there were 1,306 people, 561 households, and 368 families residing in the city. The population density was 277.3 inhabitants per square mile (107.1/km^{2}). There were 626 housing units at an average density of 132.9 per square mile (51.3/km^{2}). The racial makeup of the city was 94.10% White, 3.29% African American, 0.54% Native American, 0.08% Asian, 0.54% from other races, and 1.45% from two or more races. Hispanic or Latino of any race were 0.54% of the population.

There were 561 households, out of which 28.5% had children under the age of 18 living with them, 48.8% were married couples living together, 13.0% had a female householder with no husband present, and 34.4% were non-families. 29.8% of all households were made up of individuals, and 12.8% had someone living alone who was 65 years of age or older. The average household size was 2.33 and the average family size was 2.84.

In the city the population was spread out, with 23.0% under the age of 18, 8.9% from 18 to 24, 29.9% from 25 to 44, 23.9% from 45 to 64, and 14.3% who were 65 years of age or older. The median age was 37 years. For every 100 females, there were 92.3 males. For every 100 females age 18 and over, there were 92.4 males.

The median income for a household in the city was $23,409, and the median income for a family was $26,917. Males had a median income of $21,765 versus $16,823 for females. The per capita income for the city was $15,678. About 18.6% of families and 21.9% of the population were below the poverty line, including 33.7% of those under age 18 and 8.0% of those age 65 or over.
