= Old Washington, Tennessee =

Unincorporated community in Tennessee, US

Coordinates: 35°32′04″N 84°54′26″W

Old Washington (formerly Washington) is an unincorporated community and a former county seat of Rhea County, Tennessee.

== History ==
After considering several options, a site at the head of Spring Creek was selected in 1812 to be the county seat of Rhea County. This site was established as the town of Washington. The land for the town was donated by David Campbell, and the lots were auctioned off from May 21–22, 1812. A brick courthouse was completed in 1832. The town was a busy marketplace, with ten stores and its own newspaper, The Valley Freeman. During the Civil War, the courthouse was used as a headquarters by various officers in 1863. The Cincinnati Southern Railway, constructed in 1880, passed through Dayton but bypassed Washington, and the inhabitants of Rhea County voted in 1889 to move the county seat from Washington to Dayton. Washington's population declined; the courthouse was torn down, and its bricks were used to build the courthouse in Dayton. The Washington Ferry operated on the Tennessee River between Old Washington and Meigs County from 1807 until the construction of the Highway 30 bridge in the 1990s.

== Education ==
Rhea County Schools is the local school district. The district's sole high school is Rhea County High School.
