= Five Points, Rhea County, Tennessee =

Five Points, Tennessee
- Unincorporated community
- Location within Tennessee Location within the United States
- Coordinates: 35°26′41″N 85°01′03″W
- Country: United States
- State: Tennessee
- County: Rhea
- Elevation: 751 ft (229 m)
- Time zone: UTC-5 (Eastern (EST))
  - Summer (DST): UTC-4 (EDT)
- Area code: 423
- GNIS feature ID: 1315059

Five Points is an unincorporated community in Rhea County, Tennessee, United States. Five Points is located along Tennessee State Route 60 3.4 miles (5.5 km) south of Dayton.

== Education ==
Rhea County Schools is the local school district. The district's sole high school is Rhea County High School.
