= Grandview, Rhea County, Tennessee =

Grandview, Tennessee
- Unincorporated community
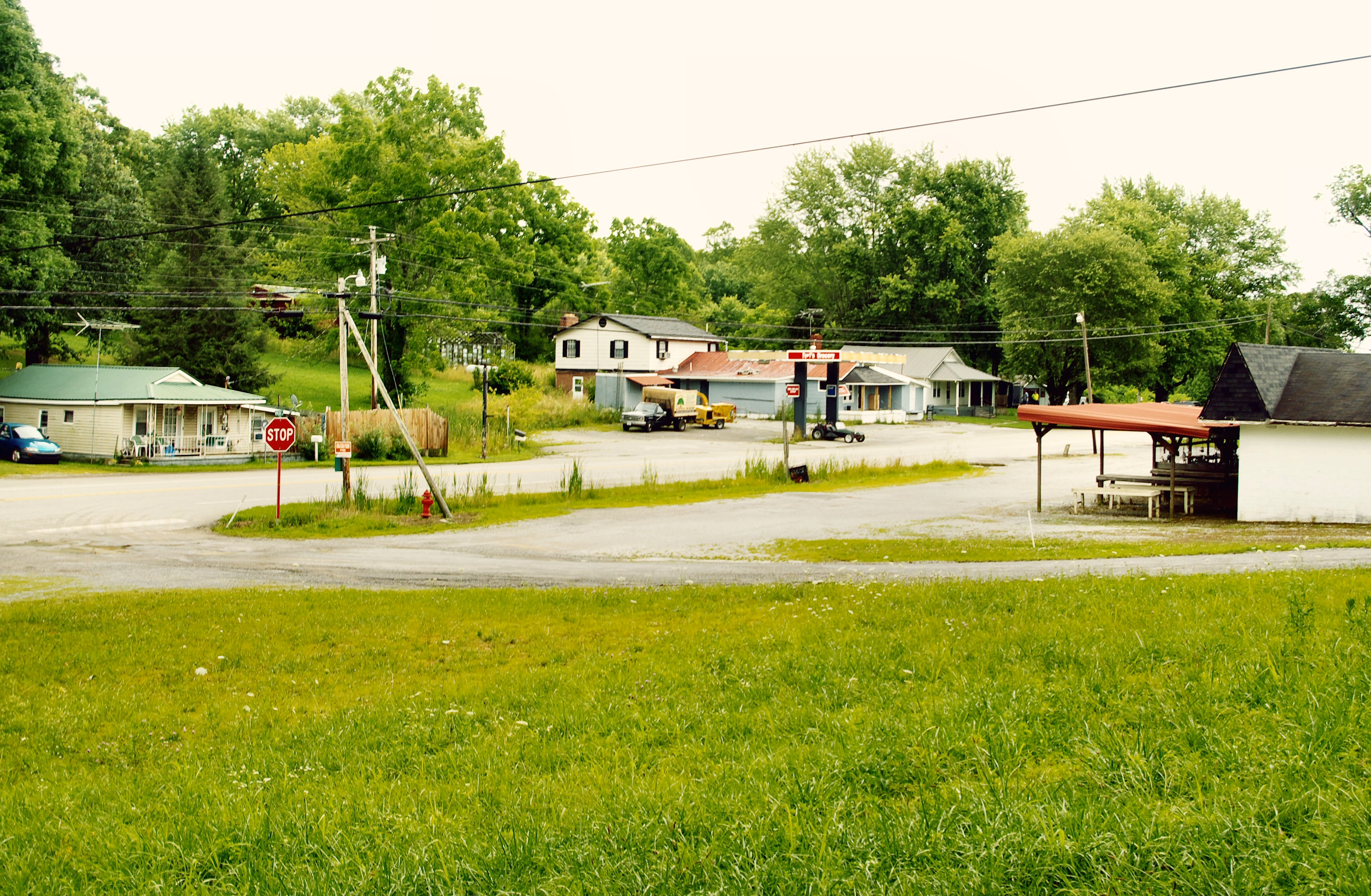

- Location within Tennessee Location within the United States
- Coordinates: 35°44′37″N 84°50′24″W
- Country: United States
- State: Tennessee
- County: Rhea
- Elevation: 1,460 ft (450 m)
- Time zone: UTC-5 (Eastern (EST))
  - Summer (DST): UTC-4 (EDT)
- ZIP code: 37337
- Area code: 423
- GNIS feature ID: 1285826

Grandview is an unincorporated community in Rhea County, Tennessee, United States. Grandview is located along Tennessee State Route 68 at the eastern edge of the Cumberland Plateau, 3.7 miles (6.0 km) north-northeast of Spring City. Grandview's ZIP code is 37337.

== Education ==
Rhea County Schools is the local school district. The district's sole high school is Rhea County High School.
