= Liberty Hill, Rhea County, Tennessee =

Liberty Hill, Tennessee
- Unincorporated community
- Location within Tennessee Location within the United States
- Coordinates: 35°35′55″N 85°02′07″W
- Country: United States
- State: Tennessee
- County: Rhea
- Elevation: 1,910 ft (580 m)
- Time zone: UTC-5 (Eastern (EST))
  - Summer (DST): UTC-4 (EDT)
- Area code: 423
- GNIS feature ID: 1315393

Liberty Hill is an unincorporated community in Rhea County, Tennessee, United States. Liberty Hill is 7.3 miles (11.7 km) north of Dayton.

== Education ==
Rhea County Schools is the local school district. The district's sole high school is Rhea County High School.
