= David Douglas (offensive lineman) =

American football player (1963–2016)

No. 67
- Positions: Center, tackle, guard

Personal information
- Born: March 20, 1963; Spring City, Tennessee, U.S.
- Died: February 27, 2016 (aged 52); Maryville, Tennessee, U.S.
- Listed height: 6 ft 4 in (1.93 m)
- Listed weight: 280 lb (127 kg)

Career information
- High school: Rhea County (Evensville, Tennessee)
- College: Tennessee
- NFL draft: 1986: 8th round, 204th overall pick

Career history
- Cincinnati Bengals (1986–1988); New England Patriots (1989–1990)

Career NFL statistics
- Games played: 56
- Games started: 10
- Stats at Pro Football Reference

David Glenn Douglas (March 20, 1963 – February 27, 2016) was an American professional football offensive lineman who played five seasons in the National Football League (NFL) with the Cincinnati Bengals and New England Patriots. He was selected by the Bengals in the eighth round of the 1986 NFL draft after playing college football at the University of Tennessee.

== Early life and college ==
David Glenn Douglas was born on March 20, 1963, in Spring City, Tennessee. He attended Rhea County High School in Evensville, Tennessee.

Douglas joined the Tennessee Volunteers as a walk-on in 1981 and earned a scholarship in 1982. He was a two-year starter at left tackle from 1984 to 1985.

== Professional career ==
Douglas was selected by the Cincinnati Bengals in the eighth round, with the 204th overall pick, of the 1986 NFL draft. He officially signed with the team on July 10. He played in 14 games for the Bengals during his rookie year in 1986. He played in 12 games, starting four, during the 1987 season. Douglas appeared in 14 games in 1988. He also played in thee playoff games that year, including the loss to the San Francisco 49ers in Super Bowl XXIII. He became a free agent after the season.

Douglas signed with the New England Patriots on March 18, 1989. He was released on September 5 but re-signed on September 13, 1989. He appeared in five games, starting one, for the Patriots during the 1989 season. He was released again on September 3, 1990, re-signed on September 4, placed on injured reserve on October 25, released on November 9, and re-signed on November 14. Overall, Douglas played in 11 games, starting five, in 1990. He became a free agent after the season.

== Personal life ==
Douglas married Karla Horton, a former Tennessee Volunteers basketball player. Their son Aaron, also played football for the Tennessee Volunteers, and died in 2009 after overdosing on methadone pills.

Douglas was diagnosed with brain cancer in 2013. He died from the illness on February 27, 2016, in Maryville, Tennessee at the age of 52.
