= Andy Kelly (American football) =

American football player (born 1968)

No. 8
- Position: Quarterback

Personal information
- Born: June 6, 1968 (age 58); Dayton, Tennessee, U.S.
- Listed height: 6 ft 3 in (1.91 m)
- Listed weight: 220 lb (100 kg)

Career information
- High school: Rhea County (Evensville, Tennessee)
- College: Tennessee
- NFL draft: 1992: undrafted

Career history
- Charlotte Rage (1993–1996); Pittsburgh Steelers (1994)*; Chicago Bears (1995–96); Nashville Kats (1997–2001); Dallas Desperados (2002); Detroit Fury (2003–2004); New Orleans VooDoo (2005); Kansas City Brigade (2006); Utah Blaze (2006); New Orleans VooDoo (2007); Georgia Force (2008)
- * Offseason or practice squad member only

Awards and highlights
- 2× Second-team All-SEC (1990, 1991)

Career AFL statistics
- Pass attempts-completions: 6,224–3,886
- Percentage: 62.4
- TD–INT: 809–164
- Passing yards: 42,519
- Passer rating: 104.09
- Stats at ArenaFan.com

Andy Kelly (born June 6, 1968) is an American former professional football quarterback in the Arena Football League (AFL). He played in the AFL for fifteen seasons for a total of eight different teams. He also played for two seasons for the Rhein Fire of the former World League of American Football (WLAF). He played college football at the University of Tennessee from 1988 to 1991.

== Early life ==
Kelly attended Rhea County High School in Evensville, Tennessee. As a member of the Golden Eagles high school football team, he won Gatorade All-America honors as a senior.

== College career ==
Kelly was a successful collegiate quarterback at the University of Tennessee from 1988–1991 under head coach Johnny Majors. He took over as a starter for Sterling Henton in the 1989 SEC rivalry game against the Alabama Crimson Tide. He became part of Tennessee football lore as part of team that accomplished a 35–34 victory at Notre Dame, later dubbed as "The Miracle at South Bend". The Vols trailed at one point 31–7 before Kelly helped instrument a comeback to beat the Fighting Irish. He set numerous Tennessee and SEC passing records, most of them broken by his later successor at Tennessee, Peyton Manning.

== Professional career ==
Kelly's predominant professional football career was as an Arena Football League quarterback, playing some of his career with the New Orleans VooDoo, for whom he played for in 2005 and 2007, and which was the last team for which he actively appeared as a player. He previously played for the Charlotte Rage (1993, 1995–96), Nashville Kats (1997–2001), Dallas Desperados (2002), Detroit Fury (2003–2004), Kansas City Brigade (2006), and Utah Blaze (2006). At the end of the 2006 season, he held several all-time AFL career records, including touchdown passes (767), passing yards (39,948), pass attempts (5,827), pass completions (3,621), and interceptions (155).

On Friday, April 27, 2007, in a 72–57 home loss to their division-mate, the Georgia Force, Kelly joined Aaron Garcia, Clint Dolezel, and Sherdrick Bonner as the only quarterbacks in professional football history to throw for over 800 career touchdowns.

On December 6, 2007, Kelly was named the head coach of the proposed new All American Football League's Tennessee team. However, the league suspended operations March 12, 2008 (permanently, as things later developed, although only a delay was announced at the time), and Kelly signed with the Georgia Force two weeks later on March 26, 2008, but never actually participated in any games as an active player for the Force. Kelly retired as an Arena Football player following the 2008 season and currently serves as a commentator on Tennessee Volunteers football radio broadcasts.

In June 2013, Kelly was nominated for the Arena Football Hall of Fame.

== Career statistics ==
=== AFL ===
| Year | Comp. | Att. | Comp% | Yards | TD's | INT's | Rating |
|---|---|---|---|---|---|---|---|
| 1993 | 178 | 332 | 53.6 | 2,139 | 34 | 15 | 80.3 |
| 1995 | 95 | 166 | 57.2 | 1,004 | 16 | 8 | 78.9 |
| 1996 | 58 | 94 | 61.7 | 671 | 8 | 1 | 100 |
| 1997 | 309 | 497 | 62.2 | 3,821 | 82 | 14 | 113.7 |
| 1998 | 315 | 518 | 60.8 | 3,537 | 73 | 12 | 106.7 |
| 1999 | 324 | 501 | 64.7 | 3,609 | 67 | 11 | 110.2 |
| 2000 | 283 | 429 | 66 | 3,107 | 55 | 10 | 109.5 |
| 2001 | 230 | 382 | 60.2 | 2,699 | 47 | 7 | 104.8 |
| 2002 | 319 | 511 | 62.4 | 3,295 | 73 | 16 | 105.4 |
| 2003 | 392 | 654 | 59.9 | 3,967 | 92 | 20 | 99.7 |
| 2004 | 360 | 587 | 61.3 | 4,184 | 73 | 12 | 105.4 |
| 2005 | 466 | 700 | 66.6 | 4,657 | 96 | 12 | 112.4 |
| 2006 (Utah) | 115 | 162 | 71 | 1,402 | 27 | 4 | 126.5 |
| 2006 (Kansas City) | 177 | 294 | 60.2 | 1,856 | 24 | 13 | 80.5 |
| 2007 | 265 | 397 | 66.8 | 2,571 | 42 | 9 | 101.7 |
| Career | 3,886 | 6,224 | 62.4 | 42,519 | 809 | 164 | 104 |

=== College ===
Tennessee Volunteers
| Season | Passing | | | | | | | Rushing | | | |
| Season | Cmp | Att | Yds | Pct | TD | Int | Rtg | Att | Yds | Avg | TD |
|---|---|---|---|---|---|---|---|---|---|---|---|
| 1988 | 15 | 25 | 98 | 60.0 | 0 | 0 | 92.9 | 9 | −15 | −1.7 | 0 |
| 1989 | 92 | 156 | 1,299 | 59.0 | 7 | 9 | 132.2 | 32 | −33 | −1.0 | 0 |
| 1990 | 179 | 304 | 2,241 | 58.9 | 14 | 14 | 126.8 | 38 | 18 | 0.5 | 0 |
| 1991 | 228 | 361 | 2,759 | 63.2 | 15 | 15 | 132.8 | 57 | 60 | 1.1 | 3 |
| Career | 514 | 846 | 6,397 | 60.8 | 36 | 38 | 129.3 | 136 | 30 | 0.2 | 3 |

== Personal life ==
After his professional football career, Kelly became a full-time insurance agent for State Farm.
