= Rhea County Courthouse =

Historic courthouse in Tennessee, US

- U.S. National Register of Historic Places
- U.S. National Historic Landmark
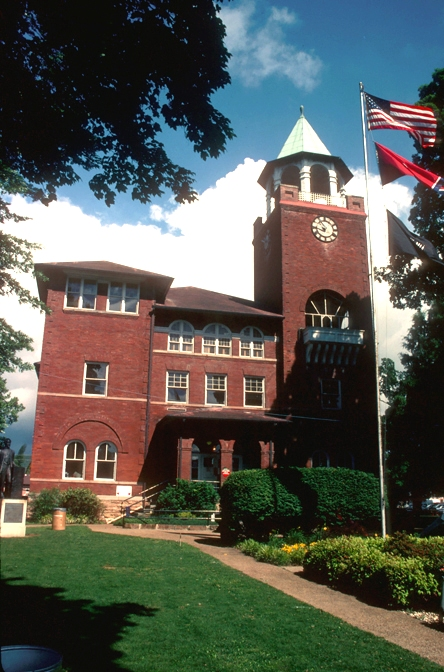
- The Rhea County Courthouse

- Location within Tennessee Location within the United States
- Interactive map showing the location of Rhea County Courthouse
- Location: 1475 Market Street; Dayton, Tennessee
- Coordinates: 35°29′41.74″N 85°00′45.63″W
- Area: 3.7 acres (1.5 ha)
- Built: 1891
- Architect: W. Chamberlin; Dowling & Taylor
- Architectural style: Italian villa Romanesque
- NRHP reference No.: 72001251

Significant dates
- Added to NRHP: November 7, 1972
- Designated NHL: December 8, 1976

The Rhea County Courthouse is a historic county courthouse in the center of Dayton, the county seat of Rhea County, Tennessee. Built in 1891, it is famous as the scene of the Scopes trial of July 1925, in which teacher John T. Scopes faced charges for including Charles Darwin's theory of evolution in his public school lesson. The trial became a clash of titans between lawyers William Jennings Bryan for the prosecution and Clarence Darrow for the defense, and epitomizes the tension between fundamentalism and modernism in a wide range of aspects of American society. The courthouse, now also housing a museum devoted to the trial, was designated a National Historic Landmark in 1976.

== Description ==
The Rhea County Courthouse stands prominently in the center of Dayton, on the courthouse square bounded by 2nd and 3rd Avenues, Market Street, and Court Street. It is a three-story brick building with Romanesque and Italianate features. It has a broad hip roof with a low hip-roofed tower at one corner of the main facade, and a taller square tower with an open octagonal belfry above a clock on the other. Some windows are set in round-arch openings. The building interior has many original features, including the main courtroom on the second floor, where the Scopes monkey trial took place.

== History ==
The building was constructed in 1890-91, after Dayton was named the county seat, replacing Washington. It was designed by W. Chamberlain and Co., architects from Knoxville, Tennessee, and was built by contractors from Chattanooga.

In July 1925, the courthouse was the scene of one of the mostly widely reported trials of the 1920s, the Scopes trial. Essentially cooked up as a publicity stunt by locals after passage of the state's Butler Act banned the teaching of biological evolution in public schools, science teacher John T. Scopes was arrested and charged with violating the act. The state was represented by renowned orator and fundamentalist Christian icon William Jennings Bryan, and Scopes was defended by an ACLU-funded team headed by noted criminal defense lawyer Clarence Darrow. Although Scopes was convicted in a highly sensationalized trial, the culture clash between legal principles, as well as fundamentalism and modernism left an enduring mark on American society. The defense called Bryan to the stand to defend fundamentalism, and successfully exposed the underlying ignorance of his views. In subsequent years, many states that had enacted similar laws repealed them.

== Rhea County Museum ==
A $1-million project which restored the second-floor courtroom to the way it looked during the Scopes trial was completed in 1979. The Rhea County Museum, also called the Scopes Trial Museum, is located in the courthouse basement and contains such memorabilia as the microphone used to broadcast the trial, trial records, photographs, and an audiovisual history of the trial. Every July local people re-enact key moments of the trial in the courtroom. In front of the courthouse stands a commemorative plaque erected by the Tennessee Historical Commission:

2B 23
THE SCOPES TRIAL

Here, from July 10 to 21, 1925, John
Thomas Scopes, a county high school
teacher, was tried for teaching that
a man descended from a lower order
of animals in violation of a lately
passed state law. William Jennings
Bryan assisted the prosecution;
Clarence Darrow, Arthur Garfield
Hays, and Dudley Field Malone the
defense. Scopes was convicted.

The Rhea County Courthouse was designated a National Historic Landmark by the National Park Service in 1976. It was placed on the National Register of Historic Places in 1972.

On October 1, 2005, a statue of William Jennings Bryan was dedicated on the courthouse lawn, funded by a donation from nearby Bryan College. The statue was placed to commemorate the school's 75th anniversary.

On July 14, 2017, a statue of Clarence Darrow was unveiled near Bryan's statue, funded by a donation from the Freedom From Religion Foundation.

== See also ==
- List of National Historic Landmarks in Tennessee
- National Register of Historic Places listings in Rhea County, Tennessee
