= Gooch Creek Arch =

Natural sandstone arch in Rhea County, Tennessee

Coordinates: 35.54796°N 85.00798°W

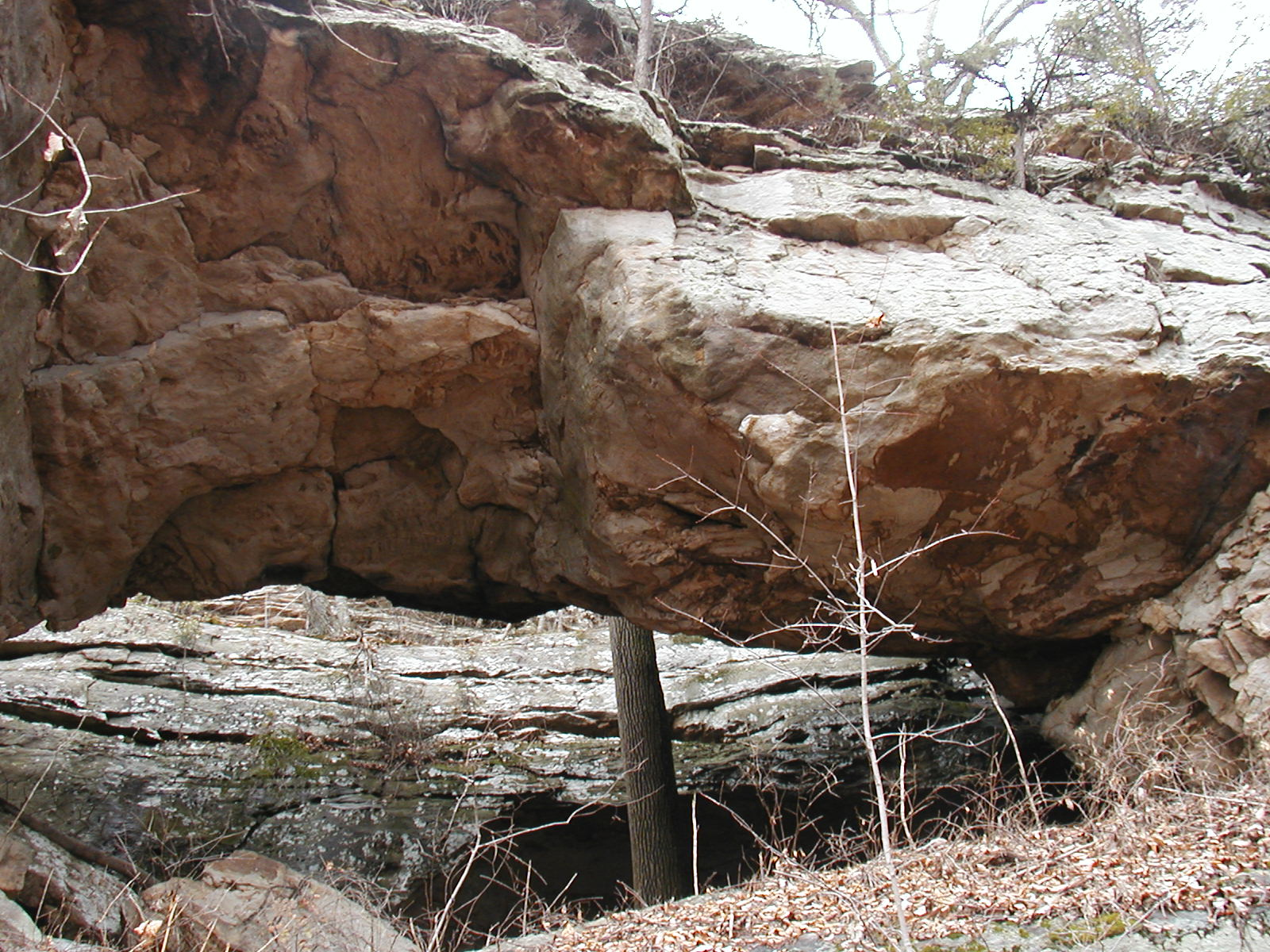
Gooch Creek Arch

Gooch Creek Arch is a natural sandstone arch in Rhea County, Tennessee. It is 45 feet (14 m) high with a span of 78 feet (24 m), making it one of the largest arches in Tennessee. While the arch was first described by Wilbur Nelson in 1915, it could not be located by Corgan and Parks in 1979.

The landform is near the Laurel-Snow State Natural Area and the Cumberland Trail.
