= Stinging Fork Falls State Natural Area =

Protected area in Tennessee, US

- Location within Tennessee
- Location: Rhea County, Tennessee
- Nearest city: Spring City
- Coordinates: 35°42′46″N 84°55′43″W
- Area: 783 acres (3.17 km^{2})
- Established: 1973
- Website: www.state.tn.us/environment/na/natareas/stinging/

Stinging Fork Falls State Natural Area, a Tennessee Class II Natural-Scientific State Scenic Area, is located in Rhea County, Tennessee, near Spring City.

The Stinging Fork Falls trail terminates at the bottom of Stinging Fork Falls, a 30-foot (9.1 m) high waterfall, about 1 mile from the parking area. A future segment of the Cumberland Trail is planned to connect to the falls.

The 783-acre (3.17 km^{2}) area is owned by the State of Tennessee and managed by the Tennessee Department of Environment and Conservation. It was formerly owned and managed by Bowater Paper Company, which designated several areas in Tennessee as "Pocket Wildernesses" for public recreation.
