= Josh Walker (American football) =

American football player (born 1991)

No. 79, 73
- Position: Guard

Personal information
- Born: June 2, 1991 (age 35); Knoxville, Tennessee, U.S.
- Listed height: 6 ft 6 in (1.98 m)
- Listed weight: 330 lb (150 kg)

Career information
- High school: Rhea County (Evensville, Tennessee)
- College: Middle Tennessee State
- NFL draft: 2014: undrafted

Career history
- Indianapolis Colts (2014)*; Green Bay Packers (2014–2015); Houston Texans (2016); Jacksonville Jaguars (2017–2018)
- * Offseason or practice squad member only

Awards and highlights
- Second-team All-C-USA (2013)

Career NFL statistics
- Games played: 22
- Games started: 4
- Stats at Pro Football Reference

Joshua Kyle Walker (born June 2, 1991) is an American former professional football player who was a guard in the National Football League (NFL). He played college football for the Middle Tennessee Blue Raiders. Walker was signed by the Indianapolis Colts as an undrafted free agent in 2014. He also played for the Green Bay Packers, Houston Texans, and Jacksonville Jaguars.

== Professional career ==
Pre-draft measurables
Height	Weight	40-yard dash	10-yard split	20-yard split	20-yard shuttle	Three-cone drill	Vertical jump	Broad jump	Bench press
6 ft 6 in (1.98 m)	320 lb (145 kg)	5.19 s	1.85 s	3.01 s	4.77 s	8.01 s	27.5 in (0.70 m)	7 ft 9 in (2.36 m)	23 reps
All values are from Pro Day

=== Indianapolis Colts ===
After going undrafted in the 2014 NFL draft, Walker signed with the Indianapolis Colts on May 11, 2014. On August 30, 2014, he was waived. Walker was signed to the Colts' practice squad the following day. On September 16, 2014, he was released from the Colts' practice squad.

=== Green Bay Packers ===
On September 23, 2014, Walker was signed to the Green Bay Packers' practice squad, where he spent the rest of his rookie season. He was re-signed by the Packers after the season ended on January 20, 2015.

In his second season, Walker played in 13 games at right guard, right tackle, and on special teams.

On August 30, 2016, he was placed on injured reserve. Walker was released by the Packers on September 3, 2016.

=== Houston Texans ===
Walker was signed to the Houston Texans' practice squad on October 27, 2016. He was promoted to the active roster on November 8, 2016.

On September 2, 2017, Walker was waived by the Texans.

=== Jacksonville Jaguars ===
On September 8, 2017, Walker signed with the Jacksonville Jaguars.

Walker was named the starting left tackle in Week 6 of the 2018 season after entering the season as the third-string tackle following injuries to Cam Robinson and Josh Wells. He started four games (Weeks 6–10) before suffering foot and ankle injuries in Week 10. He missed the next four games before being placed on injured reserve on December 14, 2018.
