= Pocket wilderness =

Type of nature reserve in Tennessee

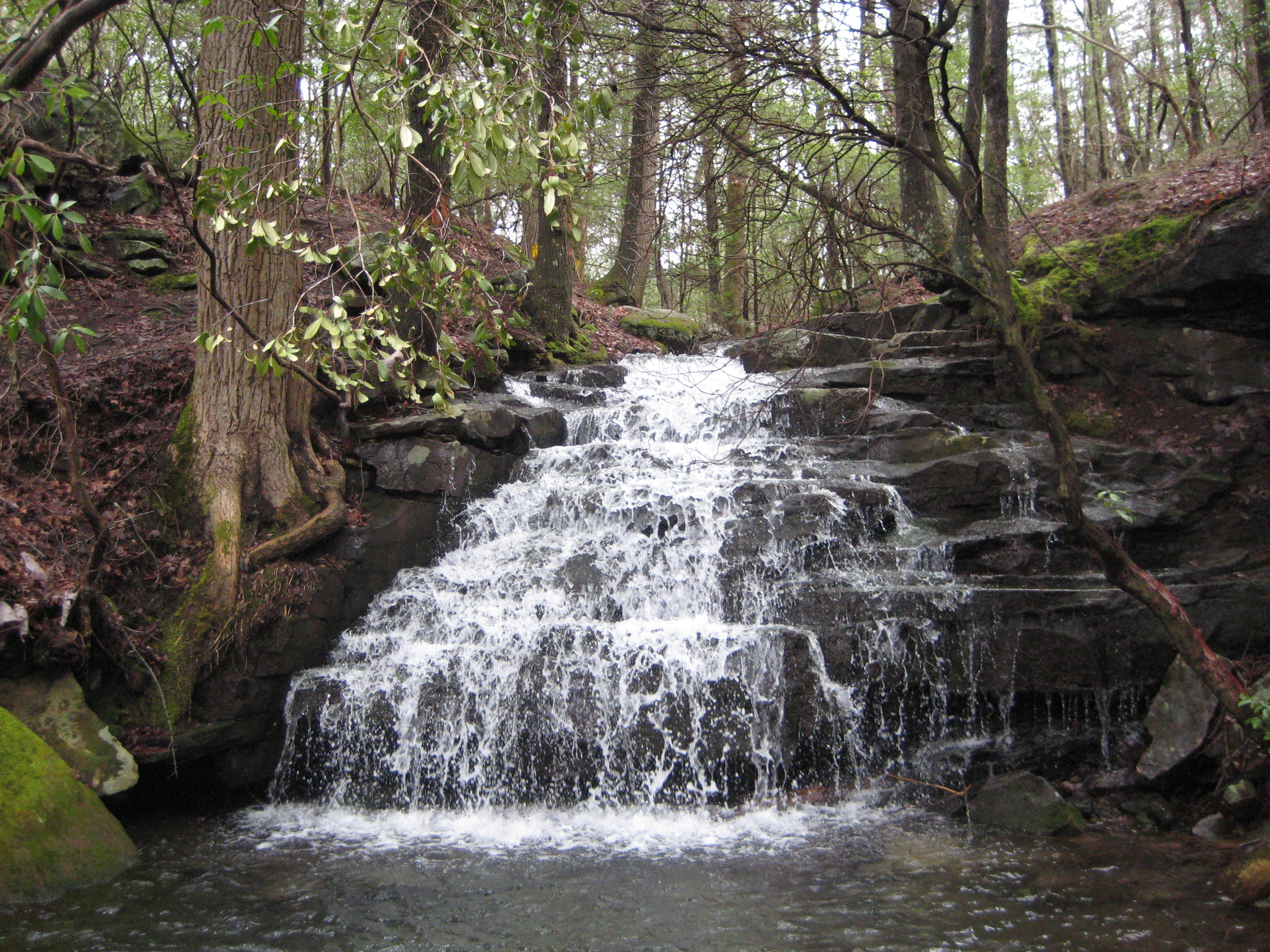
Big Branch Falls, Virgin Falls State Natural Area, an area of pocket wilderness

Pocket wilderness is a name used by Bowater corporation and the State of Tennessee for any of several tracts of Bowater-owned private land on and near the Cumberland Plateau that the company set aside beginning in 1970 "for preservation in its natural state, with no logging or development other than hiking trails permitted within its boundaries" and registered as Tennessee state natural areas. Several areas formerly managed as Bowater pocket wilderness are now incorporated into state-owned natural areas or National Park Service sites.

The Virgin Falls State Natural Area in White County was the first pocket wilderness established, originally consisting of 317 acres (1.28 km^{2}) along the Caney Fork and including Virgin Falls. This area was acquired by the state in 1996 and is now part of a 1,157-acre (4.68 km^{2}) state natural area.

Other Tennessee natural areas established as Bowater pocket wildernesses include:

- Bacon Ridge in Roane County
- Honey Creek State Natural Area in Scott County, 109 acres (0.44 km^{2}) within the boundaries of the Big South Fork National River and Recreation Area.
- Laurel-Snow State Natural Area on Walden Ridge in Rhea County, consisting of 710 acres (2.9 km^{2}) and featuring two waterfalls, Laurel Falls and Snow Falls.
- North Chickamauga Creek, originally about 1,100 acres (4.5 km^{2}). The Bowater Pocket Wilderness Area was transferred to the state in 2006 and became a part of the North Chickamauga Creek Gorge State Natural Area, which consists of 7,073 acres (28.62 km^{2}) in Hamilton and Sequatchie counties.
- Piney Falls State Natural Area in Rhea County on the east side of the Sequatchie Valley, a 187-acre (0.76 km^{2}) area including two waterfalls
- Stinging Fork Falls State Natural Area in Rhea County, consisting of 104 acres (0.42 km^{2}) and including the 30 ft (9.1 m) Stinging Fork Falls.

== See also ==
- Wilderness
