= Laurel-Snow State Natural Area =

State Natural Area in Rhea County, Tennessee

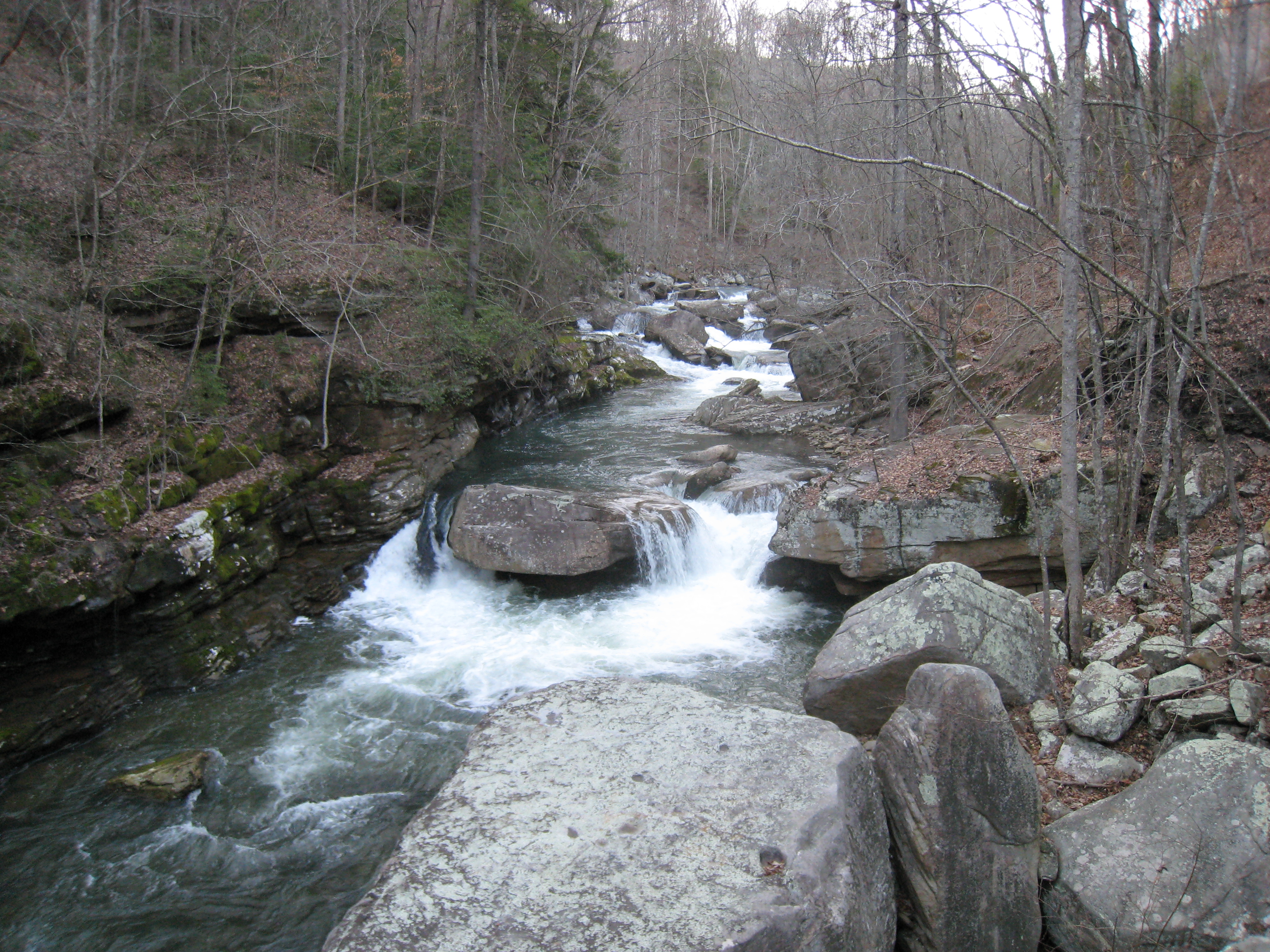
- Laurel-Snow State Natural Area

- Location within Tennessee
- Location: Rhea County, Tennessee
- Nearest city: Dayton
- Coordinates: 35°31′36″N 85°01′20″W
- Area: 2,259 acres (914 ha)
- Designated: 1973
- Website: www.tn.gov/content/tn/environment/program-areas/na-natural-areas/natural-areas-east-region/east-region-/na-na-laurel-snow.html

Laurel-Snow State Natural Area is a Tennessee Class II Natural-Scientific State Natural Area located in Rhea County, Tennessee, near Dayton, on Walden Ridge of the Cumberland Plateau. The 2,259-acre (9.14 km^{2}) area is owned by the State of Tennessee and managed by the Tennessee Department of Environment and Conservation. It is a component of the Cumberland Trail, a linear park.

The Laurel-Snow trail within the natural area was the first National Recreation Trail designated in Tennessee.

The Laurel-Snow State Natural Area got its name from two of the four waterfalls in the area, the 80-foot (24 m) Laurel Falls and the 12-foot (3.7 m) Snow Falls.

A 710-acre (2.9 km^{2}) portion of the area was formerly a Bowater pocket wilderness.

== See also ==
- Gooch Creek Arch – Natural sandstone arch in Rhea County, Tennessee
