= Rhea County, Tennessee =

County in Tennessee, United States

- County
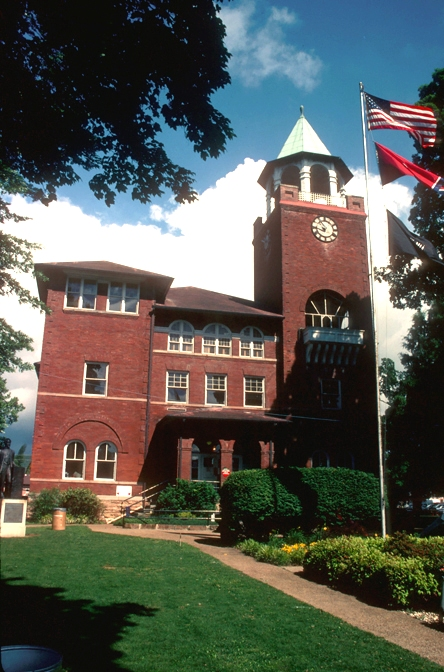
- The Rhea County Courthouse, site of the Scopes Trial

- Location within the U.S. state of Tennessee
- Coordinates: 35°37′N 84°55′W
- Country: United States
- State: Tennessee
- Founded: 1807
- Named for: John Rhea
- Seat: Dayton
- Largest city: Dayton

Area
  - Total: 336 sq mi (870 km^{2})
  - Land: 315 sq mi (820 km^{2})
  - Water: 21 sq mi (54 km^{2}) 6.3%

Population (2020)
  - Total: 32,870
  - Estimate (2025): 34,844 ▲
  - Density: 101/sq mi (39/km^{2})
- Time zone: UTC−5 (Eastern)
  - Summer (DST): UTC−4 (EDT)
- Area code: 423
- Congressional district: 4th
- Website: rheacountytn.org

Rhea County (/reɪ/ RAY) is a county located in the U.S. state of Tennessee. As of the 2020 census, its population was 32,870. Its county seat is Dayton. Rhea County comprises the Dayton, TN micropolitan statistical area, which is also included in the Chattanooga–Cleveland–Dalton, TN–GA–AL Combined Statistical Area.

== History ==
Rhea County is named for Tennessee politician and Revolutionary War veteran John Rhea. A portion of the Trail of Tears ran through the county as part of the United States government's removal of the Cherokee in the 1830s.

During the American Civil War, Rhea County was one of the few counties in East Tennessee that were heavily sympathetic to the cause of the Confederate States of America. It was the only East Tennessee county that did not send a delegate to the pro-Union East Tennessee Convention in 1861. The county voted in favor of Tennessee's June 1861 Ordinance of Secession, 360 votes to 202. Rhea raised seven companies for the Confederate Army, compared to just one company for the Union.

Rhea had the only female cavalry company on either side during the Civil War. It was made up of young women in their teens and their 20s from Rhea County and was formed in 1862. Their unit was named the Rhea County Spartans. Until 1863, the Spartans simply visited loved ones in the military and delivered the equivalent of modern-day care packages. After Union troops entered Rhea in 1863, the Spartans may have engaged in some spying for Confederate forces. The members of the Spartans were arrested in April 1865 under orders of a Rhea County Unionist and were forced to march to the Tennessee River. From there, they were transported to Chattanooga aboard the USS Chattanooga. Once in Chattanooga, Union officers realized the women were not a threat and ordered them released and returned to Rhea County. They first were required to take the oath of allegiance to the United States government. The Spartans were not an officially recognized unit of the Confederate Army.

In 1890, the county seat was moved from the Washington community to its present location in Dayton. This was a result of several causes, such as the completion of the Cincinnati-Chattanooga Railroad in Smith's Crossroads, the rapid growth of Chattanooga, the detrimental effects of the American Civil War, and the emigration of its prominent citizens.

The Scopes Trial, which resulted from the teaching of evolution being banned in Tennessee public schools under the Butler Act, took place in Rhea County in 1925. The trial was one of the first to be referred to as the "trial of the century". William Jennings Bryan played a role as prosecutor in trial, and he died in Dayton shortly after the trial ended. A statue of Bryan was erected on the grounds of the Rhea County Courthouse in 2010. A statue of the defense lawyer in the case, Clarence Darrow, was erected at the courthouse in 2017.

In 1956, the State Supreme Court upheld a "regular and customary practice among certain of the teachers, during the regular school hours and in the classrooms, to read, or have some pupil read from, the Bible; to ask questions of the pupils concerning the content of such passages; to repeat prayers, usually that prayer known as the Lord's Prayer as it appears in the sixth chapter of the Book of Matthew in the King James version of the Bible; to sing hymns and other religious songs; and to inquire of the pupils as to their attendance or non-attendance at Sunday School," where Sunday School attendance remained compulsory in Tennessee at the time, though that law was apparently—to some teachers chagrin—no longer being enforced. The court there held that precluding teachers from doing so violated the State Constitution, Article 1, § 3:

That all men have a natural and indefeasible right to worship Almighty God according to the dictates of their own conscience; that no man can of right be compelled to attend, erect, or support any place of worship, or to maintain any minister against his consent; that no human authority can, in any case whatever, control or interfere with the rights of conscience; and that no preference shall ever be given, by law, to any religious establishment or mode of worship.

The court then held that it exceeded the Equal Protection guarantees of the 14th Amendment of the U.S. Constitution "to have their children taught what they desire ... subject to qualification that teachers and places must be reputable and things taught not immoral or inimical to public welfare," a reading of that amendment that has since been overruled as to religious teaching in schools by both the Colorado court that provided the quotation, and by the U.S. Supreme Court. At the time, though, the State Supreme Court reasoned: "complainants, we feel that they have taken a rather narrow and dogmatic view of these constitutional inhibitions. In their commendable zeal in behalf of liberty of conscience, and of religious worship, they have overlooked the broader concept that religion per se is something which transcends all man-made creeds." On June 8, 2004, a federal appeals court upheld a ruling banning further Bible instructions as a violation of the First Amendment principle of "Separation of church and state".

On March 16, 2004, Rhea County commissioner J.C. Fugate prompted a vote on a ban on homosexuals in Tennessee, allowing the county to charge them with "crimes against nature". The measure passed, 8–0. Several of the commissioners who voted for the resolution chose not to run for reelection or were voted out of office. The resolution was withdrawn on March 18. In protest, a "Gay Day in Rhea" was held on May 8, 2004, with about 400 participants.

== Geography ==
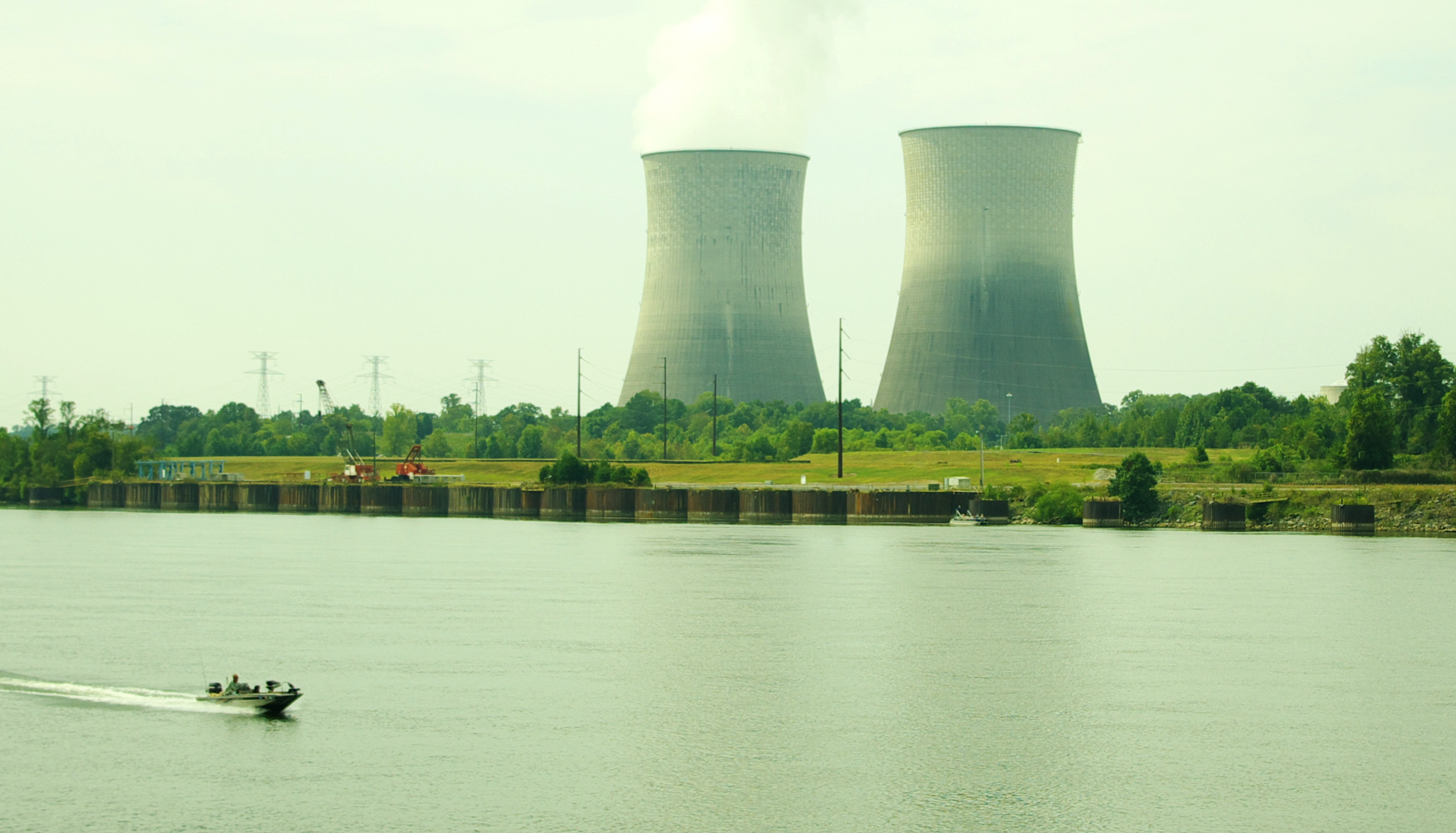
The cooling towers of Watts Bar Nuclear Generating Station, with the Tennessee River in the foreground

According to the U.S. Census Bureau, the county has a total area of 336 square miles (870 km^{2}), of which 21 square miles (54 km^{2}) (6.3%) are covered by water.

Walden Ridge, part of the Cumberland Plateau, provides Rhea County's border with Bledsoe County to the west. The Tennessee River forms Rhea's border with Meigs County to the east. Whites Creek, a tributary of the Tennessee River, forms Rhea's border with Roane County to the north. Watts Bar Dam straddles the Tennessee River near Spring City. The section of the river upstream from the dam is part of Watts Bar Lake, and the section downstream is part of Chickamauga Lake. A nuclear power plant, Watts Bar Nuclear Generating Station, is located near Watts Bar Dam.

The county is in the Eastern Time Zone, but Bledsoe and Cumberland counties, which border it on the west, observe Central Time.

The major north–south road in Rhea County is U.S. Route 27. Major east–west roads include State Route 30, which intersects US-27 in Dayton, and State Route 68, which connects Spring City with Madisonville and Crossville.

=== Adjacent counties ===
- Cumberland County (northwest)
- Roane County (northeast)
- Meigs County (east)
- Hamilton County (south)
- Bledsoe County (west)

=== State protected areas ===
- Chickamauga Wildlife Management Area (part)
- Cumberland Trail (part)
- Hiwassee Refuge (part)
- Laurel-Snow State Natural Area
- Piney Falls State Natural Area
- Stringing Fork Falls State Natural Area
- Yuchi Refuge

== Demographics ==
Historical population
Census	Pop.	Note	%±
1810	2,504		—
1820	4,215		68.3%
1830	8,186		94.2%
1840	3,985		−51.3%
1850	4,415		10.8%
1860	4,991		13.0%
1870	5,538		11.0%
1880	7,073		27.7%
1890	12,647		78.8%
1900	14,318		13.2%
1910	15,410		7.6%
1920	13,812		−10.4%
1930	13,871		0.4%
1940	16,353		17.9%
1950	16,041		−1.9%
1960	15,863		−1.1%
1970	17,202		8.4%
1980	24,235		40.9%
1990	24,344		0.4%
2000	28,400		16.7%
2010	31,809		12.0%
2020	32,870		3.3%
2025 (est.)	34,844	▲	6.0%
U.S. Decennial Census; 1790-1960 1900-1990; 1990-2000 2010-2014

=== Racial and ethnic composition ===
Rhea County, Tennessee – Racial and ethnic composition Note: the US Census treats Hispanic/Latino as an ethnic category. This table excludes Latinos from the racial categories and assigns them to a separate category. Hispanics/Latinos may be of any race.
Race / Ethnicity (NH = Non-Hispanic)	Pop 1980	Pop 1990	Pop 2000	Pop 2010	Pop 2020	% 1980	% 1990	% 2000	% 2010	% 2020
White alone (NH)	23,351	23,517	26,880	29,303	28,641	96.35%	96.60%	94.65%	92.12%	87.13%
Black or African American alone (NH)	611	578	564	609	598	2.52%	2.37%	1.99%	1.91%	1.82%
Native American or Alaska Native alone (NH)	45	54	107	126	100	0.19%	0.22%	0.38%	0.40%	0.30%
Asian alone (NH)	67	52	83	128	195	0.28%	0.21%	0.29%	0.40%	0.59%
Native Hawaiian or Pacific Islander alone (NH)	x	x	8	14	6	x	x	0.03%	0.04%	0.02%
Other race alone (NH)	3	11	14	25	69	0.01%	0.05%	0.05%	0.08%	0.21%
Mixed race or Multiracial (NH)	x	x	270	417	1,301	x	x	0.95%	1.31%	3.96%
Hispanic or Latino (any race)	158	132	474	1,187	1,960	0.65%	0.54%	1.67%	3.73%	5.96%
Total	24,235	24,344	28,400	31,809	32,870	100.00%	100.00%	100.00%	100.00%	100.00%

=== 2020 census ===
As of the 2020 census, 32,870 people, 13,082 households, and 8,235 families resided in the county.

The median age was 42.1 years, with 22.0% of residents under the age of 18 and 19.9% 65 years of age or older. For every 100 females there were 97.9 males, and for every 100 females age 18 and over there were 96.6 males age 18 and over.

The racial makeup of the county was 88.2% White, 1.8% Black or African American, 0.6% American Indian and Alaska Native, 0.6% Asian, <0.1% Native Hawaiian and Pacific Islander, 3.4% from some other race, and 5.4% from two or more races. Hispanic or Latino residents of any race comprised 6.0% of the population.

29.5% of residents lived in urban areas, while 70.5% lived in rural areas.

There were 13,082 households in the county, of which 29.3% had children under the age of 18 living in them. Of all households, 49.1% were married-couple households, 18.9% were households with a male householder and no spouse or partner present, and 25.4% were households with a female householder and no spouse or partner present. About 26.9% of all households were made up of individuals and 12.3% had someone living alone who was 65 years of age or older.

There were 15,163 housing units, of which 13.7% were vacant. Among occupied housing units, 69.0% were owner-occupied and 31.0% were renter-occupied. The homeowner vacancy rate was 1.8% and the rental vacancy rate was 8.2%.

=== 2000 census ===
As of the census of 2000, 28,400 people, 11,184 households, and 8,108 families resided in the county. The population density was 90 people per square mile (35 people/km^{2}). The 12,565 housing units had an average density of 40 units per square mile (15 units/km^{2}). The racial makeup of the county was 95.41% White, 2.04% African American, 0.39% Native American, 0.29% Asian, 0.79% from other races, and 1.08% from two or more races. About 1.67% of the population was Hispanic or Latino of any race.

Of the 11,184 households, 31.2% had children under 18 living with them, 57.4% were married couples living together, 11.2% had a female householder with no husband present, and 27.5% were not families. About 23.8% of all households were made up of individuals, and 9.9% had someone living alone who was 65 or older. The average household size was 2.46, and the average family size was 2.90.

In the county, the age distribution was 23.7% under 18, 10.0% from 18 to 24, 27.5% from 25 to 44, 25.0% from 45 to 64, and 13.8% who were 65 or older. The median age was 37 years. For every 100 females, there were 94.30 males. For every 100 females 18 and over, there were 91.70 males.

The median income for a household in Rhea County was $28,418, and for a family was $33,580. Males had a median income of $21,066 versus $16,063 for females. The per capita income for the county was $15,672. About 34.7% of the population were below the poverty line, including 19.00% of those under age 18 and 15.20% of those age 65 or over.

== Government ==
United States presidential election results for Rhea County, Tennessee
Year	Republican		Democratic		Third party(ies)	
Year	No.	%	No.	%	No.	%
1912	253	16.59%	692	45.38%	580	38.03%
1916	768	52.60%	661	45.27%	31	2.12%
1920	1,341	55.57%	1,051	43.56%	21	0.87%
1924	1,168	48.59%	1,169	48.63%	67	2.79%
1928	1,585	65.23%	842	34.65%	3	0.12%
1932	1,448	47.69%	1,550	51.05%	38	1.25%
1936	1,964	46.75%	2,199	52.34%	38	0.90%
1940	1,956	45.11%	2,364	54.52%	16	0.37%
1944	1,880	54.32%	1,581	45.68%	0	0.00%
1948	2,077	50.04%	1,897	45.70%	177	4.26%
1952	2,520	54.46%	2,090	45.17%	17	0.37%
1956	2,516	55.70%	1,930	42.73%	71	1.57%
1960	2,721	59.78%	1,761	38.69%	70	1.54%
1964	2,730	50.87%	2,637	49.13%	0	0.00%
1968	2,428	40.70%	1,301	21.81%	2,237	37.50%
1972	3,842	72.50%	1,312	24.76%	145	2.74%
1976	3,449	47.63%	3,735	51.58%	57	0.79%
1980	4,689	59.44%	3,070	38.91%	130	1.65%
1984	5,692	66.29%	2,804	32.65%	91	1.06%
1988	5,144	66.15%	2,595	33.37%	37	0.48%
1992	4,860	46.97%	4,289	41.45%	1,199	11.59%
1996	4,476	48.72%	3,969	43.20%	743	8.09%
2000	5,900	60.38%	3,722	38.09%	150	1.53%
2004	7,301	66.05%	3,665	33.16%	88	0.80%
2008	8,042	72.41%	2,907	26.18%	157	1.41%
2012	7,802	73.67%	2,628	24.82%	160	1.51%
2016	8,660	78.29%	1,942	17.56%	460	4.16%
2020	11,050	81.03%	2,369	17.37%	218	1.60%
2024	11,974	82.90%	2,312	16.01%	158	1.09%

Rhea County uses the county commission form of local government. The nine seats on the county commission each represent a geographical area of the county. Members of the commission and the county executive are elected to four-year terms.

Rhea County is part of the 3rd Congressional District of Tennessee. Until 2003, Rhea County was part of the 4th Congressional District, and was represented by Rhea County native Van Hilleary. Hilleary ran unsuccessfully for governor in 2002. Beginning in 2013, Rhea County again became part of the 4th District.

At the state level, Rhea County is part of the 31st district of the Tennessee House of Representatives. The 31st is made up of Rhea County and the northern portion of Hamilton County. The county is part of the 1st district in the Tennessee Senate.

Rhea County is generally a Republican-leaning county in Presidential elections and in congressional elections. The county voted for John McCain in 2008. The last Democrat to win a majority in the county was Jimmy Carter in 1976. On account of the third-party candidacy of Ross Perot, the Republican candidate received less than 50% in the 1992 and in 1996. Ross Perot drew 11.2% and 7.6% of the vote in 1992 and 1996, respectively.

== Education ==
Rhea County Schools, the county-administered public school system, serves most Rhea County students. The system operates three elementary schools, two middle schools, two K-8 schools, one high school (Rhea County High School), and one alternative school.

The City of Dayton operates a K-8 school, Dayton City School, that serves the children who live within the city limits. All public-school students in the county, however, attend Rhea County High School, in Evensville, upon leaving the eighth grade, as the city does not have a high school. The high school has an enrollment around 1,500 students.

Rhea County Academy is a private, not-for-profit K4-12 school located in Dayton. The school was started in 2003 and currently enrolls about 150 students.

Bryan College, a four-year Christian liberal arts college, has its campus in Dayton. The college is named for William Jennings Bryan. Chattanooga State Community College also has a small satellite campus in Dayton. Additionally, Oxford Graduate School, an international graduate-level Christian college serving working adults has its campus in Dayton.

== Communities ==
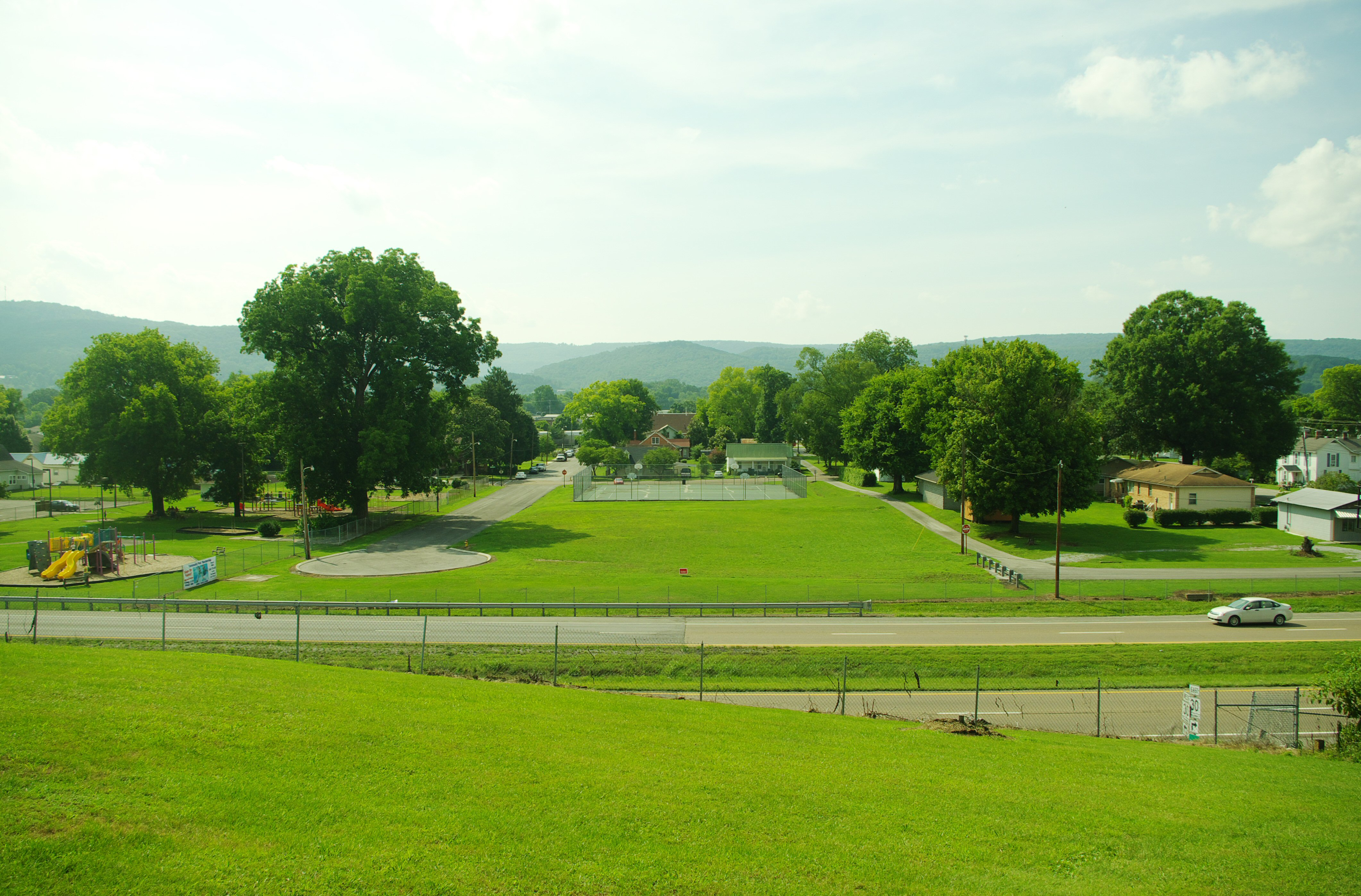
View of Dayton from Cedar Glen Lane

=== City ===
- Dayton (county seat)

=== Towns ===
- Graysville
- Spring City

=== Unincorporated communities ===
- Evensville
- Five Points
- Grandview
- Liberty Hill
- Ogden
- Old Washington

=== Former community ===
- Rhea Springs

== Notable people ==
- Archie Butler (actor), an actor, stunt man, and crewman in numerous films and television shows, was born here on September 27, 1911.
- Hargus "Pig" Robbins (musician), an American session keyboard and piano player was born here on January 18, 1938.
- Arnim LeRoy Fox, better known as Curly Fox, was an American old-time and country fiddler, singer, and country musician that was born here on November 9, 1910.
- John Randolph Neal Jr. was an American attorney, law professor, politician, and activist who was born here on September 17, 1876.
- May Erwin Talmadge, 19th President General of the Daughters of the American Revolution

== See also ==
- National Register of Historic Places listings in Rhea County, Tennessee
