= Dayton City School =

School district and elementary/middle school in Dayton, Tennessee

- The Sweatbees

Address
- 520 Cherry Street Dayton, Tennessee, 37321; United States
- Coordinates: 35.4874°N 85.0166°W

District information
- Type: Public
- Grades: PreK–8
- NCES District ID: 4700930

Students and staff
- Students: 823 (2020–2021)
- Teachers: 56.0 (on an FTE basis)
- Staff: 55.5 (on an FTE basis)
- Student–teacher ratio: 14.7:1

Other information
- Website: www.daytoncity.net

Dayton City School (DCS) is a municipal school district in Dayton, Tennessee which consists of a single K-8 school.

The district's attendance boundary is the city limits of Dayton. High school students attend Rhea County High School, operated by Rhea County Schools.

== History ==
The school was established in 1907.

In 1948 the University of Tennessee established an extension program that allowed for teachers at Rhea County Schools to study for a bachelor's degree. Dayton City School teachers were eligible for the same program.

In February 1951 the school had 350 students. That month a fire damaged the school facility. Two wings, which included the auditorium and cafeteria, were not damaged, while the fire severely damaged the classroom wings. L. A. Morgan, the mayor of Dayton, stated that the fire had a cost of $100,000. Churches served as temporary classroom locations.

By January 1952 the district paid $70,000 to build a new facility.
