= Rachel Held Evans =

American writer

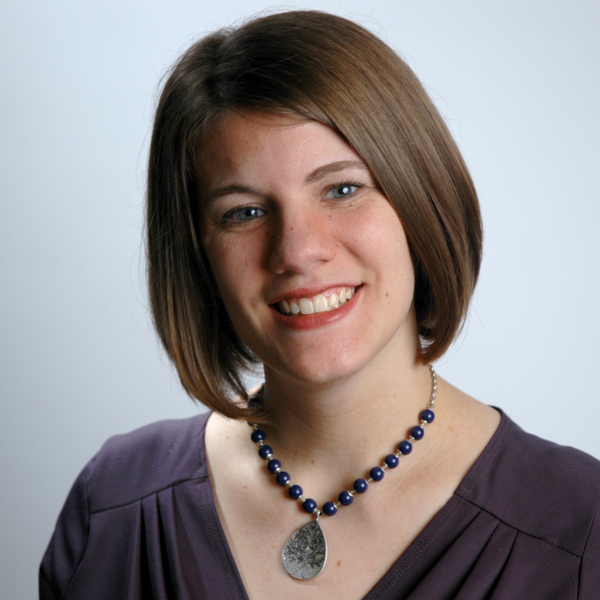
- Held Evans c. 2010
- Born: Rachel Grace Held; June 8, 1981; Birmingham, Alabama, U.S.
- Died: May 4, 2019 (aged 37); Nashville, Tennessee, U.S.
- Education: Bryan College (BA)
- Occupations: Columnist; author
- Spouse: Dan Evans (m. 2003)
- Children: 2
- Writing career
- Period: 2004–2019
- Genre: Christian
- Website: rachelheldevans.com

Rachel Held Evans (née Rachel Grace Held; June 8, 1981 – May 4, 2019) was an American columnist and author. Her book A Year of Biblical Womanhood was a New York Times bestseller in e-book non-fiction, and Searching for Sunday was a New York Times bestseller nonfiction paperback.

== Early life and education ==
Evans was born in Alabama to Robin and Peter Held and spent her early years in Birmingham, Alabama. When she was 14, she and her family moved to Dayton, Tennessee, where her father took an administrative position at Bryan College. She attended Rhea County High School, then went to Bryan College where she majored in English literature. She received her Bachelor of Arts degree in 2003.

== Career ==
After graduating from college, Evans moved to Chattanooga, Tennessee, to intern for the Chattanooga Times Free Press.

In 2004, Evans returned to Dayton where she worked full-time for The Herald-News, the local paper. In 2006, she switched from full-time employment to writing pro bono as the paper's humor columnist; in 2007, she won an award for Best Personal Humor Column from the Tennessee Press Association. She continued to write freelance articles for national publications and began to blog.

In September 2008, Evans signed with Zondervan for her first book, Evolving in Monkey Town. The book explores her journey from religious certainty to a faith which accepts doubt and questioning; the title is based on the Scopes Monkey Trial that took place in Dayton. Her second book, A Year of Biblical Womanhood: How a Liberated Woman Found Herself Sitting on Her Roof, Covering Her Head, and Calling Her Husband Master, was published in October 2012. She recounts how she spent an entire year of living a Biblical lifestyle literally. The book also garnered national media attention for Evans as she appeared on The Today Show. In 2014, Evans re-released Evolving in Monkey Town with the new title of Faith Unraveled.

In 2015, she wrote a column in The Washington Post: "Want millennials back in the pews? Stop trying to make church 'cool.'" In the column she self-identified as a millennial and expressed her belief that churches attempting to attract more millennials were wrong in their approach because they focused primarily on stylistic aspects of the church experience, which "are not the key to drawing millennials back to God in a lasting and meaningful way. Young people don't simply want a better show."

President Barack Obama appointed Evans to the President’s Advisory Council on Faith-Based and Neighborhood Partnerships in January 2016.

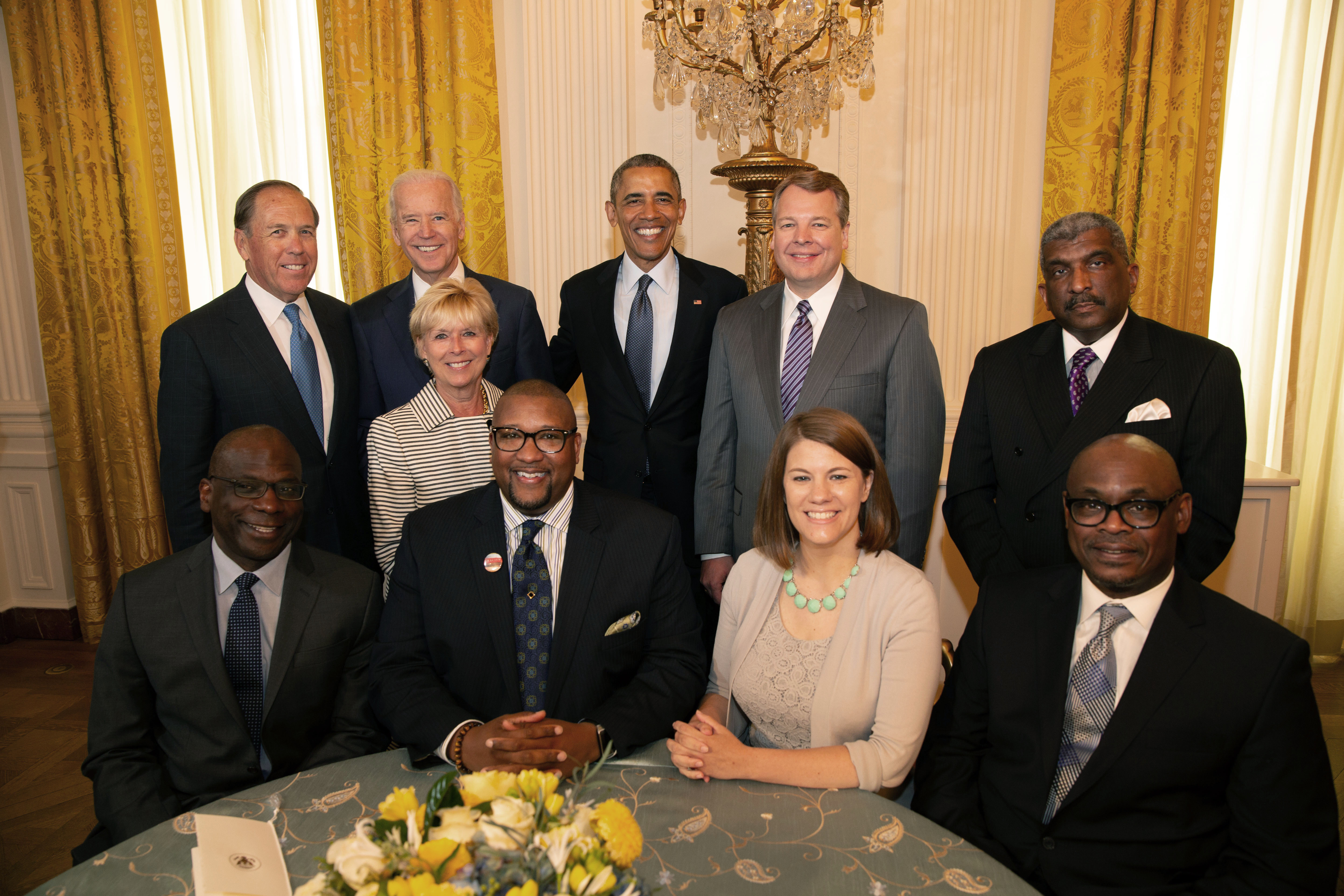
Evans (seated, second from right) with Barack Obama and Joe Biden at the White House

In early August 2016, Evans published an editorial for Vox defending her "pro-life Christian" position and support for Democratic presidential nominee Hillary Clinton in the 2016 U.S. presidential election.

In 2018, Held Evans and Sarah Bessey co-founded the Evolving Faith Conference, an annual gathering of young progressive Christians. They expected about 200 people to attend the first conference in Montreat, North Carolina, and had 1,400 attend. Jeff Chu joined them as co-organizer for the October 2019 conference, which became "in part a consolation for readers, friends and devotees of Rachel Held Evans" after her death in May of that year.

== Death ==
Evans was placed in a medically induced coma in April 2019 following an allergic reaction to medication for an infection. By May 2, "severe swelling of the brain" worsened her condition, and she died on May 4.

== Personal life ==
In 2003, Evans married her college boyfriend, Dan Evans. The couple had two children. She was an Episcopalian who attended St. Luke's Episcopal Church in Cleveland, Tennessee. At the time of her death, she no longer considered herself to be an evangelical due to the movement's close association with the Christian right in the United States.

== Legacy ==
Emma Green, writing for The Atlantic, notes that Evans "was part of a vanguard of progressive-Christian women who fought to change the way Christianity is taught and perceived in the United States." Green goes on to argue that Evans' legacy is "her unwillingness to cede ownership of Christianity to its traditional conservative-male stewards" and that her "very public, vulnerable exploration of a faith forged in doubt empowered a ragtag band of writers, pastors, and teachers to claim their rightful place as Christians."

== Books ==
- Evans, Rachel Held (2010), Evolving in Monkey Town: How a Girl Who Knew All the Answers Learned to Ask the Questions, Zondervan, ISBN 978-0-31029399-6, republished as ——— (2014), Faith Unraveled: How a Girl Who Knew All the Answers Learned to Ask Questions, Zondervan, ISBN 978-0-31033916-8
- ——— (2012), A Year of Biblical Womanhood: How a Liberated Woman Found Herself Sitting on Her Roof, Covering Her Head, and Calling Her Husband Master, Thomas Nelson, ISBN 978-1-59555367-6
- ——— (2015), Searching for Sunday: Loving, Leaving, and Finding the Church, Thomas Nelson, ISBN 978-0-71802212-9
- ——— (2018). Inspired: Slaying Giants, Walking on Water, and Loving the Bible Again. Thomas Nelson. ISBN 978-1-40021107-4.
- Evans, Rachel Held; Turner, Matthew Paul (June 15, 2021). What is God Like?. Daniel Jonce Evans, Ying Hui Tan. Convergent Books. ISBN 978-0593193310.
- Evans, Rachel Held; Chu, Jeff (2021). Wholehearted Faith. Harper One (published November 2, 2021). ISBN 978-0062894472.
