= Chanequa Walker-Barnes =

American theologian and psychologist

Chanequa Walker-Barnes is an American theologian and psychologist. Her research as a clinical psychologist has focused on African American health disparities, and as a womanist theologian she has written about the myth of the "StrongBlackWoman" and the need for the voices of women of color. She has written two books, Too Heavy a Yoke and I Bring the Voices of My People.

== Early life and education ==
Walker-Barnes was born and raised in Atlanta. She has spoken about growing up in a "racially conscious family in the Deep South". Her grandfathers were sharecroppers, and her paternal grandfather and great-grandfather ran away from the White farmer who "owned" them in the early 1900s. Her parents, Wali Sharif and Laquitta Walker, met when they were in one of the first groups of Black students to integrate their school in Atlanta. She lived with her mother and brother in the home of Hosea Williams with his daughter, Elisabeth Omilami, her mother's best friend.

Walker-Barnes has a B.A. in psychology from Emory University and a M.S. and PhD in Clinical Child and Family Psychology from the University of Miami. She later earned a Masters of Divinity from Duke Divinity School, where she was mentored by Willie James Jennings.

== Career ==
Walker-Barnes worked as a research psychologist, focusing on ethnic minority families, African American adolescent development and health disparities. After attending seminary, she focused on racial and gender justice. She was ordained by an independent church fellowship.

Walker-Barnes has been on the faculty at Shaw University, the University of North Carolina at Chapel Hill, the University of Florida and Duke University. Until 2021, she was associate professor of Practical Theology at the McAfee School of Theology at Mercer University, where she taught pastoral care and counseling. In 2015, she organised the first Women of Color retreat with Christena Cleveland to support and encourage women of color of faith. In 2019, she facilitated the Writing for Mystic Activists workshop for the Collegeville Institute for Ecumenical and Cultural Research.

Walker-Barnes was on staff at a white-majority church, but left after the George Zimmerman verdict saying, "We were mourning. And we went to church on Sunday morning hoping we would hear a word of comfort. And many of us who went to either multi-racial or predominately white spaces found no word of comfort. We found no word at all."

In 2021, Walker-Barnes was appointed to the faculty of Columbia Theological Seminary as Professor of Practical Theology and Pastoral Counseling.

Walker-Barnes is on the editorial board for the Society of Pastoral Theology's Journal of Pastoral Theology and is co-chair of their Embodiment Study Group. She is a member of the American Academy of Religion, the American Psychological Association and the Georgia Psychological Association.

=== Writing ===
Walker-Barnes' book Too Heavy a Yoke: Black Women and the Burden of Strength talks about what she calls "Strong Black Woman Syndrome", a cultural stereotype that initially developed as a defense against negative stereotypes of African American women - "the manipulative Jezebel, the Mammy, the Sapphire" - but leads to the burdensome expectation that black women be "super capable ... take care of others ... [and] emotionally strong to the point of stoicism." She calls out churches for perpetuating and spiritualizing the stereotype, which has had negative physical and mental health consequences.

Her 2019 book I Bring the Voices of My People: A Womanist Vision for Racial Reconciliation points out the inadequacy of the contemporary white evangelical approach to racial reconciliation and proposes an alternative, drawing on the work of womanist, feminist, and Black liberation theologians including James Cone and J. Deotis Roberts.

In 2021, a prayer written by Walker-Barnes was included in Sarah Bessey's book, A Rhythm of Prayer, a collection of prayers by women writers. The prayer, "Prayer of a weary Black Woman", provoked controversy. The prayer opens with, "Dear God, please help me to hate White people". Some called for Target to remove the book from stores, and described it as "anti-biblical". Walker-Barnes received harassing emails, calls and social media posts, as did her institution. Bessey defended Walker-Barnes, saying "While some may consider this to be a provocative start to a prayer, its intentional extraction from the rest of the prayer obscures its context and the biblical model it is based on ... Our sister is bringing her weariness and her anger over the real sin of racism to God."

== Personal life ==
Walker-Barnes is married to Delwin Barnes, a mechanical engineer. They have a son and live in Atlanta, Georgia. She is a survivor of breast cancer.

== Selected publications ==
=== Books ===
- Walker-Barnes, Chanequa (2014). Too Heavy a Yoke: Black Women and the Burden of Strength. Wipf and Stock. ISBN 9781620320662.
- Walker-Barnes, Chanequa (2019). I Bring the Voices of My People: A Womanist Vision for Racial Reconciliation. Eerdmans. ISBN 9781467457392.

=== Articles and chapters ===
- Walker-Barnes, Chanequa J; Mason, Craig A (2001). "Ethnic differences in the effect of parenting on gang involvement and gang delinquency: A longitudinal, hierarchical linear modeling perspective". Child Development. 72 (6): 1814–1831. doi:10.1111/1467-8624.00380. PMID 11768147. S2CID 25745831.
- Mason, Craig A; Walker-Barnes, Chanequa J; Tu, Shihfen; Simons, Julie; Martinez-Arrue, Rafael (2004). "Ethnic differences in the affective meaning of parental control behaviors". Journal of Primary Prevention. 25 (1): 59–79. doi:10.1023/B:JOPP.0000039939.83804.37. S2CID 44025656.
- Stevenson, Howard C.; Winn, Donna-Marie; Walker-Barnes, Chanequa; Coard, Stephanie I. (2005). "Style matters : toward a culturally relevant framework for interventions with African American families". In Vonnie C. McLoyd; Nancy E. Hill; Kenneth A. Dodge (eds.). African American Family Life: Ecological and Cultural Diversity. Guilford Press. pp. 311–334. ISBN 9781572309951.
- Street, Jalika; Harris-Britt, April; Walker-Barnes, Chanequa (2009). "Examining relationships between ethnic identity, family environment, and psychological outcomes for African American adolescents". Journal of Child and Family Studies. 18 (4): 412–420. doi:10.1007/s10826-008-9245-7. S2CID 144486694.
- Walker-Barnes, Chanequa (2009). "The burden of the strong Black woman". Journal of Pastoral Theology. 19 (1): 1–21. doi:10.1179/jpt.2009.19.1.002. S2CID 147673346.
- Walker-Barnes, C. (2017). "When the bough breaks: The StrongBlackWoman and the embodiment of stress". In S. Y. Evans; K. Bell; N. K. Burton (eds.). Black women's mental health: Balancing strength and vulnerability. State University of New York Press. pp. 43–55.
- Walker-Barnes, Chanequa (2019). "Response to Rev. Michael McBride Plenary,'Conversions in the Age of Trump'Society for Pastoral Theology, June 14, 2018". Journal of Pastoral Theology. 29 (1): 13–18. doi:10.1080/10649867.2019.1603872. S2CID 197903580.
- Walker-Barnes, Chanequa (2019). "Is it Time for a Womanist Theology of Reconciliation?". In Mae Elise Cannon; Andrea Smith (eds.). Evangelical Theologies of Liberation and Justice. InterVarsity Press. pp. 53–74. ISBN 9780830870967.
- Walker-Barnes, Chanequa (2019). "Foreword". In Danielle J. Buhuro (ed.). Spiritual care in an age of #blacklivesmatter : examining the spiritual and prophetic needs of African Americans in a violent America. Wipf and Stock. pp. xi–xvi. ISBN 9781532648083.
