= Sarah Bessey =

Canadian Christian author and blogger

Sarah Styles Bessey (born 1979) is a Canadian Christian author and blogger. She has written four popular books and is the co-founder and cohost of the Evolving Faith Conference and podcast.

== Background and personal life ==
Sarah Styles was born in Regina and grew up in Saskatchewan and Alberta before attending Oral Roberts University in Tulsa, Oklahoma. She grew up attending church during the charismatic renewal movement in Western Canada. She married Brian Bessey in 2001 and they lived in Tulsa before moving to Vancouver, where he attended Regent College before becoming a pastor. They have four children and live in Calgary, Alberta.

Bessey began deconstructing her Christian faith after experiencing a miscarriage, which she says meant "I didn't really have the option to choose the intellectual and spiritual dishonesty of pretending that I was fine." This led to her seeing faith as always "growing, changing and evolving". In 2013, she said she "cherished" her role as something of an outsider to American evangelicalism. In 2014, she described herself as "too liberal for conservatives, too conservative for liberals." Bessey was a member of a Vineyard church, however in 2019, she shared on Facebook that her family had left due to her support for the full inclusion of LGBT people in the church. In 2021, she shared that she had returned to a local church.

== Writing career ==
Bessey began blogging in 2005 to keep in touch with friends and family. Over the subsequent years, this led to numerous speaking engagements and the writing of her books. Bessey said, "The internet gave women like me — women who are outside of the usual power and leadership narratives and structures — a voice and a community ... Blogging gave us a way past the gatekeepers of evangelicalism."

Blog posts by Bessey that received wide attention and commentary include a 2013 article, "I am Damaged Goods", about the place of purity culture within Christianity, and her 2019 posts "Nope, Not Going Home" in response to evangelical pastor John F. MacArthur asserting that Beth Moore should "go home" and not preach, and "Why everything you know about the Nativity is probably wrong", dealing with Western misconceptions and whitewashing of the Nativity of Jesus.

Bessey said the title of her 2013 book, Jesus Feminist, started as "a bit of a joke" when people asked her what kind of feminist she was. The book outlines how she is a feminist because of the Bible and the way Jesus is "subversive" in turning power structures and household codes on their head. Her 2015 book, Out of Sorts is a memoir of her own faith crisis and return.

In 2017, Bessey started a Twitter thread with the hashtag "Things Only Christian Women Hear" that saw hundreds of responses sharing experiences of sexism in Christian communities.

Bessey was a close friend of fellow writer Rachel Held Evans, speaking at her funeral, and writing a eulogy with Jeff Chu for The Washington Post. Bessey co-hosts the Evolving Faith Conference, an annual gathering of young progressive Christians she co-founded with Held Evans in 2018. They expected about 200 people to attend the first conference in Montreat, North Carolina, and had 1,400 attend. Jeff Chu joined them as co-organizer for the October 2019 conference, which became "in part a consolation for readers, friends and devotees of Rachel Held Evans" after her sudden death in May that year. Bessey and Chu also host The Evolving Faith Podcast.

Bessey's 2020 book Miracles and Other Reasonable Things explores the pain and trauma she experienced from a serious car accident and her recovery through both a miraculous healing encounter with two priests in Rome and continued medical treatment and self-care. Her 2021 book, A Rhythm of Prayer, a New York Times Bestseller, is a collection of prayers by other women writers. One prayer in the book, "Prayer of a weary Black Woman" by Professor Chanequa Walker-Barnes, provoked controversy from conservative Christians on social media due to its opening words, "Dear God, please help me to hate White people", with some calling for Target to remove the book from stores. Bessey defended Walker-Barnes, saying "While some may consider this to be a provocative start to a prayer, its intentional extraction from the rest of the prayer obscures its context and the biblical model it is based on ... Our sister is bringing her weariness and her anger over the real sin of racism to God."

Bessey has been chair of the board for a charity called Heartline Ministries Haiti since 2017.

== Books ==
- Bessey, Sarah (2013). Jesus Feminist: An Invitation to Revisit the Bible's View of Women. Simon and Schuster. ISBN 9781476717258.
- Bessey, Sarah (2015). Out of Sorts: Making Peace with an Evolving Faith. Simon and Schuster. ISBN 9781476717593.
- Bessey, Sarah (2020). Miracles and Other Reasonable Things: A Story of Unlearning and Relearning God. Simon and Schuster. ISBN 9781982126131.
- Sarah Bessey, ed. (2021). A Rhythm of Prayer: A Collection of Meditations for Renewal. SPCK. ISBN 9780281085163.
