= Graysville, Tennessee =

- Town
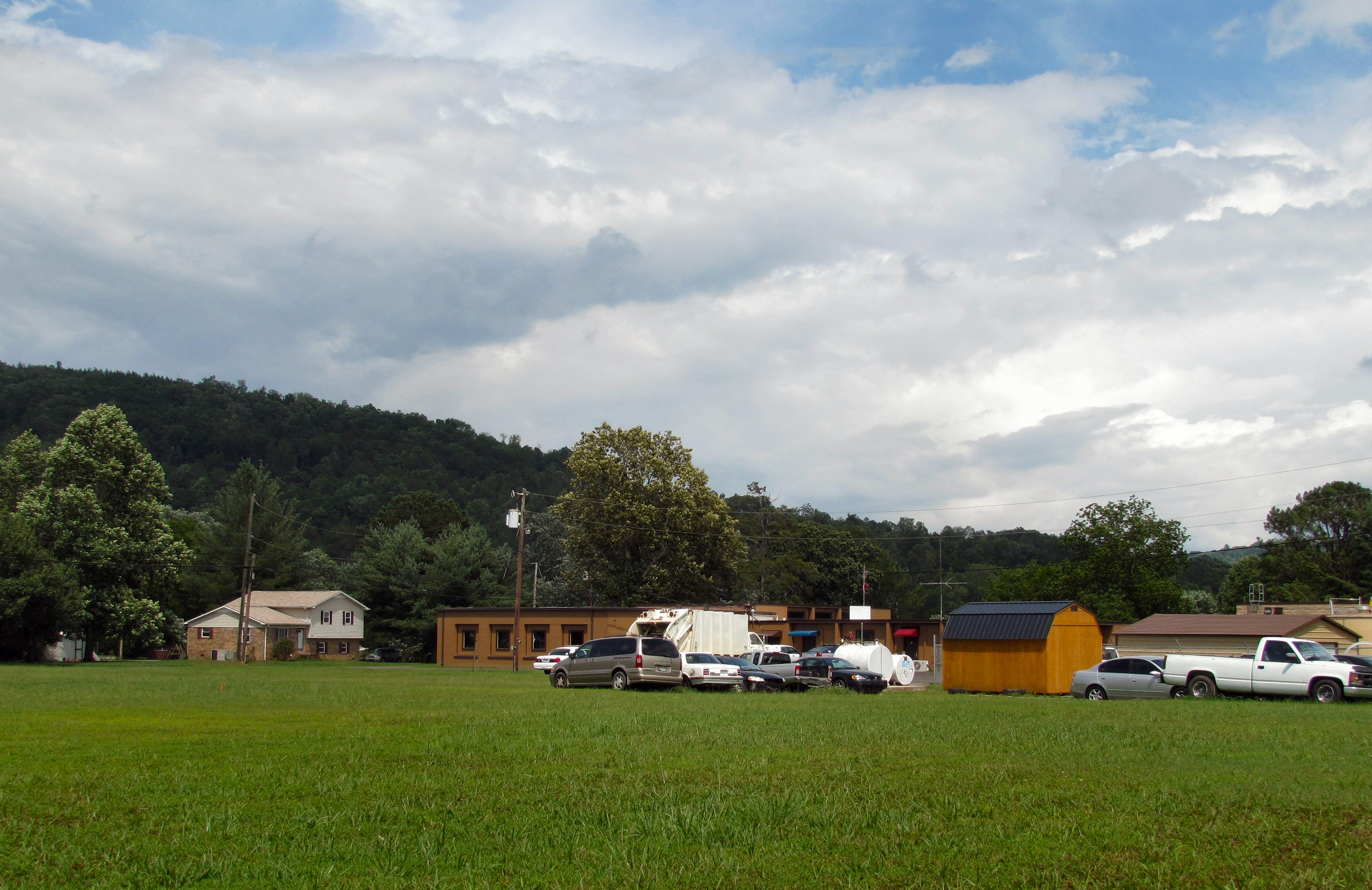

- Location of Graysville in Rhea County, Tennessee.
- Coordinates: 35°26′52″N 85°4′57″W
- Country: United States
- State: Tennessee
- County: Rhea
- Named after: William Gray, early settler

Area
  - Total: 1.18 sq mi (3.05 km^{2})
  - Land: 1.18 sq mi (3.05 km^{2})
  - Water: 0 sq mi (0.00 km^{2})
- Elevation: 748 ft (228 m)

Population (2020)
  - Total: 1,471
  - Density: 1,249.0/sq mi (482.25/km^{2})
- Time zone: UTC-5 (Eastern (EST))
  - Summer (DST): UTC-4 (EDT)
- ZIP code: 37338
- Area code: 423
- FIPS code: 47-30760
- GNIS feature ID: 1286033
- Website: graysvilletn.gov

Graysville is a town in Rhea County, Tennessee, United States. The population was 1,471 at the 2020 census and 1,502 at the 2010 census.

== History ==
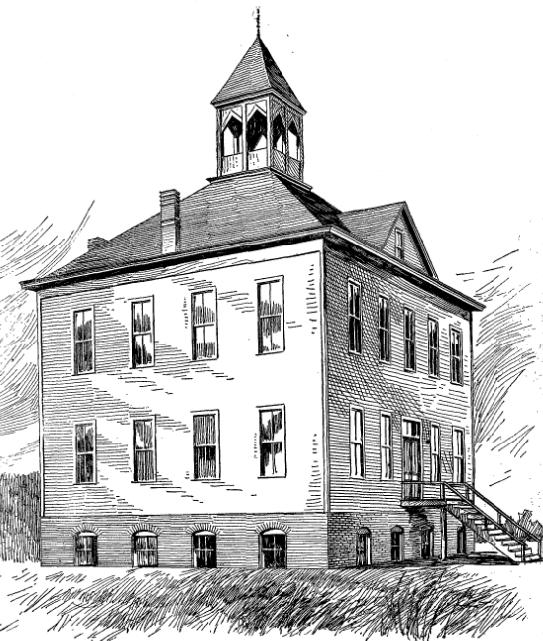
Graysville Academy, established in 1892 in Graysville, was a Seventh-day Adventist institution that was later to become Southern Adventist University.

Graysville is named for William Gray, an early settler who was appointed postmaster in 1875. The town expanded in the 1880s, when the arrival of the railroad brought coal extraction industries to the area. During this period, the Dayton Coal and Iron Company established a major operation at Graysville. Coal mined nearby was converted into coke, which in turn was used to fuel two blast furnaces to produce pig iron. This operation continued until the Great Depression brought about a general collapse in the industry in the 1930s.

== Geography ==
Graysville is located at 35°26′52″N 85°4′57″W (35.447848, -85.082437). It is situated along Roaring Creek between Walden Ridge (an escarpment of the Cumberland Plateau) and Blackoak Ridge, just north of the Rhea-Hamilton line. U.S. Route 27 passes through the eastern part of Graysville while State Route 303 passes straight through downtown.

According to the United States Census Bureau, the town has a total area of 0.8 square miles (2.1 km^{2}), all of it land.

== Demographics ==
Historical population
Census	Pop.	Note	%±
1920	786		—
1930	793		0.9%
1940	846		6.7%
1950	820		−3.1%
1960	838		2.2%
1970	951		13.5%
1980	1,380		45.1%
1990	1,301		−5.7%
2000	1,411		8.5%
2010	1,502		6.4%
2020	1,471		−2.1%

=== 2020 census ===
Graysville racial composition
Race	Number	Percentage
White (non-Hispanic)	1,286	87.42%
Black or African American (non-Hispanic)	14	0.95%
Native American	9	0.61%
Asian	5	0.34%
Other/Mixed	77	5.23%
Hispanic or Latino	80	5.44%

As of the 2020 United States census, there were 1,471 people, 669 households, and 428 families residing in the town.

=== 2000 census ===
As of the census of 2000, there were 1,411 people, 551 households, and 400 families residing in the town. The population density was 1,745.1 inhabitants per square mile (673.8/km^{2}). There were 610 housing units at an average density of 754.4 units per square mile (291.3 units/km^{2}). The racial makeup of the town was 97.24% White, 0.64% African American, 0.21% Native American, 0.07% Pacific Islander, 0.57% from other races, and 1.28% from two or more races. Hispanic or Latino of any race were 1.49% of the population.

There were 551 households, out of which 36.7% had children under the age of 18 living with them, 50.1% were married couples living together, 17.8% had a female householder with no husband present, and 27.4% were non-families. 23.4% of all households were made up of individuals, and 9.6% had someone living alone who was 65 years of age or older. The average household size was 2.56 and the average family size was 3.01.

In the town, the population was spread out, with 27.1% under the age of 18, 9.6% from 18 to 24, 31.3% from 25 to 44, 22.0% from 45 to 64, and 10.1% who were 65 years of age or older. The median age was 34 years. For every 100 females, there were 85.7 males. For every 100 females age 18 and over, there were 81.2 males.

The median income for a household in the town was $28,370, and the median income for a family was $32,163. Males had a median income of $28,810 versus $20,885 for females. The per capita income for the town was $12,244. About 13.5% of families and 17.1% of the population were below the poverty line, including 22.3% of those under age 18 and 16.0% of those age 65 or over.

== Education ==
Rhea County Schools is the local school district. Graysville Elementary School is in the community, though it has a Dayton address. The district's sole high school is Rhea County High School.
