= Bryan College =

Christian college in Dayton, Tennessee, US

- Former names: William Jennings Bryan University (1930–1958); William Jennings Bryan College (1958–1993)
- Motto: "Christ Above All"
- Type: Private college
- Established: 1930; 96 years ago
- Religious affiliation: Christian
- Academic affiliations: Appalachian College Association, Association of Christian Schools International, Council for Christian Colleges and Universities
- Endowment: $11.4 million (2024)
- President: Douglas F. Mann
- Faculty: 164 (42 full-time)
- Administrative staff: 169 (131 full-time)
- Students: 1,656
- Postgraduates: 174
- Other students: 840
- Location: Dayton, Tennessee, United States; 35.4976°N 84.9991°W
- Campus: Small town
- Colors: Red, Gold & White
- Nickname: Lions
- Sporting affiliations: NAIA – Appalachian
- Mascot: Lion
- Website: bryan.edu/
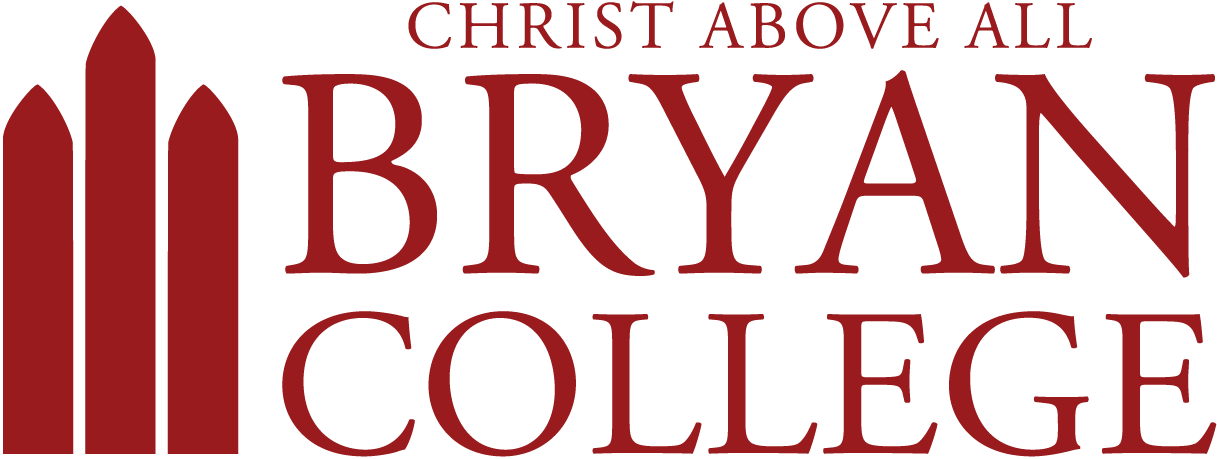

Bryan College is a private Christian college in Dayton, Tennessee, United States. It was founded in the aftermath of the 1925 Scopes trial to establish an institution of higher education that would teach from a Christian worldview.

== History ==
During the Scopes trial in 1925, William Jennings Bryan expressed the wish that a school might be established in Dayton, Tennessee, "to teach truth from a Biblical perspective". On July 26, 1925, he died in his sleep in Dayton, five days after the trial ended. Following his death, a national memorial association was formed to establish such an institution in Bryan's honor.

"William Jennings Bryan University" was chartered in 1930. Its stated purpose was to provide "for the purpose of establishing, conducting, and perpetuating a university for the higher education of men and women under auspices distinctly Christian and spiritual, as a testimony to the supreme glory of the Lord Jesus Christ, and to the Divine inspiration and infallibility of the Bible," In 1958, it was designated William Jennings Bryan College, and the name was shortened to "Bryan College" in 1993.

=== Presidents ===
- George E. Guille (1930–1931)
- Malcolm M. Lockhart (1931–1933)
- Judson A. Rudd (1933–1955)
- Theodore C. Mercer (1956–1986)
- Kenneth G. Hanna (1986–1992)
- William E. Brown (1993–2003)
- Stephen D. Livesay (2003–2020)
- Douglas Mann (2020–present)

== Academics ==
Bryan offers associate degrees, bachelor's degrees in 50+ fields of study, master's degrees, and a Doctorate of Business Administration.

The Adult and Graduate Studies programs are designed for adult learners to attend school part-time. Students can earn degrees online and onsite, and options include associate, bachelor's, and master's degrees.

In February 2018, Bryan College announced the opening of the Vogel School of Engineering, enabling students to obtain an undergraduate degree in mechanical or civil engineering.

In 2021, Bryan College founded the Clara Ward School of Nursing.

=== Accreditation and ranking ===
Bryan has been accredited by the Southern Association of Colleges and Schools since 1969.

Bryan ranks 71st in the U.S. News & World Report for Regional Universities in the South as of the 2019 rankings. In 2015, the college ranked 22nd and was formerly ranked fourth among the "Up and Coming" institutions in its category by the same publisher in 2012.

=== Affiliations ===
Bryan College is a member of the Tennessee Independent Colleges and Universities Association, the Council for Higher Education Accreditation, the Appalachian College Association, and the Association of Christian Schools International.

== Statement of belief and academic freedom ==
In February 2014, college administrators supplemented the original statement of belief, which is included in the employment contract of professors, with the declaration that Adam and Eve "are historical persons created by God in a special formative act, and not from previously existing life forms." Hundreds of students, including the vice president of student government, opposed the change. They petitioned trustees, and several professors left the institution.

The same month, the faculty voted 30–2 "no confidence" in the college president, Stephen Livesay.

Two tenured faculty had their contracts terminated after refusing to agree to the revised statement of belief, and filed a lawsuit against the college in May 2014. The college settled out of court in October 2014.

The college cut 20 staff members in May 2014, claiming dwindling enrollment. Two months later, five members of the board of trustees resigned in response to the controversy. The following year, Livesay instituted procedural rules that faculty members claimed made it extremely difficult for them to hold meetings.

== Campus ==
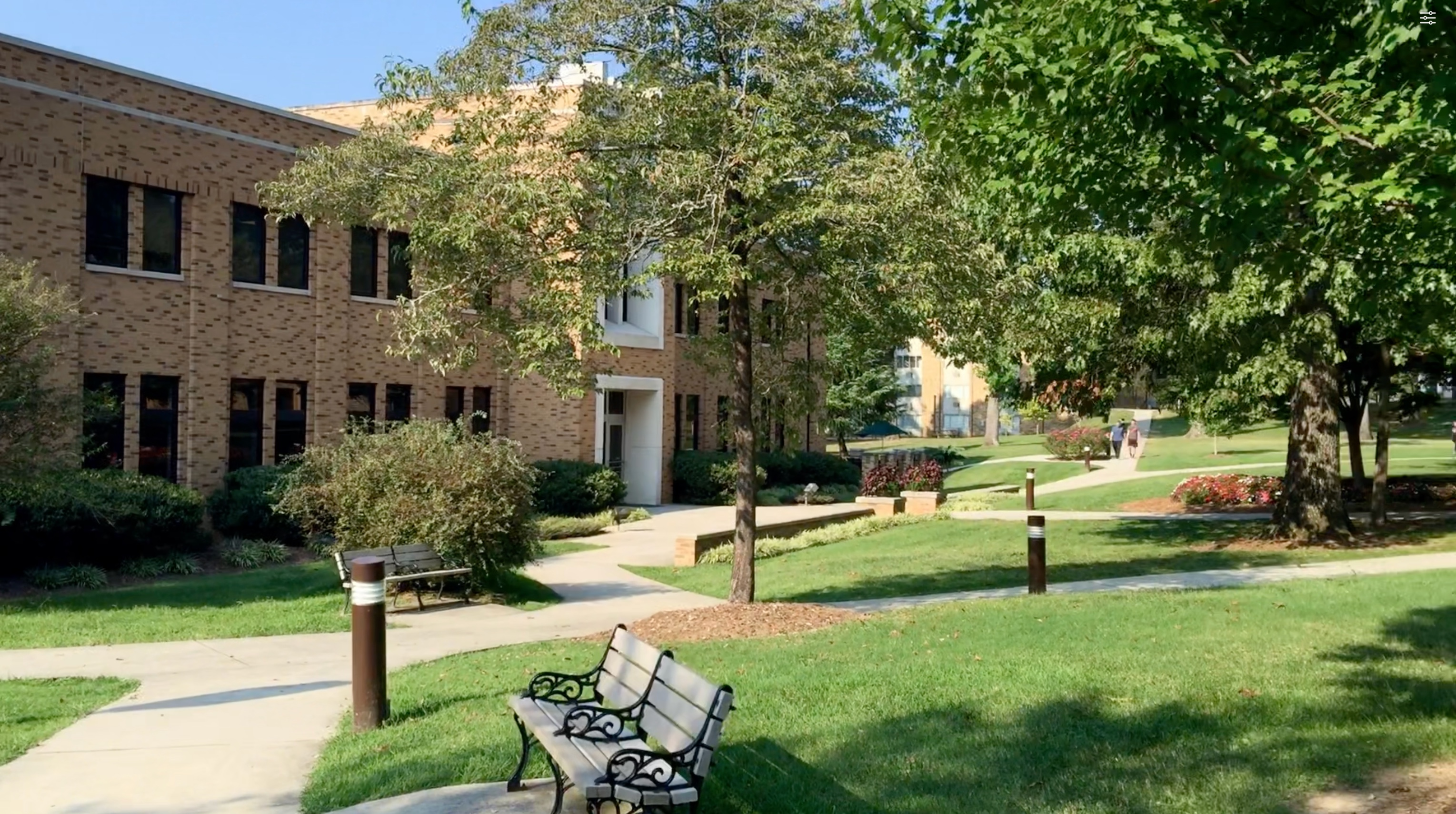
The Bryan College campus in Dayton, Tennessee, on Sept. 3, 2015

The Bryan College campus is located in Dayton, Tennessee, on a 128-acre (52 ha) hilltop. The campus is within walking distance of downtown Dayton and the historic Rhea County Courthouse.

Bryan College's campus consists of six public buildings, five residence halls, and 12 townhouses.

In the fall of 2000, the administration building was greatly damaged by a fire that spread to its third floor, but has since been repaired.

Its association with the Scopes trial has led to its addition as a stop along the Southeast Tennessee Religious Trail.

As of 2019, Bryan College has an on-campus physical therapy clinic.

== Athletics ==
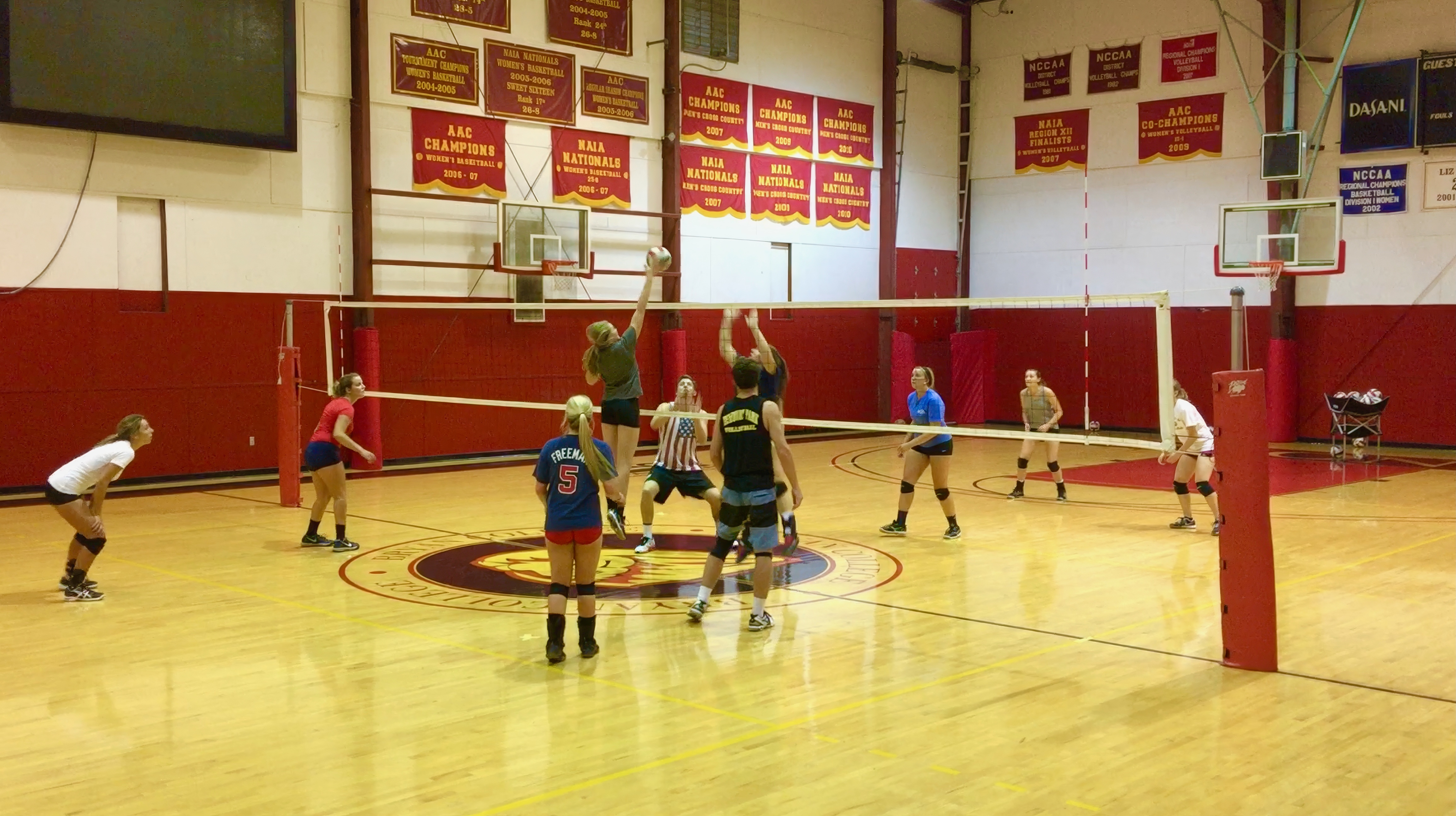
Bryan College students play volleyball in Summers Gymnasium

The Bryan athletic teams are called the Lions. The college is a member of the National Association of Intercollegiate Athletics, primarily competing in the Appalachian Athletic Conference since the 2001–02 academic year. They were also a member of the National Christian College Athletic Association, primarily competing as an independent in the Mid-East Region of the Division I level.

Bryan competes in 17 intercollegiate varsity sports: Men's sports include baseball, basketball, cross country, golf, soccer, and track and field; women's sports include basketball, cross-country, golf, soccer, softball, track and field, and volleyball; and co-ed sports include cheerleading, fishing, pickleball, martial arts and shooting.

== Publications ==
Bryan Life, the college's alumni magazine, is published twice a year. The Triangle is a bi-weekly student newspaper containing articles and stories written by Bryan College students. It also includes stats and updates on the college's sports teams. It is available electronically. In 2012, President Stephen Livesay prevented a student news story from being run, which revealed the coverup of the arrest of a faculty member. In 2015, the Vice President of Academics imposed censorship restrictions on the Triangle. Students are required to get approval from the current faculty advisor in order to run any stories.

== Notable alumni ==
- David Alward – Canadian politician
- Robert Clouse – religious studies scholar
- Rachel Held Evans – author
- David C. Fisher – Bible scholar, pastor
- Howard Clark Kee – Bible scholar
- George D. Miller – former president of Davis College
- Greg Martin – politician
