= Evensville, Tennessee =

- Unincorporated community
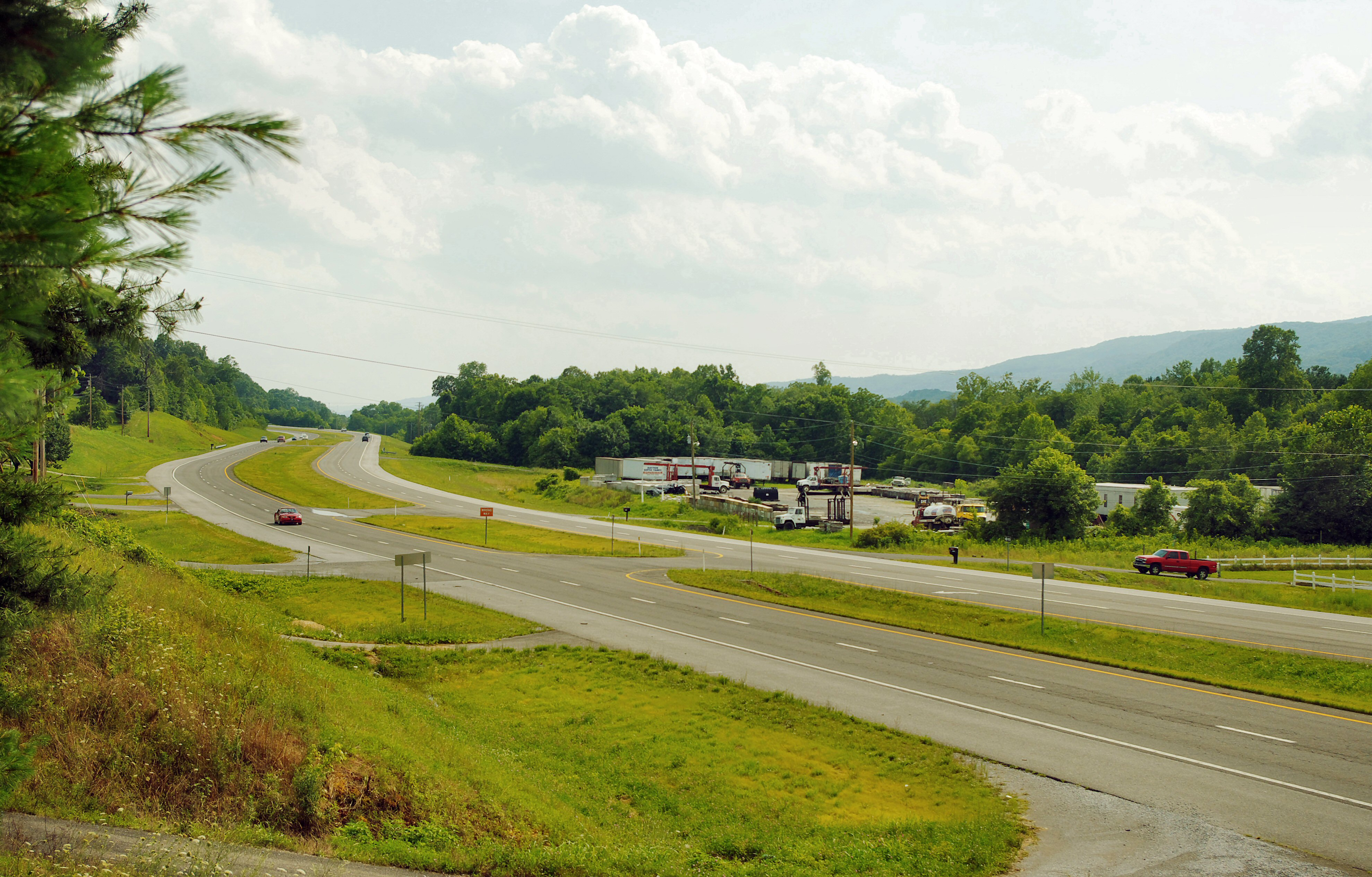
- US-27 in Evensville

- Location within Tennessee Location within the United States
- Coordinates: 35°33′52″N 84°57′17″W
- Country: United States
- State: Tennessee
- County: Rhea
- Elevation: 768 ft (234 m)
- Time zone: UTC-5 (Eastern (EST))
  - Summer (DST): UTC-4 (EDT)
- ZIP code: 37332
- Area code: 423
- GNIS feature ID: 1283918

Evensville is an unincorporated community in Rhea County, Tennessee, United States. In 2020 the population was 2,624. Evensville is located along U.S. Route 27 5.8 miles (9.3 km) northeast of Dayton. Evensville has a post office with ZIP code 37332. Rhea County High School and the Rhea County Middle School is located in Evensville.

== History ==
The community is believed to have been named for an early settler, Evan Evens, Jr. (1790-1825), or his son, Joseph Smith Evens, or grandson John Haws Evens, the first postmaster. Evensville was known as Darwin until 1878. .

== Education ==
Rhea County Schools is the local school district. It operates two public schools in Evensville: Rhea County Middle School and Rhea County High School.
