= Spring City, Tennessee =

- Town
- Town of Spring City
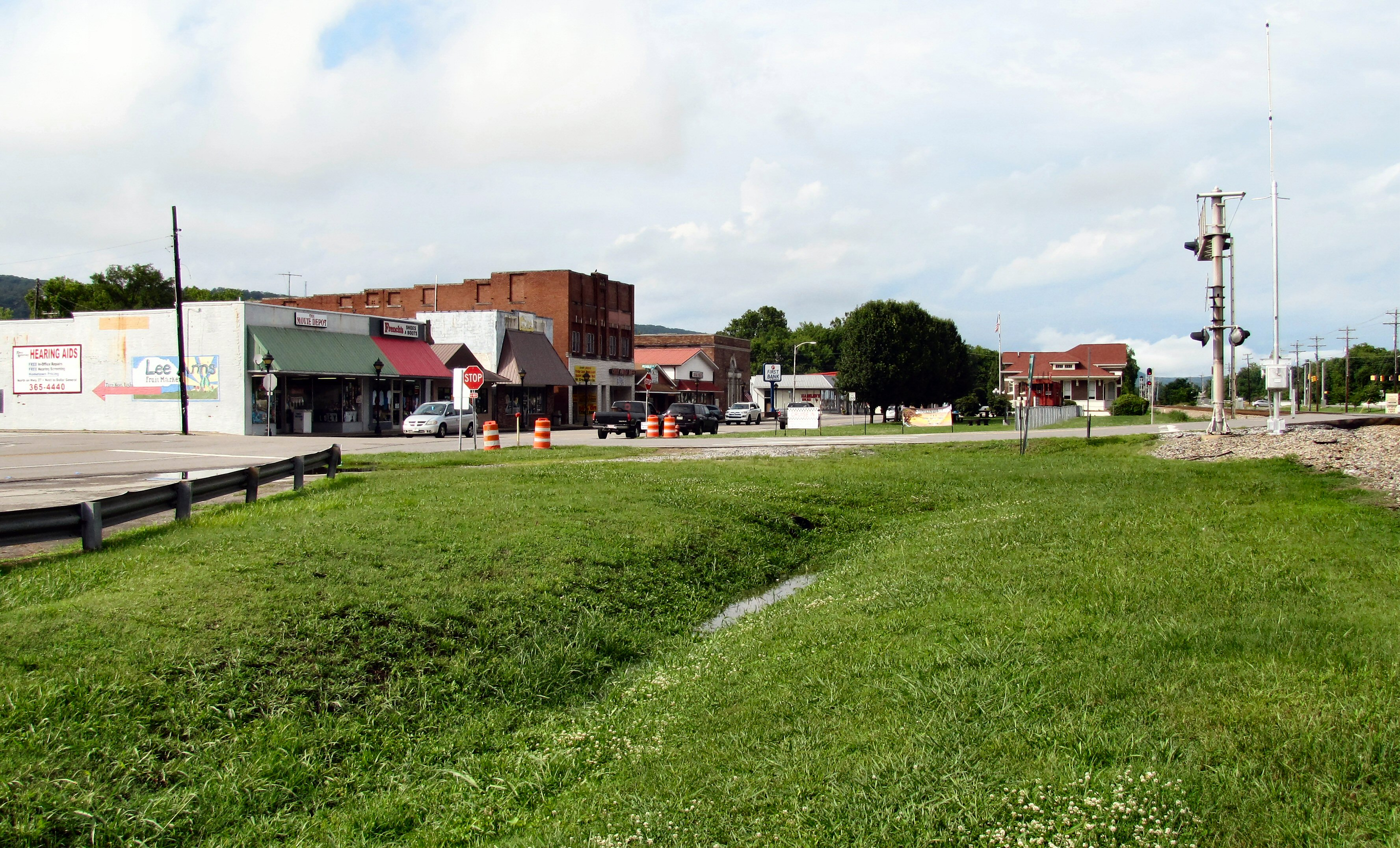

- Location of Spring City in Rhea County, Tennessee.
- Coordinates: 35°41′22″N 84°51′50″W
- Country: United States
- State: Tennessee
- County: Rhea

Area
  - Total: 2.80 sq mi (7.25 km^{2})
  - Land: 2.76 sq mi (7.16 km^{2})
  - Water: 0.035 sq mi (0.09 km^{2})
- Elevation: 768 ft (234 m)

Population (2020)
  - Total: 1,949
  - Density: 705.2/sq mi (272.27/km^{2})
- Time zone: UTC-5 (Eastern (EST))
  - Summer (DST): UTC-4 (EDT)
- ZIP codes: 37337, 37381
- Area code: 423
- FIPS code: 47-70400
- GNIS feature ID: 1303755
- Website: www.townofspringcitytn.com

Spring City is a town in Rhea County, Tennessee, United States. The population was 1,949 at the 2020 census and 1,981 at the 2010 census. The town is located along Watts Bar Lake, and Watts Bar Dam and the Watts Bar Nuclear Generating Station are nearby.

== History ==
Spring City began as a stop along the Cincinnati Southern Railroad in the 1870s. The town was originally named Sulphur Springs, because of the mass amount of sulphur in the water. Sometime later it became "Rheaville," and later became incorporated with nearby Rhea Springs, and took on the name Rhea Springs. Due to an explosion, much of the town flooded or burnt, and the town relocated to its current location and was renamed Spring City, in honor of the original settlement, Sulphur Springs. The original location now lies at the bottom of a nearby section of Watts Bar Lake. Spring City thrived as a railroad shipping hub during the late 19th and early 20th centuries. Its first railroad depot, a simple wooden building constructed in 1879, burned in 1892, and was replaced by a larger one. This second depot was in turn replaced by the current depot, which was completed by the Southern Railway in 1909.

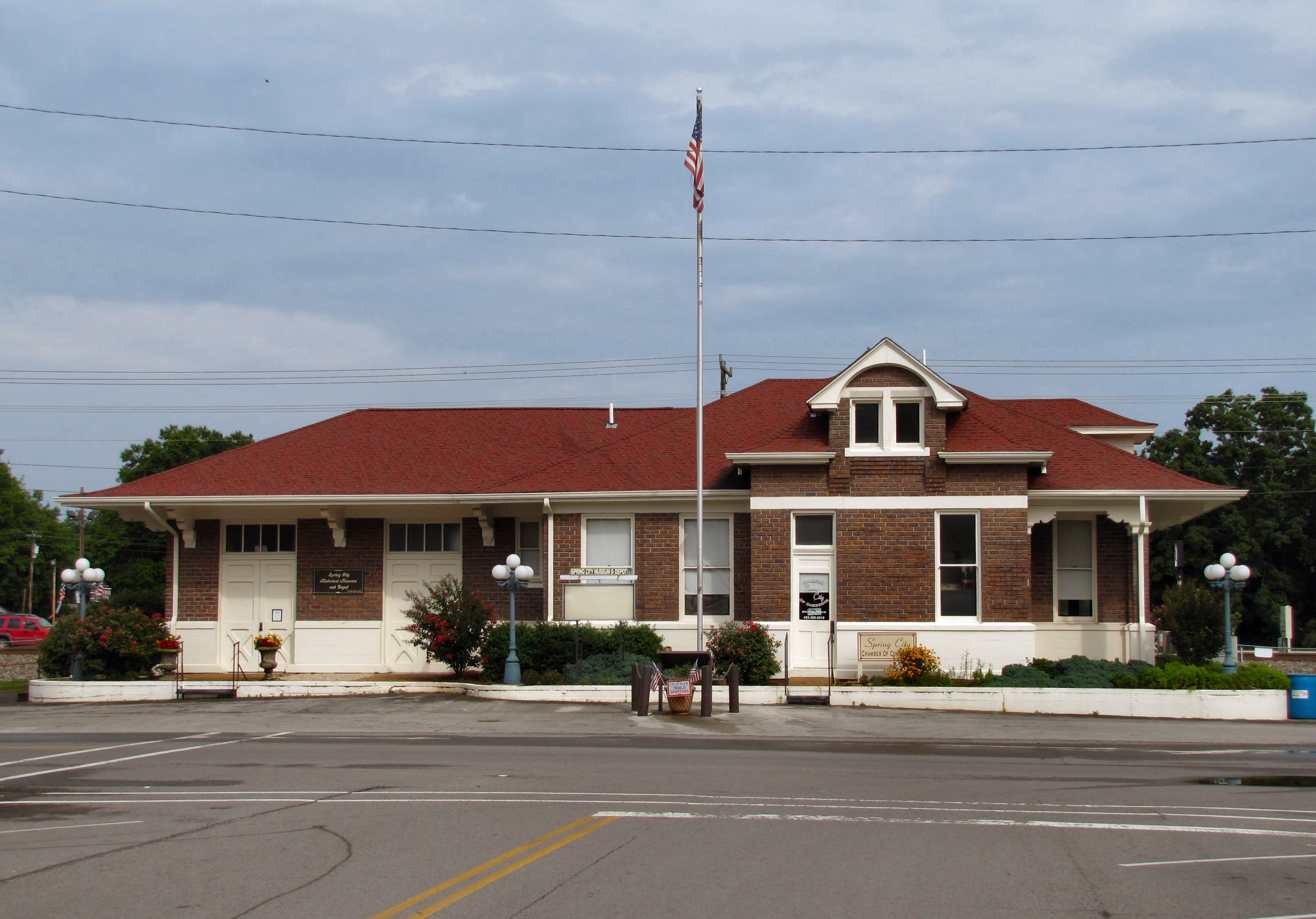
Spring City Depot, completed in 1909

The city received an economic boost in 1942 with the Tennessee Valley Authority's completion of Watts Bar Dam and its associated reservoir southeast of the town. That same year saw the completion of the Watts Bar Fossil Plant, TVA's first coal-fired plant. In 1973, TVA began building Watts Bar Nuclear Plant. Its first reactor, Watts Bar Unit 1, became active in 1996. The construction of the second reactor, Watts Bar Unit 2, was originally suspended in 1985, but resumed in 2007. It entered commercial operation in October 2016.

On August 22, 1955, 11 schoolchildren were killed, and many others injured, when their school bus was struck by a 103-car freight train at a track crossing in Spring City.

On July 28, 2016, a train hauling coal derailed by the train depot and museum due to a faulty wheel on one of the privately owned coal cars. There were no casualties. A lengthy cleanup followed, where both track crossings in town had to be closed while repairs were made and debris cleared.

== Geography ==
Spring City is located at 35°41′22″N 84°51′50″W (35.689422, -84.863885).

According to the United States Census Bureau, the town has a total area of 2.5 square miles (6.5 km^{2}), of which, 2.4 square miles (6.2 km^{2}) of it is land and 0.04 square miles (0.10 km^{2}) of it (1.21%) is water.

=== Climate ===
Climate data for Spring City, Tennessee, 1991–2020 normals, extremes 2003–present
Month	Jan	Feb	Mar	Apr	May	Jun	Jul	Aug	Sep	Oct	Nov	Dec	Year
Record high °F (°C)	75 (24)	81 (27)	85 (29)	88 (31)	92 (33)	103 (39)	104 (40)	103 (39)	96 (36)	96 (36)	85 (29)	76 (24)	104 (40)
Mean maximum °F (°C)	65.7 (18.7)	71.1 (21.7)	79.5 (26.4)	84.5 (29.2)	87.3 (30.7)	92.5 (33.6)	94.1 (34.5)	94.0 (34.4)	90.5 (32.5)	84.3 (29.1)	73.4 (23.0)	67.9 (19.9)	95.8 (35.4)
Mean daily maximum °F (°C)	47.5 (8.6)	51.7 (10.9)	60.4 (15.8)	70.6 (21.4)	77.2 (25.1)	83.9 (28.8)	86.9 (30.5)	86.7 (30.4)	81.0 (27.2)	70.8 (21.6)	58.8 (14.9)	50.3 (10.2)	68.8 (20.5)
Daily mean °F (°C)	36.9 (2.7)	40.5 (4.7)	47.8 (8.8)	57.0 (13.9)	65.3 (18.5)	73.0 (22.8)	76.7 (24.8)	75.9 (24.4)	69.7 (20.9)	58.2 (14.6)	46.8 (8.2)	39.9 (4.4)	57.3 (14.1)
Mean daily minimum °F (°C)	26.2 (−3.2)	29.2 (−1.6)	35.2 (1.8)	43.5 (6.4)	53.5 (11.9)	62.2 (16.8)	66.5 (19.2)	65.2 (18.4)	58.4 (14.7)	45.5 (7.5)	34.8 (1.6)	29.5 (−1.4)	45.8 (7.7)
Mean minimum °F (°C)	9.9 (−12.3)	14.9 (−9.5)	20.0 (−6.7)	29.2 (−1.6)	37.1 (2.8)	53.0 (11.7)	58.2 (14.6)	57.3 (14.1)	46.5 (8.1)	31.0 (−0.6)	21.3 (−5.9)	16.8 (−8.4)	8.1 (−13.3)
Record low °F (°C)	−5 (−21)	0 (−18)	15 (−9)	20 (−7)	24 (−4)	47 (8)	51 (11)	47 (8)	40 (4)	25 (−4)	12 (−11)	3 (−16)	−5 (−21)
Average precipitation inches (mm)	5.71 (145)	5.24 (133)	5.46 (139)	5.60 (142)	4.13 (105)	5.06 (129)	5.61 (142)	3.07 (78)	4.77 (121)	3.63 (92)	5.11 (130)	6.01 (153)	59.40 (1,509)
Average snowfall inches (cm)	0.4 (1.0)	0.7 (1.8)	0.1 (0.25)	0.0 (0.0)	0.0 (0.0)	0.0 (0.0)	0.0 (0.0)	0.0 (0.0)	0.0 (0.0)	0.0 (0.0)	0.0 (0.0)	0.1 (0.25)	1.3 (3.3)
Average precipitation days (≥ 0.01 in)	11.5	12.6	10.6	10.1	11.4	11.3	13.1	9.6	7.9	8.2	8.9	11.9	127.1
Average snowy days (≥ 0.1 in)	0.5	0.5	0.1	0.0	0.0	0.0	0.0	0.0	0.0	0.0	0.0	0.2	1.3
Source 1: NOAA
Source 2: National Weather Service (mean maxima/minima 2006–2020)

== Demographics ==
Historical population
Census	Pop.	Note	%±
1890	598		—
1900	640		7.0%
1910	1,039		62.3%
1920	1,001		−3.7%
1930	1,090		8.9%
1940	1,569		43.9%
1950	1,725		9.9%
1960	1,800		4.3%
1970	1,756		−2.4%
1980	1,951		11.1%
1990	2,199		12.7%
2000	2,025		−7.9%
2010	1,981		−2.2%
2020	1,949		−1.6%

=== 2020 census ===
Spring City racial composition
Race	Number	Percentage
White (non-Hispanic)	1,745	89.53%
Black or African American (non-Hispanic)	53	2.72%
Native American	5	0.26%
Asian	13	0.67%
Other/Mixed	80	4.1%
Hispanic or Latino	53	2.72%

As of the 2020 United States census, there were 1,949 people, 935 households, and 537 families residing in the town.

=== 2000 census ===
As of the census of 2000, there were 2,025 people, 861 households, and 533 families residing in the town. The population density was 829.9 inhabitants per square mile (320.4/km^{2}). There were 974 housing units at an average density of 399.2 units per square mile (154.1 units/km^{2}). The racial makeup of the town was 94.52% White, 4.49% African American, 0.40% Native American, 0.05% Asian, and 0.54% from two or more races. Hispanic or Latino of any race were 0.49% of the population.

There were 861 households, out of which 24.7% had children under the age of 18 living with them, 44.9% were married couples living together, 12.7% had a female householder with no husband present, and 38.0% were non-families. 33.8% of all households were made up of individuals, and 17.8% had someone living alone who was 65 years of age or older. The average household size was 2.21 and the average family size was 2.83.

In the town, the population was spread out, with 20.4% under the age of 18, 7.4% from 18 to 24, 23.9% from 25 to 44, 23.5% from 45 to 64, and 24.9% who were 65 years of age or older. The median age was 44 years. For every 100 females, there were 86.0 males. For every 100 females age 18 and over, there were 81.1 males.

The median income for a household in the town was $27,009, and the median income for a family was $31,894. Males had a median income of $27,692 versus $22,050 for females. The per capita income for the town was $14,506. About 15.5% of families and 21.0% of the population were below the poverty line, including 32.7% of those under age 18 and 18.8% of those age 65 or over.

View of Watts Bar Lake

== Education ==
Rhea County Schools is the local school district. The elementary and middle schools are Spring City Elementary School and Spring City Middle School. The district's sole high school is Rhea County High School.
