= Rhea County Schools =

School district in Tennessee, United States

Rhea County School District

Location
- 1385 Broadway Street; Dayton, Tennessee 37321 Rhea County, Tennessee

District information
- Type: Public school district
- Motto: Every Child, Every Chance, Every Day
- Grades: K-12
- Director of Schools: Dr. Amie Lonas
- Chair of the board: Janie Graham
- Schools: 8

Students and staff
- Students: 3,793

Other information
- Website: www.rheacounty.org

Rhea County Department of Education, also known as Rhea County Schools or Rhea School District, is a school district headquartered in Dayton, Tennessee. It serves students in the county, except for the City of Dayton, for elementary and middle school, as well as high school students throughout the entire county.

== Schools ==
Secondary schools:

- Rhea County High School - Evensville (Unincorporated area)
- Rhea County Middle School - Evensville
- Spring City Middle School - Spring City

Elementary schools:

- Frazier Elementary School - Unincorporated area near Dayton
- Graysville Elementary School - Graysville
- Rhea Central Elementary School - Unincorporated area near Dayton
- Spring City Elementary School - Spring City

== See also ==
- Dayton City School - The municipal school district and school for the City of Dayton, covering elementary and middle school
