= Rhea County High School =

Location
- 885 Eagle Lane; Evensville, Tennessee 37332; United States

Information
- School type: Public secondary
- Motto: "Every Child, Every Chance, Every Day"
- Established: 1974
- School district: Rhea County School System.
- Principal: Ansley Massengill
- Teaching staff: 89.08 (FTE)
- Grades: 9-12
- Enrollment: 1,389 (2023-2024)
- Student to teacher ratio: 15.59
- Colors: Green and gold
- Athletics conference: TSSAA
- Mascot: Golden eagle
- Newspaper: "The Eagle's Nest"
- Yearbook: "The Aerie"
- Graduates (2010): 149

Rhea County High School is a high school in Evensville, Tennessee. It serves Rhea County, Tennessee, which includes Dayton, Spring City and Graysville. It has an enrollment of 1,469. Its mascot is a golden eagle. It is a part of Rhea County Schools.

== History ==
In 2013, Rhea County High School celebrated their 40th year since the school was established and Spring City and Rhea Central were brought together to form what is now well known as Rhea County High School. Also in 2013, following the 40th year celebration of the school, was the building of a new addition that spanned to cover 320,000 square feet. When this switch occurred, the middle school of Rhea County moved into the old high school so that they could have a larger space as well. With the building of the new wing came an addition to the athletic/physical health department by the addition of 3 new gyms, a brand new turf football/soccer field, and a track outlying the layout of the regulation size field.

== Athletics ==
Rhea County High School offers 14 different sports for both ladies and men at their school.

== Notable alumni ==
- David Douglas, NFL player
- Rachel Held Evans, writer
- Andy Kelly, Arena Football League quarterback
- Cory Gearrin, Major League Baseball relief pitcher
- Dave Roller, former NFL defensive tackle
- Josh Walker, NFL player

== See also ==
- Rhea County Schools - the district the school lies in
- John T. Scopes - Prominent figure in the Scopes trial, which involved the teaching of evolution in schools
