= Dayton, Tennessee =

- City
- Location of Dayton in Rhea County, Tennessee.
- Coordinates: 35°30′N 85°1′W
- Country: United States
- State: Tennessee
- County: Rhea
- Settled: ca. 1820
- Incorporated: 1903
- Named for: Dayton, Ohio

Area
  - Total: 8.74 sq mi (22.64 km^{2})
  - Land: 8.50 sq mi (22.02 km^{2})
  - Water: 0.24 sq mi (0.61 km^{2})
- Elevation: 696 ft (212 m)

Population (2020)
  - Total: 7,065
  - Density: 830.8/sq mi (320.78/km^{2})
- Time zone: UTC−5 (Eastern (EST))
  - Summer (DST): UTC−4 (EDT)
- ZIP code: 37321
- Area code: 423
- FIPS code: 47-19700
- GNIS feature ID: 1306293
- Website: www.daytontn.net

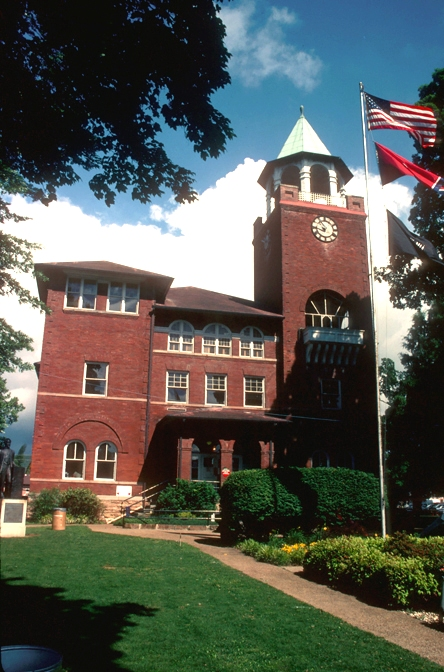
The Rhea County courthouse is home of the famous Scopes trial.

Dayton is a city in and the county seat of Rhea County, Tennessee, United States. As of the 2020 census, the city population was 7,065. The Dayton Urban Cluster includes developed areas adjacent to the city and extends south to Graysville.

Dayton was the site of the Scopes trial in 1925 dealing with the rejection of evolution by religious groups.

== History ==
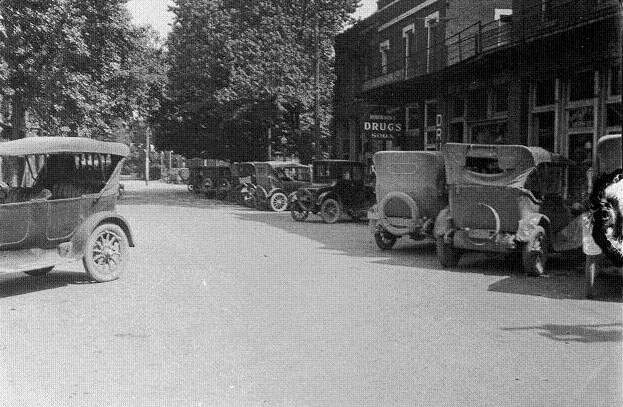
Downtown Dayton in 1925

The community was originally settled circa 1820 as Smith's Crossroads. In 1877, the town was renamed Dayton, after Dayton, Ohio. The town was incorporated in 1903. Early industry included manufacture of pig iron.

=== Scopes trial ===
In 1925, the famous Scopes trial was held in Dayton and, for a period of time, filled the town with hucksters of every description and journalists from around the world. The participants included William Jennings Bryan in the role of prosecutor and Clarence Darrow as the principal defense counsel. The trial was over the issue of whether evolution should be taught in public schools. John T. Scopes, the defendant in the trial, was a local science teacher who was recruited by George Rappleyea to begin to teach evolution in his science class, and at the provocation of the ACLU (American Civil Liberties Union), despite it being against Tennessee law at that time. Rappleyea believed that this conflict would create an enormous amount of publicity for the town, and he was proven correct. The town bustled with activity as people began to flock from near and far to hear the verdict on this controversial issue.

Although this trial is often represented as being pivotal in the movement to allow evolution to be taught in American schools, it actually marked the beginning of a major decline in the teaching of evolution which did not start to recover until the early 1960s. Likewise, the Butler Act, which Scopes was supposed to have violated—though it was never invoked again—remained on the books until 1967, when it was repealed by the Tennessee Legislature.

H. L. Mencken famously covered the trial for The Baltimore Sun and recruited Clarence Darrow to lead the defense team.

Immediately after the trial, Bryan continued to edit and deliver speeches, traveling hundreds of miles that week. On July 26, 1925, he drove from Chattanooga to Dayton to attend a church service, ate a meal, and died (the result of diabetes and fatigue) in his sleep that afternoon—just five days after the Scopes trial ended.

== Geography ==
Dayton is located at 35°30′N 85°1′W (35.493, -85.013). According to the United States Census Bureau, the city has a total area of 6.4 square miles (17 km^{2}), of which 6.1 square miles (16 km^{2}) is land and 0.2 square miles (0.52 km^{2}) (3.62%) is water.

=== Climate ===
Dayton has a humid subtropical climate with four distinct seasons; hot and humid in the summer, warm and mild in spring and fall, and cool in winter with some snow.

Climate data for Dayton 2 SE, Tennessee (1991–2020 normals, extremes 1956–present)
Month	Jan	Feb	Mar	Apr	May	Jun	Jul	Aug	Sep	Oct	Nov	Dec	Year
Record high °F (°C)	75 (24)	80 (27)	85 (29)	92 (33)	94 (34)	103 (39)	107 (42)	104 (40)	100 (38)	97 (36)	84 (29)	76 (24)	107 (42)
Mean maximum °F (°C)	65.7 (18.7)	70.4 (21.3)	77.7 (25.4)	84.4 (29.1)	87.5 (30.8)	92.3 (33.5)	94.5 (34.7)	94.2 (34.6)	91.0 (32.8)	83.1 (28.4)	74.4 (23.6)	66.6 (19.2)	96.0 (35.6)
Mean daily maximum °F (°C)	47.4 (8.6)	52.0 (11.1)	60.9 (16.1)	70.5 (21.4)	78.0 (25.6)	84.7 (29.3)	87.6 (30.9)	87.4 (30.8)	82.1 (27.8)	71.2 (21.8)	59.4 (15.2)	50.3 (10.2)	69.3 (20.7)
Daily mean °F (°C)	37.8 (3.2)	41.7 (5.4)	49.2 (9.6)	58.3 (14.6)	66.5 (19.2)	74.0 (23.3)	77.3 (25.2)	76.7 (24.8)	70.8 (21.6)	59.3 (15.2)	48.2 (9.0)	40.8 (4.9)	58.4 (14.7)
Mean daily minimum °F (°C)	28.3 (−2.1)	31.4 (−0.3)	37.6 (3.1)	46.1 (7.8)	55.0 (12.8)	63.4 (17.4)	67.0 (19.4)	65.9 (18.8)	59.6 (15.3)	47.5 (8.6)	37.0 (2.8)	31.3 (−0.4)	47.5 (8.6)
Mean minimum °F (°C)	11.4 (−11.4)	15.8 (−9.0)	22.6 (−5.2)	31.4 (−0.3)	40.2 (4.6)	53.5 (11.9)	60.2 (15.7)	59.1 (15.1)	46.5 (8.1)	32.4 (0.2)	23.7 (−4.6)	17.9 (−7.8)	8.7 (−12.9)
Record low °F (°C)	−15 (−26)	−4 (−20)	3 (−16)	22 (−6)	30 (−1)	40 (4)	49 (9)	49 (9)	30 (−1)	23 (−5)	9 (−13)	−5 (−21)	−15 (−26)
Average precipitation inches (mm)	5.21 (132)	5.09 (129)	5.33 (135)	5.38 (137)	4.79 (122)	4.50 (114)	5.29 (134)	3.88 (99)	4.82 (122)	3.62 (92)	4.79 (122)	6.04 (153)	58.74 (1,492)
Average snowfall inches (cm)	0.3 (0.76)	0.6 (1.5)	0.4 (1.0)	0.0 (0.0)	0.0 (0.0)	0.0 (0.0)	0.0 (0.0)	0.0 (0.0)	0.0 (0.0)	0.0 (0.0)	0.0 (0.0)	0.3 (0.76)	1.6 (4.1)
Average precipitation days (≥ 0.01 in)	10.9	10.6	11.4	10.4	11.1	11.7	13.2	10.9	9.1	8.4	8.7	11.3	127.7
Average snowy days (≥ 0.1 in)	0.4	0.5	0.0	0.0	0.0	0.0	0.0	0.0	0.0	0.0	0.0	0.3	1.2
Source: NOAA

== Demographics ==
Historical population
Census	Pop.	Note	%±
1880	173		—
1890	926		435.3%
1900	1,189		28.4%
1910	1,991		67.5%
1920	1,701		−14.6%
1930	2,006		17.9%
1940	1,870		−6.8%
1950	3,191		70.6%
1960	3,500		9.7%
1970	4,361		24.6%
1980	5,233		20.0%
1990	5,671		8.4%
2000	7,923		39.7%
2010	7,528		−5.0%
2020	7,065		−6.2%

=== 2020 census ===
As of the 2020 census, Dayton had a population of 7,065 people living in 2,866 households, including 1,510 families.

The median age was 36.2 years, with 23.7% of residents under the age of 18 and 17.2% aged 65 years or older; for every 100 females there were 97.0 males and for every 100 females age 18 and over there were 95.8 males age 18 and over.

97.9% of residents lived in urban areas, while 2.1% lived in rural areas.

There were 2,866 households, of which 30.8% had children under 18 living in them, 39.1% were married-couple households, 21.0% were households with a male householder and no spouse or partner present, and 32.7% were households with a female householder and no spouse or partner present. About 32.3% of all households were made up of individuals and 14.6% had someone living alone who was 65 years of age or older.

There were 3,118 housing units, of which 8.1% were vacant. The homeowner vacancy rate was 1.1% and the rental vacancy rate was 7.1%.

Racial composition as of the 2020 census
Race	Number	Percent
White	5,784	81.9%
Black or African American	310	4.4%
American Indian and Alaska Native	46	0.7%
Asian	95	1.3%
Native Hawaiian and Other Pacific Islander	2	0.0%
Some other race	381	5.4%
Two or more races	447	6.3%
Hispanic or Latino (of any race)	615	8.7%

=== 2000 census ===
As of the census of 2000, there was a population of 6,180, with 2,323 households and 1,558 families residing in the city. The population density was 1,007.9 inhabitants per square mile (389.2/km^{2}). There were 2,492 housing units at an average density of 406.4 units per square mile (156.9 units/km^{2}). The racial makeup of the city was 90.7% White, 5.3% African American, 0.2% Native American, 0.7% Asian, <0.1% Pacific Islander, 1.8% from other races, and 1.3% from two or more races. Hispanic or Latino of any race were 3.1% of the population.

There were 2,323 households, out of which 31.5% had children under the age of 18 living with them, 47.7% were married couples living together, 15.3% had a female householder with no male present, and 32.9% were non-families. 29.2% of all households were made up of individuals, and 12.9% had someone living alone who was 65 years of age or older. The average household size was 2.40 and the average family size was 2.95.

In the city, the age distribution of the population shows 23.5% under the age of 18, 16.0% from 18 to 24, 25.4% from 25 to 44, 20.8% from 45 to 64, and 14.3% who were 65 years of age or older. The median age was 34 years. For every 100 females, there were 86.8 males. For every 100 females age 18 and over, there were 82.4 males.

The median income for a household in the city was $23,870, and the median income for a family was $32,149. Males had a median income of $28.765 versus $20,144 for females. The per capita income for the city was $12,946. About 13.4% of families and 32.9% of the population were below the poverty line, including 24.0% of those under age 18 and 16.6% of those age 65 or over.

== Economy ==
Dayton is a small manufacturing center whose products include furniture, clothing, automobile parts, and recreational vehicle components. La-Z-Boy is the largest manufacturing employer, followed by Suburban Manufacturing, Robinson Manufacturing, and International Automotive Components Group. Finland-based Nokian Tyres plans to employ around 400 at its new Dayton tire manufacturing factory which began initial operations in 2019. The Tennessee Valley Authority's Watts Bar and Sequoyah nuclear power plants are both within 20 miles (32 km) of the city. Since the late 1990s the area has experienced increased residential development particularly along Chickamauga Lake, an impoundment of the Tennessee River. More recently, Dayton has hosted several major bass fishing tournaments at Chickamauga Lake including the 2014 Bassmaster BASSfest, American Bass Anglers Weekend Series, Heartland Anglers Classic, the 2013 Walmart FLW Tour and various senior, collegiate and high school events.

In 2019, STULZ Air Technology Systems, an HVAC and cooling solutions manufacturer, opened a new facility in Dayton, adding over 250 new jobs.

== Education ==
Dayton is home to Bryan College, a four-year Christian liberal arts school named in honor of William Jennings Bryan, who died in Dayton five days after the Scopes Trial ended.

Dayton's also home to the Rhea County Higher Education Center, which is operated by Chattanooga State Community College and provides workforce training and duel enrollment programs.

Chattanooga State Community College operates a site in downtown Dayton with a variety of offerings including General Education core for most majors and selected career courses. A Welding Technology course is also offered as part of the TCAT program.

Dayton City School, a K-8 public school, is free for all residents of Dayton. Dayton residents attend Rhea County High School, operated by Rhea County Schools.

Rhea Central Elementary School, operated by the county school system and serving people not living in the city, is just outside the city limits and covers PK-5. Graysville Elementary School in Graysville also has a Dayton postal address. Rhea Central Elementary School serves the community of Browntown, which resides across from it, and the side of Dayton Mountain located in Rhea County (The county line lays near the Xanders Restaurant and Store and leads into Bledsoe County).

Omega Graduate School, an institution of Christian postgraduate education, is located in Dayton's Crystal Springs community.

== Notable people ==
- Howard Armstrong (March 4, 1909 – July 30, 2003) – African American string band (Tennessee Chocolate Drops) and country blues musician
- Joseph Aloysius Durick (October 13, 1914 – June 26, 1994) – U.S. Roman Catholic bishop and civil rights advocate
- Jake Gaither (April 11, 1903 – February 18, 1994) – Hall of Fame head football coach at Florida A&M University (FAMU) for 25 years; won six black national championships and amassed one of the highest winning percentages in collegiate history
- Russ Hodges (June 18, 1910 – April 19, 1971) – baseball broadcaster for New York and San Francisco Giants; best known for calling Bobby Thomson's famed 1951 Shot Heard 'Round the World
- Red Holt (July 25, 1894 – February 2, 1961) – former Major League Baseball first baseman with the Philadelphia Athletics
- Dave Roller – former NFL defensive lineman
- John Scopes (August 3, 1900 – October 21, 1970) – teacher charged with violating Tennessee's Butler Act and tried in a case popularly known as the Scopes Monkey Trial
- Rachel Held Evans (June 8, 1981 – May 4, 2019) – Columnist and New York Times Best Selling Author
- Cory Gearrin (April 14, 1986 – Present ) – Major League Baseball pitcher, currently a free agent, most recently with the Minnesota Twins
- Walter White - member of the Tennessee General Assembly
- R. E. Winsett (January 15, 1876 – June 26, 1952) – American composer and publisher of gospel music

== Works cited ==
- Cornwell, Ilene (1988). Biographical Directory of the Tennessee General Assembly Volume III: 1901-1931. Tennessee Historical Commission. ISBN 0874020085.
