= Tennessee State Route 327 =

State highway in Tennessee, United States

State Route 327
- Blair Road
- SR 327 highlighted in red

Route information
- Maintained by TDOT
- Length: 5.7 mi (9.2 km)
- Existed: July 1, 1983–present

Major junctions
- South end: SR 58 in Oak Ridge
- North end: SR 61 in Blair

Location
- Country: United States
- State: Tennessee
- Counties: Roane

Highway system
- Tennessee State Routes; Interstate; US; State
← SR 326	→ SR 328

State Route 327 (SR 327), also known as Blair Road, is a 5.7-mile-long (9.2 km) north–south state highway in Roane County, Tennessee. It serves as a connector between the towns of Oliver Springs and Harriman with the western end of the city of Oak Ridge.

== Route description ==
SR 327 begins in Oak Ridge at an intersection with SR 58. It goes north to pass by the historic George Jones Memorial Baptist Church and K-25 before crossing over Southern Appalachia Railway Museum's excursion railroad, to which it runs parallel to (and crosses several times) for the rest of its length, before crossing over Poplar Creek. The highway then passes by a substation before leaving Oak Ridge and paralleling Poplar Creek. SR 327 then crosses a couple of ridges and valleys, where it leaves Poplar Creek and has intersections with Poplar Creek Road, Old Harriman Highway, and Dyllis Road. The highway then passes through some mountainous terrain before crossing a Norfolk Southern railroad and coming to an end at an intersection with SR 61 in the community of Blair. The entire route of SR 327 is a two-lane highway.

== Major intersections ==
The entire route is in Roane County.

Location	mi	km	Destinations	Notes
Oak Ridge	0.0	0.0	SR 58 (Oak Ridge Turnpike) – Oak Ridge, Kingston	Southern terminus
Oak Ridge			Malcom P. Crews Memorial Bridge over Poplar Creek	
Blair	5.7	9.2	SR 61 (Harriman Highway) – Harriman, Oliver Springs	Northern terminus
1.000 mi = 1.609 km; 1.000 km = 0.621 mi
