= Tennessee State Route 326 =

State highway in Tennessee, United States

State Route 326
- Gallaher Road
- SR 326 highlighted in red

Route information
- Maintained by TDOT
- Length: 1.3 mi (2.1 km)
- Existed: July 1, 1983–present

Major junctions
- South end: US 70 near Kingston
- North end: I-40 / SR 58 in Kingston

Location
- Country: United States
- State: Tennessee
- Counties: Roane

Highway system
- Tennessee State Routes; Interstate; US; State
← SR 325	→ SR 327

State Route 326 (SR 326), also known as Gallaher Road, is a short 1.3-mile-long (2.1 km) state highway in Roane County, Tennessee. It connects U.S. Route 70 (US 70) with Interstate 40 (I-40) and, via SR 58, the city of Oak Ridge.

== Route description ==
SR 326 begins at an intersection with US 70/SR 1 east of downtown Kingston. It goes north through rural areas as a two-lane highway with a speed limit of 55 miles per hour (89 km/h). The highway then comes to an interchange with I-40 and SR 58 at the Kingston city limits (exit 356), where SR 326 ends and Gallaher Road continues north towards Oak Ridge as SR 58.

== Major intersections ==
The entire route is in Roane County.

Location	mi	km	Destinations	Notes
	0.0	0.0	US 70 (Kingston Highway/SR 1) – Kingston, Knoxville	Southern terminus
Kingston	1.3	2.1	I-40 / SR 58 south – Nashville, Kingston, Knoxville SR 58 north (Gallaher Road) – Oak Ridge	I-40 exit 356 eastbound, 356 A/B westbound; northern terminus; road continues north as SR 58 (Gallaher Road)
1.000 mi = 1.609 km; 1.000 km = 0.621 mi
