= George Jones Memorial Baptist Church =

Historic church in Tennessee, United States

- U.S. National Register of Historic Places
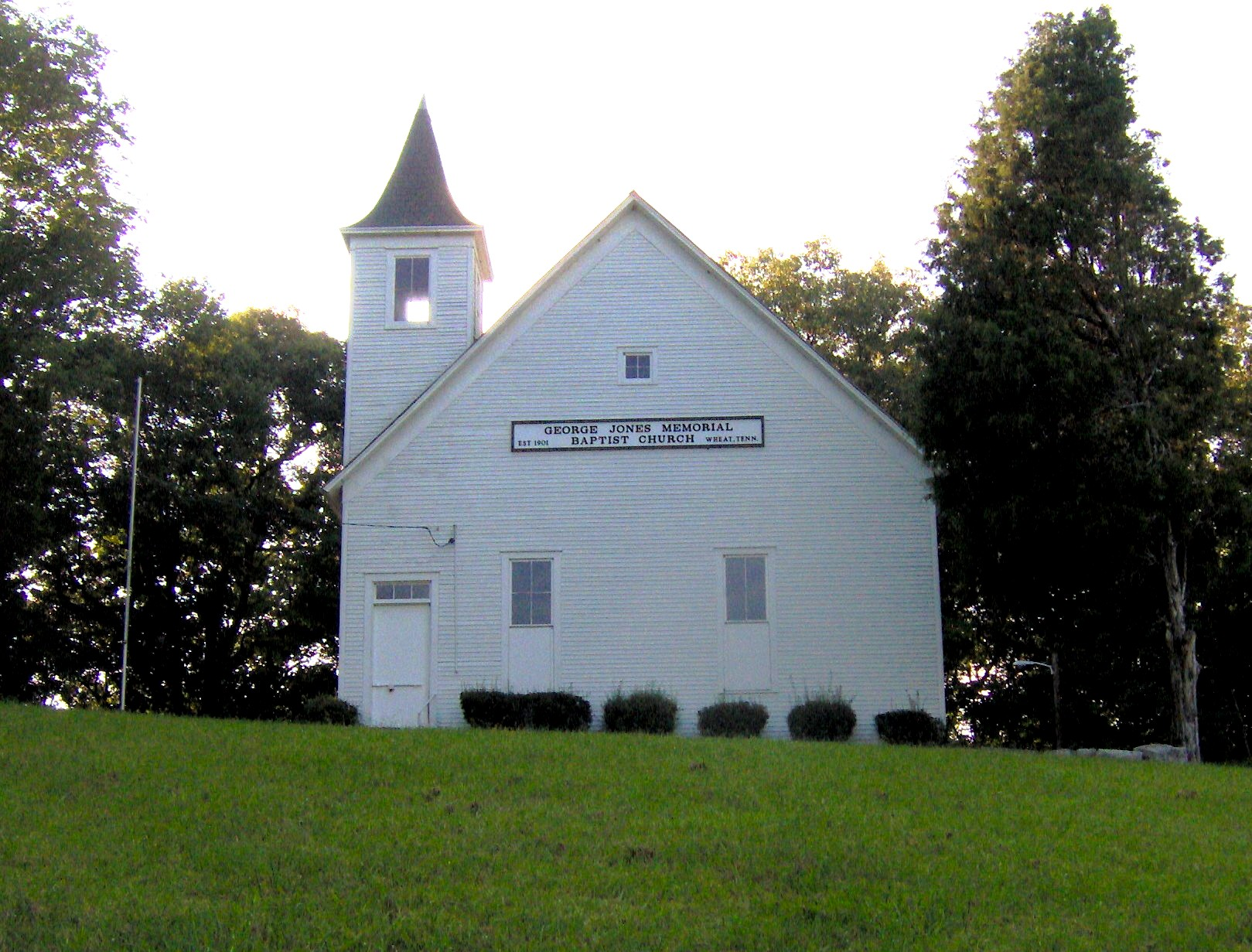
- Front of the church

- Location within Tennessee Location within the United States
- Location: Blair Rd., Oak Ridge, Tennessee
- Coordinates: 35°56′21″N 84°22′22″W
- Built: 1901
- MPS: Oak Ridge MPS
- NRHP reference No.: 92000408
- Added to NRHP: May 6, 1992

The George Jones Memorial Baptist Church, also known as the "Wheat Church," is a historic church building at the former site of the community of Wheat in Oak Ridge, Tennessee, United States. It is the only structure remaining from Wheat, a rural Roane County community that was dissolved in 1942 when the United States government assumed ownership of the land for the Manhattan Project.

Founded in 1854 as a United Baptist congregation by 26 members of the Sulphur Springs Church of Christ, it was established in Wheat in the northern part of Roane County. Originally named the "Mount Zion Baptist Church," it changed its name to "George Jones Memorial Baptist Church" in 1901, after a local minister who had donated most of the land for the community. In the same year, the congregation built a new building, which remains today.

The church is considered a good example of a rural vernacular church building. It is a three-bay, rectangular plan brick building with wood cladding, a square bell tower, and a standing-seam metal roof. There are two rooms in its interior, an anteroom and the sanctuary, separated from one another by a waist-high partition. A 1½ acre cemetery is located west of the church.

The George Jones church served not only as a religious facility, but also as a community gathering place for Wheat residents. When Wheat was vacated by the federal government in 1942 as part of the Manhattan Project, the George Jones Memorial Baptist Church was abandoned with the rest of the community. All other Wheat buildings have been demolished. As the only pre-1942 building remaining in what was once Wheat, the church is the location of annual reunions of former residents.

The church is east of the K-25 site and a short distance north of State Route 58, from which it is visible. It is located on the old Wheat Road, a gravel road (accessible from Blair Road (SR 327)) that follows the historical roadbed of a one-time local thoroughfare. The church building and the road are owned and maintained by the U.S. Department of Energy. Motorized travel on the road is limited to government vehicles, but the road is open to pedestrians and bicycles as a public greenway trail.

George Jones Memorial Baptist Church was one of six Oak Ridge properties listed on the National Register of Historic Places in 1992. This listing reflects its significance as the only existing physical remnant of the Wheat community, a physical representation of rural life in the area in the 19th century and the early decades of the 20th century, and an example of vernacular church architecture.
