= Cave Creek, Tennessee =

Cave Creek
- Unincorporated community
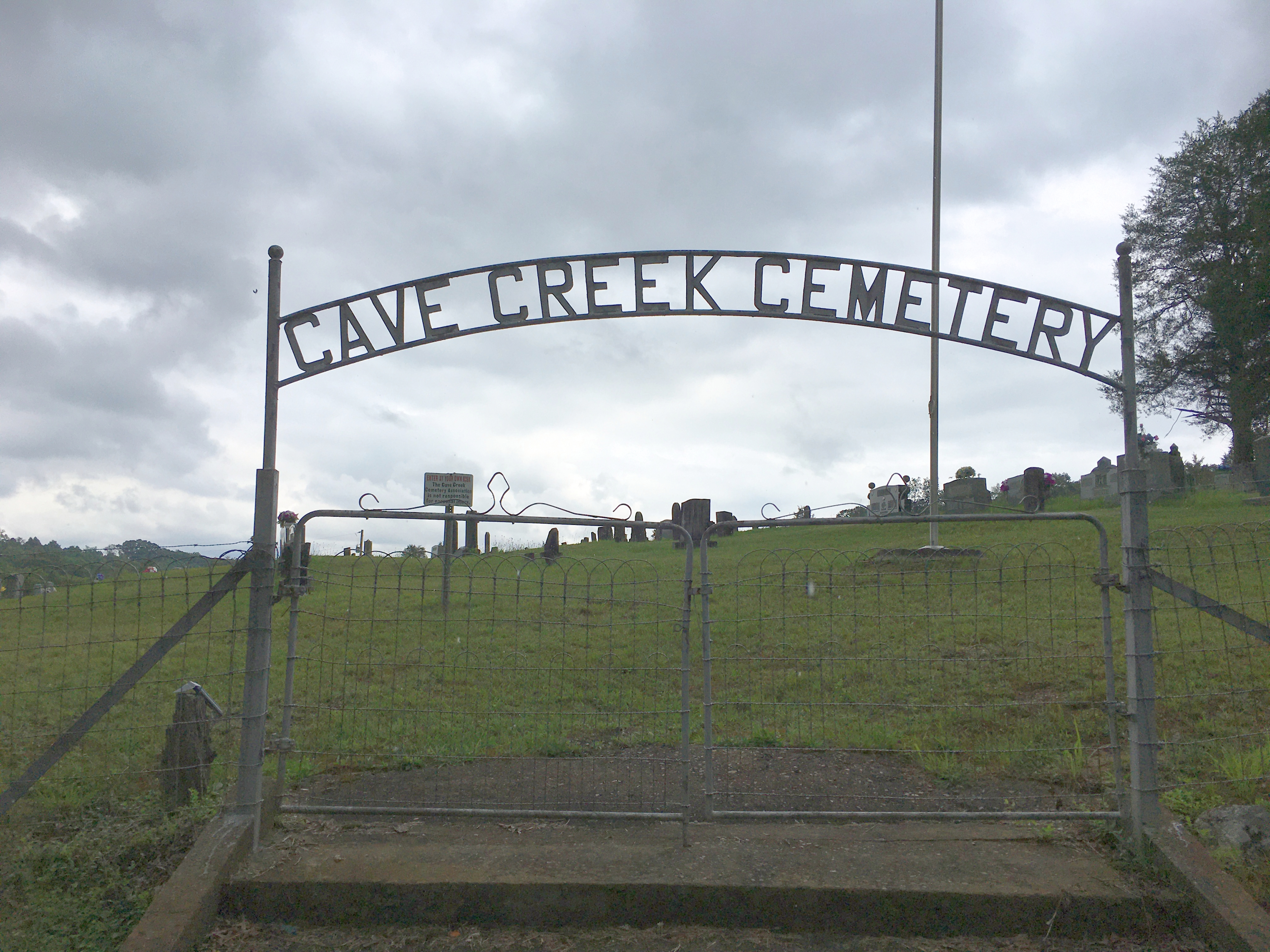
- Cave Creek Cemetery

- Location in Tennessee Location in the United States
- Coordinates: 35°48′50″N 84°23′15″W
- Country: United States
- State: Tennessee
- County: Roane
- Elevation: 509 ft (155 m)
- Time zone: UTC−5 (Eastern (EST))
  - Summer (DST): UTC−4 (EDT)
- ZIP Codes: 37763, 37774
- GNIS feature ID: 1314803

Cave Creek is an unincorporated community in Roane County, Tennessee, USA. It does not have a post office and is split between the ZIP codes for Kingston, 37763, and Loudon, 37774. Cave Creek is served by the East Roane County Volunteer Fire Hall #2.

== History ==
The Cave Creek area was settled in the early 1800s. The community had a school until 1960, and the building is now a community center.

On June 26, 1938, Felix Bushaloo Breazeale held his funeral in Cave Creek while he was still alive, an event that drew thousands of people, and later inspired the movie Get Low.

== Geography ==
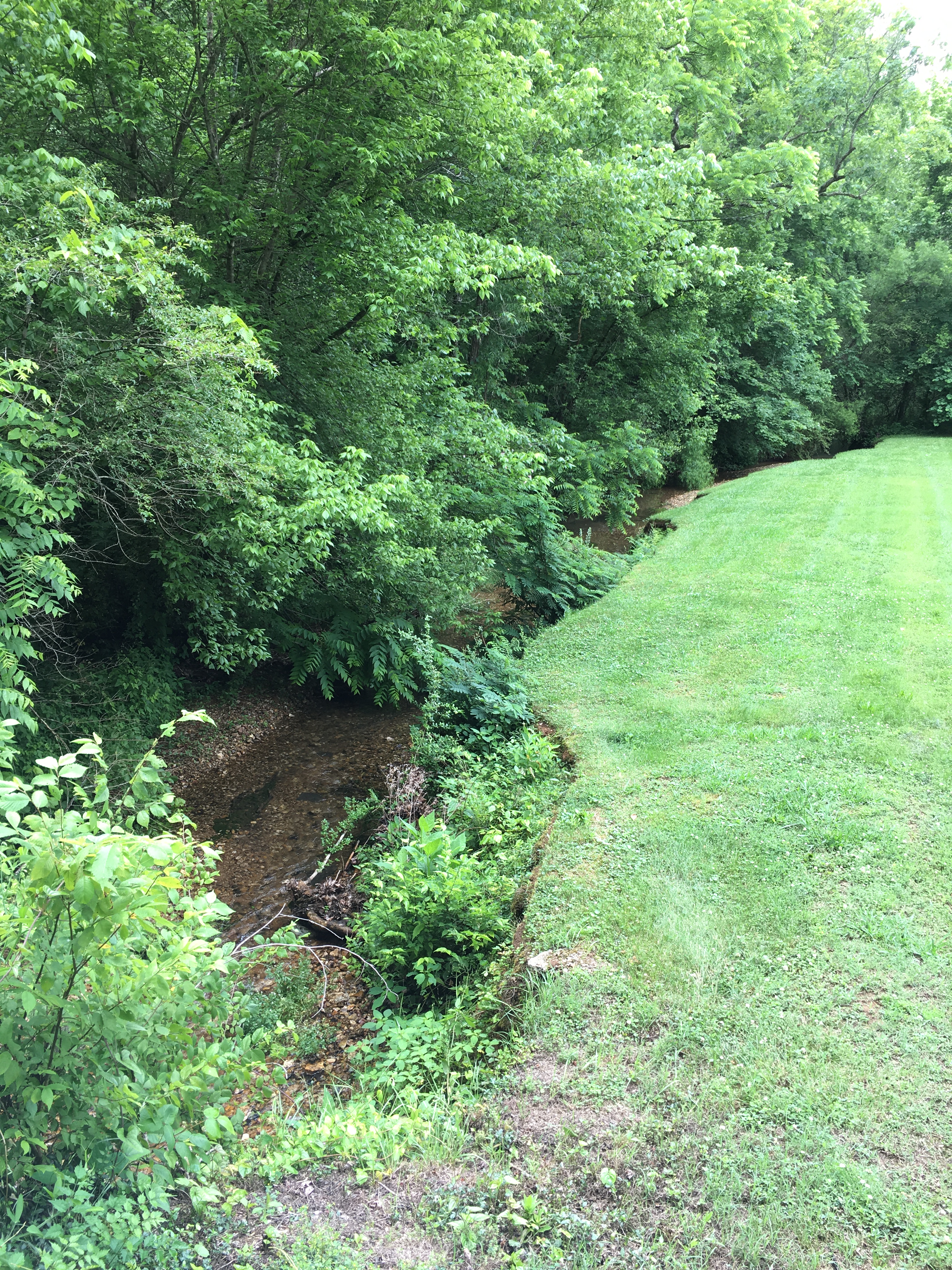
Cave Creek runs through the community

The community is located along Cave Creek Road, which intersects U.S. Route 70. Cave Creek, a tributary of the Tennessee River, runs alongside the road. The community is located in eastern Roane County, near the border with Loudon County.

The terrain is hilly, with elevations ranging from around 800 to 1200 feet.
