= Roane County High School =

Location
- 540 West Cumberland Street; Kingston, Tennessee 37763; United States; 35°52′30″N 84°31′13″W

Information
- School district: Roane County Schools
- Superintendent: Gary Aytes
- Principal: Aaron Jones
- Staff: 40.78 (FTE)
- Enrollment: 630 (2023–2024)
- Student to teacher ratio: 15.45
- Colors: Navy blue and orange
- Nickname: Yellow Jackets
- Website: School website

Roane County High School is located in Kingston, Tennessee, United States. It is the largest of the five high schools in Roane County. The school mascot is the Yellow Jacket. The school colors are navy and orange. Kingston is accredited by the Southern Association of Colleges and Schools and is a member of Tennessee Secondary Schools Athletic Association.

== Athletics ==
The athletic teams at Roane County High School typically revolve around the Yellow Jacket mascot. The athletic teams that students are able to join include the following:

- Baseball
- Boys Basketball
- Boys Soccer
- Cheerleading
- Cross Country
- Football
- Girls Basketball
- Girls Soccer
- Girls Volleyball
- Golf
- Softball
- Tennis
- Track
- Lacrosse

=== Football ===
The Kingston Yellow Jackets' football team hosts games at Dr. Nat Sugarman Memorial field. The football team won the state championship in 1973 (Class AA).

=== Golf ===
The Kingston golf team won the TSSAA Class A-AA State Championship back-to-back years in 1999 and 2000.

== Clubs and activities ==
Clubs and activities at Roane County High School include:

- Advanced Academic Achievers Club
- Art Club
- Beta Club
- Book Jackets Readers Club
- Craft Club
- Crosswalk Club
- Drama Club
- Fellowship Of Christian Athletes
- Full Metal Jackets
- GSA
- HOSA
- Interact Club
- Key Club
- Science Bowl Team
- Spanish Club
- Student Council

== Notable alumni ==
- Riley Keaton – politician
- Bowden Wyatt – College Football Hall of Fame as player and coach
