= Cedar Grove, Roane County, Tennessee =

Cedar Grove, Tennessee
- Unincorporated community
- Location within Tennessee Location within the United States
- Coordinates: 35°50′42″N 84°27′46″W
- Country: United States
- State: Tennessee
- County: Roane
- Elevation: 879 ft (268 m)
- Time zone: UTC-5 (Eastern (EST))
  - Summer (DST): UTC-4 (EDT)
- Area code: 865
- GNIS feature ID: 1314808

Cedar Grove is an unincorporated community in Roane County, Tennessee, United States. Cedar Grove is 3.5 miles (5.6 km) southeast of Kingston.
