= Battle of Kingston =

Battle of the American Civil War

- Part of the American Civil War
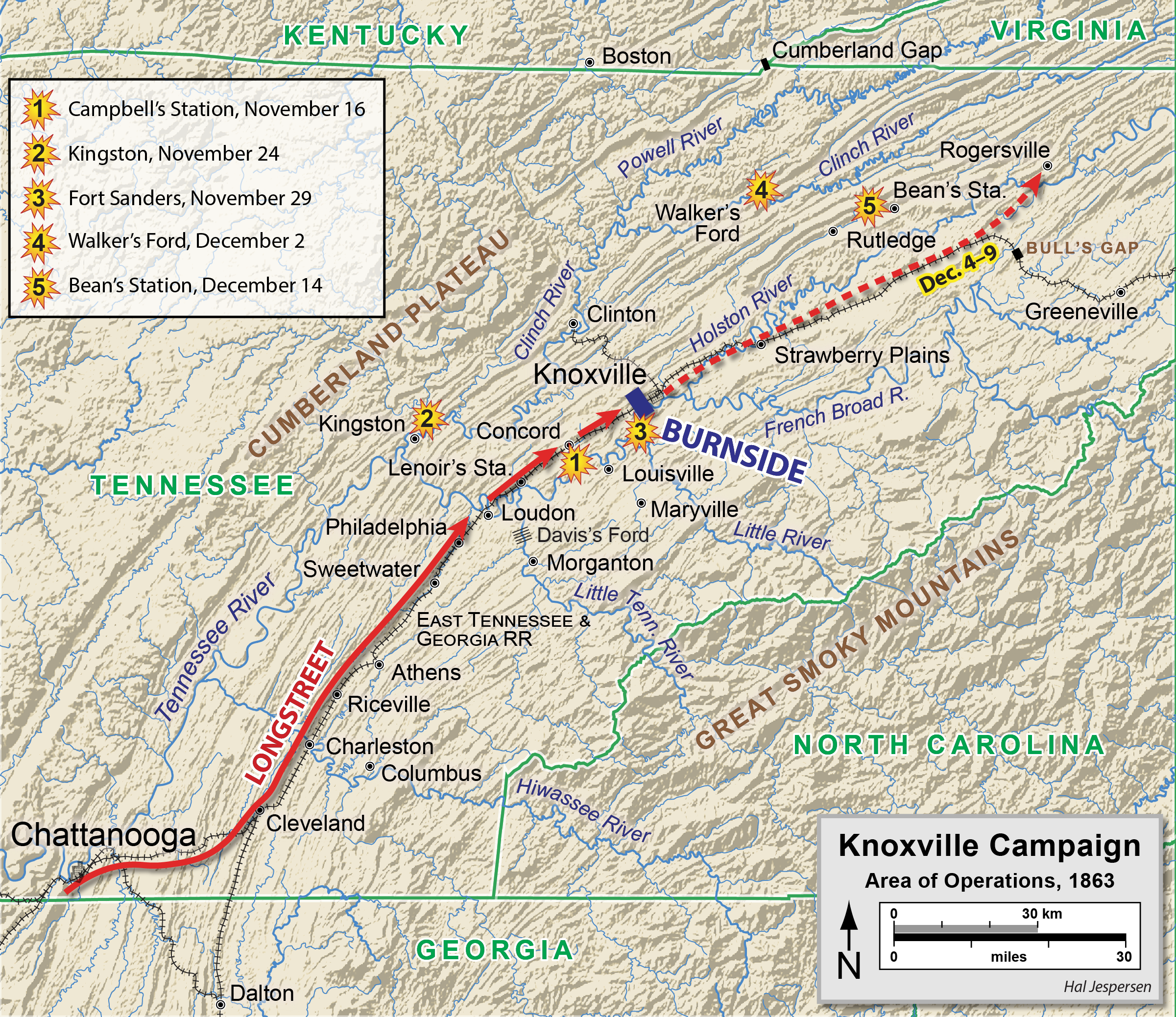
- Battle of Kingston in the Knoxville Campaign
Date	November 24, 1863
Location	Kingston, Tennessee 35°52′51″N 84°30′31″W
Result	Union victory

Belligerents
United States (Union)	(Confederate States of America) CSA (Confederacy)

Commanders and leaders
(United States) Robert K. Byrd	(Confederate States of America) Joseph Wheeler

Units involved
1st Brigade, 2nd Division, XXIII Corps, Army of the Ohio	Armstrong's Division; William T. Martin's Division

Strength
1 infantry brigade 1 mounted infantry regiment	2 cavalry divisions (minus 5 regiments)

Casualties and losses
20	50

The Battle of Kingston (November 24, 1863) saw Major General Joseph Wheeler with two divisions of Confederate cavalry attempt to overcome the Union garrison of Kingston, Tennessee, led by Colonel Robert K. Byrd. The Confederates mistakenly believed that the Kingston garrison was weak, but in fact, it comprised a brigade of infantry and a regiment of mounted infantry. When Wheeler's cavalrymen began probing the Union position, they discovered that its defenders were too numerous, and the position was too strong. The Confederate cavalry withdrew to rejoin Lieutenant General James Longstreet's forces in the Siege of Knoxville, but Wheeler himself returned to the Army of Tennessee near Chattanooga.
