= GE U23B =

Diesel-electric locomotive built by GE Transportation

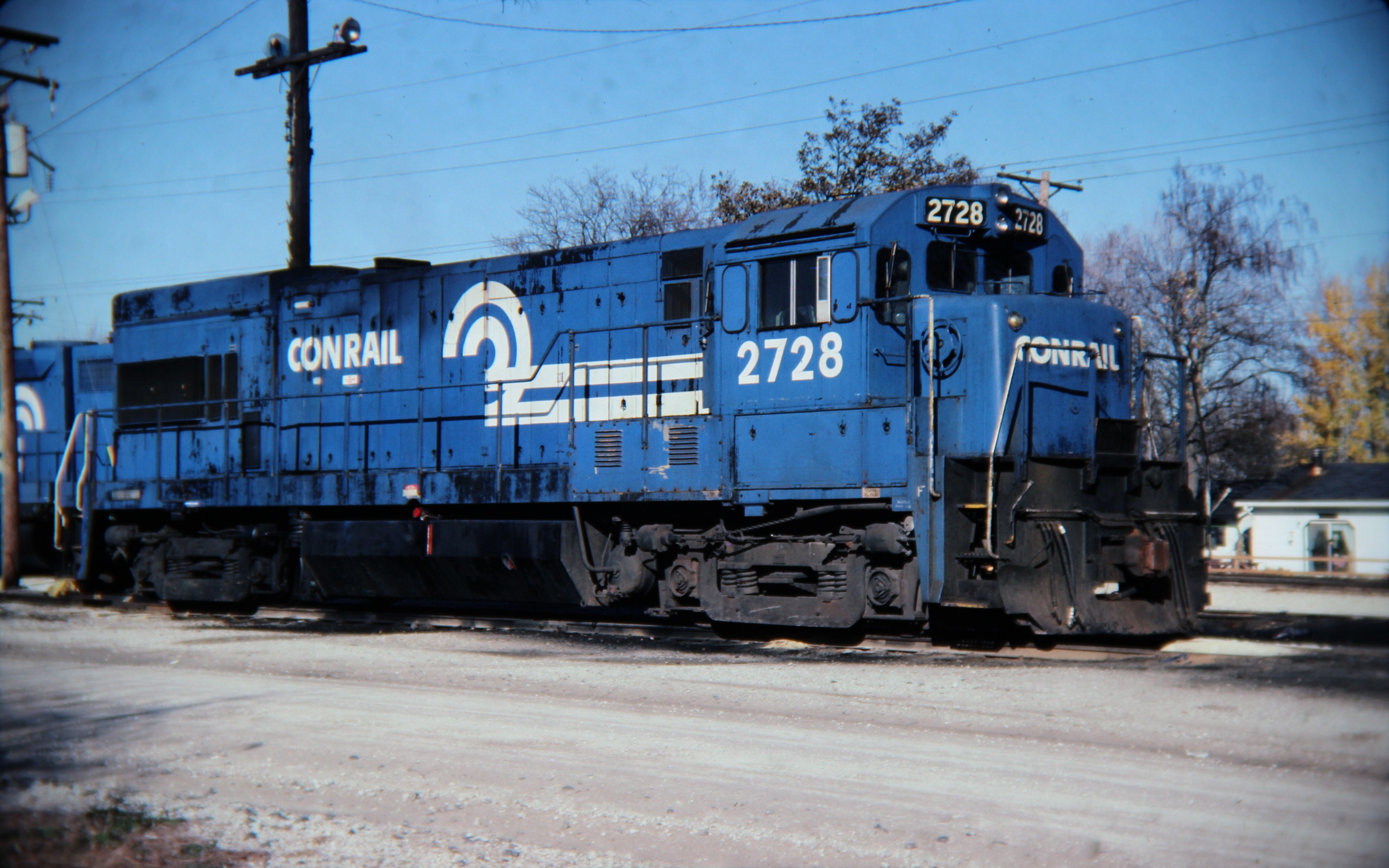
- Conrail 2728
Type and origin
- Power type: Diesel-electric
- Builder: GE Transportation Systems
- Model: U23B
- Build date: August 1968 – June 1977
- Total produced: 481
Specifications
- Configuration
  - AAR: B-B
- Gauge: 4 ft 8 1/2 in (1,435 mm)
- Wheel diameter: 40 in (1,000 mm)
- Length: 60 ft 2 in (18.34 m)
- Width: 9 ft 11 in (3.02 m)
- Height: 15 ft 4.5 in (4.69 m)
- Loco weight: 242,000 lb (109,769 kg)
- Prime mover: GE 7FDL-12
- Cylinders: 12
Performance figures
- Maximum speed: 70 mph (113 km/h)
- Power output: 2,250 hp (1,680 kW)
- Tractive effort: 90,000 lb (41,000 kg)

The GE U23B is a 2,250 horsepower diesel-electric locomotive built by GE Transportation from 1968 to 1977. It was one of the most successful models of the Universal Series, with 481 units built, including 16 exported to Peru. The U23B was replaced by the B23-7.

== History ==
Featuring a 12 cylinder FDL engine, the U23B was a derivative of the U30B with a lower horsepower rating, producing 2,250 hp compared to the U30B's 3,000 hp.

A variant with 6 axles instead of 4 was produced, known as the U23C.

== Original owners ==
Image	Railroad	Quantity	Numbers	Notes
	Atchison, Topeka and Santa Fe Railway	49	6300-6348	
	Chesapeake and Ohio Railway	30	2300–2329	Blomberg trucks
	Conrail	10	2789–2798	
	Delaware and Hudson Railway	16	301-316	
	Ferrocarril del Pacífico	10	537-546	
	Lehigh Valley Railroad	12	501-512	financed by USRA, to Conrail 2777–2788 in 1976
	Louisville and Nashville Railroad	90	2708–2772, 2800–2824	FB-2 trucks
	Milwaukee Road	5	4800-4804	
	Missouri-Kansas-Texas Railroad	3	350-352	
	Missouri Pacific Railroad	39	668-674, 2257–2288	renumbered 4502–4535. FB-2 trucks
	Monon Railroad	8	601-608	to L&N 2700–2707 in 1971
	Ferrocarriles Nacionales de México	30	9100-9129	9114-9121 AAR type-B trucks, all others FB-2
	Penn Central Transportation	77	2700–2776	to Conrail 2700–2776 in 1976
	Southern Peru Copper	16	40-45, 50–59	FB-2 trucks
	Southern Railway	70	3900-3969	High-nose, 3900–3914 with AAR type-B trucks, 3935–3969 with FB-2, all long hood forward
	Texas Utilities	1	103	
	Western Pacific Railroad	15	2251–2265	Blomberg trucks

== Surviving locomotives ==
Not many U23Bs still exist, but a few shortline and regional railroads still use them in everyday service. The Georgia Central Railway was one of the last U23B holdouts, rostering almost all of the remaining ex Southern Railway (U.S.) high short hood U23Bs. The Georgia Central as of July 2015 has all of its U23Bs off of the roster with the 3965 going to the Southern Appalachia Railway Museum in Oak Ridge, TN. Another U23B, CSX 9553, former L&N 2817, is preserved at the museum and is operable.

The Huntsville and Madison County Railroad Authority in Huntsville, AL, operates one of the last U23B's used in daily freight service, as of April 2020. HMCR 9554 was originally built in late 1974 as L&N 2800.

The last U23B built, Conrail 2798, and more recently Providence and Worcester 2203, was acquired by the Railroad Museum of New England in Thomaston, Connecticut in 2003, and is in regular freight and excursion service at the Naugatuck Railroad, owned by the museum.

Carmeuse Lime & Stone in Annville, Pennsylvania, owns a EX-Conrail U23B sitting dormant and half scrapped on a siding on the edge of the property.

Western Rail Inc in Airway Heights, WA currently has a U23B that is leased out to other railroads. It is numbered NIWX 2204 and is a Northern Illinois and Wisconsin locomotive.

RJ Corman operates at least one, Road Number 2300, after acquiring the Lehigh Railway short line in Northeast Pennsylvania.
