= GE BQ23-7 =

Model of diesel locomotive

- CSXT BQ23-7 3001 brings a transfer run thru Blue Island, IL in November of 1991
Type and origin
- Power type: Diesel-electric
- Builder: General Electric
- Build date: October 1978 to January 1979
- Total produced: 10
Specifications
- Configuration
  - AAR: B-B
- Gauge: 4 ft 8 1/2 in (1,435 mm)
- Trucks: Blomberg B
- Prime mover: 7FDL12
- Aspiration: Turbocharged
- Generator: GE GY27
- Traction motors: GE 752AF (4)
- Cylinders: 12
- Gear ratio: 83:20
Performance figures
- Maximum speed: 70 mph (113 km/h)
- Power output: 2,250 hp (1,677.82 kW)
Career
- Operators: Seaboard Coast Line Railroad; Seaboard System; CSX Transportation
- Numbers: SCL: 5130-5139 CSXT: 3000-3009
- Nicknames: "Busses" "Aegis Cruisers"
- Locale: eastern United States
- Scrapped: 2001
- Disposition: all scrapped

The GE BQ23-7 was a model of diesel locomotive manufactured by General Electric, a variant of the B23-7 built between 1978 and 1979 (the 'Q' stood for "crew Quarters"). It was mechanically identical to a regular B23-7, but equipped with an enlarged operating cab for accommodating the train crew, thus making a case for eliminating the caboose from the rear of freight trains. SCL no.5130-5139 were the only ones built. Following a practice dating back to ACL and SAL U30Bs of 1967, SCL's 10 BQ23-7s and 30 standard B23-7s were delivered riding on reconditioned Blomberg trucks from EMD trade-ins.

Only ten were built, all for the Seaboard Coast Line railroad, (originally no.5130–5139). CSX later inherited these locomotives, operating them into the late 1990s and early 2000s.

None of these locomotives survive today. All were scrapped in 2001.
