= GE B23-7 =

Model of diesel locomotive

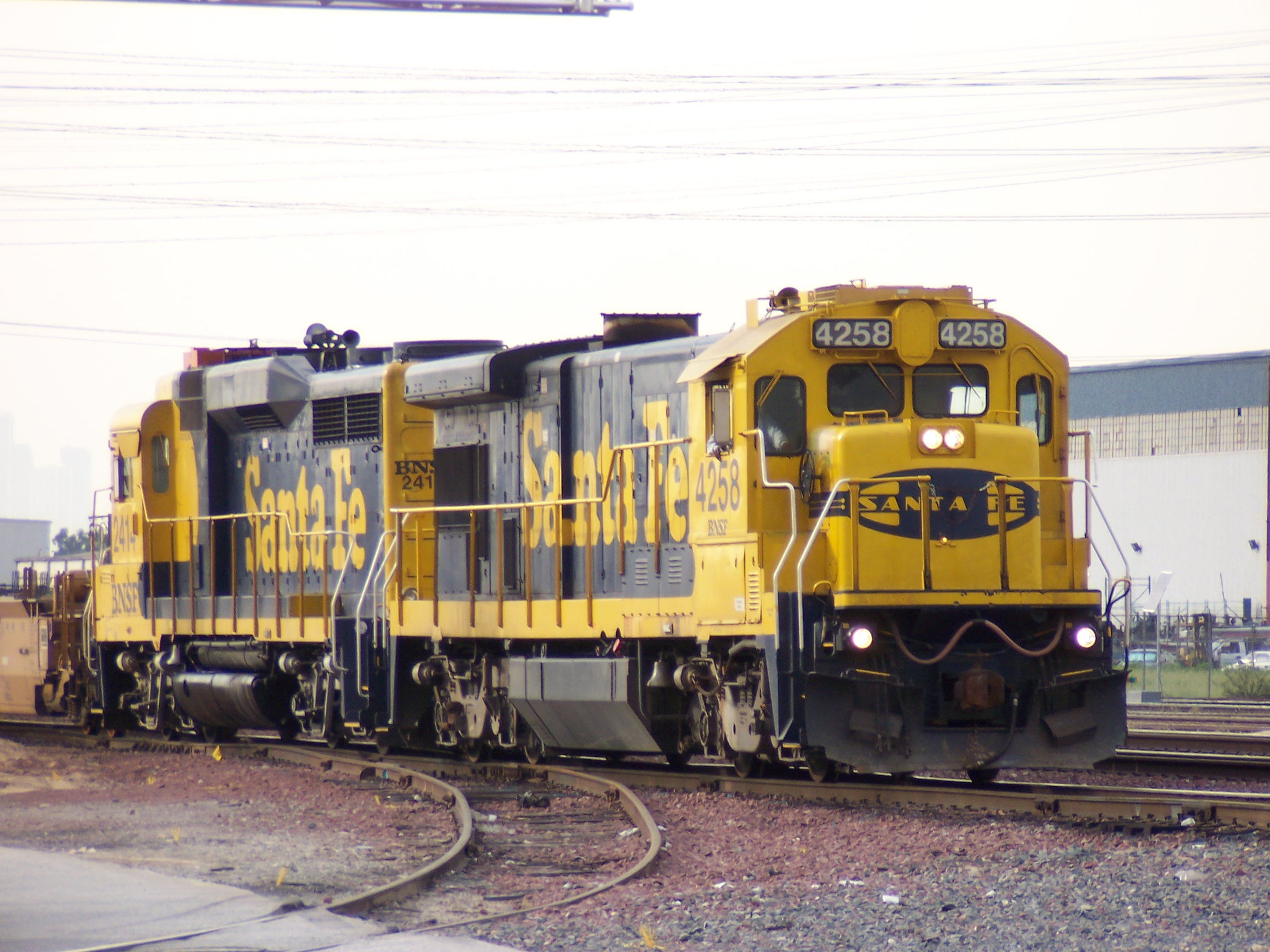
- BNSF 4258 switching the intermodal yards at Commerce, California, February 15, 2005.
Type and origin
- Power type: Diesel-electric
- Builder: GE Transportation Systems GE de Brazil
- Model: B23-7
- Build date: SEP 1977 – DEC 1984
- Total produced: U.S. - 412 units; Mexico - 124 units.
Specifications
- Configuration
  - AAR: B-B
  - UIC: Bo'Bo'
- Gauge: 4 ft 8 1/2 in (1,435 mm) standard gauge 1,600 mm (5 ft 3 in), Brazil
- Length: 62 ft 2 in (18.95 m)
- Prime mover: GE FDL-12
- Engine type: V12 diesel
- Cylinders: 12
Performance figures
- Power output: 2,250 hp (1,680 kW)
Career
- Nicknames: B-boat

The GE B23-7 is a diesel locomotive model that was first offered by GE in late 1977. Featuring a smaller 12 cylinder version of the FDL engine, it is the successor to GE's U23B produced from early 1968 to mid 1977, but at 62 ft 2 in (18.95 m) long is exactly 2 ft 0 in (0.61 m). longer. It competed with the very successful EMD GP38-2. General Electric also produced a variant, the BQ23-7, No. 5130-5139, for the Seaboard Coast Line. A total of 536 B23-7's were built for 9 U.S. customers and 2 Mexican customers.

== Preservation ==
Ohio Central #4092, a B23-S7 "Super Seven," is owned by the Age of Steam Roundhouse in Sugarcreek, Ohio. It was rebuilt from former Western Pacific U23B #2252.

== Operators ==
| Owner | Quantity | Numbers | Notes |
|---|---|---|---|
| Atchison, Topeka and Santa Fe Railway | 69 | 6350-6418 | 6405-6418 last B23-7s built Transferred to BNSF |
| Conrail | 141 | 1900-2023, 2800-2816 | 2800-2816 first B23-7s built Three sold to Metro-North, others split between CSX & NS. |
| Ferrocaril Unidos del Sureste | 3 | 522-524 | |
| Louisville and Nashville Railroad (Family Lines) | 15 | 5115-5129 | Transferred to CSX |
| Missouri Pacific Railroad | 85 | 2289-2338, 4650-4684 | 2289-2338 renumbered to 4600–4649 Transferred To Union Pacific |
| Ferrocarriles Nacionales de México | 122 | 1-01-1-08, 9130-9180, 10001-10052, 12000-12011 | |
| Providence and Worcester | 1 | 2201 | Transferred to Railroad Museum of New England for parts |
| Seaboard Coast Line Railroad (Family Lines) | 29 | 5100-5114, 5130-5139 (BQ23-7), 5140-5153 | |
| Southern Railway | 54 | 3970-4023 | High Hoods. Transferred to NS |
| Southern Pacific Railroad | 15 | 5100-5114 | |
| Texas Utilities | 2 | 3306-3307 | |
