= Suck-egg Hollow =

Coordinates: 35.78998°N 84.59571°W

Suck-egg Hollow is a valley in Roane County, Tennessee, in the United States.

Suck-egg Hollow was named from an incident when a snake was found eating the chicken eggs of a local farmer.
