= Tennessee State Route 325 =

State highway in Tennessee, United States

State Route 325
- SR 325 highlighted in red

Route information
- Maintained by TDOT
- Length: 18.0 mi (29.0 km)
- Existed: July 1, 1983–present

Major junctions
- West end: Star Point Resort in western Pickett County on Dale Hollow Lake
- SR 111 in Byrdstown
- East end: US 127 near the Pickett/Fentress County line near Pall Mall

Location
- Country: United States
- State: Tennessee
- Counties: Pickett, Fentress

Highway system
- Tennessee State Routes; Interstate; US; State
← SR 324	→ SR 326

State Route 325 (SR 325) is a secondary state highway located in northeastern Middle Tennessee. The length of the route is an estimated total of 18.0 miles (29.0 km) through Pickett and northwestern Fentress Counties.

== Route description ==
The western terminus of SR 325 is located on the eastern shores of Dale Hollow Lake, at the Star Point Resort in western Pickett County. SR 325 then passes through Cordell Hull Birthplace State Park before running concurrently with SR 111 into downtown Byrdstown. SR 325 winds its way eastward, some of its path straddles the Pickett/Fentress County line along its way to its eastern end at a junction with US 127 (SR 28) just northwest of Pall Mall.

== History ==
SR 325 west of Byrdstown was originally a part of SR 53 that served as a direct route from Byrdstown to Celina, in Clay County until sometime around 1943, when the U.S. Army Corps of Engineers impounded the Obey River to create Dale Hollow Lake. The dam was built just off the current SR 53. The lake's formation disconnected the roadway between the two cities, and parts of SR 53 in that area, along with most of the town of Willow Grove, is now under water. After the dam was built in Clay County, SR 53 was rerouted to the Kentucky state line to become a then-new alignment of KY 61, which also followed a path directly into the lake. The SR 325 designation was assigned to SR 53's original Pickett County course several years later. As a result, the quickest way to get from Celina to Byrdstown is to drive a route from the two cities via Livingston, in Overton County using State Routes 52 and 111.

Parts of SR 325 in downtown Byrdstown was also an original alignment of SR 42 (now SR 111) until that route was realigned to its current path into and around the city.

== Major intersections ==
County	Location	mi	km	Destinations	Notes
Pickett		0.0	0.0	Dead end at Dale Hollow Lake	Western terminus
Pickett	Byrdstown	6.0	9.7	SR 111 south (Livingston Highway) – Livingston	Western end of SR 111 concurrency
Pickett	Byrdstown	6.7	10.8	SR 111 north – Static, Albany, KY	Eastern end of SR 111 concurrency
Fentress	No major junctions				
Pickett		18.0	29.0	US 127 (N York Highway/SR 28) – Albany, KY, Static, Pall Mall, Jamestown	Eastern terminus; provides access to Sgt. Alvin C. York State Historic Park
1.000 mi = 1.609 km; 1.000 km = 0.621 mi: Concurrency terminus
