= Wheat, Tennessee =

Human settlement in Tennessee, United States of America

Coordinates: 35°56′12″N 84°22′25″W

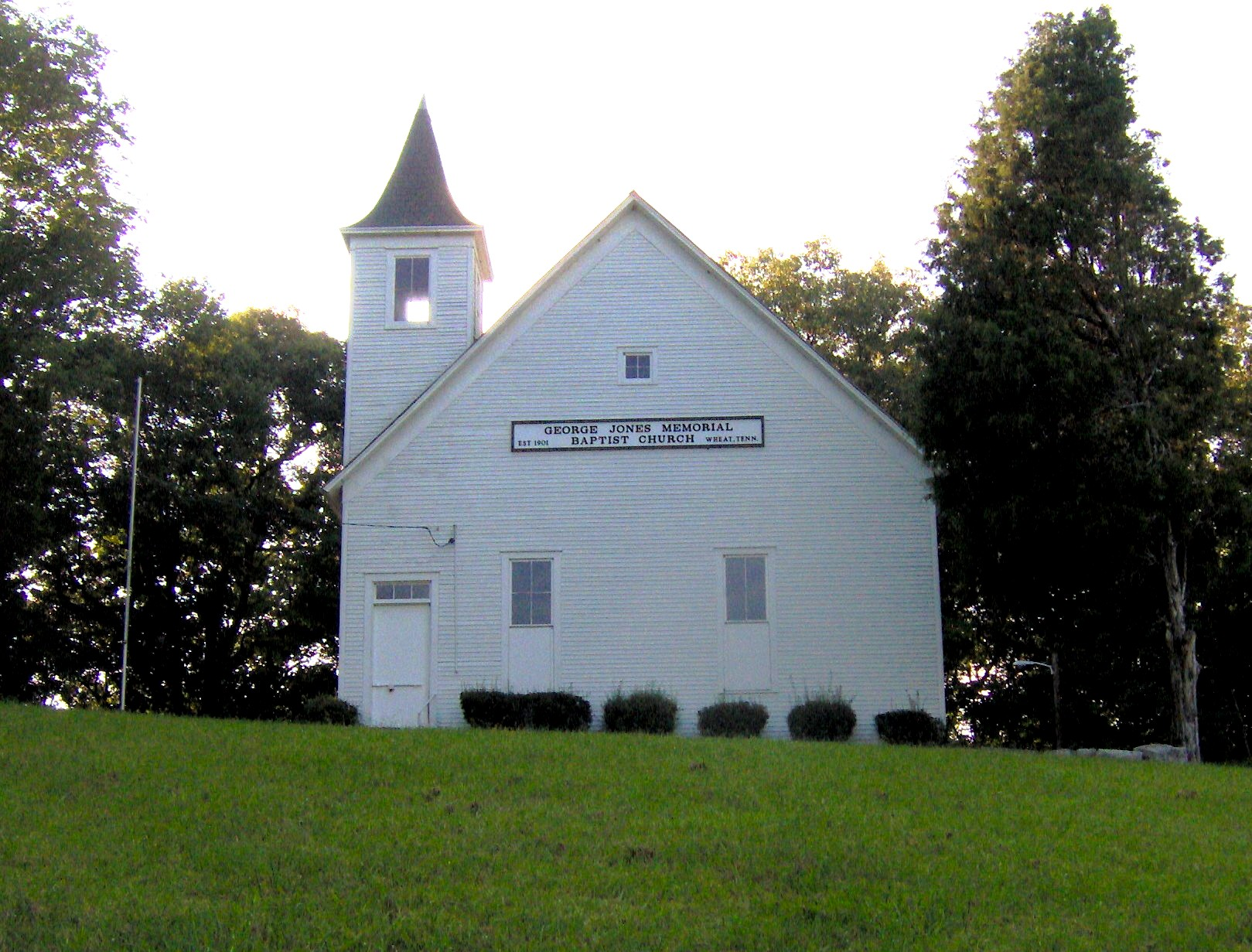
The George Jones Memorial Baptist Church is the only building still standing in Wheat. It is listed on the National Register of Historic Places.

Wheat was a farming community in Roane County, Tennessee. The area is now in the city of Oak Ridge.

The earliest settlers moved into the area in the late 18th century. However, it was not until 1846 that the area was established as the community of Bald Hill. The name was changed to Wheat in 1880, when a post office was opened and the community took the name of its first postmaster, Frank Wheat.

The first settler with the surname of Wheat and the recognized founding father of the town is Levi Henderson Wheat, born in Virginia between 1770 – 1780. Levi is first shown on a tax record within Roane County, Tennessee in 1805. On Nov 14, 1814, a “tract of land being in the 3rd Civil District, on the waters of Paw Paw Creek, consisting of 146 acres is conveyed to Levi Wheat from Jason Matlock for the sum of $200”. Levi Wheat worked the land as a farmer, married three times, and bore a total of 18 children. Levi served in the War of 1812 as a Private under Captain John McKamy’s Company of East Tennessee Militia, Colonel E Booth’s Regiment. Levi Henderson Wheat died prior to April 20, 1849, the date of his estate probate, in Roane County, Tennessee.

Early farming residents included John Henry and Elizabeth Inman Welcker. They owned Laurel Banks plantation on the Clinch River from the early 19th century until c. 1840. Records from the time show that the Welckers were active in the purchase and sale of slaves. George Hamilton Gallaher purchased the property in the 1840s, and it is now referred to as the Gallaher-Stone Plantation. The Wheat Community African Burial Ground (AEC #2) and Gallaher-Welcker Cemetery (AEC #1) still survive. The African Burial Ground was long forgotten, but the site was found in 2000 by Will Minter and was cleaned up and marked by U.S. Department of Energy personnel and volunteers. At least some of those buried in the African Burial Ground are believed to have been part of the Gallaher-Stone Plantation; a monument to those held in slavery is on the cemetery grounds.

Wheat eventually included several churches, a seminary/college, several stores, a gas station and a Masonic lodge. Poplar Creek Seminary, founded in 1886 by a Presbyterian minister, later became Roane College. In 1908, the college transferred ownership of the building to Wheat High School.

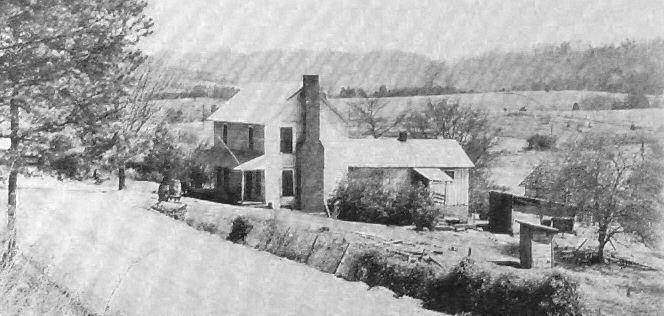
Farmhouse in Wheat

The community of Wheat was dissolved, and residents displaced, in 1942 when the United States government purchased the land as part of the Manhattan Project. Most of the site remains in federal government ownership, managed by the United States Department of Energy.

The George Jones Memorial Baptist Church is the only Wheat building still standing. It is listed on the National Register of Historic Places. The Crawford Presbyterian Church building was torn down for a highway construction project. The cemeteries of both churches are maintained and are still used for burials of former Wheat residents and family members. The Wheat community, including former residents and their families, holds a "homecoming" reunion at the George Jones Church every year on the first Sunday in October.

== Sources ==
- Excerpts From Oak Ridge National Laboratory: The First 50 Years
- Historical Markers of Oak Ridge
