= Southern Appalachia Railway Museum =

Coordinates: 35.92741°N 84.39022°W

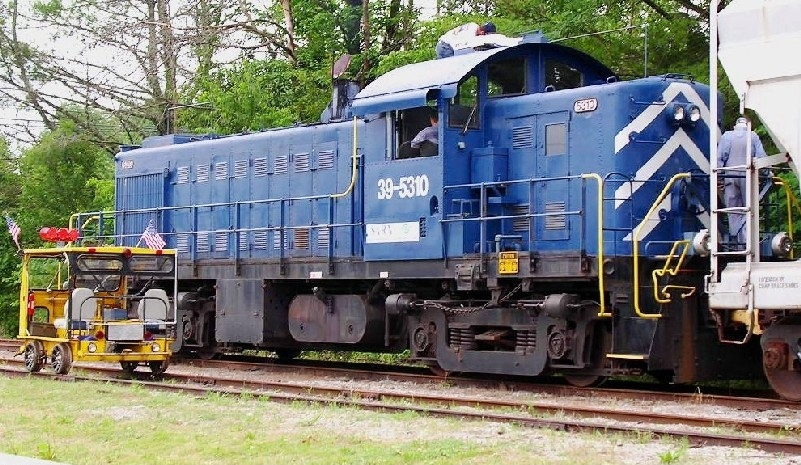
- An Alco RS-1 of the Southern Appalachia Railway Museum.

Overview
- Headquarters: Knoxville
- Reporting mark: SARM
- Locale: Knoxville, Tennessee
- Dates of operation: 1990–present

Technical
- Track gauge: 4 ft 8 1/2 in (1,435 mm)

Other
- Website: www.sarmrail.org

Southern Appalachia Railway Museum is a railway museum headquartered in Knoxville, Tennessee, United States.

== History ==
The Southern Appalachia Railway Museum was founded in 1990. The museum collects antique locomotives and rolling stock to run on their 7 miles of track from the K-25 facility in Oak Ridge, Tennessee to an interchange with Norfolk Southern at Blair, Tennessee and back. The museum formerly ran an excursion train along this route using their rolling stock. The ride runs over former Southern Railway trackage. The excursion train's name was the Secret City Scenic using Oak Ridge's nickname the "Secret City". The museum does an annual trip and railfan weekend. The excursion train typically ran on the first and third weekend of each month with the exception of special trains. A freight railroad still uses the tracks with the Scenic sometimes using some of the engines. The museum is currently restoring a Southern EMD E8 #6913 among other projects. The museum's ticket office is an old guard station that has been restored.

In 2000, the reuse committee of the Community Reuse Organization of East Tennessee approved a lease of land to the museum for a visitor center, train depot and repair shop.

In 2016 the museum ceased passenger excursion train operations but continues the restoration and preservation missions while seeking out a new home for excursions.

== Rolling stock ==
=== Locomotives ===
- Seaboard Coast Line Railroad #2024 EMD SD45 | Operational, currently lettered as Clinchfield Railroad #3632
- Southern Railway #6913 EMD E8 | Under restoration
- Wabash B905 ALCO C-424 | Operational, runs at the Delaware-Lackawanna Railroad
- U.S.A.E.C. #5310 ALCO RS-1 | Operational
- U.S. Army #7100 ALCO S-2 | donated to the Tennessee Valley Railroad Museum in 2019
- U.S. Army #7125 ALCO S-2 | Operational?
- L&N #1315 ALCO C-420 | Operational
- Georgia Central #3965 GE U23B | Operational, ex Southern Railway, later Norfolk Southern
- CSX #9553 GE U23B | Operational, ex Louisville & Nashville #2817, nicknamed "Maintenance Of Wade"
- Southern Railway #2561 EMD GP30 | Operational, to be restored to its original appearance
- L&N #1030 EMD GP30 | Operational, fully restored to its original appearance in September 2026
- Clinchfield Railroad #800 EMD F3A | Operational, famously moved C&O 2716 for restoration in 1979, and again in 2019 for 2nd restoration

=== Passenger Cars ===
- Central of Georgia coach no. 663 1947 ACF Coach
- Central of Georgia coach no. 664 1947 Budd Coach "Fort Oglethorpe"
- Central of Georgia coach no. 665 1947 Budd Coach "Fort McPherson"
- Southern Railway no. 34 1928 ACF RPO
- Southern Railway no. 543 1942 St.LCC Baggage Car
- Southern Railway no. 2206 1949 Pullman sleeper "Roanoke Valley"
- Southern Railway no. 3164 1926 Pullman dining car (on loan)

=== Freight Cars ===
- Kansas City Southern no. 3763 1938 ACF Bulkhead Flatcar
- Louisville & Nashville no. 6487 Caboose
- Oneida & Western no. 9990 Caboose (on loan)
- Savannah & Atlanta no. X253 Caboose
- Southern Railway no. X261 1973 Gantt Manuf. Caboose
- Speno no. SRBX-24 Boxcar, former Boston & Maine
- Tennessee Valley Authority Flatcar
