= Blair, Tennessee =

Blair
- Interactive map of Blair
- Coordinates: 35°59′33″N 84°25′15″W
- Country: United States
- State: Tennessee
- County: Roane County
- Elevation: 879 ft (268 m)
- GNIS feature ID: 1314691

Blair is an unincorporated community in Roane County, Tennessee, United States.

Blair is where the Southern Appalachia Railway Museum's railroad line connects with the Norfolk Southern railroad.
