= Seaboard Coast Line Railroad =

Transport company

Overview
- Headquarters: Jacksonville, FL and Richmond, VA
- Reporting mark: SCL
- Locale: Southeastern United States
- Dates of operation: 1967–1983
- Predecessor: Atlantic Coast Line Railroad; Seaboard Air Line Railroad
- Successor: Seaboard System (an operating company of CSX Corporation)

Technical
- Track gauge: 4 ft 8 1/2 in (1,435 mm) standard gauge
- Length: 9,809 miles (15,786 km) (July 1967)

The Seaboard Coast Line Railroad (reporting mark SCL) was a Class I railroad company operating in the Southeastern United States beginning in 1967. Its passenger operations were taken over by Amtrak in 1971. Eventually, the railroad was merged with its affiliate lines to create the Seaboard System in 1983.

At the end of 1970, SCL operated 9,230 miles of railroad, not including the separate railroads that it controlled (A&WP, WofA, Georgia Railroad, Clinchfield, CN&L, Gainesville Midland, and L&N); that year it reported 31,293 million ton-miles of revenue freight and 512 million passenger-miles.

== History ==
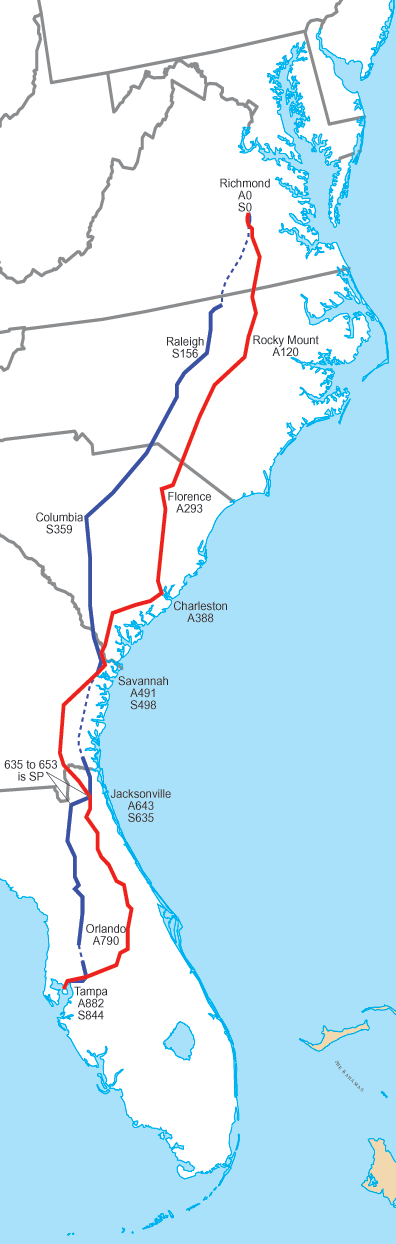
The main lines of the ACL (shown in red) and SAL (shown in blue), which became CSX's A and S lines

The Seaboard Coast Line emerged on July 1, 1967, following the merger of the Seaboard Air Line Railroad with the Atlantic Coast Line Railroad. The combined system totaled 9,809 miles (15,786 km), the eighth largest in the United States at the time. The railroad had $1.2 billion in assets and revenue with a 54% market share of rail service in the Southeast, facing competition primarily from the Southern. The seemingly redundant name resulted from the longstanding short-form names of these two major Southeastern railroads. For years, SAL had been popularly known as "Seaboard," while ACL was known as "the Coast Line."

Prior to the creation of Amtrak on May 1, 1971, the Seaboard Coast Line provided passenger service over much of its system, including local passenger trains on some lines. Local trains ended when the Amtrak era began. Although several named passenger trains survived through the Amtrak era, many were renamed or combined with other services.

The first expansion for the Seaboard Coast Line came in 1969 with the acquisition of the Piedmont and Northern Railway, which operated about 128 miles (206 km) in North and South Carolina. SCL would buy out the remaining shares and gain control of the Louisville and Nashville Railroad (L&N) in 1971, and also bought the Durham and Southern Railway from the Duke family in 1979. In 1978, SCL was approached by the Southern Pacific Railroad (SP) and entered negotiations for a potential transcontinental merger, with the L&N being used to connect the two railroads. In May of that year, then-SCL president Prime Osborn III personally called off the merger, but SCL still sold some of their stock to the SP.

On November 1, 1980, CSX Corporation was created as a holding company for the Family Lines and Chessie System Railroad. Effective January 1, 1983, the Seaboard Coast Line Railroad became Seaboard System Railroad after a merger with the previously mentioned railroads that it controlled. For some years prior to this, the SCL and L&N had been under the common ownership of a holding company, Seaboard Coast Line Industries (SCLI), the company's railroad subsidiaries being collectively known as the Family Lines System which consisted of the L&N, SCL, Clinchfield and West Point Routes. During this time, the railroads adopted the same paint schemes but continued to operate as separate railroads.

In 1983, CSX combined the Family Lines System units as the Seaboard System Railroad and later CSX Transportation when the former Chessie units merged with the Seaboard in December 1986.

== Notable SCL services ==
=== Passenger Trains ===
==== New York - Florida ====
- Silver Meteor, inaugurated February 2, 1939

Inherited from SAL. Initially an all-coach train (Pullman sleepers added in 1941), first streamliner to serve Florida, New York to Tampa/St. Petersburg and Miami. Trains continued beyond Tampa to Sarasota and Venice. Preserving its reputation as "one of the finest [trains] in the country," the train retained its round-ended observation cars until Amtrak took over operation in 1971. Still in Amtrak service today with updated equipment.

- Silver Star, inaugurated December 12, 1947

Inherited from SAL. Streamliner, coach and Pullman cars, New York to Tampa/St. Petersburg and Miami. Still in Amtrak service, with updated equipment (temporarily suspended and merged with the Capitol Limited as the Floridian).

- Champion, December 1, 1939 - October 1, 1979

Inherited from ACL. Streamliner, coach and Pullman cars, New York to Tampa/St. Petersburg and Miami. Initially continued by Amtrak, it was discontinued in 1979.

- Gulf Coast Special, 1920s – April 30, 1971

Inherited from ACL. Coach and Pullman cars, New York – Tampa. The train was not continued by Amtrak in 1971.

- Everglades, 1940s – April 30, 1971

Inherited from ACL. All-coach, New York – Jacksonville. The train was not continued by Amtrak in 1971.

- Palmland, Winter 1941 – April 30, 1971

Inherited from SAL. Coach and Pullman cars, New York – St.Petersburg/Miami. The route was cut back to Columbia, South Carolina as the southern terminus by 1968, and the train was not continued by Amtrak in 1971.

- Sunland, Winter 1948 – December 1968

Inherited from SAL. Coach and Pullman cars, New York – Tampa/Miami. Connections in Washington to New York and Boston. The route was cut back to Jacksonville, Florida as the southern terminus in February 1968, and later discontinued in December.

==== Winter Only ====
- Florida Special, Late 1800s - Spring 1972

Inherited from ACL. Streamliner, coach and Pullman cars, New York to Tampa/St. Petersburg and Miami. Initially continued by Amtrak, it was discontinued after the 1971-1972 winter season.

==== Miscellaneous ====
- Silver Comet, May 18, 1947 – October 15, 1969

Inherited from SAL. Streamliner, coach and Pullman cars, New York – Birmingham via Athens and Atlanta. The train was cut back to Washington – Atlanta only by January 1969, then to Richmond – Atlanta only by May, and finally discontinued October 15, 1969.

- Gulf Wind, July 31, 1949 – April 30, 1971

Inherited from SAL. Coach and Pullman cars, Jacksonville – New Orleans via Tallahassee, Pensacola and Mobile. Handled jointly by SCL and the Louisville and Nashville Railroad, with motive power changed at Chattahoochee. The train was not continued by Amtrak in 1971.

- Tidewater, November 1, 1953 – February 1968

Inherited from SAL. Streamliner, coach and Pullman cars, Portsmouth, Virginia – Jacksonville, Florida, forwarding cars to the Silver Comet at Hamlet, North Carolina. Ferries would transport passengers between Norfolk and Portsmouth. Coach only by 1968.

- Palmetto, 1944 – 1968

Inherited from ACL. All-coach, New York – Savannah. The name and route was later revived by Amtrak in 1976 and still operates today.

=== Juice Train ===
Juice Train is the popular name for famous unit trains of Tropicana fresh orange juice operated by railroads in the United States. On June 7, 1970, beginning on Seaboard Coast Line railroad, a mile-long Tropicana Juice Train began carrying one million gallons of juice with one weekly round-trip from Bradenton, Florida to Kearny, New Jersey, in the New York City area. The trip spanned 1,250 miles (2,010 km) one way, and the 60 car train was the equivalent of 250 trucks.

Today it is no longer operated by SCL successor CSX Transportation, a victim of CSX’s PSR operating philosophy. Tropicana refrigerated boxcars are still transported between Florida and New Jersey, however they are now mixed in with Intermodal trains. In the past, the Juice Trains have been the focus of efficiency studies and awards as examples of how modern rail transportation can compete successfully against trucking and other modes to carry perishable products.

== Motive power ==
Immediately following the 1967 merger, the newly created SCL network had 1,232 locomotives. The vast majority of the ACL roster contained EMD (Electro-Motive Division of General Motors) locomotives in addition to some General Electric (GE) and Alco models as well as Baldwin switchers, while the SAL rostered mainly EMD and Alco diesels in addition to some GE models and Baldwin switchers. Both railroads had purchased new freight locomotives in the 5 years leading up to the merger. Among the first new locomotives purchased by the Seaboard Coast Line were 28 GE U33B locomotives, acquired in 1967 and 1968. These were followed by 108 GE U36B locomotives between 1970 and 1972. From EMD, SCL purchased SD45 locomotives in 1968, with more to follow in 1971. SD45-2 locomotives were added in 1974. GP40 and GP40-2 locomotives were added to the fleet between 1968 and 1972 for use on through freights and other high priority freight trains. All former SAL locomotives ran for many years in the "Split-image" scheme, still in full SAL paint, but relettered and renumbered SCL. Two GP-7's 915 & 981 went from pure SAL to SCL Black without being in split-image and GP-7 944 and RS-3 1156 were never painted black, and retained their SAL paint until retired in 1976. The last operating SCL locomotive in SAL paint was GP-40 1559, former SAL 644, and was repainted at Hamlet, NC in March 1976 according to records. There were former P&N locomotives that retained their P&N scheme from 1969 until 1977, only RS-3's 1250 & 1256 and S-4 230 ever were repainted SCL black.

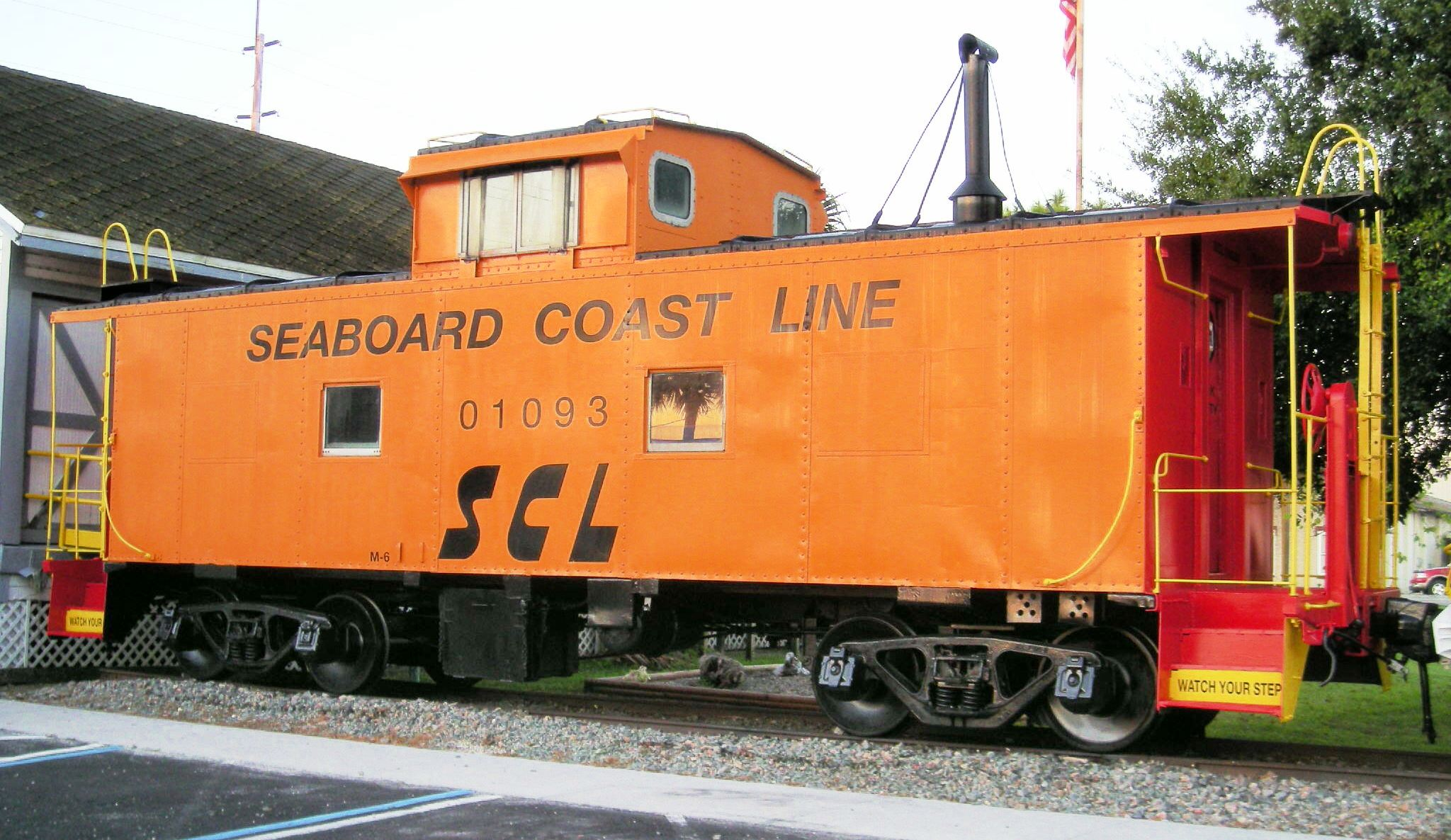
Former Seaboard Coast Line Railroad class M-6 caboose on display at the Mulberry Phosphate Museum in Mulberry, Florida.

Gainesville Midland SD-40, retained its SAL paint until 1986 when it was repainted Seaboard System 8300, it had been SBD 0010 and 8300 in SAL style "split-image" for several years prior to that.

SCL supplemented its local freight units with orders of GE U18B and EMD GP38-2 locomotives. Some U18B models contained a shorter, and therefore lighter, fuel tank which proved ideal for light density lines. Most units of this type were assigned to the Carolinas. However, in 1978 the SCL decided not to purchase any more locomotives for local service on secondary mainlines and branchlines, instead aging GP7, GP9, and GP18 locomotives would be rebuilt into GP16 models at the Uceta shops.

In the years leading up to the creation of the Seaboard System in 1983, SCL began acquiring the next generation of locomotives from EMD and GE. These orders included GE B23-7 locomotives in 1978 and 1980, including the GE BQ23-7 variant, of which only 10 were built and all belonged to SCL. EMD GP38-2 units were added in 1979 and 1980, and 5 EMD GP40-2 locomotives also delivered in 1980. Six axle GE C30-7 and EMD SD40-2 units were added to the roster between 1979 and 1980.

== Heritage unit ==
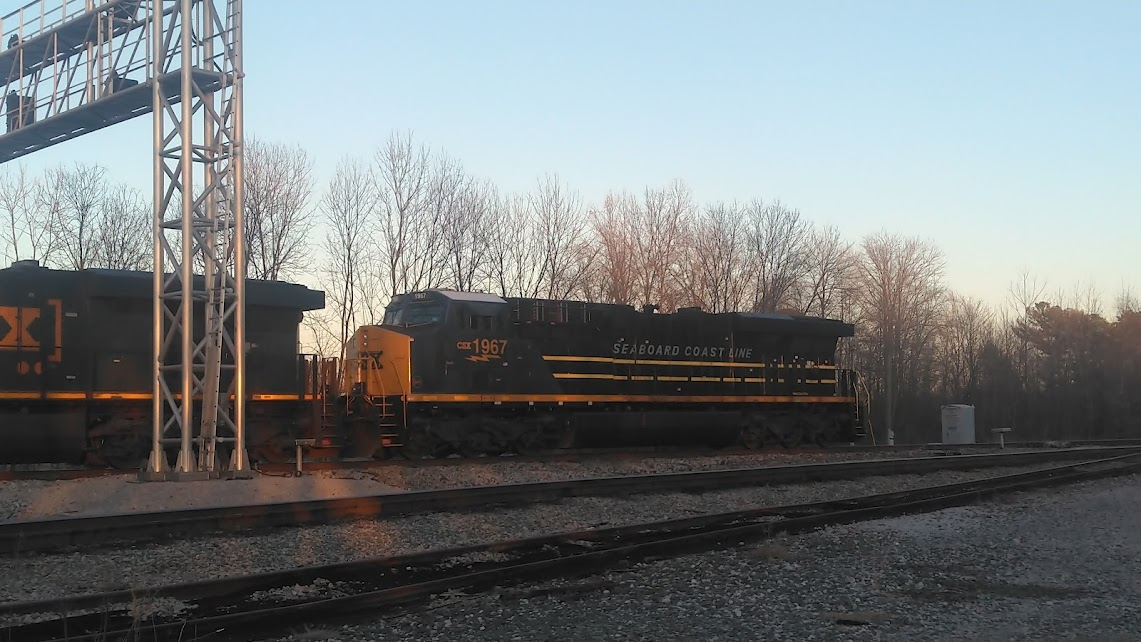
CSX locomotive 1967, a GE ES44AH Seaboard Coast Line Railroad heritage unit locomotive in Guthrie, Kentucky.

On May 21, 2024, CSX unveiled GE ES44AH No. 1967 (ex-CSXT 3062), being repainted at the CSX paint shops in Waycross, GA. The unit is designed with the cab staying in YN3C and the long hood being painted in the SCL black and yellow. It was numbered #1967 in homage to the year the Seaboard Coastline was created.

== See also ==
- Amtrak
- Auto Train
- GP16
- Juice Train
