= Roane County, Tennessee =

County in Tennessee, United States

- County
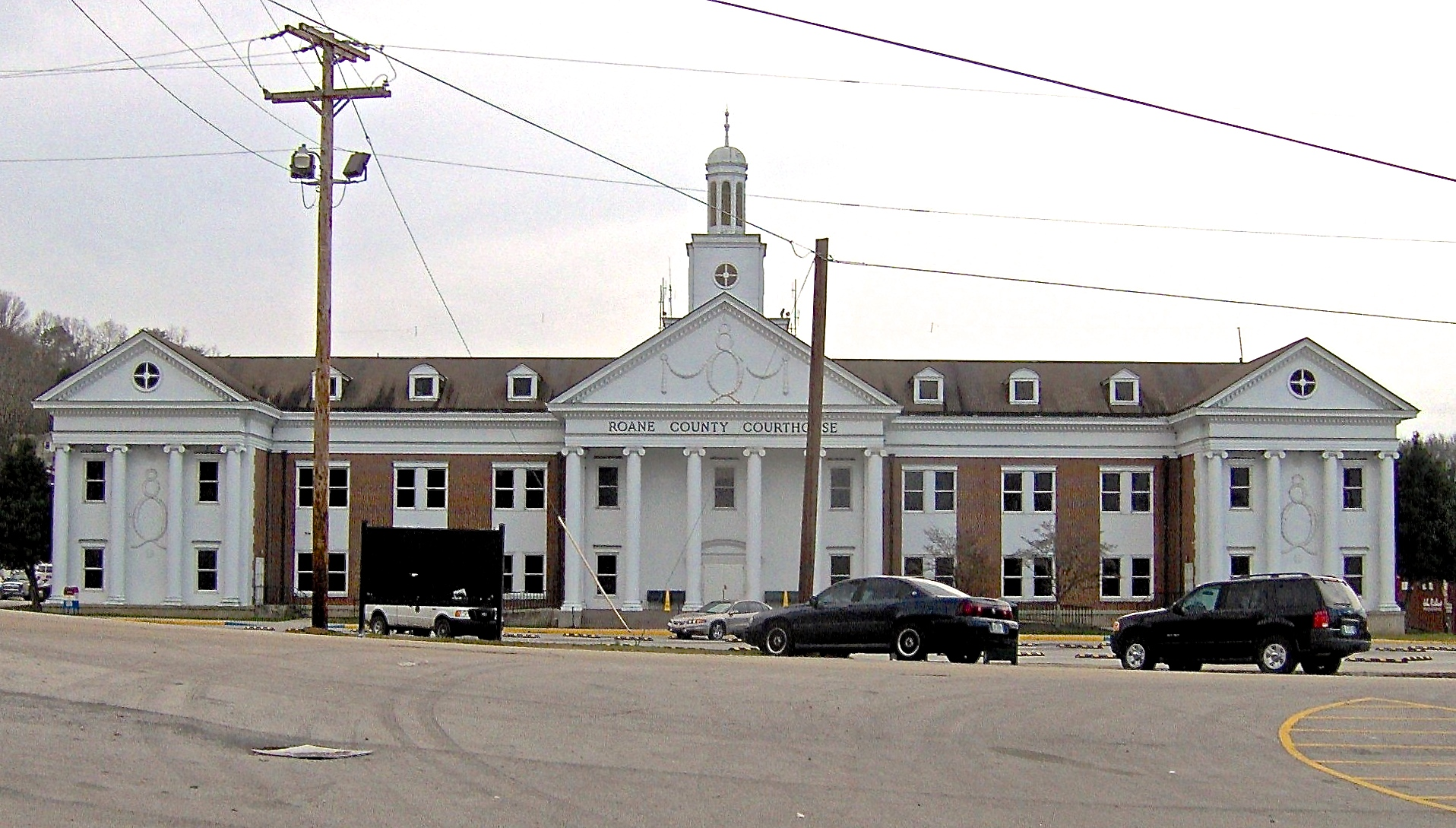
- Roane County Courthouse in Kingston

- Location within the U.S. state of Tennessee
- Coordinates: 35°52′12″N 84°30′06″W
- Country: United States
- State: Tennessee
- Founded: 1801
- Named for: Archibald Roane
- Seat: Kingston
- Largest city: Oak Ridge

Area
  - Total: 395 sq mi (1,020 km^{2})
  - Land: 361 sq mi (930 km^{2})
  - Water: 34 sq mi (88 km^{2}) 8.7%

Population (2020)
  - Total: 53,404
  - Estimate (2025): 57,395 ▲
  - Density: 150/sq mi (58/km^{2})
- Time zone: UTC−5 (Eastern)
  - Summer (DST): UTC−4 (EDT)
- Congressional district: 3rd
- Website: roanecountytn.gov

Roane County is a county of the U.S. state of Tennessee. As of the 2020 census, the population was 53,404. Its county seat is Kingston. Roane County is included in the Knoxville metropolitan area.

== History ==
Roane County was formed in 1801, and named for Archibald Roane, the second Governor of Tennessee. Upon the creation of the Southwest Territory in 1790, the territory's governor, William Blount, initially wanted to locate the territorial capital at the mouth of the Clinch River, but was unable to obtain title to the land from the Cherokee. Kingston, Roane's county seat, is rooted in Fort Southwest Point, a frontier fort constructed in the early 1790s.

During the Civil War, Roane County, like many East Tennessee counties, was largely pro-Union. When Tennessee voted on the Ordinance of Secession on June 8, 1861, Roane Countians voted 1,568 to 454 in favor of remaining in the Union. In October 1861, Union guerrilla William B. Carter organized the East Tennessee bridge-burning conspiracy from a command post in Kingston. During the Knoxville Campaign in December 1863, a Union force led by General James G. Spears scattered a small Confederate force led by John R. Hart near Kingston.

In the years following the Civil War, Rockwood grew into a major iron and coal mining center with the establishment of the Roane Iron Company by General John T. Wilder. Iron ore and coal were mined on Walden Ridge and shipped to Rockwood, where the ore was converted into pig iron. The pig iron was then shipped to rolling mills in Knoxville or Chattanooga.

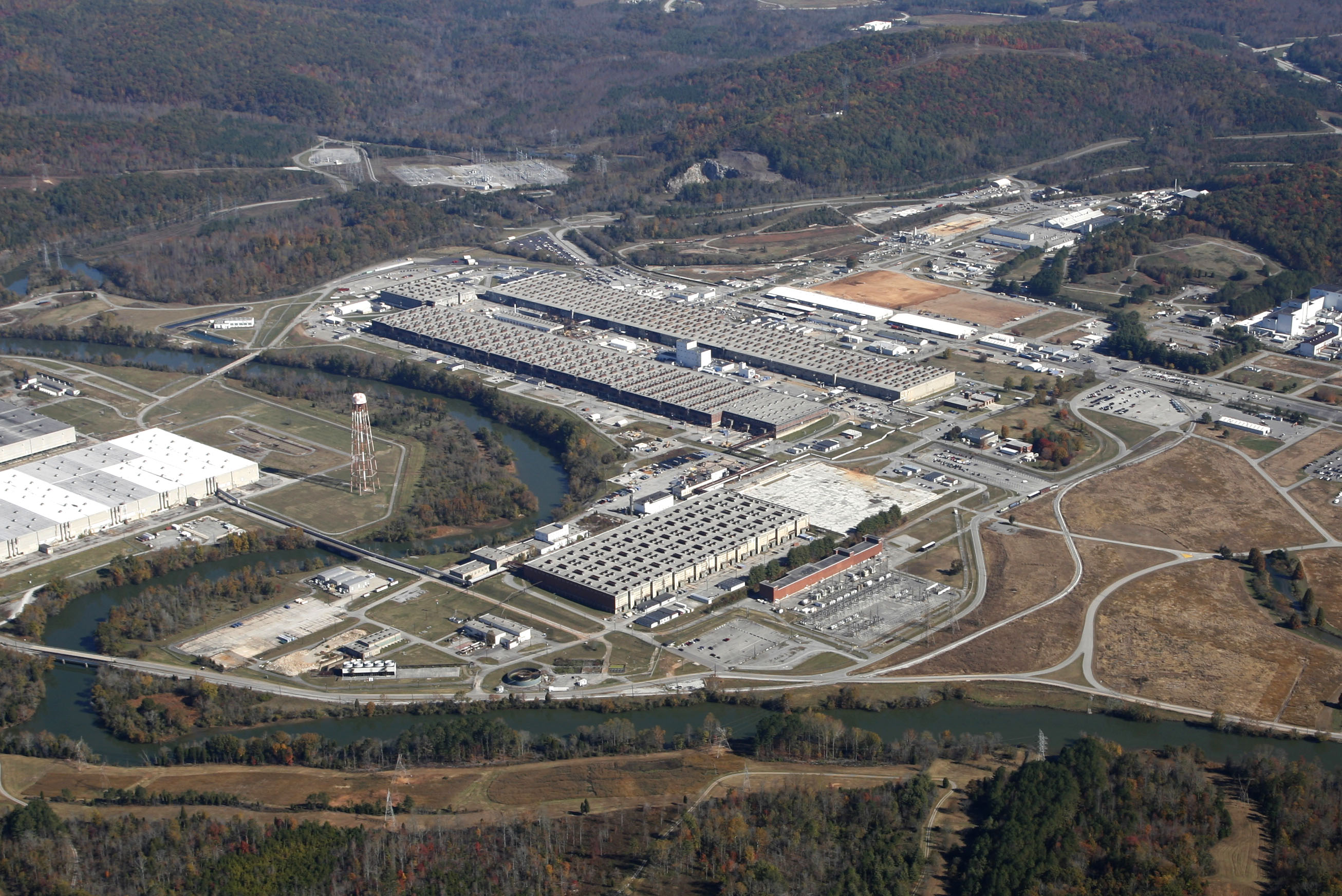
K-25, site of uranium enrichment for the "Little Boy" bomb dropped on Hiroshima

During the late 19th century, northern investors established two planned cities in Roane County— Cardiff and Harriman. Cardiff, located northeast of Rockwood, was planned as a company town to support several proposed mining industries in the area. Harriman was planned as a Temperance Town. Both ventures suffered critical setbacks as a result of the Panic of 1893. Harriman survived, but never grew in the manner its planners had envisioned, while Cardiff failed altogether. During World War II, the federal government created the city of Oak Ridge as a planned community as part of the Manhattan Project to develop the atomic bomb. As a result of the Project, both the K-25 gaseous diffusion plant and the Oak Ridge National Laboratory are located in the county.

== Geography ==
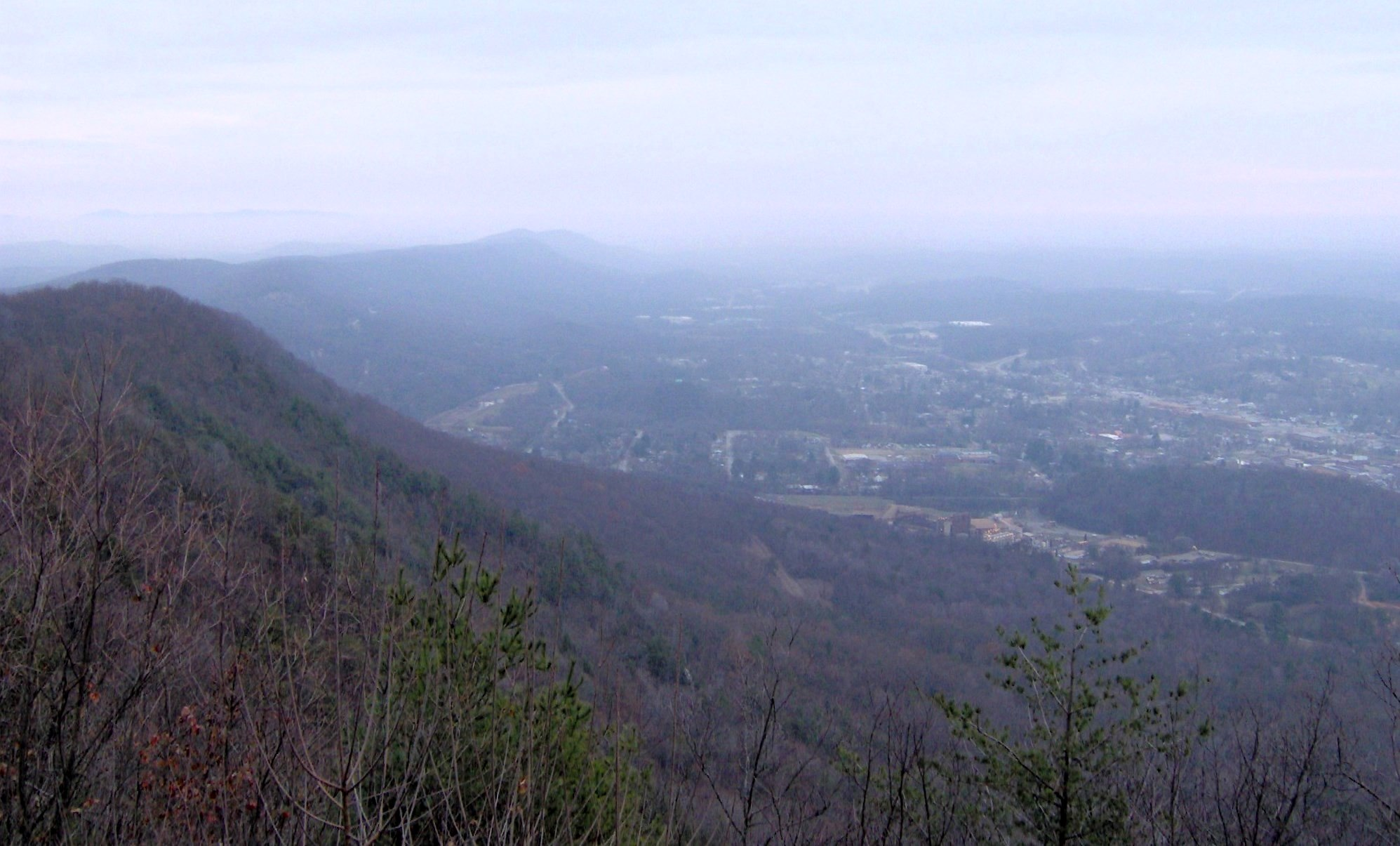
Walden Ridge, with lower Roane County on the right

According to the U.S. Census Bureau, the county has a total area of 395 square miles (1,020 km^{2}), of which 361 square miles (930 km^{2}) is land and 34 square miles (88 km^{2}) (8.7%) is water. Three rivers— the Tennessee River, the Clinch River, and the Emory River— pass through Roane County. The Emory empties into the Clinch near Kingston, and the Clinch empties into the Tennessee just downstream from Kingston. The rivers in Roane are mostly part of Watts Bar Lake. One notable valley is Suck-egg Hollow.

Roane County straddles the geographical boundary between the Tennessee Valley and the Cumberland Plateau, with the latter's Walden Ridge escarpment visible from much of the county.

The county is in the Eastern Time Zone, but Cumberland County, which forms part of its western border, observes Central Time.

=== Adjacent counties ===
- Morgan County (north)
- Anderson County (northeast)
- Knox County (east)
- Loudon County (southeast)
- McMinn County (south)
- Meigs County (southwest)
- Rhea County (southwest)
- Cumberland County (west)

=== State protected areas ===
- Campbell Bend Barrens State Natural Area
- Crowder Cemetery State Natural Area
- Kingston Refuge
- McGlothin-Largen Wildlife Management Area
- Mount Roosevelt Wildlife Management Area (part)
- Paint Rock Refuge
- Watts Bar Wildlife Management Area

== Demographics ==
Historical population
Census	Pop.	Note	%±
1810	5,581		—
1820	7,895		41.5%
1830	11,341		43.6%
1840	10,948		−3.5%
1850	12,185		11.3%
1860	13,583		11.5%
1870	15,622		15.0%
1880	15,237		−2.5%
1890	17,418		14.3%
1900	22,738		30.5%
1910	22,860		0.5%
1920	24,624		7.7%
1930	24,477		−0.6%
1940	27,795		13.6%
1950	31,665		13.9%
1960	39,133		23.6%
1970	38,831		−0.8%
1980	48,425		24.7%
1990	47,227		−2.5%
2000	51,910		9.9%
2010	54,181		4.4%
2020	53,404		−1.4%
2025 (est.)	57,395	▲	7.5%
U.S. Decennial Census; 1790-1960 1900-1990; 1990-2000 2010-2014

=== Racial and ethnic composition ===
Roane County, Tennessee – Racial and ethnic composition Note: the US Census treats Hispanic/Latino as an ethnic category. This table excludes Latinos from the racial categories and assigns them to a separate category. Hispanics/Latinos may be of any race.
Race / Ethnicity (NH = Non-Hispanic)	Pop 1980	Pop 1990	Pop 2000	Pop 2010	Pop 2020	% 1980	% 1990	% 2000	% 2010	% 2020
White alone (NH)	46,479	45,274	49,199	50,752	48,094	95.98%	95.86%	94.78%	93.67%	90.06%
Black or African American alone (NH)	1,510	1,456	1,405	1,430	1,302	3.12%	3.08%	2.71%	2.64%	2.44%
Native American or Alaska Native alone (NH)	39	95	110	167	161	0.08%	0.20%	0.21%	0.31%	0.30%
Asian alone (NH)	107	186	207	274	341	0.22%	0.39%	0.40%	0.51%	0.64%
Native Hawaiian or Pacific Islander alone (NH)	x	x	15	15	19	x	x	0.03%	0.03%	0.04%
Other race alone (NH)	8	4	20	24	157	0.02%	0.01%	0.04%	0.04%	0.29%
Mixed race or Multiracial (NH)	x	x	595	809	2,319	x	x	1.15%	1.49%	4.34%
Hispanic or Latino (any race)	282	212	359	710	1,011	0.58%	0.45%	0.69%	1.31%	1.89%
Total	48,425	47,227	51,910	54,181	53,404	100.00%	100.00%	100.00%	100.00%	100.00%

=== 2000 census ===
As of the 2020 census, there were 53,404 people and 22,322 households in the county.

The median age was 47.3 years, with 19.5% of residents under the age of 18 and 23.4% 65 years of age or older; for every 100 females there were 96.3 males, and for every 100 females age 18 and over there were 93.2 males age 18 and over.

The racial makeup of the county was 90.7% White, 2.4% Black or African American, 0.4% American Indian and Alaska Native, 0.6% Asian, <0.1% Native Hawaiian and Pacific Islander, 0.8% from some other race, and 5.0% from two or more races. Hispanic or Latino residents of any race comprised 1.9% of the population.

47.9% of residents lived in urban areas, while 52.1% lived in rural areas.

There were 25,374 housing units, of which 12.0% were vacant. Among occupied housing units, 75.0% were owner-occupied and 25.0% were renter-occupied. The homeowner vacancy rate was 1.8% and the rental vacancy rate was 9.4%.

=== 2010 census ===
As of the census of 2010, there were 54,181 people, 22,376 households, and 15,450 families residing in the county. The population density was 150 people per square mile (58 people/km^{2}). There were 25,716 housing units at an average density of 71 units per square mile (27/km^{2}).

There were 22,376 households, out of which 23.9% had children under the age of 18 living with them, 53.8% were married couples living together, 10.9% had a female householder with no husband present, and 31% were non-families. 26.9% of all households were made up of individuals, and 12.2% had someone living alone who was 65 years of age or older. The average household size was 2.39 and the average family size was 2.88.

In the county, the population was spread out, with 20.8% under the age of 18 and 18.6% who were 65 years of age or older. The median age was 44.9 years. For every 100 females there were 96.6 males. For every 100 females age 18 and over, there were 92.85 males.

The Census Bureau has defined the Harriman-Kingston-Rockwood area as a contiguous urban cluster.

=== 2000 census ===
As of the census of 2000, the median income for a household in the county was $33,226, and the median income for a family was $41,399. Males had a median income of $32,204 versus $22,439 for females. The per capita income for the county was $18,456. About 10.30% of families and 13.90% of the population were below the poverty line, including 18.80% of those under age 18 and 13.80% of those age 65 or over.

== Media ==
Several movies have been filmed in Roane County, including Boys of Summerville, That Evening Sun and October Sky. Roane County was the childhood home of actress Megan Fox, who lived in Kingston. She attended elementary school, took dance classes, and was on the swim team in Roane County. The 2010 film, Get Low, starring Bill Murray, Robert Duvall, and Sissy Spacek, was based on the true story of a Roane County man, Felix Breazeale. Breazeale was a local hermit who opted to throw himself a funeral while he was still alive. The funeral intrigued many, making it a gathering of thousands. Roane County has produced thousands of successful athletes. One of Roane County's most recent athletes is Tyler Thompson of Kingston. Thompson played Division I basketball in the Ohio Valley Conference for Tennessee Technological University.

== Communities ==
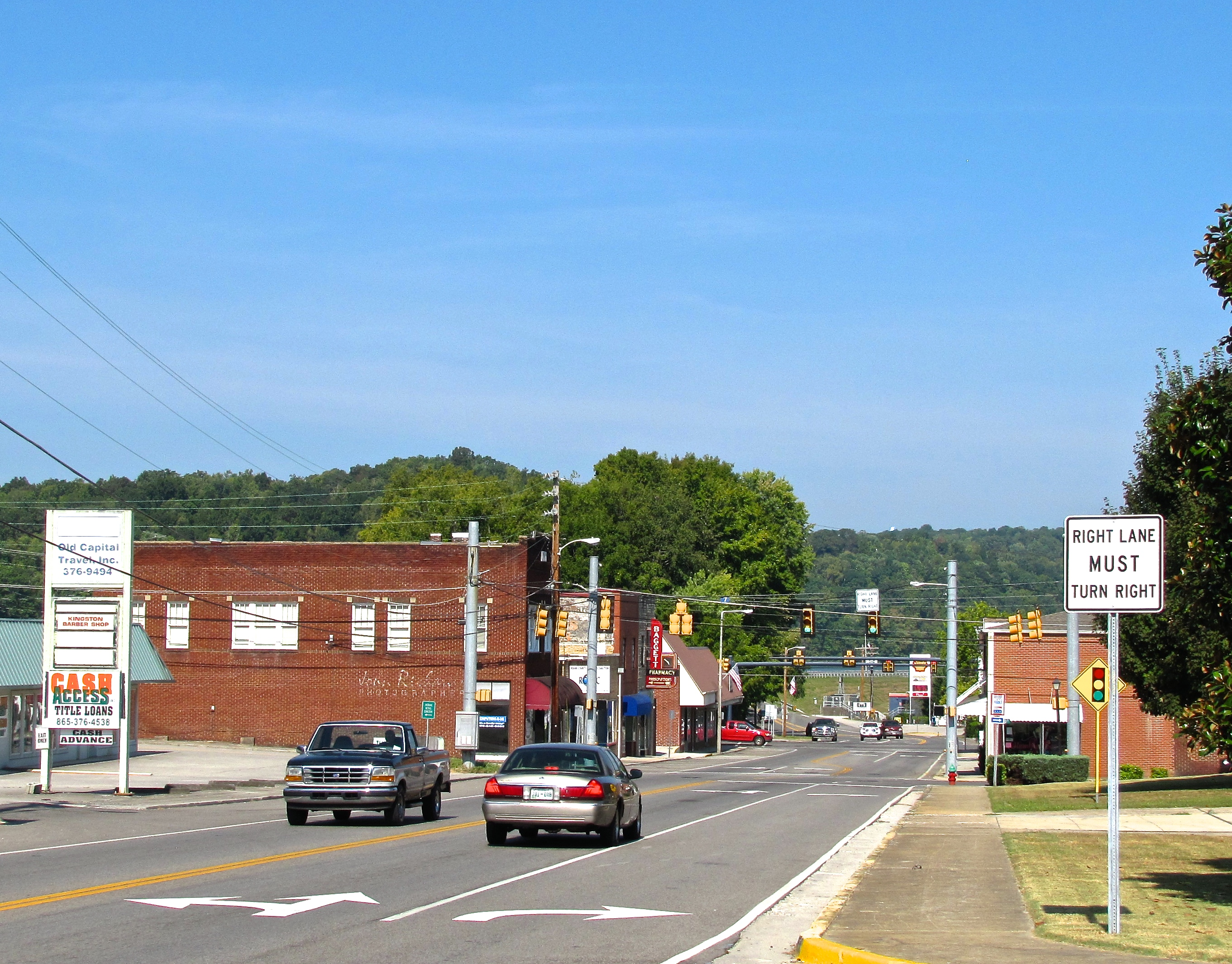
Kingston

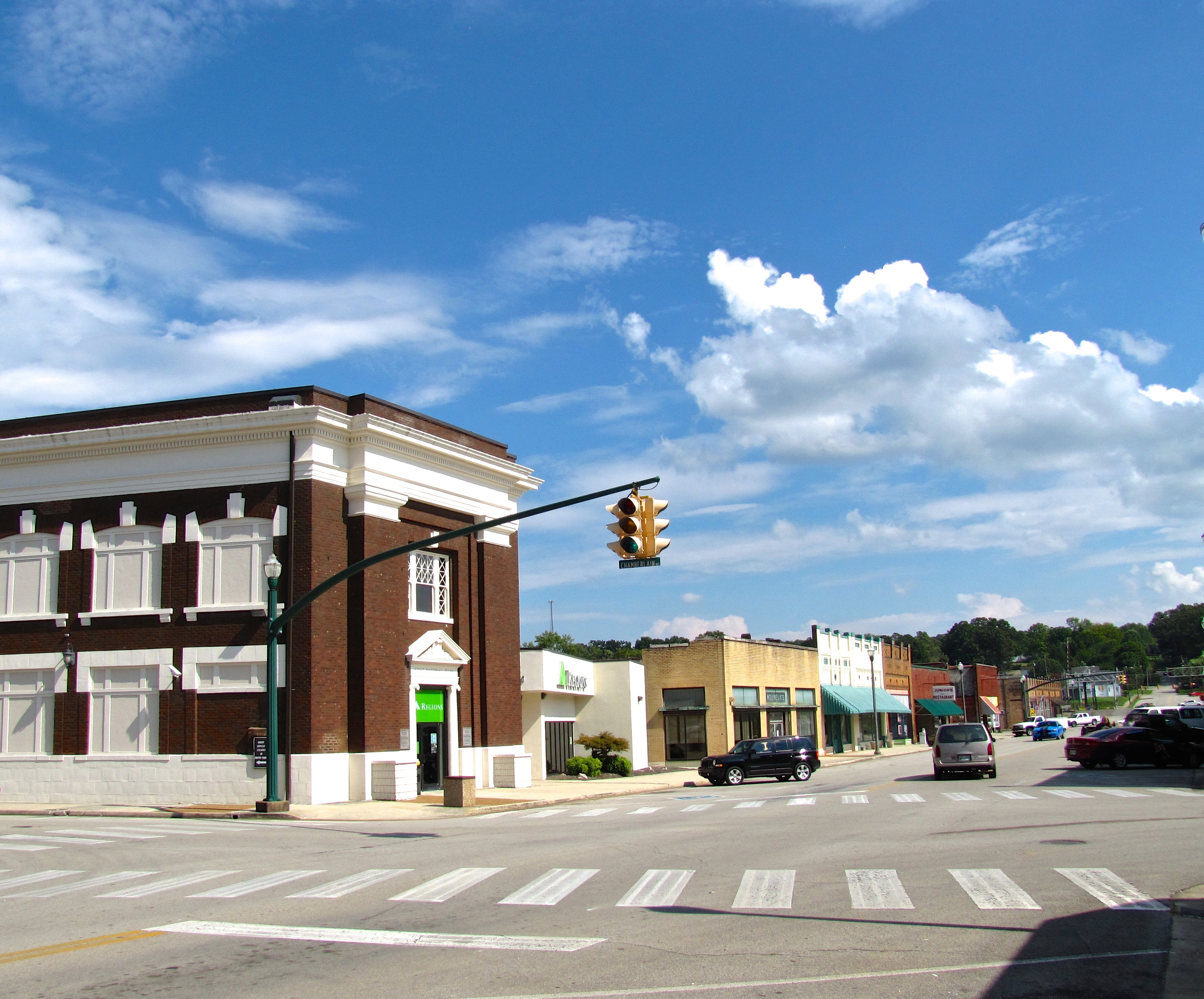
Rockwood

=== Cities ===
- Harriman (small part in Morgan County)
- Kingston (county seat)
- Oak Ridge (partial)
- Rockwood
- Lenoir City (partial)

=== Town ===
- Oliver Springs (partial)

=== Census-designated place ===
- Midtown

=== Unincorporated communities ===
- Blair
- Cave Creek
- Cedar Grove
- Midway
- Paint Rock
- Postoak
- Ten Mile (partial)

=== Former communities ===
- Cardiff
- Wheat

== Politics ==
United States presidential election results for Roane County, Tennessee
Year	Republican		Democratic		Third party(ies)	
Year	No.	%	No.	%	No.	%
1912	482	24.74%	570	29.26%	896	46.00%
1916	1,341	64.66%	667	32.16%	66	3.18%
1920	1,974	70.20%	838	29.80%	0	0.00%
1924	1,635	63.45%	795	30.85%	147	5.70%
1928	2,955	79.14%	755	20.22%	24	0.64%
1932	2,036	54.89%	1,625	43.81%	48	1.29%
1936	2,757	52.66%	2,467	47.13%	11	0.21%
1940	2,245	48.28%	2,384	51.27%	21	0.45%
1944	2,711	57.69%	1,971	41.95%	17	0.36%
1948	3,236	55.98%	2,306	39.89%	239	4.13%
1952	5,583	60.13%	3,702	39.87%	0	0.00%
1956	6,147	56.82%	4,531	41.88%	140	1.29%
1960	6,540	56.25%	4,953	42.60%	133	1.14%
1964	5,735	48.43%	6,108	51.57%	0	0.00%
1968	6,033	45.74%	3,258	24.70%	3,898	29.55%
1972	8,742	70.10%	3,433	27.53%	295	2.37%
1976	7,121	43.18%	9,216	55.89%	154	0.93%
1980	11,096	61.03%	6,473	35.60%	613	3.37%
1984	11,882	63.83%	6,623	35.58%	109	0.59%
1988	10,881	62.19%	6,535	37.35%	81	0.46%
1992	8,719	41.52%	9,812	46.73%	2,468	11.75%
1996	9,044	44.15%	9,744	47.57%	1,697	8.28%
2000	11,345	53.20%	9,575	44.90%	406	1.90%
2004	14,467	61.99%	8,706	37.30%	165	0.71%
2008	15,658	67.27%	7,224	31.04%	394	1.69%
2012	14,724	69.82%	6,018	28.53%	348	1.65%
2016	15,880	73.28%	4,837	22.32%	952	4.39%
2020	19,230	74.20%	6,043	23.32%	644	2.48%
2024	21,011	76.65%	6,073	22.15%	328	1.20%

Similar to other counties in Eastern Tennessee, Roane County has more often than not voted for Republican presidential candidates. In only five elections beginning in 1916 has the county not voted for the Republican candidate.

== See also ==
- Roane County High School
- National Register of Historic Places listings in Roane County, Tennessee
