= Kingston, Tennessee =

- City
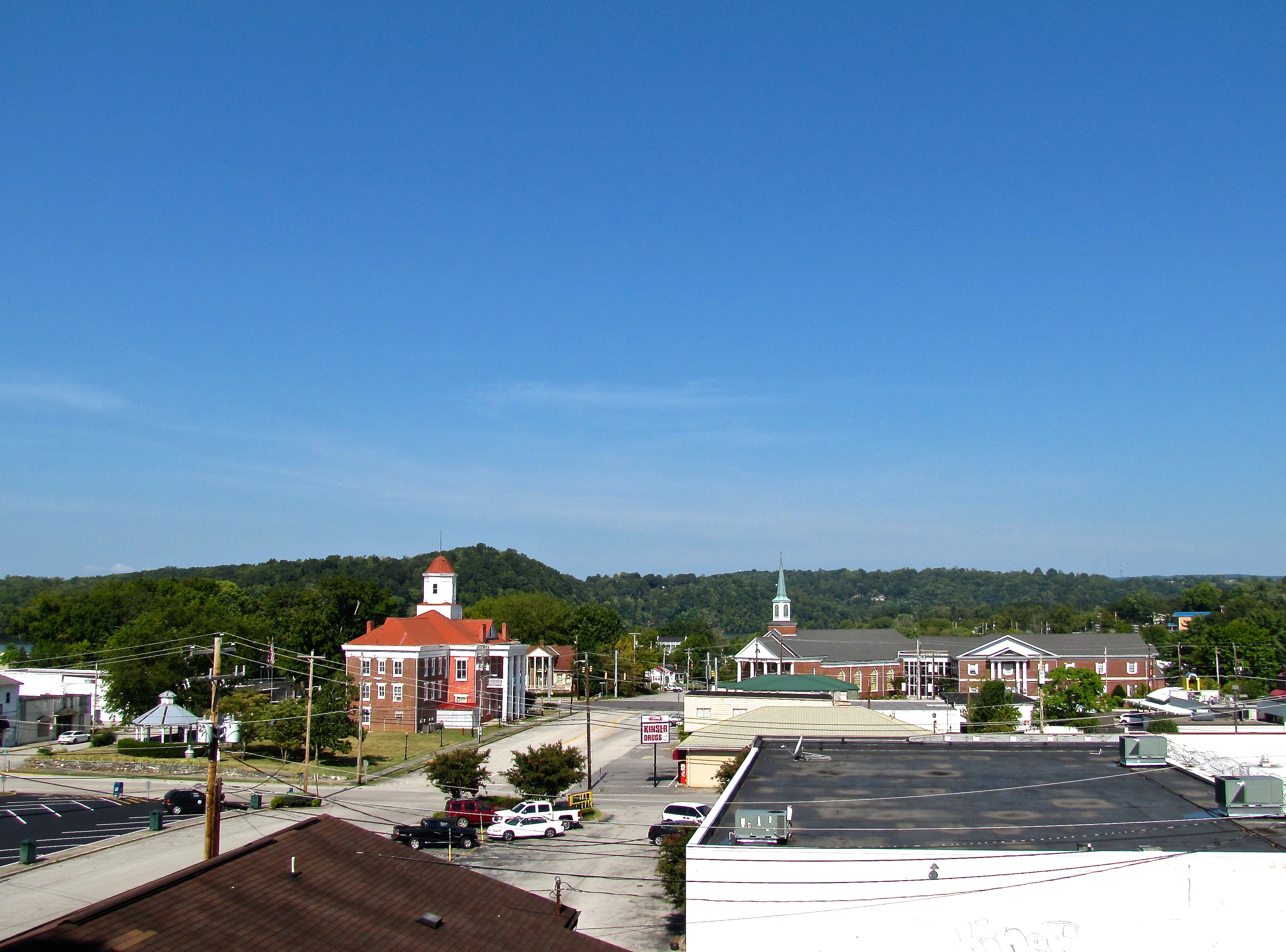
- Kingston

- Flag Logo

- Location of Kingston in Roane County, Tennessee.
- Coordinates: 35°52′51″N 84°30′31″W
- Country: United States
- State: Tennessee
- County: Roane
- Settled: 1792
- Incorporated: 1799
- Named for: Maj. Robert King, officer at Fort Southwest Point

Area
  - Total: 8.18 sq mi (21.18 km^{2})
  - Land: 7.29 sq mi (18.88 km^{2})
  - Water: 0.89 sq mi (2.30 km^{2})
- Elevation: 764 ft (233 m)

Population (2020)
  - Total: 5,953
  - Density: 816.6/sq mi (315.31/km^{2})
- Time zone: UTC-5 (Eastern (EST))
  - Summer (DST): UTC-4 (EDT)
- ZIP code: 37763
- Area code: 865
- FIPS code: 47-39620
- Website: City website

Kingston is a city in and the county seat of Roane County, Tennessee, United States. This city is thirty-six miles southwest of Knoxville. As of the 2020 census, Kingston had a population of 5,953. It is included in the Harriman, Tennessee Micropolitan Statistical Area. Kingston is adjacent to Watts Bar Lake.

== History ==
Kingston has its roots in Fort Southwest Point, which was built just south of present-day Kingston in 1792. At the time, Southwest Point was on the fringe of the legal settlement area for Euro-Americans. A Cherokee village, headed by Chief Tollunteeskee, was situated just across the river, at what is now Rockwood. In 1805, Colonel Return J. Meigs, who operated out of Southwest Point, was appointed Cherokee Agent, effectively moving the agency from the Tellico Blockhouse to Southwest Point. The city of Kingston was established on October 23, 1799, as part of an effort to partition Knox County (the initial effort to form a separate county failed, but succeeded two years later). Kingston was named after Major Robert King, an officer at Fort Southwest Point in the 1790s.

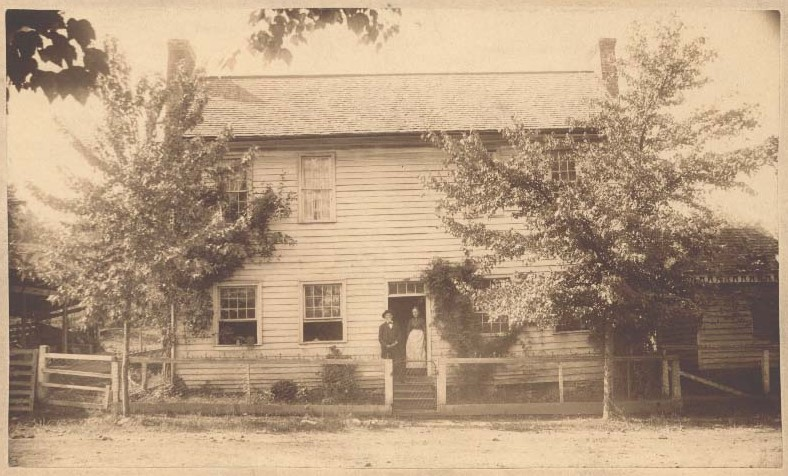
Building in Kingston used briefly as Tennessee's state capitol in 1807, photographed in 1889

On September 21, 1807, Kingston was Tennessee's state capital for one day. The Tennessee General Assembly convened in Kingston that day due to an agreement with the Cherokee, who had been told that if the Cherokee Nation ceded the land that is now Roane County, Kingston would become the capital of Tennessee. After adjourning that day, the Assembly resumed meeting in Knoxville.

At the outset of the Civil War in 1861, Kingston was selected as the site of the third session of the East Tennessee Convention, which attempted to form a new, Union-aligned state in East Tennessee. Due to the Confederate occupation of the region, however, this third session, which was scheduled for August 1861, never took place. In October 1861, William B. Carter and several co-conspirators planned the East Tennessee bridge burnings from a command post in Kingston. On November 24, 1863, Confederate Cavalry under Joseph Wheeler numbering about 500–1,000 men tried to take Kingston from the Union in the Battle of Kingston, but they were unsuccessful.

In 1955, the Tennessee Valley Authority completed work on the Kingston Fossil Plant, which at the time was the world's largest coal-burning power plant. The plant, which consumes roughly 14,000 short tons (13,000 t) of coal daily, can produce up to 1,456 megawatts of electricity. The plant's 1,000-foot (305 m) smokestacks are a familiar sight to those driving on the Roane County stretch of Interstate 40. On December 22, 2008, a 40-acre (0.16 km^{2}) impoundment containing fly ash slurry from the power plant broke, spilling more than 1 billion US gallons (3,800,000 m^{3}) of waste into the surrounding area.

== Geography ==
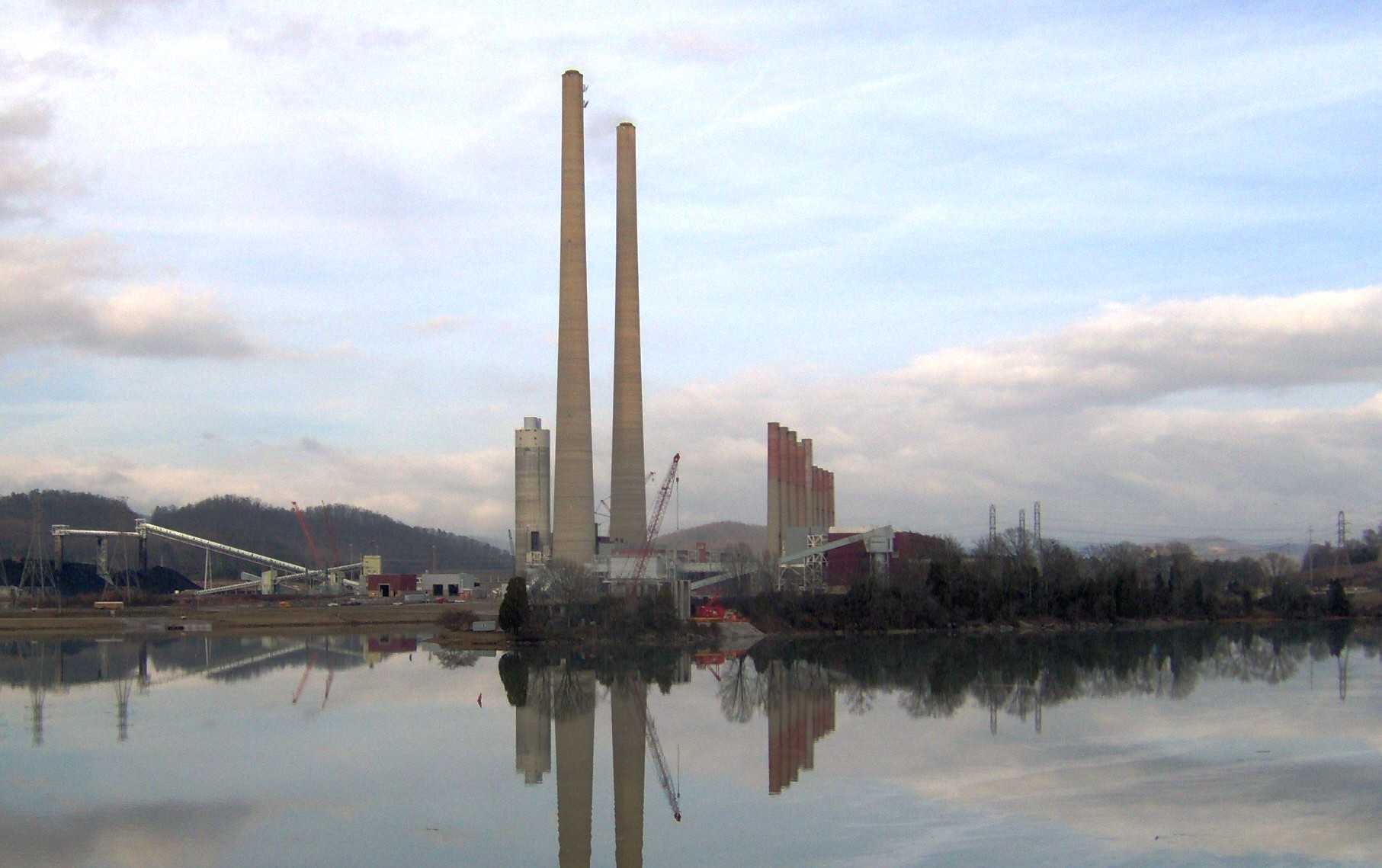
The Kingston power plant

The town is situated at the confluence of the Clinch, Emory, and Tennessee rivers. These confluences are now part of Watts Bar Lake, a reservoir created by the impoundment of the Tennessee by Watts Bar Dam several miles to the southwest.

Kingston is located near the junction of U.S. Route 70, which connects Kingston with Knoxville to the east and Nashville to the west, and State Route 58, which connects Kingston with Oak Ridge to the northeast and Chattanooga to the south. Interstate 40 passes through Kingston, running roughly parallel to U.S. 70.

According to the United States Census Bureau, the city has a total area of 7.8 square miles (20.3 km^{2}), of which 7.1 square miles (18.4 km^{2}) is land and 0.73 square miles (1.9 km^{2}), or 9.56%, is water.

=== Climate ===
Climate data for Kingston, Tennessee, 1991–2020 normals, extremes 2000–present
Month	Jan	Feb	Mar	Apr	May	Jun	Jul	Aug	Sep	Oct	Nov	Dec	Year
Record high °F (°C)	74 (23)	81 (27)	86 (30)	89 (32)	94 (34)	104 (40)	106 (41)	102 (39)	99 (37)	95 (35)	84 (29)	75 (24)	106 (41)
Mean maximum °F (°C)	65.6 (18.7)	70.4 (21.3)	79.1 (26.2)	85.1 (29.5)	89.1 (31.7)	94.4 (34.7)	95.4 (35.2)	94.5 (34.7)	92.0 (33.3)	85.1 (29.5)	74.1 (23.4)	67.5 (19.7)	96.9 (36.1)
Mean daily maximum °F (°C)	46.3 (7.9)	51.2 (10.7)	60.5 (15.8)	70.4 (21.3)	78.1 (25.6)	85.0 (29.4)	87.7 (30.9)	87.1 (30.6)	82.1 (27.8)	71.6 (22.0)	58.8 (14.9)	49.0 (9.4)	69.0 (20.5)
Daily mean °F (°C)	37.1 (2.8)	40.8 (4.9)	48.9 (9.4)	58.0 (14.4)	66.9 (19.4)	74.6 (23.7)	77.8 (25.4)	77.0 (25.0)	71.5 (21.9)	59.9 (15.5)	48.1 (8.9)	40.3 (4.6)	58.4 (14.7)
Mean daily minimum °F (°C)	27.9 (−2.3)	30.4 (−0.9)	37.2 (2.9)	45.6 (7.6)	55.7 (13.2)	64.2 (17.9)	68.0 (20.0)	66.8 (19.3)	61.0 (16.1)	48.2 (9.0)	37.4 (3.0)	31.6 (−0.2)	47.8 (8.8)
Mean minimum °F (°C)	11.9 (−11.2)	17.4 (−8.1)	22.6 (−5.2)	31.9 (−0.1)	40.2 (4.6)	54.6 (12.6)	59.7 (15.4)	59.5 (15.3)	49.8 (9.9)	33.9 (1.1)	23.7 (−4.6)	19.5 (−6.9)	10.4 (−12.0)
Record low °F (°C)	0 (−18)	3 (−16)	15 (−9)	25 (−4)	32 (0)	47 (8)	54 (12)	53 (12)	40 (4)	29 (−2)	16 (−9)	3 (−16)	0 (−18)
Average precipitation inches (mm)	5.46 (139)	5.95 (151)	5.37 (136)	5.46 (139)	4.66 (118)	4.72 (120)	5.21 (132)	3.90 (99)	4.27 (108)	3.22 (82)	4.54 (115)	6.05 (154)	58.81 (1,493)
Average snowfall inches (cm)	1.1 (2.8)	0.6 (1.5)	0.0 (0.0)	0.0 (0.0)	0.0 (0.0)	0.0 (0.0)	0.0 (0.0)	0.0 (0.0)	0.0 (0.0)	0.0 (0.0)	0.0 (0.0)	0.1 (0.25)	1.8 (4.55)
Average precipitation days (≥ 0.01 in)	10.1	10.2	10.7	9.9	9.8	11.3	11.0	8.8	7.3	7.4	8.5	10.4	115.4
Average snowy days (≥ 0.1 in)	0.5	0.3	0.0	0.0	0.0	0.0	0.0	0.0	0.0	0.0	0.1	0.1	1.0
Source 1: NOAA
Source 2: National Weather Service (mean maxima/minima 2006–2020)

== Demographics ==
Historical population
Census	Pop.	Note	%±
1850	386		—
1860	307		−20.5%
1870	739		140.7%
1880	858		16.1%
1900	548		—
1910	824		50.4%
1920	516		−37.4%
1930	827		60.3%
1940	880		6.4%
1950	1,627		84.9%
1960	2,010		23.5%
1970	4,142		106.1%
1980	4,441		7.2%
1990	4,552		2.5%
2000	5,264		15.6%
2010	5,934		12.7%
2020	5,953		0.3%

=== 2020 census ===
As of the 2020 census, Kingston had a population of 5,953, 2,561 households, and 1,335 families residing in the city.

The median age was 45.9 years, 19.0% of residents were under the age of 18, and 24.9% were 65 years of age or older. For every 100 females there were 90.8 males, and for every 100 females age 18 and over there were 85.1 males age 18 and over.

96.3% of residents lived in urban areas, while 3.7% lived in rural areas.

Of the 2,561 households in Kingston, 25.2% had children under the age of 18 living in them. Of all households, 45.3% were married-couple households, 17.7% were households with a male householder and no spouse or partner present, and 31.4% were households with a female householder and no spouse or partner present. About 31.9% of all households were made up of individuals and 16.7% had someone living alone who was 65 years of age or older.

There were 2,775 housing units, of which 7.7% were vacant. The homeowner vacancy rate was 1.8% and the rental vacancy rate was 7.1%.

Racial composition as of the 2020 census
Race	Number	Percent
White	5,350	89.9%
Black or African American	203	3.4%
American Indian and Alaska Native	18	0.3%
Asian	56	0.9%
Native Hawaiian and Other Pacific Islander	2	0.0%
Some other race	45	0.8%
Two or more races	279	4.7%
Hispanic or Latino (of any race)	132	2.2%

=== 2000 census ===
As of the census of 2000, there was a population of 5,264, with 2,263 households and 1,532 families residing in the city. The population density was 803.7 inhabitants per square mile (310.3/km^{2}). There were 2,478 housing units at an average density of 378.4 per square mile (146.1/km^{2}). The racial makeup of the city was 93.75% White, 3.55% African American, 0.23% Native American, 0.49% Asian, 0.06% Pacific Islander, 0.23% from other races, and 1.69% from two or more races. Hispanic or Latino of any race were 0.97% of the population.

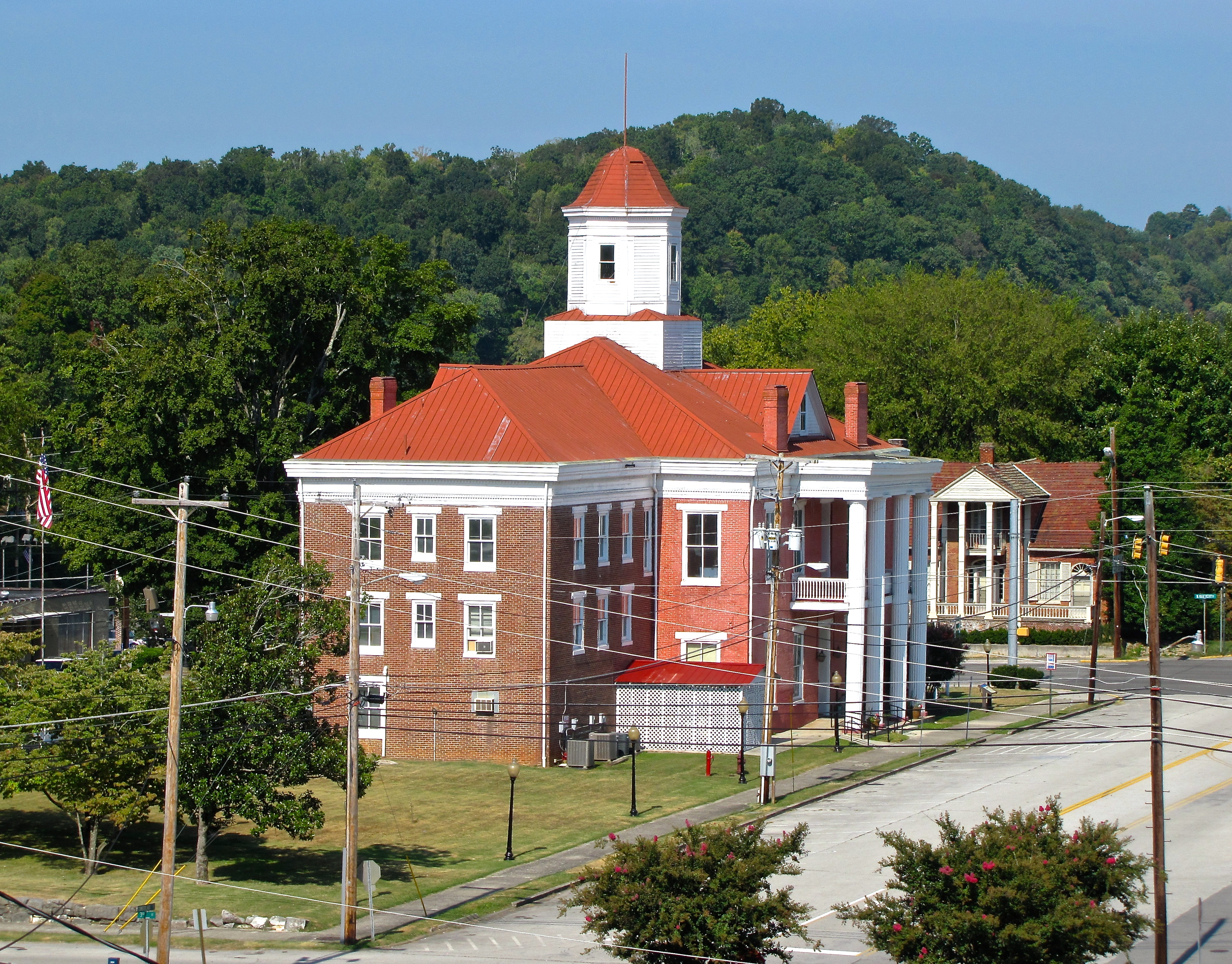
The Old Courthouse in Kingston, built in the 1850s

There were 2,263 households, out of which 26.0% had children under the age of 18 living with them, 54.3% were married couples living together, 10.8% had a female householder with no husband present, and 32.3% were non-families. 29.6% of all households were made up of individuals, and 14.8% had someone living alone who was 65 years of age or older. The average household size was 2.25 and the average family size was 2.77.

In the city, the population was spread out, with 20.5% under the age of 18, 8.2% from 18 to 24, 26.0% from 25 to 44, 24.8% from 45 to 64, and 20.4% who were 65 years of age or older. The median age was 42 years. For every 100 females there were 88.8 males. For every 100 females age 18 and over, there were 87.0 males.

The median income for a household in the city was $34,071, and the median income for a family was $44,979. Males had a median income of $40,186 versus $22,971 for females. The per capita income for the city was $20,301. About 6.0% of families and 10.0% of the population were below the poverty line, including 16.6% of those under age 18 and 8.9% of those age 65 or over.

== Newspapers ==
Roane County News

== Notable people ==
- Robert K. Byrd (1823–1885), Union Army colonel and state senator
- George Lewis Gillespie, Jr. (1841–1913), U.S. Army general and Medal of Honor recipient
- Jennie Jackson (1852–1910), one of the original Fisk Jubilee Singers
- Martin W. Littleton (1872–1934), U.S. congressman and attorney, known for defending Harry Thaw at his murder trial
- Sam Rayburn (1882–1961), U.S. congressman and Speaker of the House
- Bowden Wyatt (1917–1969), University of Tennessee football coach
- Wil Crowe (1994–), Professional baseball player for the Pittsburgh Pirates
