= Tennessee State Route 297 =

State highway in Tennessee, United States

State Route 297
- SR 297 highlighted in red

Route information
- Maintained by TDOT
- Length: 62.0 mi (99.8 km)
- Existed: July 1, 1983–present
- Tourist routes: Cumberland Historic Byway

Major junctions
- West end: SR 154 in Sharp Place
- US 27 in Oneida; SR 63 in Huntsville
- East end: US 25W in Jellico

Location
- Country: United States
- State: Tennessee
- Counties: Fentress, Scott, Campbell

Highway system
- Tennessee State Routes; Interstate; US; State
← SR 296	→ SR 298

State Route 297 (SR 297) is a 62.0-mile-long (99.8 km) east–west secondary state highway in Middle and East Tennessee. It is the primary road in and out of Scott State Forest and Big South Fork National River and Recreation Area, where it is known as Leatherwood Ford Road.

== Route description ==
=== Fentress County ===
SR 297 begins in Fentress County in Middle Tennessee at an intersection with SR 154 in Sharp Place. It winds its way east through farmland as Leatherwood Ford Road, a two-lane highway, to enter wooded areas and Scott State Forest before crossing into Scott County and East Tennessee.

=== Scott County ===
SR 297 then becomes curvy as it passes through Scott State Forest before entering the Big South Fork National River and Recreation Area and crossing the Big South Fork of the Cumberland River. It passes through the park before leaving it and passing through farmland again as Coopertown Road. SR 297 then enters Oneida as W 3rd Avenue, going through neighborhoods before passing some businesses, where it passes by Tennessee College of Applied Technology at Oneida. The highway then makes a sharp right onto Industrial Lane, where it goes through industrial areas, before coming to an intersection with US 27/SR 29 (Alberta Street). SR 297 then becomes concurrent with US 27/SR 29 and they then head south and widen to a four-lane undivided highway and pass through a business district before leaving Oneida. The highway (now Scott Highway) has an interchange for Scott Municipal Airport before passing through Helenwood. They then enter Huntsville and come to an intersection with SR 63 (Howard H. Baker Memorial Highway), where SR 297 splits off from US 27/SR 29 and becomes concurrent with SR 63. They pass by several homes and businesses before passing through downtown. SR 63/SR 297 then narrows to two-lanes as it leaves Huntsville and has an intersection with SR 456. The highway then enters some mountainous terrain before crossing into Campbell County.

=== Campbell County ===
SR 63/SR 297 pass through mountains for several miles before entering Pioneer and coming to an intersection, where SR 297 splits off from SR 63 and heads northeast up the Elk Fork Creek Valley along Newcomb Pike. SR 297 passes through the communities of Elk Valley and Newcomb before entering Jellico and passing by Indian Mountain State Park. It then enters downtown and comes to an end at an intersection with US 25W/SR 9.

== Major intersections ==
County	Location	mi	km	Destinations	Notes
Fentress	Sharp Place	0.0	0.0	SR 154 (Pickett Park Highway) – Jamestown, Pickett CCC Memorial State Park	Western terminus
Scott	Big South Fork National River and Recreation Area	11.1	17.9	Bridge over the Big South Fork of the Cumberland River	
Scott	Oneida	22.1	35.6	US 27 north (Alberta Street/SR 29 north) – Downtown, Winfield	Western end of US 27/SR 29 concurrency
Scott		25.3	40.7	Airport Road - Scott Municipal Airport	Interchange
Scott	Huntsville	28.6	46.0	US 27 south (Scott Highway/SR 29 south) / SR 63 begins – Sunbright, Wartburg	Eastern end of US 27/SR 29 concurrency; western terminus of SR 63; western end of SR 63 concurrency
Scott		34.7	55.8	SR 456 north (Annadell Road) – Oneida	Southern terminus of SR 456
Campbell	Pioneer	44.0	70.8	SR 63 east (Howard H. Baker Memorial Highway) to I-75 – Caryville	Eastern end of SR 63 concurrency
Campbell	Jellico	62.0	99.8	US 25W (N Main Street/5th Street/SR 9) to I-75 – Williamsburg, KY, La Follette	Eastern terminus
1.000 mi = 1.609 km; 1.000 km = 0.621 mi: Concurrency terminus
