= Tennessee State Route 456 =

State highway in Tennessee, United States

State Route 456
- TN 456 highlighted in red

Route information
- Maintained by TDOT
- Length: 10.0 mi (16.1 km)

Major junctions
- South end: SR 63 / SR 297 just east of Huntsville
- North end: US 27 in Oneida

Location
- Country: United States
- State: Tennessee
- Counties: Scott

Highway system
- Tennessee State Routes; Interstate; US; State
← SR 455	→ SR 457

State Route 456 (SR 456) is a 10-mile-long (16 km) north–south state highway in Scott County, Tennessee. It serves as a bypass of Huntsville for traffic on SR 297. It was originally part of SR 297 until it was moved in the 2000s to follow more of SR 63 and part of US 27 in Oneida.

== Route description ==
SR 456 begins at an intersection with SR 63/SR 297 just east of Huntsville, where the road continues south into Winona as Winona Road. It goes north as Annadell Road past businesses, homes, and then farmland to come to an intersection with Paint Rock Road. The highway then turns left onto Paint Rock Road begins to head into mountainous terrain as it goes northwest through a narrow and long valley. It passes through the community of Paint Rock before winding its way northwest through mountains to enter Oneida. SR 456 passes by several businesses and homes before crossing a bridge over a railroad track and entering downtown. It heads west as Depot Street along the south side of downtown before coming to an end at an intersection with US 27/SR 29, just feet from that highway's intersection with SR 297.

== Major intersections ==
The entire route is in Scott County.

Location	mi	km	Destinations	Notes
	0.0	0.0	SR 63 / SR 297 (Baker Highway) to I-75 – Huntsville, Jellico, Caryville	Southern terminus; road continues south as Winona Road
Oneida	10.0	16.1	US 27 (Alberta Street/SR 29) – Huntsville, Winfield	Northern terminus
1.000 mi = 1.609 km; 1.000 km = 0.621 mi
