= Tennessee State Route 154 =

State highway in Tennessee, United States

State Route 154

Route information
- Maintained by TDOT
- Length: 19.12 mi (30.77 km)

Major junctions
- West end: SR 52 near Jamestown
- US 127 in Jamestown
- East end: KY 167 at the Kentucky state line north of Pickett State Park

Location
- Country: United States
- State: Tennessee
- Counties: Fentress, Pickett, Scott

Highway system
- Tennessee State Routes; Interstate; US; State
← SR 153	→ SR 155

State Route 154 (SR 154) is an east–west state highway in Middle and East Tennessee. It is a 19.0 miles (30.6 km) long route that traverses Fentress and Pickett counties in middle Tennessee, along with a tiny portion of Scott County in east Tennessee.

== Route description ==
SR 154 begins in Fentress County just west of Jamestown at a junction with SR 52. The highway enters Jamestown on W Cove Road, where it passes by the Fentress County Fairgrounds, before following the original alignment of US 127/SR 28 (N Main Street) for a short distance and turning right onto Pickett Park Highway and going further northeast to cross the current US 127. It continues northeast through rural countryside to pass through Sharp Place, where it has an intersection with SR 297, before crossing into the easternmost part of Pickett County, and traverses Pickett State Park and Pickett State Forest. It then goes into the northwesternmost corner of Scott County before becoming Kentucky Route 167 at the state line in Wayne County, Kentucky.

== Major intersections ==
County	Location	mi	km	Destinations	Notes
Fentress	Jamestown	0.00	0.00	SR 52 (Livingston Highway) – Jamestown, Livingston	Western terminus
Fentress	Jamestown	1.3	2.1	North Main Street (Old US 127) – Jamestown Business District	
Fentress	Jamestown	1.6	2.6	North Main Street (Old US 127) – Pall Mall	Originally a concurrency with the original US 127/SR 28
Fentress	Jamestown	2.5	4.0	US 127 (SR 28) – Jamestown, Crossville, Pall Mall	Interchange via a two-way access road; provides access to Sgt. Alvin C. York State Historic Park and Jamestown Municipal Airport
Fentress	Sharp Place	10.5	16.9	SR 297 east (Leatherwood Ford Road) – Oneida, Big South Fork National River and Recreation Area	Western terminus of SR 297
Pickett	No major junctions				
Scott		19.0	30.6	KY 167 north – Monticello	Kentucky state line; eastern terminus
1.000 mi = 1.609 km; 1.000 km = 0.621 mi
