= Tennessee State Route 63 =

Highway in Tennessee

State Route 63
- Congressman Howard H. Baker Highway
- SR 63; primary in red, secondary in blue

Route information
- Maintained by TDOT
- Length: 101.06 mi (162.64 km)
- Existed: October 1, 1923–present
- Tourist routes: Cumberland Historic Byway

Major junctions
- West end: US 27 / SR 297 in Huntsville
- I-75 in Pioneer; I-75 / US 25W in Caryville; US 25W in LaFollette; US 25E in Harrogate
- East end: SR 33 in Sneedville

Location
- Country: United States
- State: Tennessee
- Counties: Scott, Campbell, Claiborne, Hancock

Highway system
- Tennessee State Routes; Interstate; US; State
← US 63	→ US 64

State Route 63 (SR 63) is an east–west state highway in the northern portion of East Tennessee. It goes from U.S. Route 27 (US 27) in Huntsville to SR 33 in Sneedville, running 102 miles (164 km).

SR 63 is a primary route west of US 25E in Harrogate; the portion east of the I-75 junction in Caryville is part of Corridor F of the Appalachian Development Highway System, which stretches from Caryville to Jenkins, Kentucky. East of Harrogate, SR 63 is a much curvier secondary route.

The portion of the highway from US 27 in Huntsville to I-75 in Pioneer is named after Congressman Howard Baker Sr.

== Route description ==
=== Scott County ===
SR 63 begins as a primary highway in Scott County in Huntsville at an intersection with US 27/SR 29/SR 297. It begins concurrent with SR 297. It goes east and enters downtown. It then goes through downtown and junctions with SR 456, a short cut to Oneida, before leaving Huntsville. It continues east through rural Scott County and the community of Fairview before crossing into Campbell County.

=== Campbell County ===
They then enter the community of Pioneer and SR 297 separates from SR 63 here. SR 63 then continues east alone to intersect Old Hwy. 63, the original route of SR 63 and a direct route to Caryville. It then has an interchange and becomes concurrent with I-75 at exit 141. It goes south along I-75 before entering Caryville. In Caryville, it passes by downtown and then separates from I-75 at exit 134, intersects with the other end Old Hwy. 63, and becomes concurrent with US 25W/SR 9. US 25W/SR 63 immediately afterwards junction with SR 116 (John McGhee Blvd./Old US 25W) and then enters Cove Lake State Park and passes by Cove Lake and Caryville Dam before leaving Caryville. They then enter Jacksboro and become the major artery of the city, bypassing downtown to the west and running through the heart of the main business district. They then leave Jacksboro and enter LaFollette. US 25W/SR 63 continue through the center of LaFollette and enter downtown. In downtown, US 25W and SR 63 separate with US 25W heading north towards Jellico and Kentucky and SR 63 heads towards Harrogate and Middlesboro. SR 63 then leaves LaFollette and travels up the Powell Valley through the communities of Fincastle, Well Springs, Speedwell, Powell Valley, and Arthur before entering Harrogate, crossing into Claiborne County in between Fincastle and Speedwell.

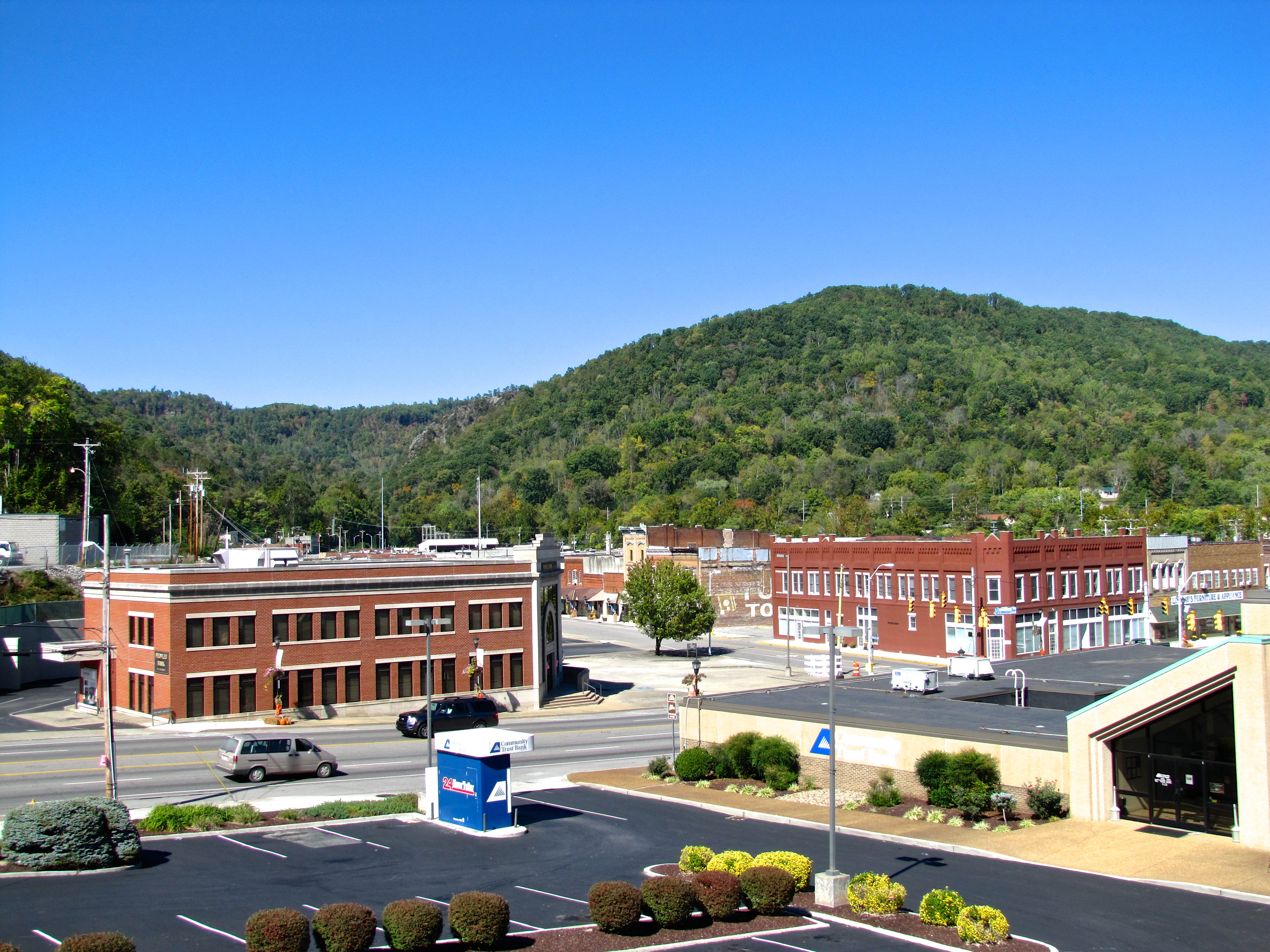
The intersection of Central Avenue (U.S. Route 25W / State Route 63) and Tennessee Avenue in downtown LaFollette, Tennessee.

=== Claiborne County ===
In Harrogate, SR 63 passes by the Lincoln Memorial University (LMU) campus then has an intersection and short concurrency with US 25E/SR 32. It then becomes a very curvy secondary route and continues east through a mix of farmland and mountainous terrain to pass through the communities of Forge Ridge and Hopewell before crossing the Powell River and having a junction with SR 345 and crossing into Hancock County.

=== Hancock County ===
SR 63 runs parallel to the river for several miles before going through Mulberry Gap and then crossing a mountain pass before entering Sneedville and ending as a secondary highway at an intersection with SR 33.

== Major intersections ==
County	Location	mi	km	Destinations	Notes
Scott	Huntsville	0.0	0.0	US 27 / SR 297 west (Scott Highway / SR 29) – Wartburg, Oneida, Historic Rugby, Big South Fork National Recreational Area	Western terminus; western end of SR 297 concurrency; SR 63 begins as a primary highway
Scott	Huntsville			SR 456 north (Annadell Road) – Oneida	Southern terminus of SR 456
Campbell	Pioneer			SR 297 east (Newcomb Pike) – Newcomb, Elk Valley, Jellico	Eastern end of SR 297 concurrency
Campbell	Caryville			I-75 north – Lexington, KY	Western end of I-75 concurrency; SR 63 west follows exit 141
Campbell	Caryville			I-75 south / US 25W south (SR 9) – Knoxville	Eastern end of I-75 concurrency; Western end of US 25W/SR 9 concurrency; SR 63 east follows exit 134
Campbell	Caryville			SR 116 south (John McGhee Boulevard) – Vasper, Rocky Top	Northern terminus of SR 116
Campbell	Caryville			Bridge over Cove Lake	
Campbell	LaFollette			US 25W north (Indiana Avenue / SR 9) to I-75 north – Jellico	Eastern end of US 25W/SR 9 concurrency
Claiborne	Harrogate			US 25E north (Cumberland Gap Parkway / SR 32) – Middlesboro, KY	Western end of US 25E/SR 32 concurrency; SR 63 becomes a secondary highway
Claiborne	Harrogate			US 25E south (Cumberland Gap Parkway / SR 32) – Tazewell	Eastern end of US 25E/SR 32 concurrency
Claiborne				G.W. Brooks Memorial Bridge over the Powell River	
Claiborne				SR 345 south (Cedar Fork Road) – Tazewell	Northern terminus of SR 345
Hancock	Sneedville	101.06	162.64	SR 33 (Main Street) – Tazewell, Kyles Ford	Eastern terminus; SR 63 ends as a secondary highway
1.000 mi = 1.609 km; 1.000 km = 0.621 mi: Concurrency terminus
