= SCX =

SCX may refer to:

- Elan SCX, a model of alpine ski
- L. S. Starrett Company, an American manufacturer
- Oldsmobile Achieva SCX, an automobile
- Salina Cruz Airport, in Oaxaca, Mexico
- Scleraxis, encoded by the SCX gene
- Scott Municipal Airport, in Tennessee, United States
- Siculian, an extinct language of Sicily
- Sun Country Airlines, an American airline
