= State of Scott =

Unrecognized enclave of the Union during the American Civil War

Coordinates: 36.43°N 84.51°W

Free and Independent State of Scott
- Unrecognized territorial enclave of the United States
- 1861–1986
- Flag

- Scott County in 1861
- Capital: Huntsville, Tennessee
- Government
  - Type: Organized unrecognized State
- History
  - Secession from Tennessee: 1861
  - Proposed by Senator Andrew Johnson: June 4, 1861
  - Tennessee secedes from Union: June 8, 1861
  - Symbolic re-integration into the State of Tennessee: 1986
Preceded by	Succeeded by
United States; Tennessee	United States; Tennessee

The State of Scott was the result of a Southern Unionist movement in Scott County, Tennessee, in which the county declared itself a "Free and Independent State" following Tennessee's decision to secede from the United States and align the state with the Confederacy on the eve of the American Civil War in 1861. Like much of East Tennessee, Scott became an enclave community of the Union during the war. Although its edict had never been officially recognized by either the Confederacy or the Union, the county did not officially rescind its act of secession until 1986.

== Background ==
At the time of the secession from the Union, Tennessee's Scott County listed only 61 slaves in residence. It was one of only two counties in the entire state with fewer than 100 slaves. Tennessee was the last state to secede from the Union, in part due to the huge divide in resources and political power between the state's three divisions. East Tennessee, of which Scott County was a part, was less dependent on slavery than Middle and West Tennessee. Therefore, there was little incentive for the residents of the eastern part of the state to go to war to preserve that socio-economic institution. The people of East Tennessee largely favored an intact Union and wanted minimal government interference in their lives. They held a generally unfavorable view of the rest of the state whose wealthy businessmen and plantation owners wielded political and economic power over the entire state.

== History ==
=== Secession ===
In a June 4, 1861, speech delivered on the steps of the Huntsville courthouse, Senator (and future president) Andrew Johnson—a Democrat and slave holder—stated, "...it is not the free men of the north that [secessionists] are fearing most, but the free men of the South..." Four days later, the people of Scott County voted overwhelmingly (541–19) against Tennessee's referendum on secession from the Union, and later that year the county court voted to approve the Scott County General Assembly's unanimous resolution approving of its own secession from Tennessee. The resolution allowed the immediate formation of the "Independent State of Scott," which established an enclave community whose sympathies remained strongly loyal to the Union throughout, and following, the war.

"If the goddamn State of Tennessee can secede from the Union, then Scott County can secede from the State of Tennessee." —Local farmer

=== State response ===
In response to the State of Scott proclamation of independence, Tennessee Governor Isham Harris quickly gathered 1,700 soldiers to march to Huntsville and put down the "rebellion." Facing extreme resistance, however, the troops were forced to retreat before reaching the capital.

=== Battle of Huntsville ===
Because the area was of little strategic value, the mountainous and somewhat isolated State of Scott was not the site of any fighting on a major scale during the Civil War, with the exception of the minor Battle of Huntsville, fought on August 13, 1862. Facing a Confederate force of approximately 2,000 troops and suffering from high levels of desertion and battle attrition, Union commander Colonel William Clift was forced from the town and retreated into the back woods with about 20 remaining men. After the Battle of Huntsville, Clift's reconstituted but ragtag regiment fought more as a guerrilla unit for much of the rest of the year. The area continued to be torn for some time by guerrilla warfare, bushwhacking, and skirmishing, which often took on a brutally violent and vicious nature, often between neighbors. Male residents from the area did, however, become the main source of volunteers for the Union’s 7th Regiment Tennessee Volunteer Infantry.

== Aftermath ==
Ulysses S. Grant received over 90% of the vote in Scott County during both the 1868 United States presidential election and the 1872 United States presidential election. The county has voted Republican in virtually every presidential election since, excepting the 1912 election where it voted for the Progressive Party.

The proclamation of secession was finally repealed by Scott County in 1986. At the same time, the county petitioned the state of Tennessee for readmission, which was ceremonially granted, even though its secession had not been recognized by the state—nor the federal governments of either the Union or the Confederacy.

== Roadside marker ==
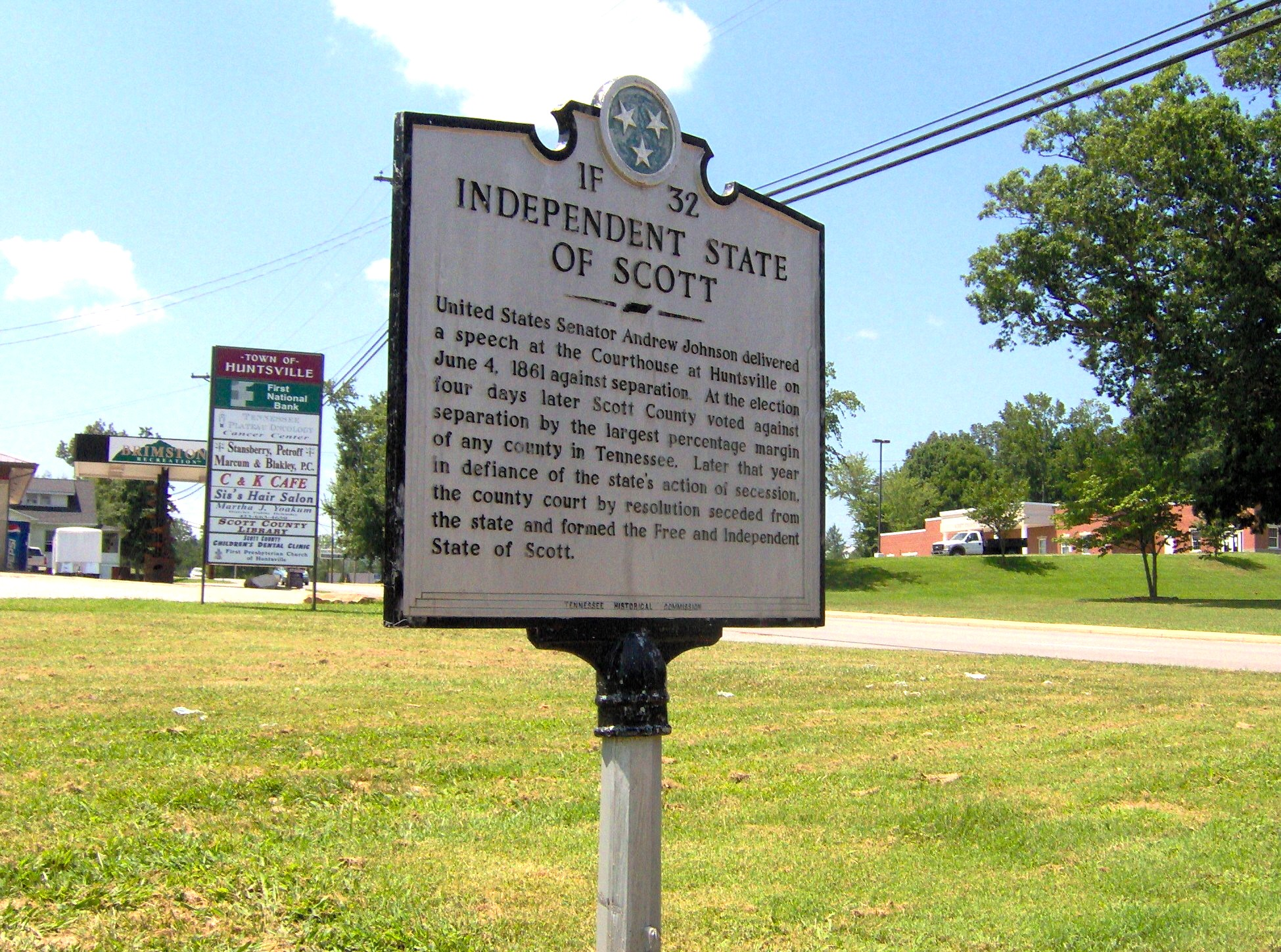

A roadside marker on State Route 63, near the county seat, Huntsville, reads:

United States Senator Andrew Johnson delivered a speech at the Courthouse at Huntsville on June 4, 1861 against separation. At the election four days later Scott County voted against separation by the largest percentage margin of any county in Tennessee. Later that year in defiance of the state's action of secession, the county court by resolution seceded from the state and formed the Free and Independent State of Scott.

== See also ==
- State of Franklin, an eighteenth century unrecognized state in East Tennessee
- Republic of Winston, a similar area in Alabama
- Nickajack, a region in northern Alabama and eastern Tennessee with few slaves and Unionist sympathies
