= Scott Municipal Airport =

- IATA: none; ICAO: KSCX; FAA LID: SCX

Summary
- Airport type: Public
- Owner: Scott County
- Serves: Oneida, Tennessee
- Location: Big South Fork Airpark
- Elevation AMSL: 1,545 ft / 471 m
- Coordinates: 36°27′20″N 084°35′08″W

Map
- Location of airport in Tennessee KSCX (the United States)

Runways
Direction	Length		Surface
Direction	ft	m	Surface
5/23	5,505	1,677	Asphalt

Statistics (2004)
- Aircraft operations: 11,000
- Based aircraft: 23

Scott Municipal Airport (ICAO: KSCX, FAA LID: SCX) is a public-use airport located four nautical miles (7 km) southwest of the central business district of Oneida, a city in Scott County, Tennessee, United States. The airport is owned by Scott County. Big South Fork Airpark, a gated community and residential airpark is located adjacent to the airport.

Though most U.S. airports use the same three-letter location identifier for the FAA and IATA, this airport is assigned SCX by the FAA but has no designation from the IATA, which assigns SCX to Salina Cruz, Oaxaca, Mexico.

== Facilities and aircraft ==
Scott Municipal Airport covers an area of 144 acres (58 ha) at an elevation of 1,544.9 feet (471 m) above mean sea level. It has one asphalt paved runway designated 5/23, which measures 5,505 by 75 feet (1,677 x 23 m).

For the 12-month period ending July 31, 2018, the airport had 6,328 aircraft operations, an average of 17 per day; they are categorized as 93.4% general aviation, 0.7% air taxi and 5.7% military. At that time, there were 41 aircraft based at this airport: 24 single engine, 12 multi-engine, four jets and one helicopter.

== See also ==
- List of airports in Tennessee
