= Republic of Winston =

Anti-secessionist region of Alabama in the Civil War

Coordinates: 34°08′57″N 87°22′29″W

Republic of Winston Informal Winston County, Alabama Formal
- Map of Alabama highlighting Winston County as of 1861
- Historical era: American Civil War

Population
  - 1861: 3,450 (White) 122 (Slave)
- Today part of: Winston, Cullman, and Blount counties in Alabama

The informal Republic of Winston, or Free State of Winston, an area encompassing the present-day Winston, Cullman and Blount counties of Alabama, was one of several places in the Confederate States of America where disaffection during the American Civil War was strong. In Winston County, this opposition became violent and had long-lasting political consequences—deep enough to generate a legend after the war that the county had seceded from Alabama.

== Background ==
Winston County is located in the hilly terrain of North Alabama. The area's shallow soil is highly unsuitable for plantation-style agriculture, and thus the county had never been home to many slaves. The 1860 U.S. census lists only 3,450 white residents in the county and 122 slaves. Winston's residents were mainly poor farmers.

== Refusal of the Ordinance of Secession ==
Winston County's representative at the January 1861 Alabama Secession Convention was Charles Christopher Sheats, a 21-year-old schoolteacher. He refused to sign Alabama's Ordinance of Secession, even after it had been passed by a vote of 61 to 39. Sheats became so vocal in his opposition that he was eventually arrested. Upon his release, he became a leader of a pro-neutrality group. Later, as a vocal Southern Unionist, he spent much of the war in prison.

A meeting was held at Looney's Tavern, where a series of resolutions was passed. These stated that the people of Winston County had no desire to take part in the war and intended to support neither side. One resolution declared that if a state could secede from the Union, then a county could secede from the state. Richard Payne, a pro-Confederate, laughed with delight. "Winston County secedes!" he shouted. "Hoorah for the 'Free State of Winston'!" From Payne's remark was born the legend of the "Republic of Winston." Other areas in the South at the time passed similar resolutions, including Searcy County, Arkansas, and Jones County, Mississippi. The so called "State of Scott" in Scott County, Tennessee actually passed an official act of secession, though it was never officially recognized by either sides of the war.

Many Winston County residents refused induction into the Confederate Army, and some spoke openly of organizing troops to support the Union. The worried state authorities moved to enforce obedience to the cause through conscription and loyalty oaths, which only made matters worse.

== During the war ==
In April 1862, the Union Army invaded northern Alabama. Many of the pro-Union Winston county residents, as well as those from the similarly aligned Nickajack area on the Tennessee border, enlisted in the Union Army's new 1st Alabama Cavalry Regiment, commanded by an officer from New York, George E. Spencer. While the 1st Alabama Cavalry would play an important part in the war, it generally did so outside of Alabama.

Between 8,000 and 10,000 deserters from the Confederate Army were sheltered in Winston County during the war.

== Aftermath ==
After the war, local politics in Winston County were dominated by the Republican Party.

== Legacy ==
Winston's unique history has become the basis of a small tourist industry, which includes an outdoor drama loosely based on the events. A prominent local landmark in the county is the "Free state of Winston barn", a decaying barn with the phrase painted on the sign, located between Haleyville and Double Springs. A passenger boat named the Free State Lady plies the waters of the county's Smith Lake. The "Dual Destiny" statue located in front of Winston County courthouse in Double Springs depicts a young soldier dressed half as a Union troop and half as Confederate soldier.

== See also ==
- Callaway County, Missouri, which allegedly established itself as an independent kingdom at the start of the Civil War.
- Dade County, Georgia, which allegedly seceded from the state of Georgia before the outbreak of the Civil War.
- Fannin County, Georgia, which moved from pro-secession to anti-secession stands during the Civil War.
- Free State of Jones, which attempted secession from Mississippi.
- State of Scott, which seceded from Tennessee.
- Van Zandt County, Texas, which attempted to secede from Texas after the Civil War.
