= Big South Fork Airpark =

- airpark
- Location in Tennessee
- Coordinates: 36°26′57″N 84°35′45″W
- Country: United States
- State: Tennessee
- County: Scott County
- Municipality: Oneida
- Established: 2006

Area
  - Total: 0.703 sq mi (1.821 km^{2})
- Elevation: 1,540 ft (470 m)
- Time zone: UTC-5 (EST)
  - Summer (DST): UTC-4 (EDT)
- ZIP code: 37841
- Website: www.bsfairpark.com

The Big South Fork Airpark is located 50 miles north of Knoxville, Tennessee, and includes a 5,500-foot long asphalt runway with three instrument approaches. The airpark grounds include homesteads with taxiway access, personal hangars, and a maintenance facility.

== Airpark ==
Big South Fork Airpark is served by the adjacent Scott Municipal Airport. It is owned by Bill Armstrong.

=== Wings Over Big South Fork Air Show ===
The airpark participates in the Wings Over Big South Fork air show every September. Attractions include aerial shows and a display of airplanes from eras ranging from World War I to modern fighter jets.
