= Helenwood, Tennessee =

- Census-designated place
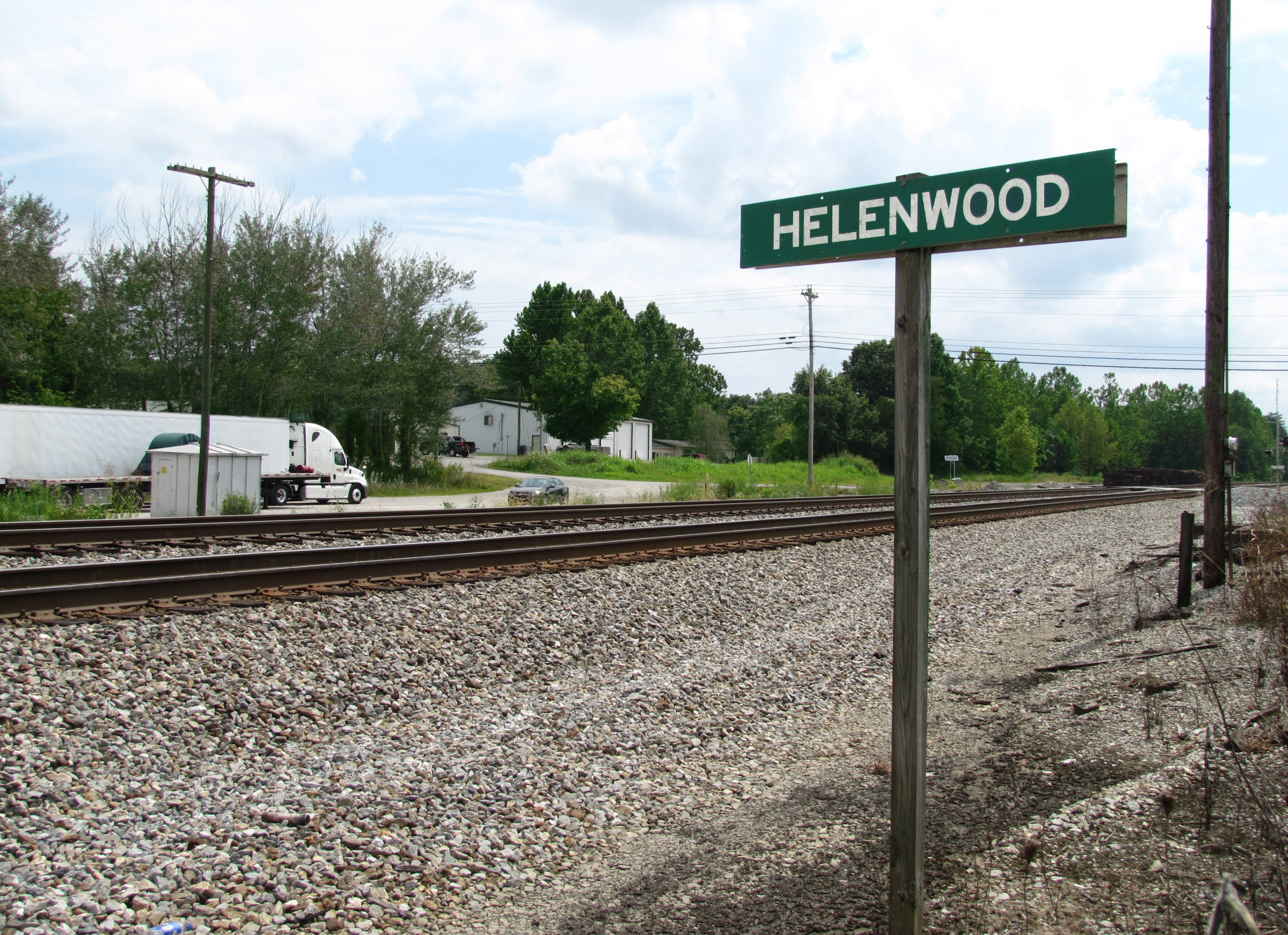

- Location of Helenwood, Tennessee
- Coordinates: 36°25′24″N 84°32′29″W
- Country: United States
- State: Tennessee
- County: Scott

Area
  - Total: 2.01 sq mi (5.20 km^{2})
  - Land: 2.01 sq mi (5.20 km^{2})
  - Water: 0 sq mi (0.00 km^{2})
- Elevation: 1,388 ft (423 m)

Population (2020)
  - Total: 635
  - Density: 316.1/sq mi (122.05/km^{2})
- Time zone: UTC-5 (Eastern (EST))
  - Summer (DST): UTC-4 (EDT)
- ZIP code: 37755
- Area code: 423
- FIPS code: 47-33120
- GNIS feature ID: 1287335

Helenwood is an unincorporated community in Scott County, Tennessee, United States. The population was 846 at the 2000 census, when Helenwood was treated as an incorporated municipality. For the 2010 census, it was a census-designated place (CDP) with a population of 865.

== History ==
Helenwood was platted in 1859 under the name "Homestead." It was settled as a coal-mining community. The origin of its current name is not known.

On April 5, 1935, a dynamite explosion caused extensive damage in Helenwood, destroying fifteen homes and damaging many other homes and businesses. One news account said that Helenwood was "literally wiped off the map." There were no fatalities.

Helenwood was incorporated as a town by referendum in 1997, after the state statute that set minimum criteria for municipal incorporation was amended by the Tennessee General Assembly to remove the requirement that a newly incorporating area must not be within three miles of an existing city and to reduce the minimum population for incorporation from 1,500 residents to 225. The legislation that changed the statute had been introduced by Lieutenant Governor John S. Wilder in order to allow Hickory Withe to become a municipality. Helenwood's incorporation was rescinded by state courts after the amendments were declared unconstitutional.

== Geography ==
Helenwood is located at 36°25′24″N 84°32′29″W (36.423357, -84.541511). It is situated along U.S. Route 27 north of Huntsville, in Tennessee's Cumberland Plateau region.

According to the United States Census Bureau, the town has a total area of 2.8 square miles (7.3 km^{2}), all land.

== Demographics ==
Historical population
Census	Pop.	Note	%±
2000	846		—
2010	865		2.2%
2020	635		−26.6%
U.S. Decennial Census

As the census of 2010, there were 865 people in the Helenwood CDP.

As of the census of 2000, there were 846 people, 341 households, and 247 families residing in the town. The population density was 307.0 inhabitants per square mile (118.5/km^{2}). There were 364 housing units at an average density of 132.1 per square mile (51.0/km^{2}). The racial makeup of the town was 97.87% White, 0.59% Native American, and 1.54% from two or more races.

There were 341 households, out of which 37.5% had children under the age of 18 living with them, 54.8% were married couples living together, 14.7% had a female householder with no husband present, and 27.3% were non-families. 24.9% of all households were made up of individuals, and 10.0% had someone living alone who was 65 years of age or older. The average household size was 2.47 and the average family size was 2.95.

In the town the population was spread out, with 27.1% under the age of 18, 11.0% from 18 to 24, 27.8% from 25 to 44, 21.6% from 45 to 64, and 12.5% who were 65 years of age or older. The median age was 34 years. For every 100 females, there were 88.8 males. For every 100 females age 18 and over, there were 85.3 males.

The median income for a household in the town was $18,148, and the median income for a family was $21,094. Males had a median income of $26,023 versus $20,833 for females. The per capita income for the town was $9,217. About 28.1% of families and 33.1% of the population were below the poverty line, including 49.4% of those under age 18 and 16.5% of those age 65 or over.

== Notable people ==
- Harry Stonecipher, president and chief operating officer of Boeing from 1997 to 2002, was a native of Helenwood and grew up in the community.
