= Pioneer, Tennessee =

- Unincorporated community
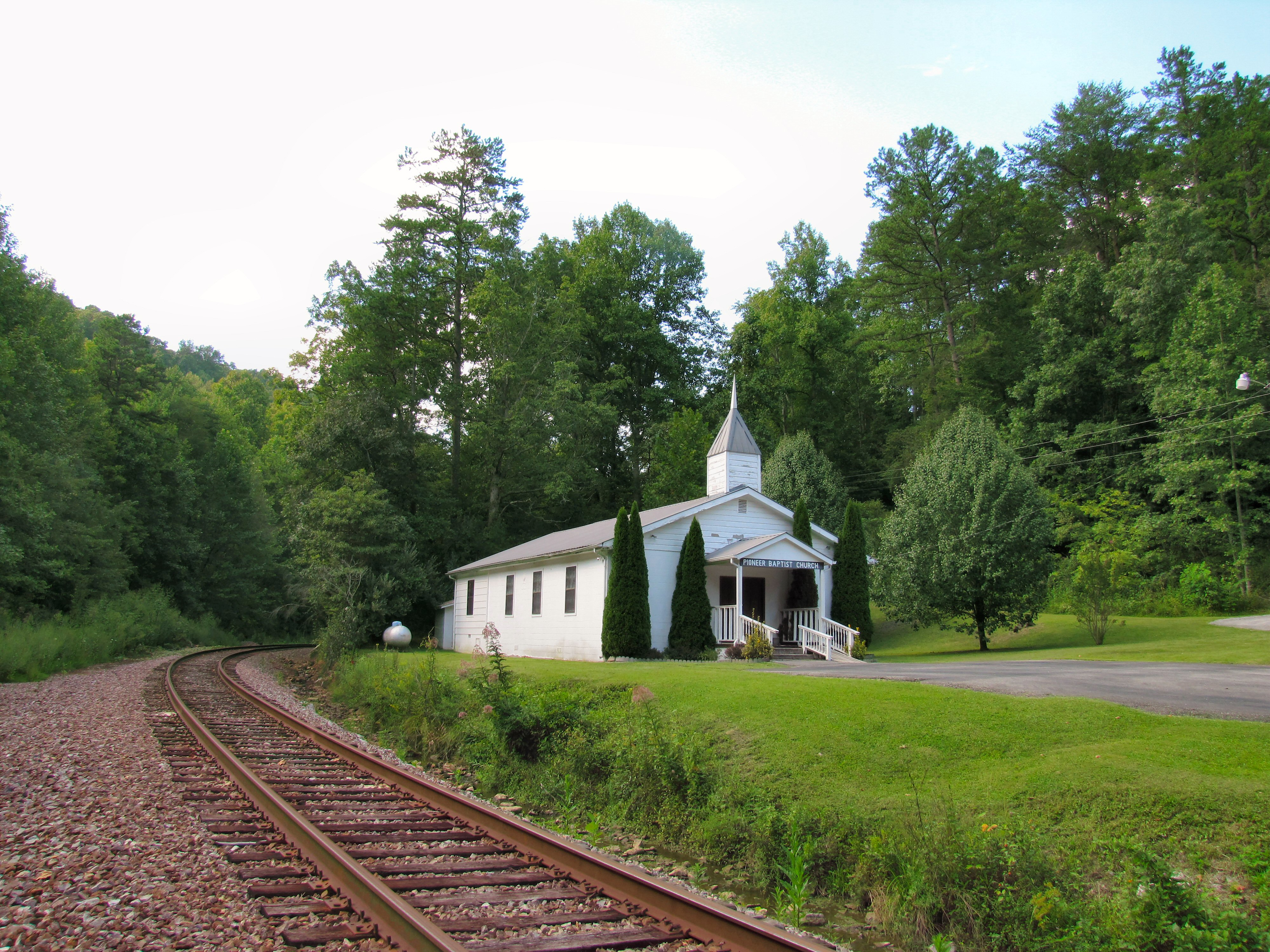
- Pioneer Baptist Church

- Location within Tennessee Location within the United States
- Coordinates: 36°25′03″N 84°18′51″W
- Country: United States
- State: Tennessee
- County: Campbell
- Elevation: 1,549 ft (472 m)
- Time zone: UTC-5 (Eastern (EST))
  - Summer (DST): UTC-4 (EDT)
- ZIP code: 37847
- Area code: 423
- GNIS feature ID: 1297689

Pioneer is an unincorporated community in Campbell County, Tennessee, United States. Its ZIP code is 37847. It is situated in the upper Cove Creek Valley at the intersection of Tennessee State Route 297 and Tennessee State Route 63.
