= New River, Tennessee =

- Unincorporated community
- Location within Tennessee Location within the United States
- Coordinates: 36°22′57″N 84°32′55″W
- Country: United States
- State: Tennessee
- County: Scott
- Elevation: 1,194 ft (364 m)
- Time zone: UTC-5 (Eastern (EST))
  - Summer (DST): UTC-4 (EDT)
- Area code: 423
- GNIS feature ID: 1295630

New River (also Newriver) is an unincorporated community in Scott County, Tennessee, United States.

Josephus S. Cecil (1878–1940), United States Army officer and recipient of the Medal of Honor for actions during the Philippine–American War, was born in New River.
