= Huntsville High School (Tennessee) =

Location
- 220 East Main Street; Huntsville, Tennessee; 36.4125°N 84.4875°W

Information
- School type: Public, high school
- Founded: 1932
- Language: English

Huntsville High School was a public high school located in Huntsville, Tennessee.

== History ==
Huntsville High School was established in 1932.

== Notable alumni ==
- John Duncan Sr., politician
