= Mulberry Gap, Tennessee =

- Unincorporated community
- Mulberry Gap
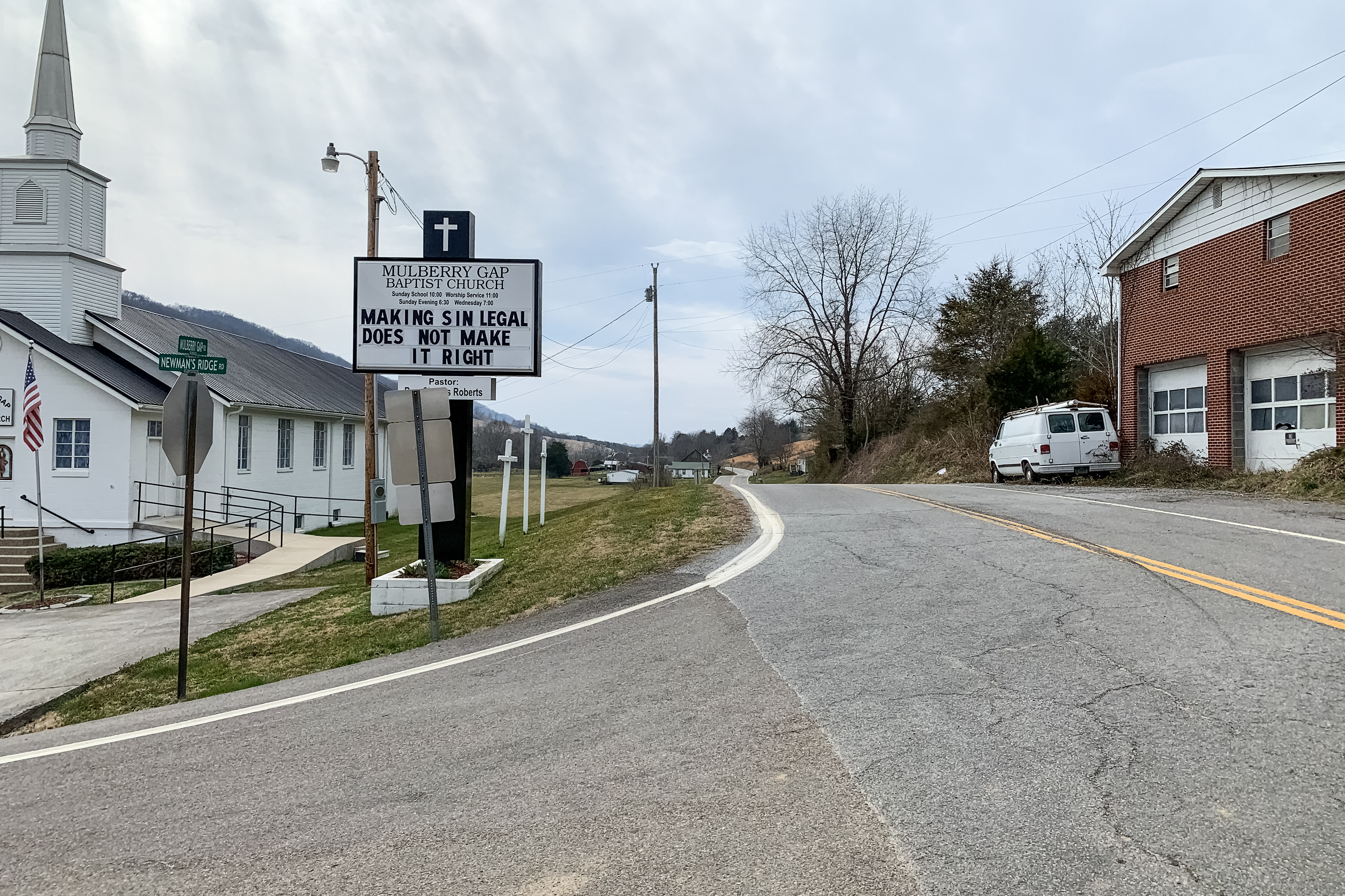
- SR 63 in Mulberry Gap

- Location within Tennessee Location within the United States
- Coordinates: 36°34′38″N 83°15′20″W
- Country: United States
- State: Tennessee
- County: Hancock
- Time zone: UTC-5 (Eastern (EST))
  - Summer (DST): UTC-4 (EDT)
- ZIP code: 37869
- Area code: 423
- GNIS feature ID: 1295061

Mulberry Gap is an unincorporated community in northwestern Hancock County, Tennessee, along SR 63. This community is unincorporated.
