= Montgomery, Tennessee =

Unincorporated community in Tennessee, US

Coordinates: 36.32555°N 84.370666°W

Montgomery is an unincorporated community in Scott County, Tennessee, United States.
