= Scleraxis =

Mammalian protein found in Homo sapiens

SCX

Identifiers
- Aliases: SCX, SCXA, SCXB, bHLHa48, LOC642658, scleraxis bHLH transcription factor
- External IDs: OMIM: 609067; MGI: 102934; GeneCards: SCX

Gene location (Human)
| Chr. | Chromosome 8 (human) |
| Band | 8q24.3 | Start | 144,266,453 bp |
| Band | 8q24.3 | End | 144,268,481 bp |

Gene location (Mouse)
| Chr. | Chromosome 15 (mouse) |
| Band | 15 D3|15 35.92 cM | Start | 76,341,652 bp |
| Band | 15 D3|15 35.92 cM | End | 76,343,658 bp |
RNA expression pattern
| Bgee | Human / Mouse (ortholog); Top expressed in: thymus; quadriceps femoris muscle; right lobe of thyroid gland; left lobe of thyroid gland; Achilles tendon; right hemisphere of cerebellum; anterior pituitary; muscle of thigh; gonad; ascending aorta / Top expressed in: digit; toe; metatarsal bones; fifth metatarsal bone; interventricular septum; plantaris muscle; cardiac muscle tissue of left ventricle; fourth metatarsal bone; extensor digitorum longus muscle; finger; More reference expression data |
| BioGPS | n/a |
Gene ontology
| Molecular function | RNA polymerase II cis-regulatory region sequence-specific DNA binding; DNA binding; sequence-specific DNA binding; protein dimerization activity; bHLH transcription factor binding; E-box binding; DNA-binding transcription activator activity, RNA polymerase II-specific; protein heterodimerization activity; DNA-binding transcription factor activity, RNA polymerase II-specific |
| Cellular component | transcription regulator complex; nucleus |
| Biological process | cellular response to transforming growth factor beta stimulus; positive regulation of collagen biosynthetic process; cell differentiation; regulation of transcription, DNA-templated; chondrocyte differentiation; regulation of cartilage development; positive regulation of gastrulation; collagen fibril organization; tendon development; tendon cell differentiation; mesoderm formation; cellular response to BMP stimulus; negative regulation of apoptotic process; Sertoli cell differentiation; endochondral ossification; transcription by RNA polymerase II; BMP signaling pathway; transcription, DNA-templated; sclerotome development; embryonic skeletal system development; positive regulation of transcription, DNA-templated; multicellular organism development; deltoid tuberosity development; cellular response to mechanical stimulus; positive regulation of gene expression; heart valve formation; positive regulation of cartilage development; heart valve morphogenesis; tissue homeostasis; positive regulation of cell population proliferation; tendon formation; skeletal muscle cell differentiation; negative regulation of transcription, DNA-templated; face morphogenesis; positive regulation of transcription by RNA polymerase II |
Sources:Amigo / QuickGO
Orthologs
| Databases | NCBI: entry; OMA: entry |
| Species | Human | Mouse |
| Entrez | 642658 | 20289 |
| Ensembl | ENSG00000260428 | ENSMUSG00000034161 |
| UniProt | Q7RTU7 | Q64124 |
| RefSeq (mRNA) | NM_001008271; NM_001080514 | NM_198885 |
| RefSeq (protein) | NP_001073983 | NP_942588 |
| Location (UCSC) | Chr 8: 144.27 – 144.27 Mb | Chr 15: 76.34 – 76.34 Mb |
| PubMed search |
- Wikidata
| View/Edit Human | View/Edit Mouse |

scleraxis homolog A (mouse)

Identifiers
- Symbol: SCXA
- NCBI gene: 333927
- HGNC: 24312
- OMIM: 609067
- UniProt: Q7RTU7

Other data
- Locus: Chr. 8 q24.3
Search for
- Structures: Swiss-model
- Domains: InterPro

scleraxis homolog B (mouse)

Identifiers
- Symbol: SCXB
- NCBI gene: 642658
- HGNC: 32322
- RefSeq: XM_926116

Other data
- Locus: Chr. 8 q24.3

The scleraxis protein is a member of the basic helix-loop-helix (bHLH) superfamily of transcription factors. In humans, scleraxis is encoded by the SCX gene.

== Function ==
It is thought that early scleraxis-expressing progenitor cells lead to the eventual formation of tendon tissue and other muscle attachments. Scleraxis is involved in mesoderm formation and is expressed in the syndetome (a collection of embryonic tissue that develops into tendon and blood vessels) of developing somites (primitive segments or compartments of embryos).

== Inducing scleraxis expression ==
The syndetome location within the somite is determined by FGF secreted from the center of the myotome (a collection of embryonic tissue that develops into skeletal muscle)- the FGF then induces the adjacent anterior and posterior sclerotome (a collection of embryonic tissue that develops into the axial skeleton) to adopt a tendon cell fate. This ultimately places future scleraxis-expressing cells between the two tissue types they will ultimately join.

Scleraxis expression will be seen throughout the entire sclerotome (rather than just the sclerotome directly anterior and posterior to the myotome) with an overexpression of FGF8, demonstrating that all sclerotome cells are capable of expressing scleraxis in response to FGF signaling. While the FGF interaction has been shown to be necessary for scleraxis expression, it is still unclear as to whether the FGF signaling pathway directly induces the syndetome to secrete scleraxis, or indirectly through a secondary signaling pathway. Most likely, the syndetomal cells, through careful reading of the FGF concentration (coming from the myotome), can precisely determine their location and begin expressing scleraxis. Much of embryonic development follows this model of inducing specific cell fates through the reading of surrounding signaling molecule concentration gradients.

== Background ==
bHLH transcription factors have been shown to have a wide array of functions in developmental processes. More precisely, they have critical roles in the control of cellular differentiation, proliferation and regulation of oncogenesis. To date, 242 eukaryotic proteins belonging to the HLH superfamily have been reported. They have varied expression patterns in all eukaryotes from yeast to humans.

Structurally, bHLH proteins are characterised by a “highly conserved domain containing a stretch of basic amino acids adjacent to two amphipathic α-helices separated by a loop”.

These helices have important functional properties, forming part of the DNA binding and transcription activating domains. With respect to scleraxis, the bHLH region spans amino acid residues 78 to 131. A proline rich region is also predicted to lie between residues 161–170. A stretch of basic residues, which aids in DNA binding, is found closer to the N terminal end of scleraxis.

HLH proteins that lack this basic domain have been shown to negatively regulate the activities of bHLH proteins and are called inhibitors of differentiation (Id). Basic HLH proteins function normally as dimers and bind to a specific hexanucleotide DNA sequence (CAANTG) known as an E-box thus switching on the expression of various genes involved in cellular development and survival.
