= Elk Valley, Tennessee =

- Unincorporated community
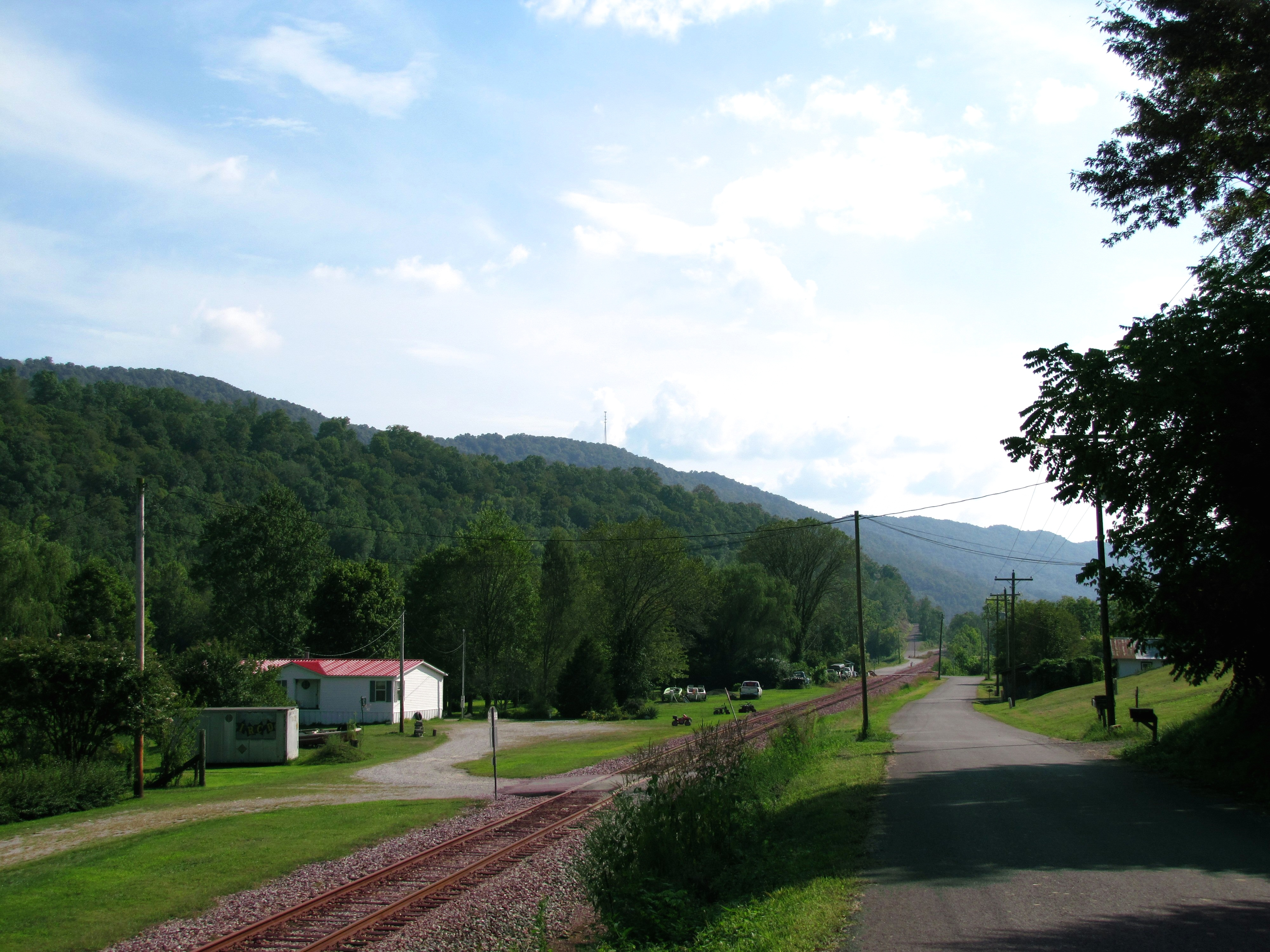

- Location within Tennessee Location within the United States
- Coordinates: 36°29′01″N 84°14′45″W
- Country: United States
- State: Tennessee
- County: Campbell
- Elevation: 1,115 ft (340 m)
- Time zone: UTC-5 (Eastern (EST))
  - Summer (DST): UTC-4 (EDT)
- Area code: 423
- GNIS feature ID: 1283645

Elk Valley is an unincorporated community in Campbell County, Tennessee, United States. It is situated at the northern end of a broad valley of the same name in the Cumberland Mountains, southwest of Jellico. Tennessee State Route 297 (Newcomb Pike) passes through the community.
