= Josephus S. Cecil =

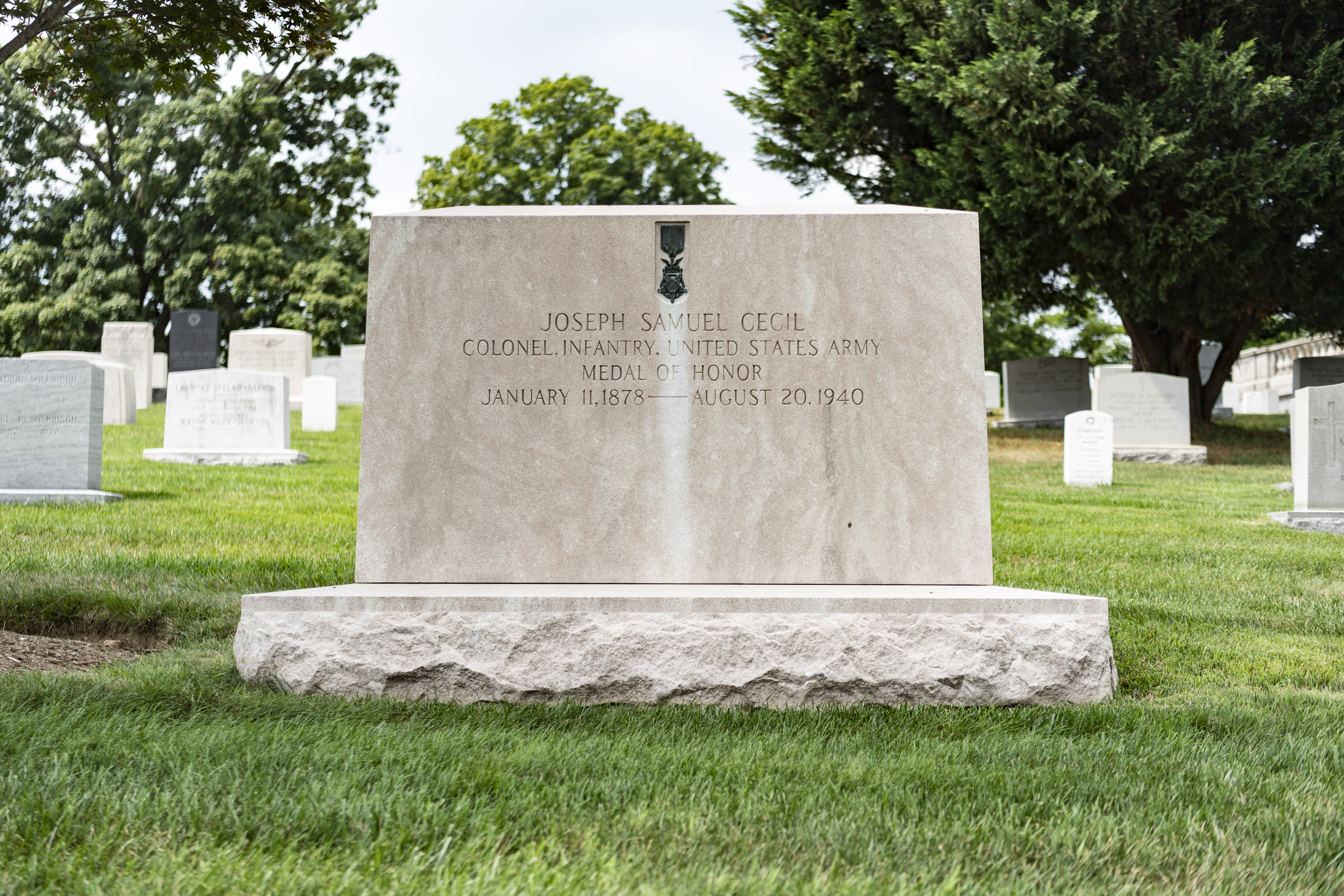
- Grave at Arlington National Cemetery
- Born: January 11, 1878; New River, Tennessee, U.S.
- Died: August 20, 1940 (aged 62)
- Burial place: Arlington National Cemetery
- Military career
- Allegiance: United States of America
- Branch: United States Army
- Service years: 1898–1922
- Rank: Colonel
- Unit: 19th Infantry Regiment
- Conflicts: Spanish–American War; Philippine–American War
- Awards: Medal of Honor

Josephus Samuel Cecil (January 11, 1878 to August 20, 1940) was a United States Army officer who received the Medal of Honor for his actions during the Philippine–American War.

Cecil joined the Army in July 1898, and retired in July 1922.

== Medal of Honor citation ==
Rank and Organization: First Lieutenant, 19th U.S. Infantry. Place and Date: At Bud-Dajo, Jolo, Philippine Islands, March 7, 1906. Entered Service At: New River, Tenn. Birth: New River, Tenn. Date of Issue: Unknown.

Citation:

While at the head of the column about to assault the first cotta under a superior fire at short range personally carried to a sheltered position a wounded man and the body of one who was killed beside him.

== See also ==
- List of Medal of Honor recipients
- List of Philippine–American War Medal of Honor recipients
