= Winona, Scott County, Tennessee =

Winona, Tennessee
- Unincorporated community
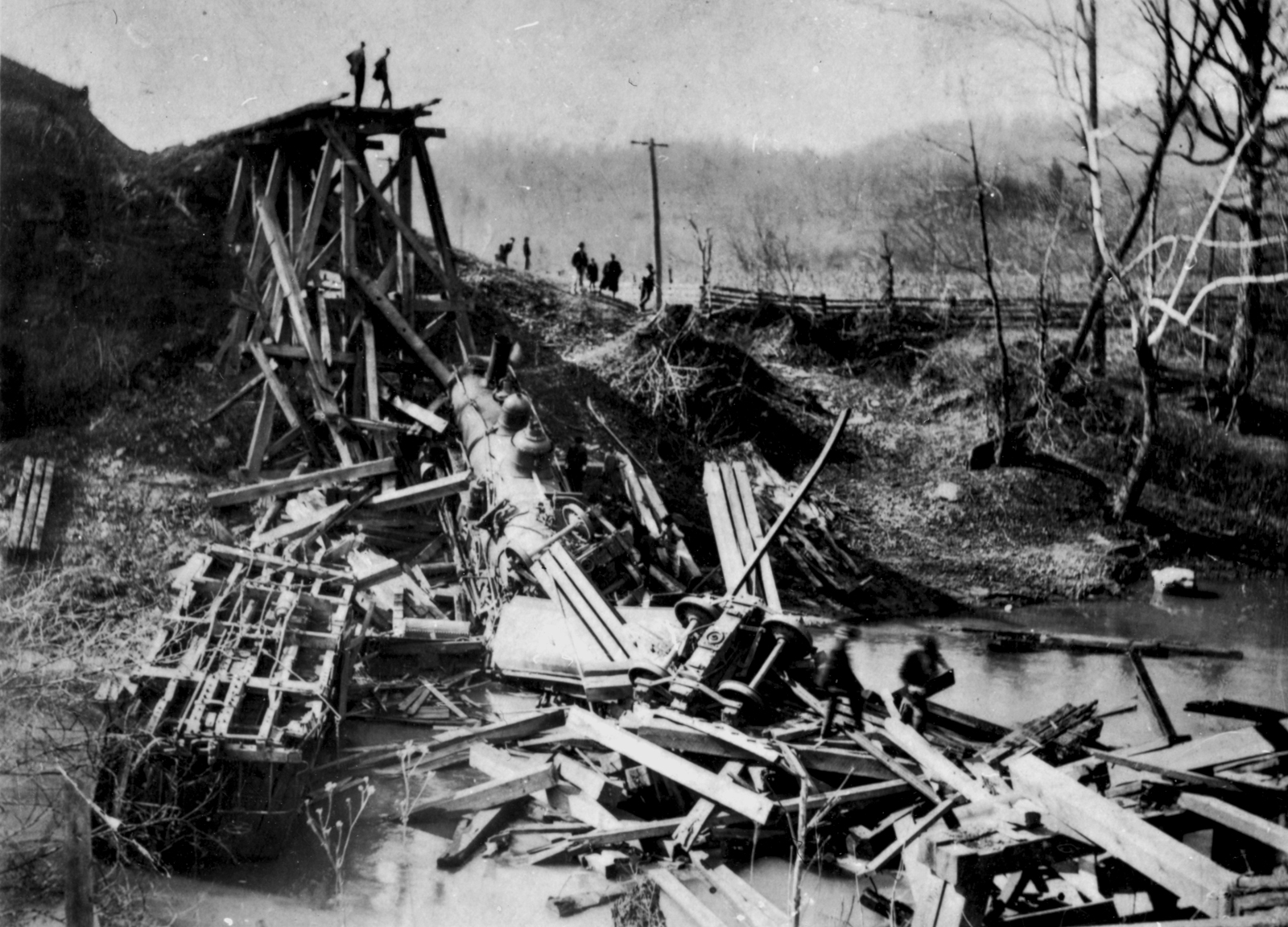
- Wreckage of the Buffalo Creek Trestle at Winona in 1915

- Location within Tennessee Location within the United States
- Coordinates: 36°22′36″N 84°27′01″W
- Country: United States
- State: Tennessee
- County: Scott
- Elevation: 1,188 ft (362 m)
- Time zone: UTC-5 (Eastern (EST))
  - Summer (DST): UTC-4 (EDT)
- Area code: 423
- GNIS feature ID: 1274885

Winona is an unincorporated community in Scott County, Tennessee, United States, located near the mouth of Buffalo Creek, a tributary of the New River.

== History ==
On March 28, 1915, Winona was the site of a train wreck when the 50-foot (15 m) high Buffalo Creek Trestle failed while a train was crossing. The incident, which destroyed both the railroad bridge and the train, killed one person and injured four others.
