= Nickajack =

Region in East Tennessee and northern Alabama

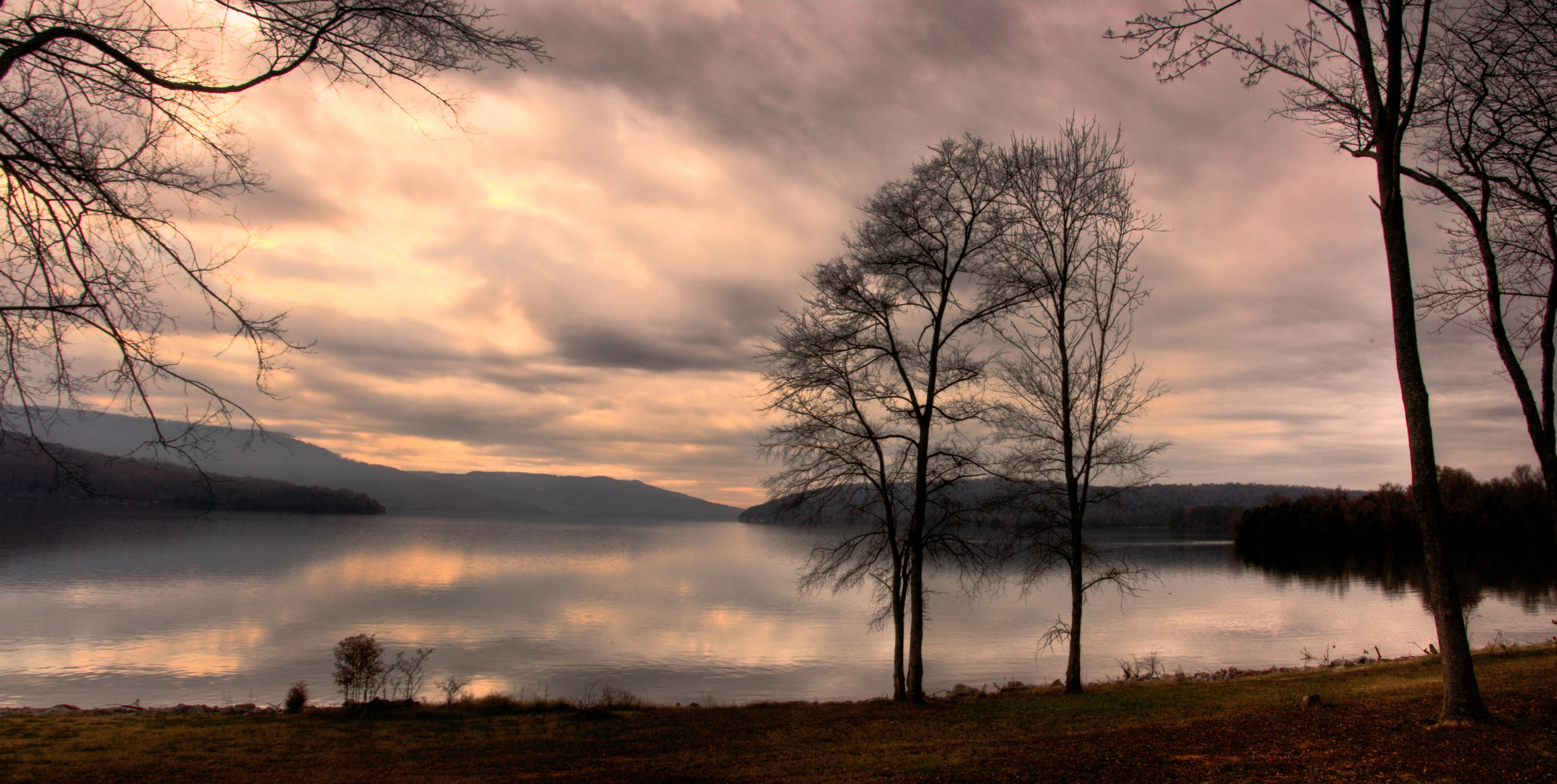
- Nickajack Lake

The area known as "Nickajack" generally refers to the rugged Appalachian foothills in East Tennessee and northeastern Alabama. "Nickajack" is a corruption of the Cherokee word ᎠᏂ ᎫᏌᏘ Ᏹ (Ani-Kusati-yi), which translates to Coosa Town. But it more likely references Koasati Town.

== History ==
In the late 18th century during the colonial war with the Chickamauga, the area was inhabited by Chickamauga Cherokee and Muscogee-Creek warriors residing in the "Five Lower Towns" on the Tennessee River (near present-day Chattanooga). The warriors were mostly Cherokee men, led by Dragging Canoe. Small groups of Shawnee and Creek lived and fought with them, in addition to occasional bands of Muskogee, who also served as allies.

Renegade whites, white traders; Spanish, French, and British agents; and refugee enslaved African Americans also inhabited the area. The notorious outlaw Harpe Brothers are also believed to have resided there for many years.

After those wars, the settlement of Nickajack soon eclipsed the neighboring town of Running Water (Dragging Canoe's seat of operations) as the dominant town in the immediate area. It was strategically positioned near where the "Federal Road", running from Athens to Nashville, crossed over the Tennessee River.

Turtle-at-Home (a brother of Dragging Canoe) was a prominent resident because he owned the ferry at that crossing and had other commercial interests. In addition, Turtle-at-Home was on the council of the Lower Towns, and served as speaker of the Cherokee National Council.

Nickajack Cave, formerly called Tecallassee, near the site of the former town, may have been used as a hideout and cache by the Chickamauga Cherokee.

During the Civil War, its deposits of bat guano were mined by Confederate forces. The cave became one of the leading sources of saltpeter for the Confederate Powderworks at Augusta, Georgia. The road used to transport the material was known as the "Nickajack Trail".

== Civil War era ==
The Nickajack region was a loosely defined region of North Alabama and East Tennessee where public sentiment adhered more strongly to the Union. In the period leading up to the American Civil War, there had been increasing talk of secession by politicians representing the interests of wealthy planters who had large cotton plantations in the Black Belt. This area stretched across central and southern Georgia, Alabama and Mississippi.

Citizens in the more mountainous regions of North Alabama and East Tennessee, where slave ownership was less common, often favored the Union. Many believed, as some said at the time, that rebellion would become "a war for the rich, fought by the poor." People discussed that if Tennessee and Alabama attempted to secede from the Union, the adjacent territories of East Tennessee and North Alabama should secede from their respective states. They should form a new state to be called Nickajack and stay with the Union, joined at the southeast corner of Kentucky. Nothing came of the idea, although Winston County, Alabama discussed secession. The area's reputation as the Free State of Winston persists; Harper Lee mentioned it in her bestselling novel To Kill a Mockingbird.

On January 7, 1861, Alabama Governor Andrew B. Moore called delegates from Alabama to Montgomery for a convention to debate the Articles of Secession. Delegates from South Alabama wanted the convention delegates to determine the vote, while northern delegates wanted the issue put to a popular vote. Because the apportionment of delegates to the convention was based on total population (including slaves), the Southern delegates effectively voted "on behalf" of enslaved African-Americans, who made up a large proportion of the population in the region. The results of the poll determined that the balance of power would shift to the North, where the population was mostly white.

Ultimately, the Alabama Ordinance of Secession was passed by a vote of 61 to 39, split along geographic lines. In addition to Nickajack, Winston County, Alabama, threatened to form its own Free State of Winston. These threats of internal separation never materialized, but men in the region fiercely resisted conscription into the Confederate Army. Many joined the Union Army.
