= Newcomb, Tennessee =

Unincorporated community in Tennessee, US

Coordinates: 36°33′13″N 84°09′58″W

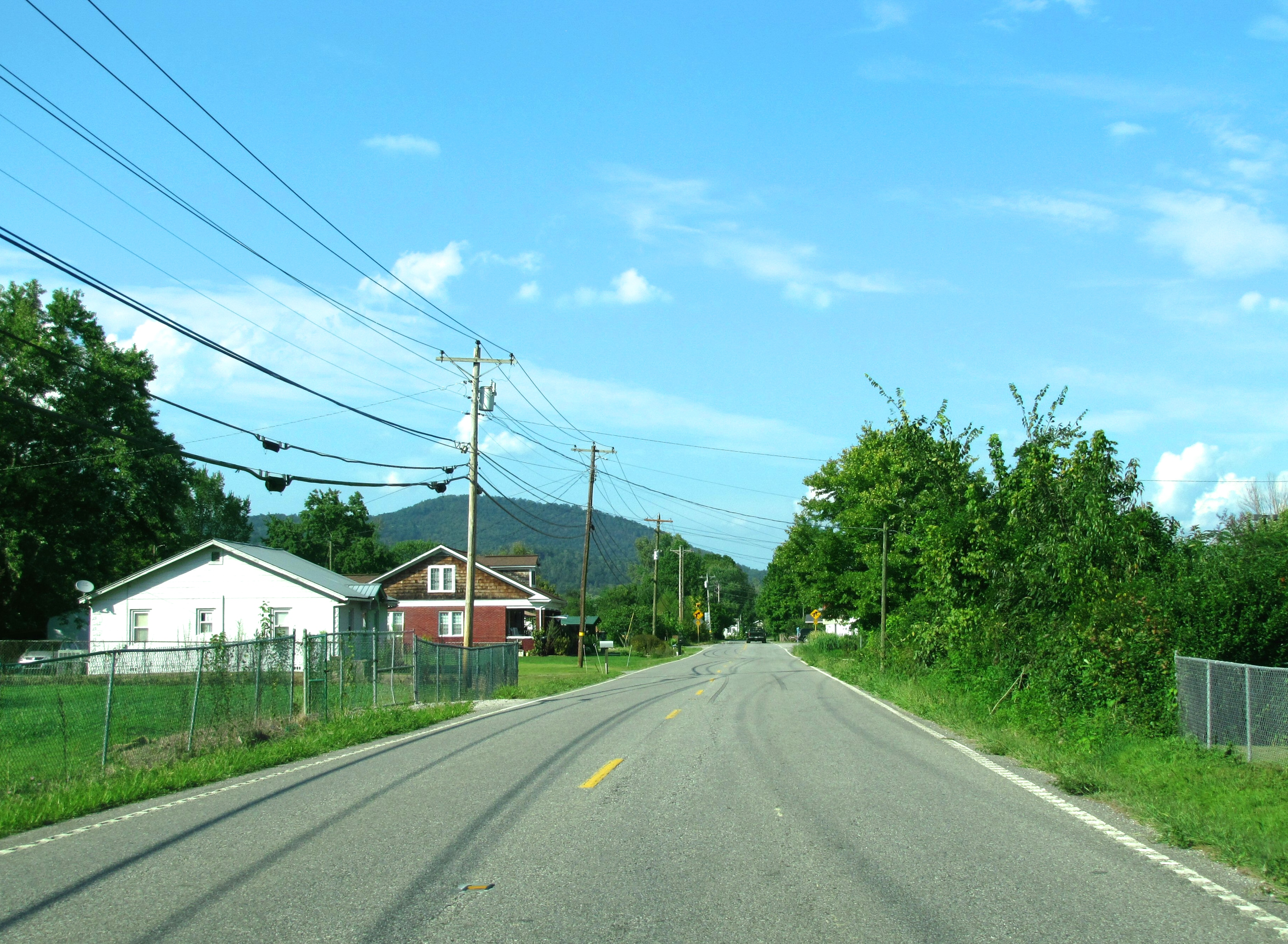
Tennessee State Route 297 in Newcomb

Newcomb is an unincorporated community in Campbell County, Tennessee, United States. It is situated in the Elk Fork Creek Valley in the Cumberland Mountains, southwest of Jellico. Tennessee State Route 297 passes through the community. The ZIP Code for Newcomb is 37819.

== History ==
Newcomb formed in the 19th century as the location of a railroad station on the Knoxville and Ohio Railroad (now part of the Southern Railway). A post office was established in Newcomb in 1883.
