= Winfield, Tennessee =

- Town
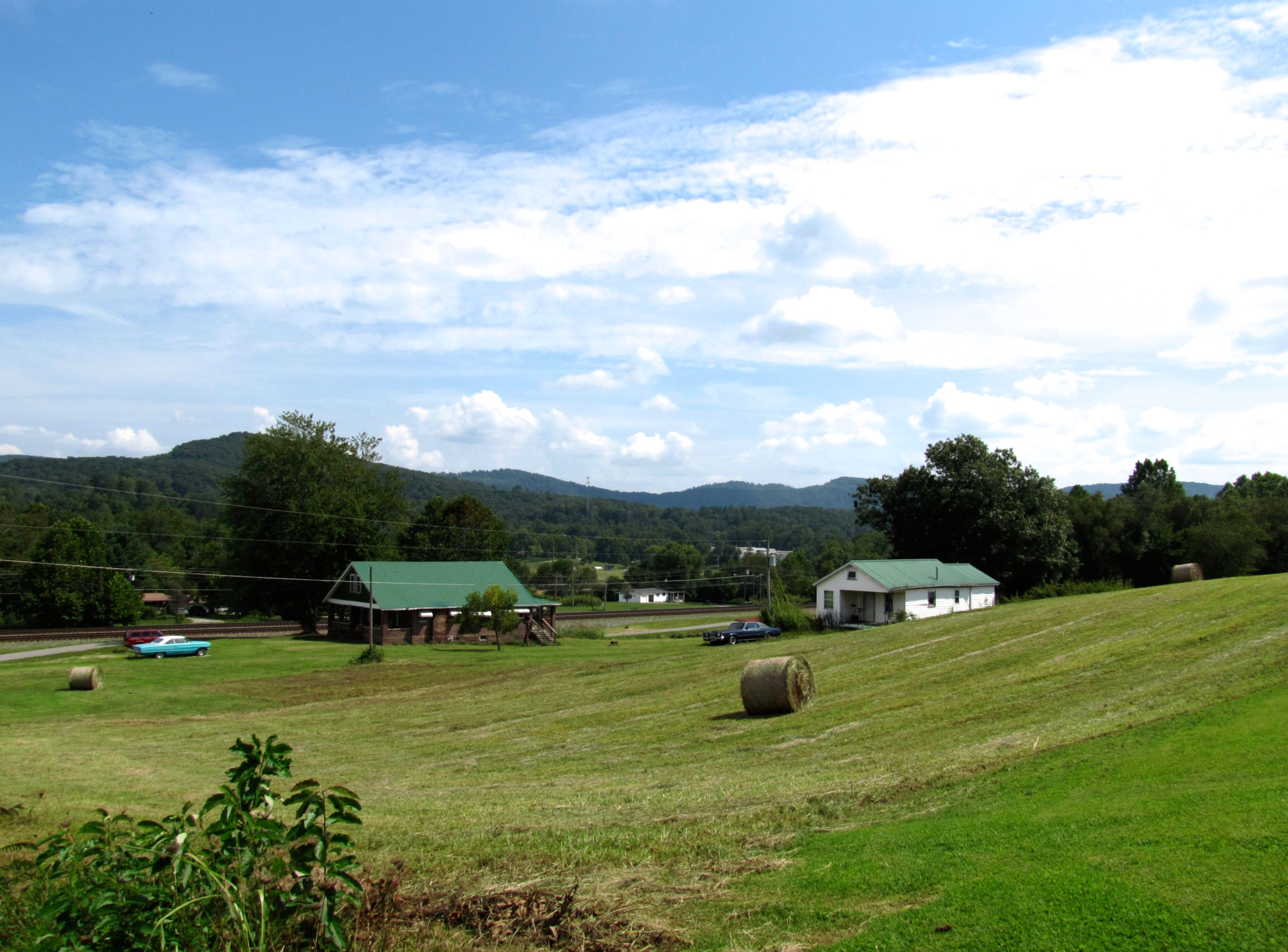

- Location of Winfield in Scott County, Tennessee.
- Coordinates: 36°33′43″N 84°27′2″W
- Country: United States
- State: Tennessee
- County: Scott
- Incorporated: 1983

Area
  - Total: 6.81 sq mi (17.63 km^{2})
  - Land: 6.80 sq mi (17.60 km^{2})
  - Water: 0.012 sq mi (0.03 km^{2})
- Elevation: 1,326 ft (404 m)

Population (2020)
  - Total: 947
  - Density: 139.4/sq mi (53.81/km^{2})
- Time zone: UTC-5 (Eastern (EST))
  - Summer (DST): UTC-4 (EDT)
- ZIP code: 37892
- Area code: 423
- FIPS code: 47-81280
- GNIS feature ID: 1304634

Winfield is a town in Scott County, Tennessee, United States. Originally named Chitwood in the late 18th century for Revolutionary War hero Captain James Chitwood after his family settled the area extensively, the name was changed following the Civil War due to the family's mixed allegiances. The name Winfield was picked in honor of US army general Winfield Scott. The population was 947 at the 2020 census and 967 at the 2010 census.

== Geography ==
Winfield is located at 36°33′43″N 84°27′2″W (36.561889, -84.450425).

According to the United States Census Bureau, the town has a total area of 6.4 square miles (17 km^{2}), of which 6.4 square miles (17 km^{2}) is land and 0.04 square miles (0.10 km^{2}) (0.31%) is water.

The highest point in Winfield is Chitwood Mountain at 2,139 feet.

== Demographics ==
Historical population
Census	Pop.	Note	%±
1990	564		—
2000	911		61.5%
2010	967		6.1%
2020	947		−2.1%

=== 2020 census ===
Winfield racial composition
Race	Number	Percentage
White (non-Hispanic)	912	96.3%
Native American	1	0.11%
Asian	6	0.63%
Other/Mixed	24	2.53%
Hispanic or Latino	4	0.42%

As of the 2020 United States census, there were 947 people, 416 households, and 293 families residing in the town.

=== 2000 census ===
As of the census of 2000, there were 911 people, 356 households, and 259 families residing in the town. The population density was 143.2 inhabitants per square mile (55.3/km^{2}). There were 380 housing units at an average density of 59.7 per square mile (23.1/km^{2}). The racial makeup of the town was 98.13% White, 0.99% Native American, 0.11% Asian, and 0.77% from two or more races. Hispanic or Latino of any race were 0.33% of the population.

There were 356 households, out of which 34.6% had children under the age of 18 living with them, 55.1% were married couples living together, 13.8% had a female householder with no husband present, and 27.2% were non-families. 22.8% of all households were made up of individuals, and 7.6% had someone living alone who was 65 years of age or older. The average household size was 2.56 and the average family size was 2.97.

In the town, the population was spread out, with 27.3% under the age of 18, 10.4% from 18 to 24, 29.4% from 25 to 44, 24.3% from 45 to 64, and 8.6% who were 65 years of age or older. The median age was 32 years. For every 100 females, there were 93.8 males. For every 100 females age 18 and over, there were 94.7 males.

The median income for a household in the town was $25,278, and the median income for a family was $28,077. Males had a median income of $25,260 versus $20,417 for females. The per capita income for the town was $14,059. About 17.7% of families and 19.8% of the population were below the poverty line, including 20.6% of those under age 18 and 27.0% of those age 65 or over.

== Media ==
- The Independent Herald
- Hive 105, WBNT-FM
