= Huntsville, Tennessee =

- Town
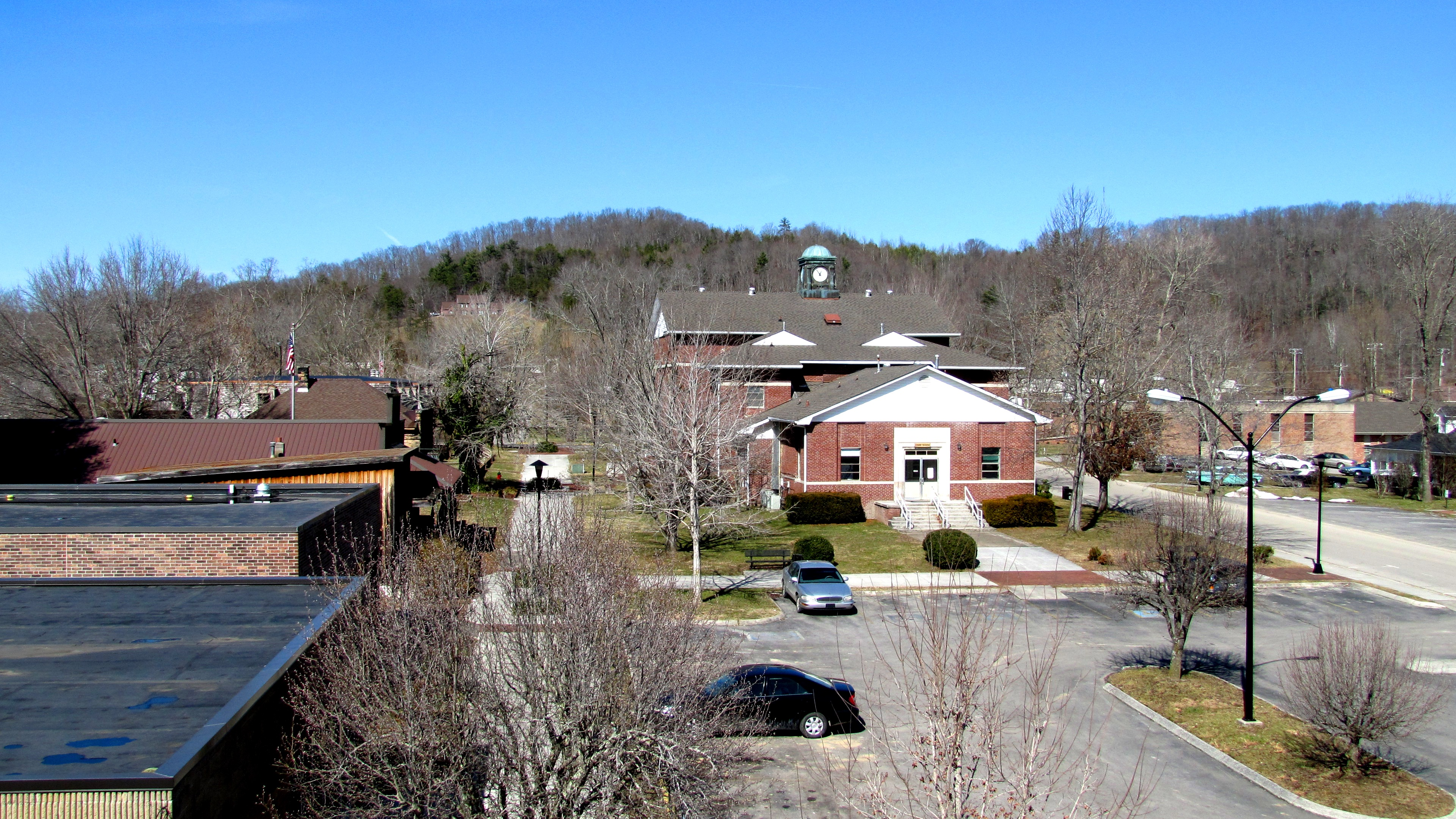
- The courthouse square in Huntsville

- Location of Huntsville in Scott County, Tennessee.
- Coordinates: 36°24′39″N 84°29′42″W
- Country: United States
- State: Tennessee
- County: Scott
- Founded: 1850
- Incorporated: 1965

Area
  - Total: 8.30 sq mi (21.49 km^{2})
  - Land: 8.30 sq mi (21.49 km^{2})
  - Water: 0 sq mi (0.00 km^{2})
- Elevation: 1,319 ft (402 m)

Population (2020)
  - Total: 1,270
  - Density: 153.0/sq mi (59.09/km^{2})
- Time zone: UTC-5 (Eastern (EST))
  - Summer (DST): UTC-4 (EDT)
- ZIP code: 37756
- Area code: 423
- FIPS code: 47-36640
- GNIS feature ID: 1288766
- Website: Town website

Huntsville is a town in Scott County, Tennessee, United States. The population was 1,270 at the 2020 census and 1,248 at the 2010 census. It is the county seat of Scott County.

== History ==
Huntsville was named after a long hunter known only by the surname "Hunt." This long hunter camped under a rock shelter in the mid-18th century and later moved his family to the area. When Scott County was formed in 1849, Huntsville was chosen as the county seat due to the site's central location within the new county as well as an excellent spring that flowed across the property.

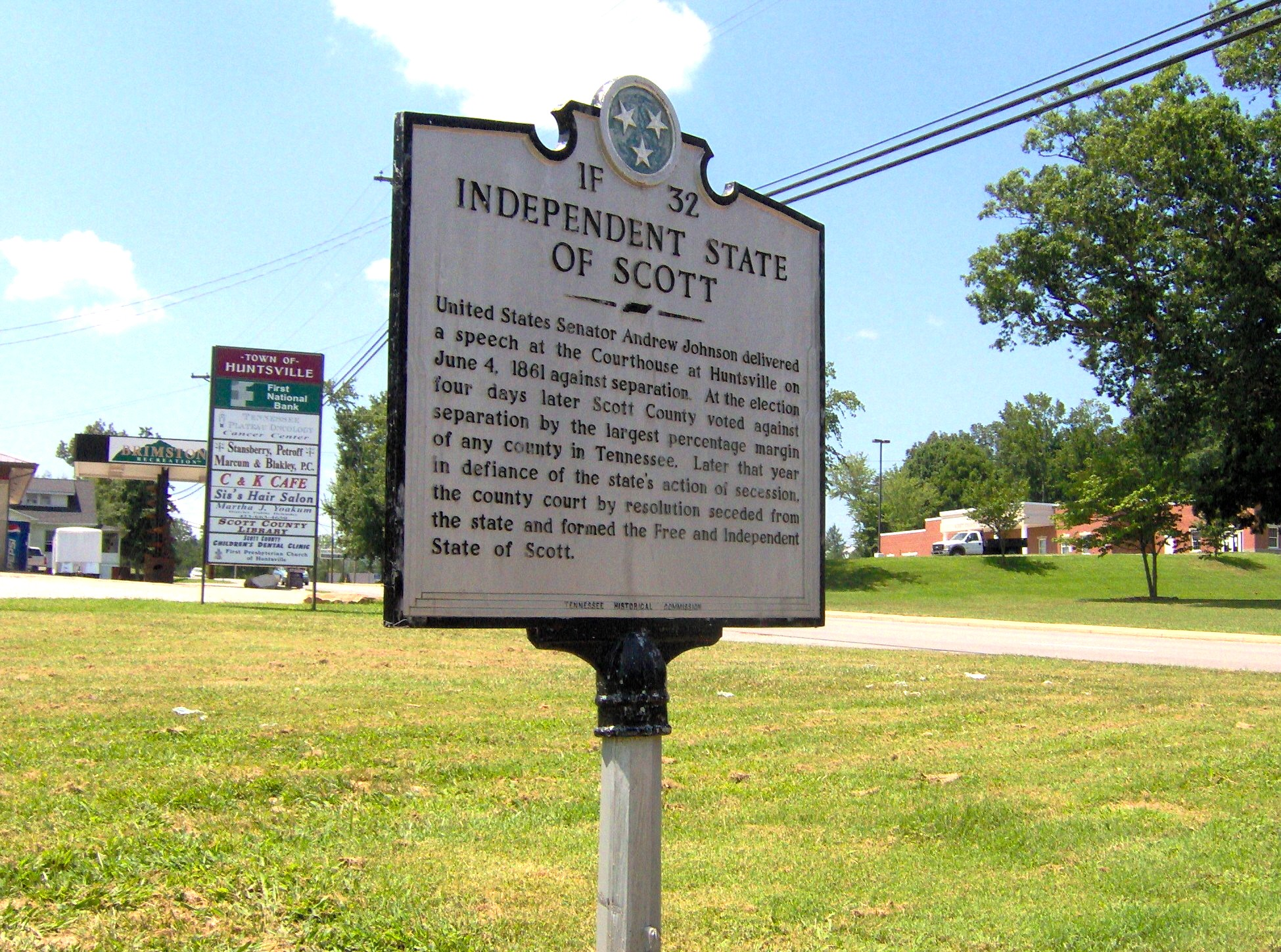
THC marker along TN-63 recalling the Independent State of Scott

During the U.S. Civil War, Scott County was staunchly pro-Union. In Tennessee's June 1861 referendum on secession, the county voted 541–19 against secession, the highest percentage of any county in Tennessee. In spite of fierce opposition from Scott and other East Tennessee counties, the ordinance passed and Tennessee seceded from the Union. Later that year, Scott County voted unanimously to secede from Tennessee and formed the Independent State of Scott.

In 1906, a new courthouse square was built in Huntsville using a beige-colored native sandstone for the buildings' outer walls. Although the courthouse burned in 1946, two of these sandstone buildings remain— the First National Bank building and the Old Scott County Jail. Both have been placed on the National Register of Historic Places.

The Baker family, which arrived in the Huntsville area shortly after the Civil War, has been active in state and national politics for several decades. James F. Baker (1864–1934) was a successful attorney and newspaper publisher. Baker's son, Howard H. Baker, Sr. (1902–1964), was the Republican candidate for governor of Tennessee in 1938 and later served in the U.S. House of Representatives. Howard H. Baker, Jr. (1925-2014), son of Howard Sr., was elected to the U.S. Senate in 1966 and gained national attention as Vice Chairman of the Senate Watergate Committee in 1973. Baker later served as Senate Majority Leader (1981–1985) and White House Chief of Staff (1987–1988).

== Geography ==
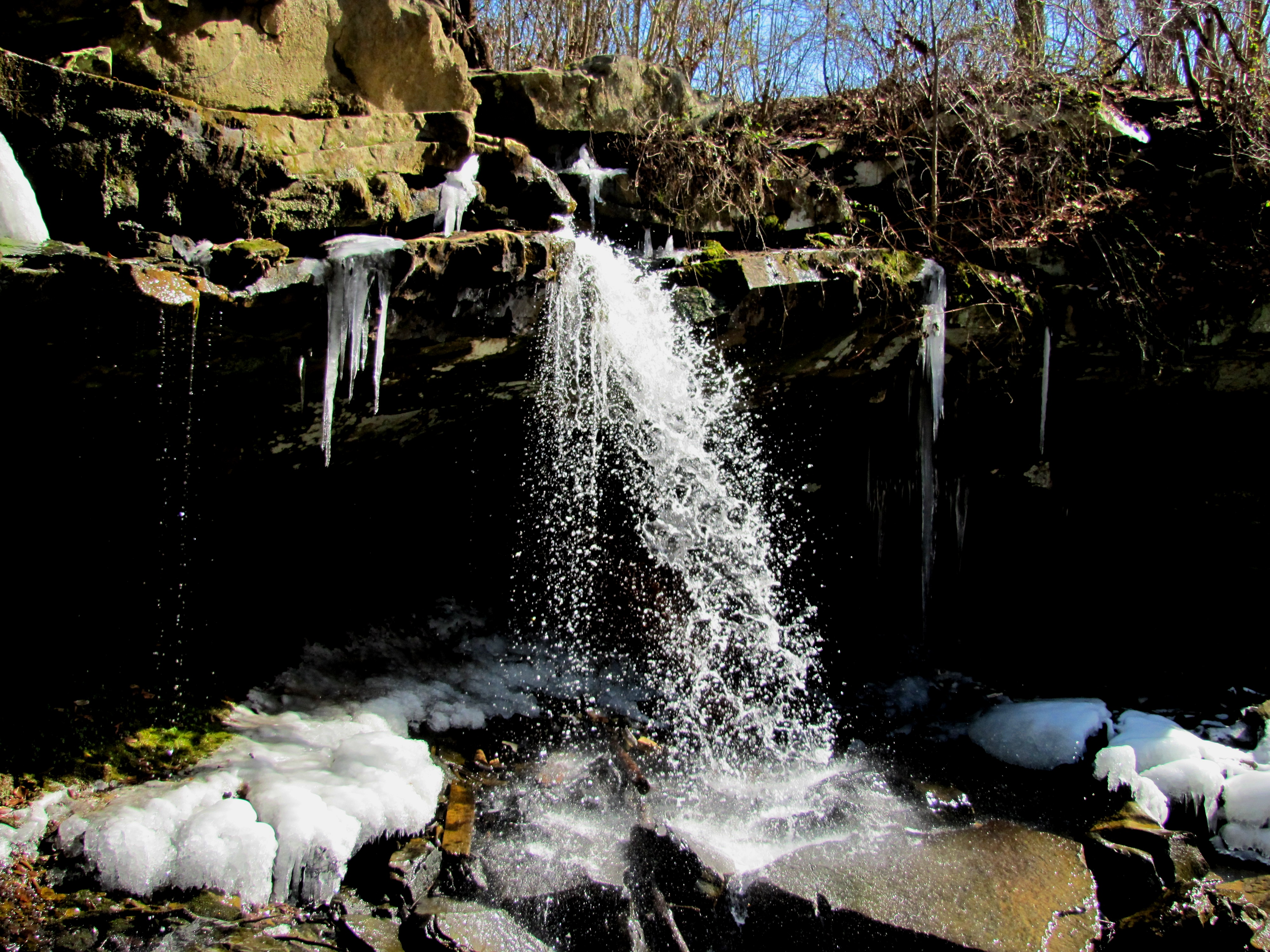
Waterfall along Town Spring, a tributary of New River

Huntsville is situated atop the Cumberland Plateau at just over 10 miles (16 km) west of the plateau's eastern escarpment. Huntsville's southern boundary is located along a series of cliffs overlooking New River, approximately 15 miles (24 km) upstream from the river's mouth along the Big South Fork of the Cumberland River. Huntsville is surrounded by low mountains and hills that comprise the southern section of the Cumberland Mountains.

Huntsville's town center is situated along State Route 63 (SR 63, Howard Baker Highway), although the town's municipal boundaries stretch westward to SR 63's junction with U.S. Route 27 (US 27, Scott Highway). SR 63 intersects Interstate 75 (I-75) approximately 15 miles (24 km) east of Huntsville, near the base of the Cumberland Plateau.

According to the United States Census Bureau, the town has a total area of 3.3 square miles (8.5 km^{2}), all of it land.

== Demographics ==
Historical population
Census	Pop.	Note	%±
1870	85		—
1880	116		36.5%
1890	149		28.4%
1970	337		—
1980	519		54.0%
1990	660		27.2%
2000	981		48.6%
2010	1,248		27.2%
2020	1,270		1.8%

=== 2020 census ===
Huntsville Racial Composition
Race	Num.	Perc.
White	1,238	97.48%
Black or African American	4	0.31%
Native American	3	0.24%
Asian	5	0.39%
Other/Mixed	15	1.18%
Hispanic or Latino	5	0.39%

As of the 2020 United States Census, there were 1,270 people, 537 households, and 249 families residing in the town.

=== 2000 census ===
As of the census of 2000, there were 981 people, 406 households, and 259 families residing in the town. The population density was 295.3 inhabitants per square mile (114.0/km^{2}). There were 441 housing units at an average density of 132.7 per square mile (51.2/km^{2}). The racial makeup of the town was 96.94% White, 1.12% African American, 0.61% Native American, 0.10% Asian, and 1.22% from two or more races. Hispanic or Latino of any race were 0.31% of the population.

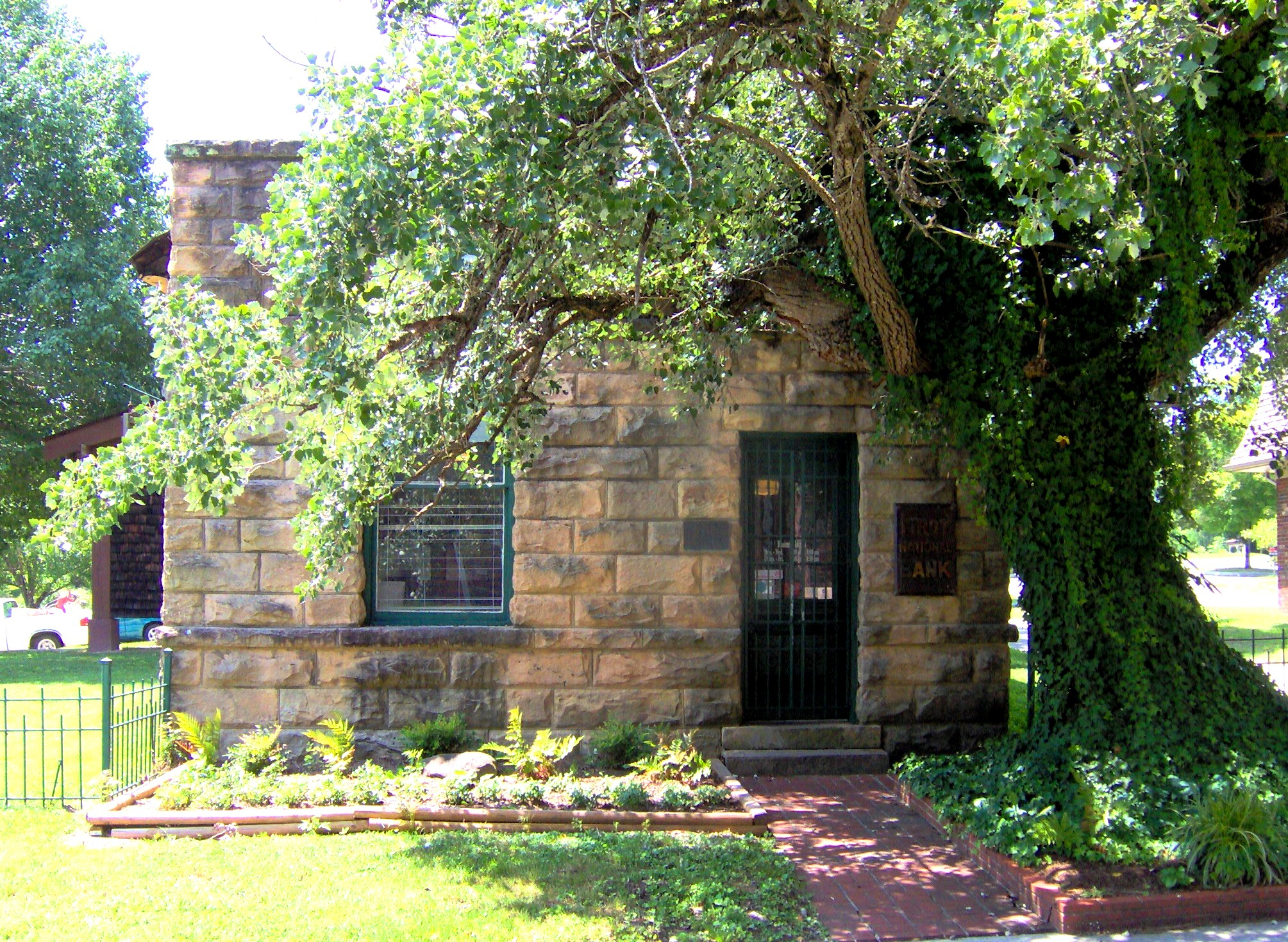
The First National Bank building in Huntsville, built in 1906.

There were 406 households, out of which 32.0% had children under the age of 18 living with them, 45.8% were married couples living together, 14.3% had a female householder with no husband present, and 36.0% were non-families. 33.0% of all households were made up of individuals, and 13.1% had someone living alone who was 65 years of age or older. The average household size was 2.31 and the average family size was 2.94.

In the town, the population was spread out, with 24.8% under the age of 18, 12.1% from 18 to 24, 28.4% from 25 to 44, 23.5% from 45 to 64, and 11.1% who were 65 years of age or older. The median age was 34 years. For every 100 females, there were 97.8 males. For every 100 females age 18 and over, there were 92.2 males.

The median income for a household in the town was $20,069, and the median income for a family was $25,804. Males had a median income of $26,902 versus $19,375 for females. The per capita income for the town was $16,469. About 17.2% of families and 24.1% of the population were below the poverty line, including 33.9% of those under age 18 and 16.4% of those age 65 or over.

== Media ==
- The Independent Herald
- Hive 105, WBNT-FM

== Notable people ==
- Howard Baker Jr., U.S. senator from Tennessee, Senate majority leader, and U.S. ambassador to Japan
- Howard Baker Sr., U.S. representative from Tennessee

== See also ==
- Huntsville High School (Tennessee)
