= Sharp Place, Tennessee =

Sharp Place
- Unincorporated community
- Location within Tennessee Location within the United States
- Coordinates: 36°30′32″N 84°49′40″W
- Country: United States
- State: Tennessee
- County: Fentress
- Time zone: UTC-6 (CST)
  - Summer (DST): UTC-5 (CDT)
- Area code: 931

Sharp Place is an unincorporated community in Fentress County, in the U.S. state of Tennessee.

== History ==
The community was likely named for one or more members of the Sharp family, who were known to be residing in the area in the mid-19th century.
