= Scott County, Tennessee =

County in Tennessee, United States

- County
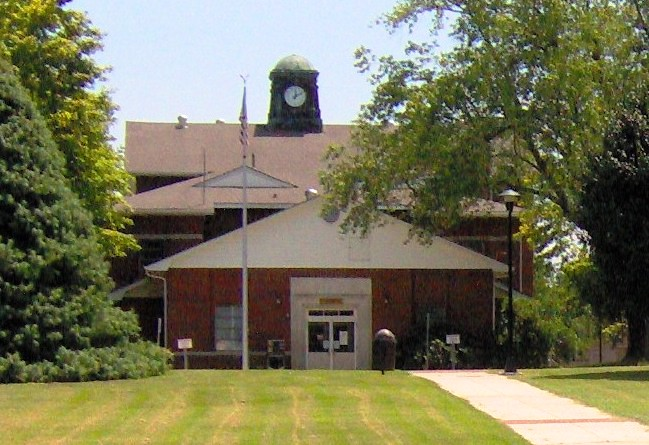
- Scott County Courthouse in Huntsville

- Location within the U.S. state of Tennessee
- Coordinates: 36°26′N 84°31′W
- Country: United States
- State: Tennessee
- Founded: 1849
- Named for: Winfield Scott
- Seat: Huntsville
- Largest town: Oneida

Area
  - Total: 533 sq mi (1,380 km^{2})
  - Land: 532 sq mi (1,380 km^{2})
  - Water: 0.9 sq mi (2.3 km^{2}) 0.2%

Population (2020)
  - Total: 22,039
  - Estimate (2025): 22,671 ▲
  - Density: 41/sq mi (16/km^{2})
- Time zone: UTC−5 (Eastern)
  - Summer (DST): UTC−4 (EDT)
- Congressional districts: 3rd, 6th
- Website: www.scottcounty.com

Scott County is a county located in the U.S. state of Tennessee. As of the 2020 census, its population was 22,039, down from 22,228 at the 2010 census. Its county seat is Huntsville and the largest town is Oneida. Scott County is known for having seceded from Tennessee in protest of the state's decision to join the Confederacy during the Civil War, and subsequently forming The Free and Independent State of Scott.

== History ==
Scott County was formed in 1849 from portions of Anderson, Campbell, Fentress and Morgan counties. It is named for U.S. Army General Winfield Scott, a hero of the Mexican War.

=== State of Scott ===
During the Civil War, the county was a Southern Unionist bastion, voting against secession from the Union in Tennessee's June 1861 referendum by a higher percentage (521 to 19, or 96%) than in any other Tennessee county. This sentiment was encouraged by a June 4, 1861, speech in Huntsville by U.S. Senator Andrew Johnson. In 1861, the county assembly officially enacted a resolution seceding from the state of Tennessee, and thus the Confederacy, forming the "Free and Independent State of Scott," also known simply as the "State of Scott." The county remained a pro-Union enclave throughout the war. Ulysses S. Grant received over 90% of the vote in Scott County during both the 1868 United States presidential election and the 1872 United States presidential election.

The proclamation was finally repealed, over a hundred years later, by Scott County in 1986.

== Geography ==
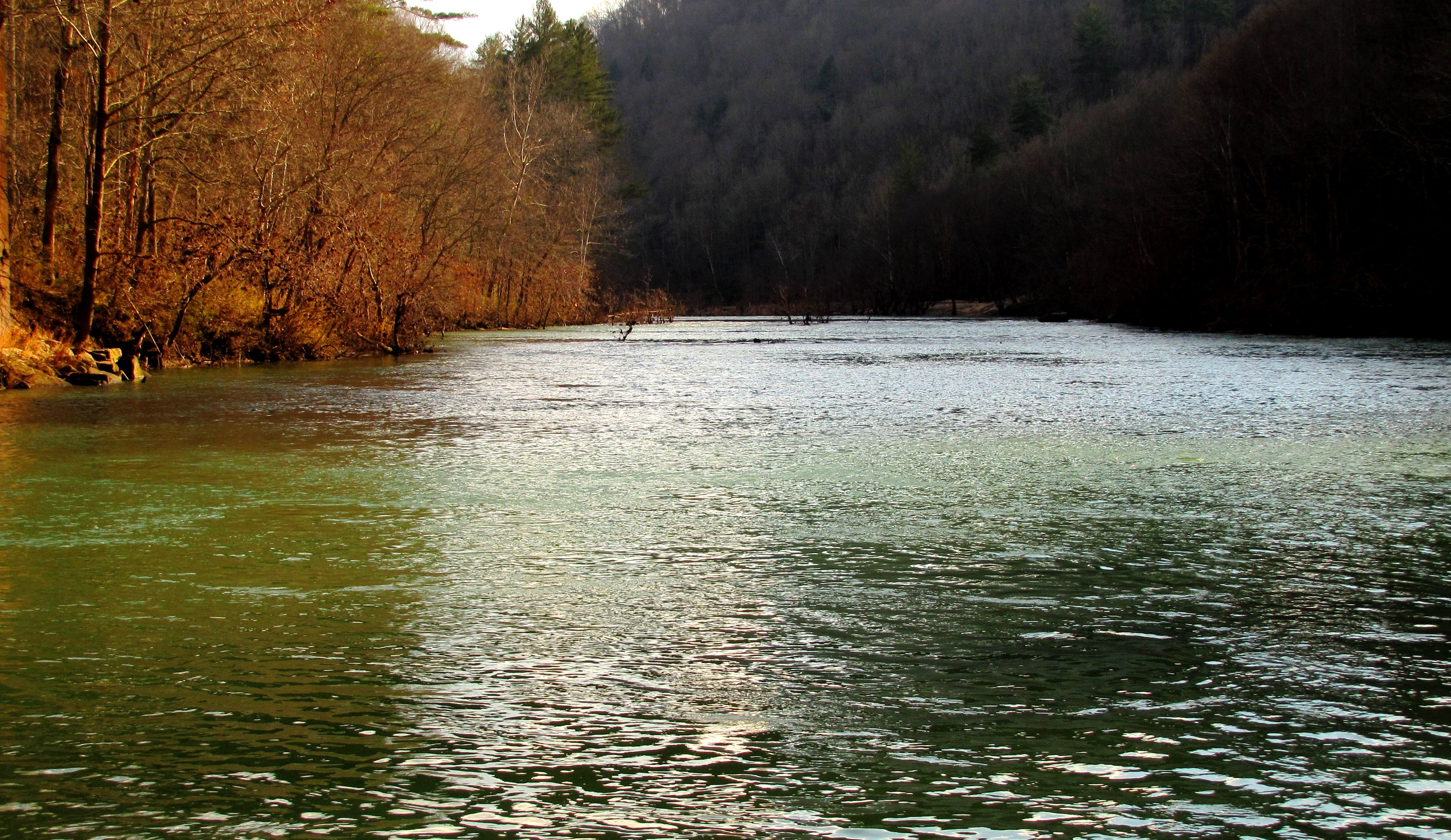
Big South Fork of the Cumberland

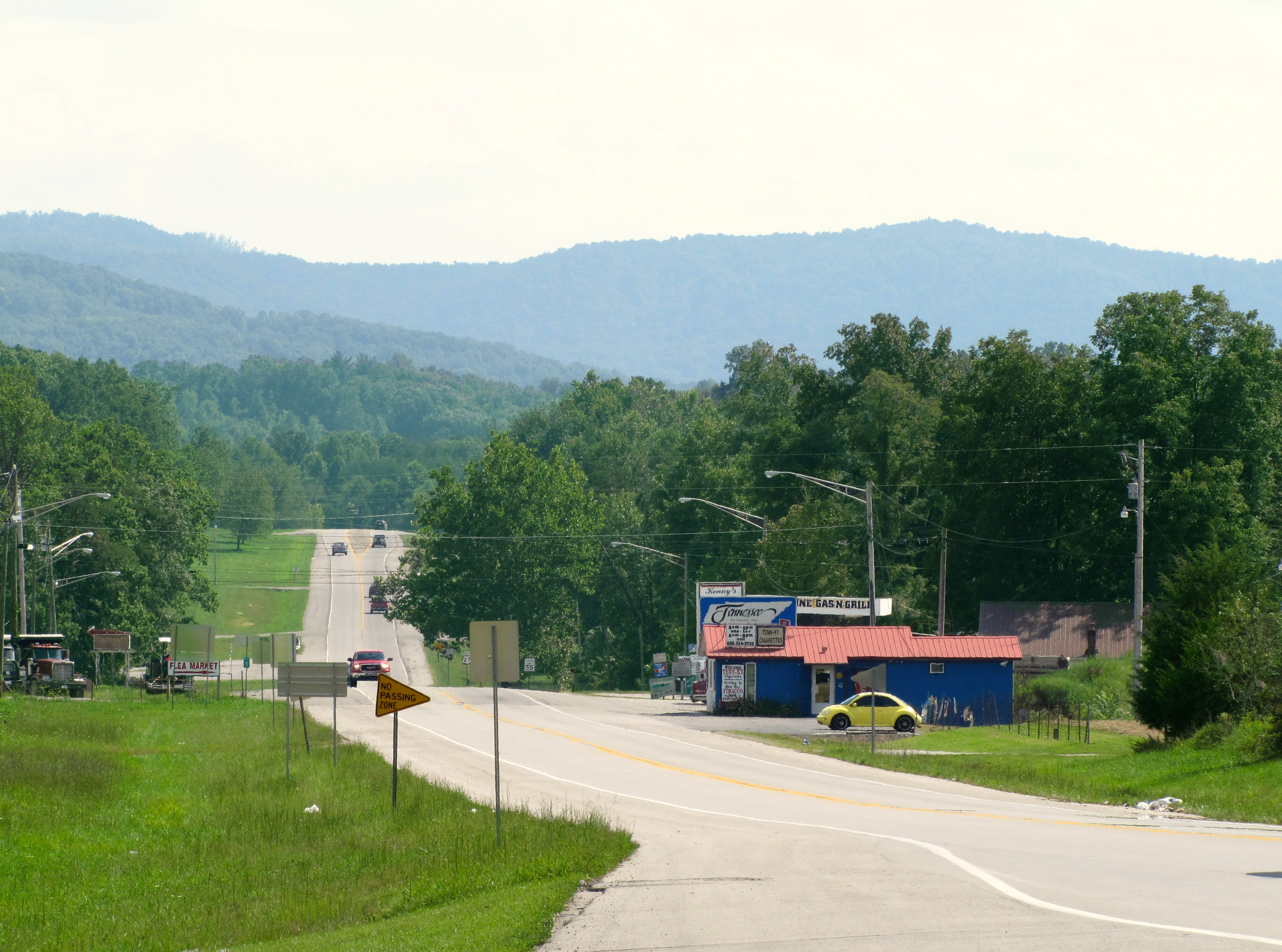
US-27 at the Tennessee-Kentucky state line, looking south into Scott County

According to the U.S. Census Bureau, the county has a total area of 533 square miles (1,380 km^{2}), of which 532 square miles (1,380 km^{2}) is land and 0.9 square miles (2.3 km^{2}) (0.2%) is water. The county is located in a relatively hilly area atop the Cumberland Plateau. In the southwestern part of the county, the Clear Fork and New River converge to form the Big South Fork of the Cumberland River, a major tributary of the Cumberland River, and the focus of a national river and recreation area.

U.S. Route 27 is the county's primary north–south road. State Route 63 connects Scott County with Campbell County to the east. State Route 52 connects Scott County with the Fentress County area to the west. A portion of State Route 297 connects Oneida with the Big South Fork Recreation Area. State Route 456 is another major road in the area.

Scott County, a part of the Cumberland Plateau, includes the majority of the Big South Fork National River and Recreation Area.

Scott County is in the Eastern Time Zone, but Fentress and Pickett counties that border Scott on the west observe Central Time.

=== Adjacent counties ===
- McCreary County, Kentucky (north)
- Campbell County (east)
- Anderson County (southeast)
- Morgan County (southwest)
- Fentress County (west)
- Pickett County (northwest)
- Wayne County, Kentucky (northwest)

=== National protected area ===
- Big South Fork National River and Recreation Area (part)

=== State protected areas ===
- North Cumberland Wildlife Management Area (part)
- Scott State Forest (part)
- Twin Arches State Natural Area (part)

== Demographics ==
Historical population
Census	Pop.	Note	%±
1850	1,905		—
1860	3,519		84.7%
1870	4,054		15.2%
1880	6,021		48.5%
1890	9,794		62.7%
1900	11,077		13.1%
1910	12,947		16.9%
1920	13,411		3.6%
1930	14,080		5.0%
1940	15,966		13.4%
1950	17,362		8.7%
1960	15,413		−11.2%
1970	14,762		−4.2%
1980	19,259		30.5%
1990	18,358		−4.7%
2000	21,127		15.1%
2010	22,228		5.2%
2020	21,850		−1.7%
2025 (est.)	22,671	▲	3.8%
Sources: 1790-1960; 1900-1990; 1990-2000; 2010-2014

=== Racial and ethnic composition ===
Scott County, Tennessee – Racial and ethnic composition Note: the US Census treats Hispanic/Latino as an ethnic category. This table excludes Latinos from the racial categories and assigns them to a separate category. Hispanics/Latinos may be of any race.
Race / ethnicity (NH = Non-Hispanic)	Pop 1980	Pop 1990	Pop 2000	Pop 2010	Pop 2020	% 1980	% 1990	% 2000	% 2010	% 2020
White alone (NH)	19,008	18,234	20,721	21,795	20,957	98.70%	99.32%	98.08%	98.05%	95.91%
Black or African American alone (NH)	6	5	19	19	32	0.03%	0.03%	0.09%	0.09%	0.15%
Native American or Alaska Native alone (NH)	69	67	52	55	36	0.36%	0.36%	0.25%	0.25%	0.16%
Asian alone (NH)	14	11	25	42	51	0.07%	0.06%	0.12%	0.19%	0.23%
Native Hawaiian or Pacific Islander alone (NH)	x	x	0	1	0	x	x	0.00%	0.00%	0.00%
Other race alone (NH)	3	3	4	13	6	0.02%	0.02%	0.02%	0.06%	0.03%
Mixed race or Multiracial (NH)	x	x	186	183	563	x	x	0.88%	0.82%	2.58%
Hispanic or Latino (any race)	159	38	120	120	205	0.83%	0.21%	0.57%	0.54%	0.94%
Total	19,259	18,358	21,127	22,228	21,850	100.00%	100.00%	100.00%	100.00%	100.00%

=== 2020 census ===
As of the 2020 census, the county had a population of 21,850, 8,625 households, and 6,059 families. The median age was 40.4 years, 24.3% of residents were under the age of 18, and 17.5% of residents were 65 years of age or older. For every 100 females there were 97.6 males, and for every 100 females age 18 and over there were 95.2 males age 18 and over.

Of the households, 32.7% had children under the age of 18 living in them, 47.6% were married-couple households, 18.9% had a male householder with no spouse or partner present, 27.3% had a female householder with no spouse or partner present, 28.0% were made up of individuals, and 13.1% had someone living alone who was 65 years of age or older.

There were 9,802 housing units, of which 12.0% were vacant. Among occupied housing units, 72.2% were owner-occupied and 27.8% were renter-occupied, with a homeowner vacancy rate of 1.3% and a rental vacancy rate of 8.2%.

Less than 0.1% of residents lived in urban areas, while 100.0% lived in rural areas.

=== 2000 census ===
At the 2000 census, there were 21,127 people, 8,203 households and 6,012 families residing in the county. The population density was 40 people per square mile (15 people/km^{2}). There were 8,909 housing units at an average density of 17 units per square mile (6.6/km^{2}). The racial makeup of the county was 98.53% White, 0.09% Black or African American, 0.25% Native American, 0.12% Asian, 0.10% from other races, and 0.91% from two or more races. 0.57% of the population were Hispanic or Latino of any race.

There were 8,203 households, of which 35.70% had children under the age of 18 living with them, 57.20% were married couples living together, 11.80% had a female householder with no husband present, and 26.70% were non-families. 24.30% of all households were made up of individuals, and 9.50% had someone living alone who was 65 years of age or older. The average household size was 2.55 and the average family size was 3.02.

26.10% of the population were under the age of 18, 10.30% from 18 to 24, 28.70% from 25 to 44, 23.60% from 45 to 64, and 11.30% who were 65 years of age or older. The median age was 35 years. For every 100 females there were 97.40 males. For every 100 females age 18 and over, there were 94.00 males.

The median household income was $24,093 and the median family income was $28,595. Males had a median income of $24,721 compared with $19,451 for females. The per capita income for the county was $12,927. About 17.60% of families and 20.20% of the population were below the poverty line, including 24.10% of those under age 18 and 17.10% of those age 65 or over.

=== 2010 ancestry ===
As of 2010, the largest self-reported ancestry groups in the county were:

- American - 18.1%
- English - 16.7%
- Irish - 8.4%
- German - 4.2%
- Scots-Irish - 3.2%
- Scottish - 2.0%
- Italian - 1.2%
- Polish - 1.1%

== Education ==
Scott County School District (Website)

- Burchfield Elementary School; "The Rams" (Website)
- Farview Elementary School; "The Rebels" (Website)
- Huntsville Elementary School; "The Bears" (Website)
- Huntsville Middle School; "The Bears" (Website)
- Robbins Elementary School; "The Hawks" (Website)
- Scott High School; "The Highlanders" (Website)
- Winfield Elementary School; "The Bobcats" (Website)

Oneida Special School District (Website)

- Oneida Elementary School; "The Indians" (Website)
- Oneida Middle School; "The Indians" (Website)
- Oneida High School; "The Indians" (Website)

Private schools

- Landmark Christian School

== Public safety ==
Includes the Scott County Sheriff Department; Oneida and Winfield Police Department; a full-time ambulance service with two stations; a volunteer rescue squad; and nine volunteer fire stations placed throughout the county.

== Media ==
- The Independent Herald
- The Scott County News
- Hive 105, WBNT-FM

== Communities ==
=== Towns ===
- Huntsville (county seat)
- Oneida
- Winfield

=== Census-designated places ===
- Elgin
- Helenwood
- Robbins

=== Unincorporated communities ===
- Isham
- Montgomery
- New River
- Rugby (partial)
- Winona

== Politics ==
United States presidential election results for Scott County, Tennessee
Year	Republican		Democratic		Third party(ies)	
Year	No.	%	No.	%	No.	%
1912	123	7.49%	160	9.74%	1,359	82.76%
1916	1,486	82.24%	206	11.40%	115	6.36%
1920	2,537	90.54%	221	7.89%	44	1.57%
1924	1,611	77.71%	274	13.22%	188	9.07%
1928	2,700	91.59%	244	8.28%	4	0.14%
1932	1,890	64.29%	1,025	34.86%	25	0.85%
1936	2,012	70.67%	827	29.05%	8	0.28%
1940	2,187	59.93%	1,448	39.68%	14	0.38%
1944	1,971	69.60%	850	30.01%	11	0.39%
1948	2,016	66.67%	972	32.14%	36	1.19%
1952	3,274	73.82%	1,161	26.18%	0	0.00%
1956	3,282	79.10%	842	20.29%	25	0.60%
1960	3,301	74.84%	1,098	24.89%	12	0.27%
1964	2,406	54.52%	2,007	45.48%	0	0.00%
1968	2,406	58.24%	991	23.99%	734	17.77%
1972	2,775	79.24%	679	19.39%	48	1.37%
1976	2,432	51.42%	2,260	47.78%	38	0.80%
1980	3,014	62.38%	1,724	35.68%	94	1.95%
1984	3,107	62.63%	1,810	36.48%	44	0.89%
1988	2,562	61.10%	1,611	38.42%	20	0.48%
1992	3,011	46.91%	2,730	42.54%	677	10.55%
1996	2,646	46.94%	2,506	44.46%	485	8.60%
2000	3,579	54.10%	2,967	44.85%	69	1.04%
2004	4,509	59.11%	3,086	40.46%	33	0.43%
2008	4,931	72.70%	1,720	25.36%	132	1.95%
2012	5,117	76.74%	1,452	21.78%	99	1.48%
2016	6,044	84.85%	934	13.11%	145	2.04%
2020	8,004	88.42%	986	10.89%	62	0.68%
2024	8,608	89.62%	942	9.81%	55	0.57%

== Notable people ==
- Howard Baker Sr.- U.S. Representative for Tennessee's 2nd congressional district.
- Howard Baker Jr. - U.S. senator from Tennessee; first Republican elected to the U.S. senate from Tennessee since Reconstruction.
- Mike Duncan- Former chairman of the Republican National Committee. Former governor of The United States Postal Service. Former chairman of The Tennessee Valley Authority.
- Sparky Woods- Former college football coach.
- Mike Marlar- American dirt track and stock car racing driver.
- Anthony Smith (singer)- American singer, songwriter and record producer.
- Harry Stonecipher- American business executive.
- Susie Peters- American preservationist and matron at the Anadarko Agency.
- Lena B. Smithers Hughes- American botanist
- Josephus S. Cecil- A United States Army officer who received the Medal of Honor for his actions during the Philippine–American War.
- Bruce Fairchild Barton- An American author, advertising executive, and Republican politician.
- John Duncan Sr.- An American attorney and Republican politician.

== See also ==
- National Register of Historic Places listings in Scott County, Tennessee
