= Pickett CCC Memorial State Park =

Pickett Civilian Conservation Corps Memorial State Park
- Pickett State Park
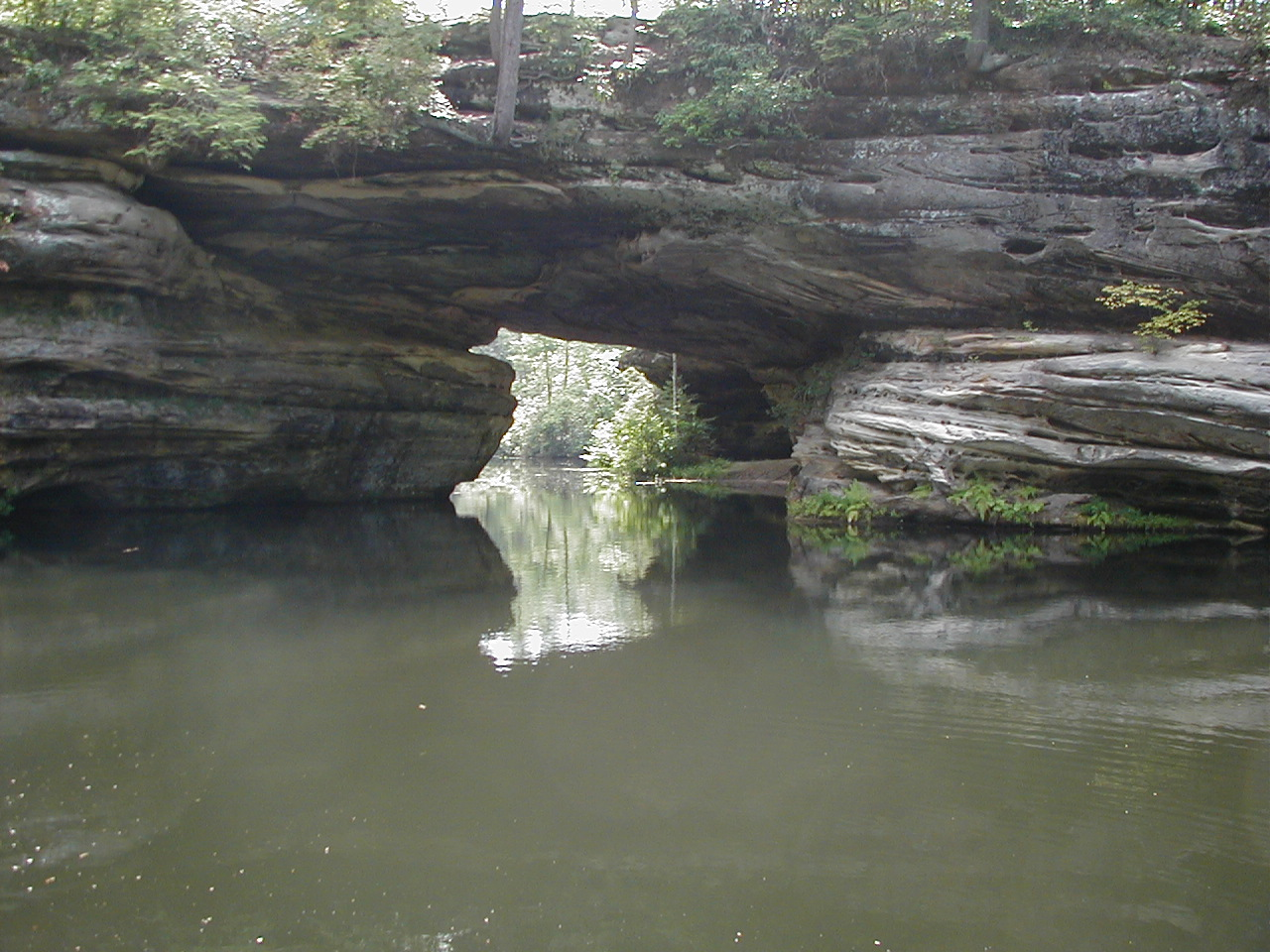
- Arch Lake in Pickett State Park

- Location within Tennessee
- Type: Tennessee State Park
- Location: Pickett County, near Jamestown, Tennessee
- Coordinates: 36.55157°N 84.79703°W
- Area: 19,200 acres (78 km^{2})
- Operator: Tennessee Department of Environment and Conservation
- Open: open year round
- Website: Pickett CCC Memorial State Park
- Pickett State Rustic Park Historic District
- U.S. National Register of Historic Places
- U.S. Historic district
- Built: 1934-1942
- Built by: Civilian Conservation Corps
- Architect: Works Project Administration, National Park Service
- NRHP reference No.: 86002795
- Added to NRHP: 1986

Pickett Civilian Conservation Corps Memorial State Park (also known simply as Pickett State Park or Pickett CCC Memorial State Park) is a Tennessee state park in the upper Cumberland Mountains. It is located in Pickett County, northeast of the city of Jamestown, and is adjacent to the Big South Fork National River and Recreation Area. The park is located on 19,200 acres (78 km^{2}) of wilderness including caves, natural bridges, and other rock formations. About 1,000 acres (4.0 km^{2}) are managed by the Tennessee Department of Environment and Conservation as a state park, and the remainder of the property is managed by the Tennessee Division of Forestry as a state forest.

The park was developed by the Civilian Conservation Corps (CCC) between 1934 and 1942 on about 12,000 acres (49 km^{2}) of land donated to the State of Tennessee in 1933 by the Stearns Coal and Lumber Company. CCC crews built hiking trails, a recreation lodge, a ranger station, five rustic cabins, and a 12-acre (4.9 ha) lake known as Arch Lake. Locally quarried sandstone was used in constructing most of the buildings. The original park facilities are listed on the National Register of Historic Places. Pickett's land area has increased over time as a result of additional land donations and acquisitions, and additional park facilities were built beginning in the 1950s.

In 2015, Pickett State Park was classed as a Dark Sky Park by the International Dark-sky Association. These are areas generally free of artificial light pollution, making them optimal places for stargazing.

The park offers boating, camping, lodging, hiking and many other activities.

== Facilities ==
The park's facilities include 32 campsites and 20 rental cabins. The campsites come with electric and water hookups and have both picnic tables and grills. The campground has a modern bathhouse and a dump station. It is open year-round on a first-come, first-served basis, with a maximum stay limit of two weeks. Of the 20 cabins, there are four types. The first is a rustic CCC cabin that accommodates four people, the second is a Deluxe Cabin that will accommodate up to six people, the third is a Chalet cabin that will accommodate two people, and the last is a Villa cabin that can accommodate up to eight people. Each cabin comes with the following amenities:

- Full Modern Bathrooms
- Kitchen Appliances
- Cooking Utensils
- Linens and Towels
- Fireplaces

All cabins are available by reservation (up to one year in advance) year round, excepting two rustic units. One deluxe cabin is designated as a pet cabin.

== Attractions ==
At Hazard Cave, the park is home to a species of glow worm discovered in 1975, that is found only in very particular places in the United States, another place being the Big South Fork National Recreation Area. The glow worms are in fact insect larvae of the fungus gnat (Ofelia fultoni). In the dark confines of the Hazard Cave rock house, these glow worms emit blue, glowing light on the cave walls and the surrounding vegetation. These larvae can be seen throughout the year, but are the best and brightest in the early weeks of June.
