= WBNT-FM =

Radio station in Oneida, Tennessee

- Oneida, Tennessee; United States
- Frequency: 105.5 MHz
- Branding: Hive 105

Programming
- Format: Adult contemporary
- Affiliations: Citadel Media

Ownership
- Owner: Oneida Broadcasters, Incorporated

History
- First air date: June 10, 1965

Technical information
- Licensing authority: FCC
- Facility ID: 50360
- Class: A
- ERP: 3,000 watts
- HAAT: 87.0 meters (285.4 ft)
- Transmitter coordinates: 36°30′3.00″N 84°29′24.00″W

Links
- Public license information: Public file; LMS
- Webcast: Listen live
- Website: thehive105.com

WBNT-FM (105.5 FM, "Hive 105") is a radio station broadcasting an adult contemporary music format. Licensed to Oneida, Tennessee, United States, the station is currently owned by Oneida Broadcasters, Incorporated and features programming from Citadel Media.
