= Oneida, Tennessee =

- Town
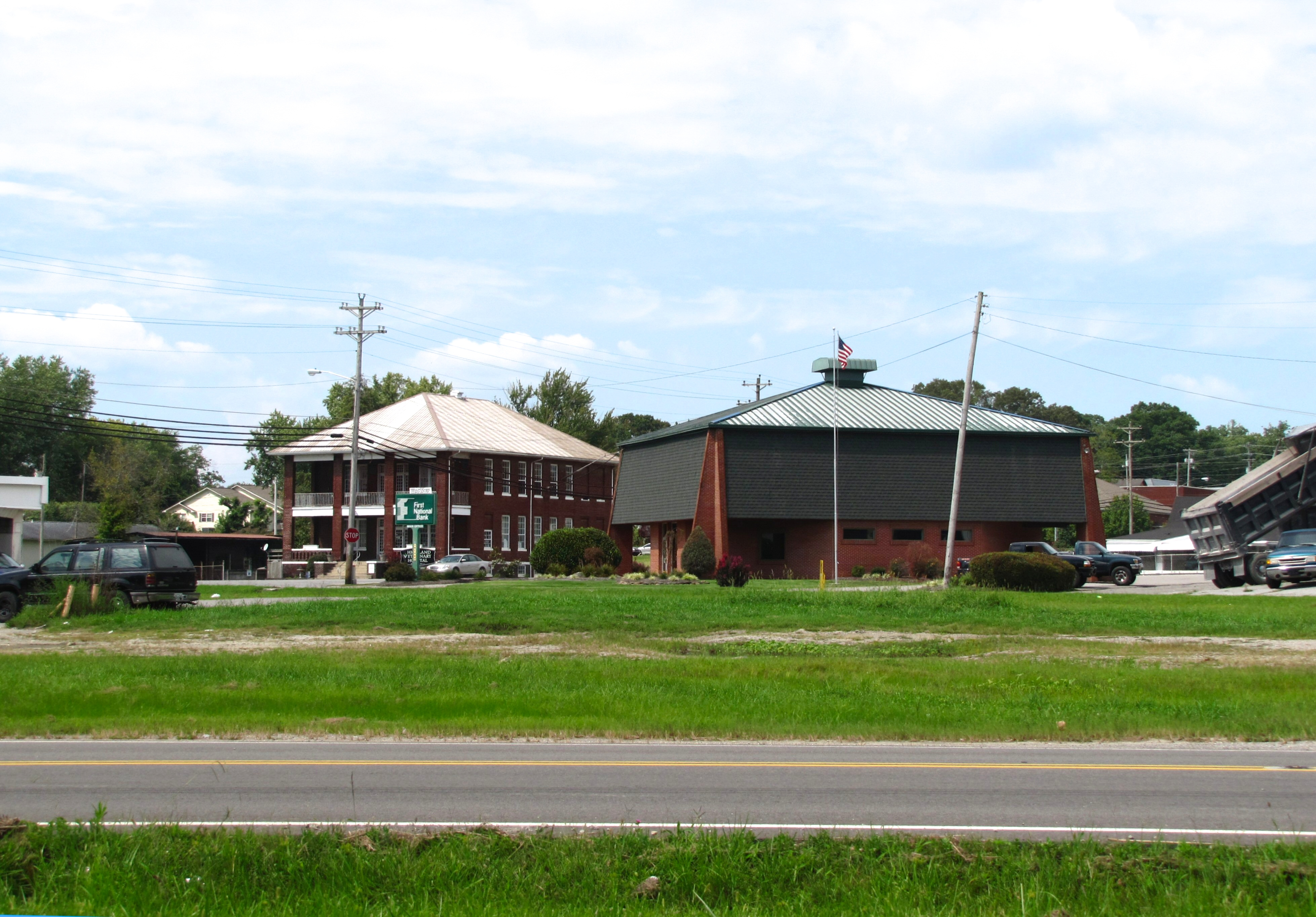

- Location of Oneida in Scott County, Tennessee.
- Coordinates: 36°30′2″N 84°31′0″W
- Country: United States
- State: Tennessee
- County: Scott
- Established: 1880s
- First Charter: 1905
- Incorporated: March 22, 1917
- Named for: Oneida, New York

Government
  - Type: Mayor-Council
  - Mayor: Lori Phillips-Jones

Area
  - Total: 9.53 sq mi (24.69 km^{2})
  - Land: 9.39 sq mi (24.31 km^{2})
  - Water: 0.15 sq mi (0.38 km^{2})
- Elevation: 1,444 ft (440 m)

Population (2020)
  - Total: 3,787
  - Density: 403.5/sq mi (155.79/km^{2})
- Time zone: UTC-5 (Eastern (EST))
  - Summer (DST): UTC-4 (EDT)
- ZIP code: 37841
- Area code: 423
- FIPS code: 47-55860
- GNIS feature ID: 1329062
- Website: www.townofoneida.com

Oneida is a town in Scott County, Tennessee, United States. The population was 3,787 at the 2020 census.

Oneida is known for its proximity to the Big South Fork National River and Recreation Area. The town is named for Oneida, New York, the home of several railroad executives who helped develop the town in the late 19th century.

== Geography ==
Oneida is located at 36°30′2″N 84°31′0″W (36.500535, -84.516553).

According to the United States Census Bureau, the town has a total area of 10.3 square miles (27 km^{2}), of which 10.2 square miles (26 km^{2}) is land and 0.1 square miles (0.26 km^{2}) (1.36%) is water.

=== Climate ===
Climate data for Oneida, Tennessee (1991–2020 normals, extremes 1959–present)
Month	Jan	Feb	Mar	Apr	May	Jun	Jul	Aug	Sep	Oct	Nov	Dec	Year
Record high °F (°C)	74 (23)	79 (26)	86 (30)	90 (32)	92 (33)	95 (35)	103 (39)	101 (38)	98 (37)	92 (33)	85 (29)	77 (25)	103 (39)
Mean maximum °F (°C)	64.6 (18.1)	68.3 (20.2)	75.7 (24.3)	82.5 (28.1)	86.4 (30.2)	90.0 (32.2)	92.2 (33.4)	91.5 (33.1)	89.6 (32.0)	82.6 (28.1)	73.8 (23.2)	65.0 (18.3)	93.4 (34.1)
Mean daily maximum °F (°C)	45.0 (7.2)	49.2 (9.6)	58.0 (14.4)	68.4 (20.2)	75.9 (24.4)	82.3 (27.9)	85.4 (29.7)	84.6 (29.2)	79.6 (26.4)	69.3 (20.7)	58.0 (14.4)	48.6 (9.2)	67.0 (19.4)
Daily mean °F (°C)	34.8 (1.6)	38.2 (3.4)	45.3 (7.4)	54.9 (12.7)	63.1 (17.3)	70.8 (21.6)	74.6 (23.7)	73.3 (22.9)	67.2 (19.6)	55.5 (13.1)	45.1 (7.3)	38.2 (3.4)	55.1 (12.8)
Mean daily minimum °F (°C)	24.5 (−4.2)	27.1 (−2.7)	32.5 (0.3)	41.3 (5.2)	50.3 (10.2)	59.2 (15.1)	63.9 (17.7)	62.0 (16.7)	54.8 (12.7)	41.8 (5.4)	32.3 (0.2)	27.8 (−2.3)	43.1 (6.2)
Mean minimum °F (°C)	4.1 (−15.5)	9.4 (−12.6)	16.0 (−8.9)	25.6 (−3.6)	34.6 (1.4)	47.5 (8.6)	54.5 (12.5)	53.0 (11.7)	40.1 (4.5)	26.9 (−2.8)	18.0 (−7.8)	11.7 (−11.3)	1.1 (−17.2)
Record low °F (°C)	−26 (−32)	−11 (−24)	−11 (−24)	16 (−9)	25 (−4)	33 (1)	43 (6)	42 (6)	30 (−1)	17 (−8)	1 (−17)	−18 (−28)	−26 (−32)
Average precipitation inches (mm)	5.15 (131)	5.06 (129)	5.70 (145)	5.25 (133)	4.89 (124)	4.80 (122)	5.63 (143)	4.51 (115)	3.97 (101)	3.32 (84)	3.81 (97)	6.03 (153)	58.12 (1,476)
Average snowfall inches (cm)	2.2 (5.6)	1.5 (3.8)	0.8 (2.0)	0.0 (0.0)	0.0 (0.0)	0.0 (0.0)	0.0 (0.0)	0.0 (0.0)	0.0 (0.0)	0.0 (0.0)	0.0 (0.0)	1.0 (2.5)	5.5 (14)
Average precipitation days (≥ 0.01 in)	11.4	10.9	11.8	11.1	12.0	12.0	11.7	9.2	8.7	8.6	9.2	12.3	128.9
Average snowy days (≥ 0.1 in)	0.7	1.0	0.2	0.0	0.0	0.0	0.0	0.0	0.0	0.0	0.0	0.6	2.5
Source: NOAA

== Demographics ==
Historical population
Census	Pop.	Note	%±
1920	943		—
1930	1,382		46.6%
1940	1,252		−9.4%
1950	1,304		4.2%
1960	2,480		90.2%
1970	2,602		4.9%
1980	3,494		34.3%
1990	3,502		0.2%
2000	3,615		3.2%
2010	3,752		3.8%
2020	3,787		0.9%

=== 2020 census ===
Oneida racial composition
Race	Number	Percentage
White (non-Hispanic)	3,568	94.22%
Black or African American (non-Hispanic)	10	0.26%
Native American	9	0.24%
Asian	28	0.74%
Other/Mixed	113	2.98%
Hispanic or Latino	59	1.56%

As of the 2020 census, Oneida had a population of 3,787. The median age was 38.7 years. 24.7% of residents were under the age of 18 and 20.0% of residents were 65 years of age or older. For every 100 females there were 86.9 males, and for every 100 females age 18 and over there were 83.4 males age 18 and over.

0.0% of residents lived in urban areas, while 100.0% lived in rural areas.

There were 1,589 households in Oneida, of which 32.1% had children under the age of 18 living in them. Of all households, 37.1% were married-couple households, 19.4% were households with a male householder and no spouse or partner present, and 36.2% were households with a female householder and no spouse or partner present. About 34.0% of all households were made up of individuals and 16.4% had someone living alone who was 65 years of age or older.

There were 1,818 housing units, of which 12.6% were vacant. The homeowner vacancy rate was 2.5% and the rental vacancy rate was 9.8%.

=== 2000 census ===
As of the census of 2000, there were 3,615 people, 1,588 households, and 986 families residing in the town. The population density was 355.4 inhabitants per square mile (137.2/km^{2}). There were 1,715 housing units at an average density of 168.6 per square mile (65.1/km^{2}). The racial makeup of the town was 98.34% White, 0.03% African American, 0.14% Native American, 0.39% Asian, 0.19% from other races, and 0.91% from two or more races. Hispanic or Latino of any race were 0.30% of the population.

There were 1,588 households, out of which 30.8% had children under the age of 18 living with them, 43.3% were married couples living together, 15.4% had a female householder with no husband present, and 37.9% were non-families. 35.5% of all households were made up of individuals, and 14.5% had someone living alone who was 65 years of age or older. The average household size was 2.24 and the average family size was 2.91.

In the town, the population was spread out, with 24.3% under the age of 18, 10.1% from 18 to 24, 25.9% from 25 to 44, 24.0% from 45 to 64, and 15.7% who were 65 years of age or older. The median age was 38 years. For every 100 females, there were 85.4 males. For every 100 females age 18 and over, there were 81.7 males.

The median income for a household in the town was $23,767, and the median income for a family was $29,786. Males had a median income of $23,571 versus $24,516 for females. The per capita income for the town was $13,906. About 18.8% of families and 21.1% of the population were below the poverty line, including 26.4% of those under age 18 and 11.5% of those age 65 or over.

== Media ==
- The Independent Herald
- Hive 105, WBNT-FM
- MBRTV Channel 5
- The Scott County News The county's oldest newspaper, established in 1916.
