= National Register of Historic Places listings in Fentress County, Tennessee =

Location of Fentress County in Tennessee

This is a list of the National Register of Historic Places listings in Fentress County, Tennessee.

This is intended to be a complete list of the properties and districts on the National Register of Historic Places in Fentress County, Tennessee, United States. Latitude and longitude coordinates are provided for many National Register properties and districts; these locations may be seen together in a map.

There are 12 properties and districts listed on the National Register in the county, including 1 National Historic Landmark.

Contents: Counties in Tennessee
Anderson – Bedford – Benton – Bledsoe – Blount – Bradley – Campbell – Cannon – Carroll – Carter – Cheatham – Chester – Claiborne – Clay – Cocke – Coffee – Crockett – Cumberland – Davidson – Decatur – DeKalb – Dickson – Dyer – Fayette – Fentress – Franklin – Gibson – Giles – Grainger – Greene – Grundy – Hamblen – Hamilton – Hancock – Hardeman – Hardin – Hawkins – Haywood – Henderson – Henry – Hickman – Houston – Humphreys – Jackson – Jefferson – Johnson – Knox – Lake – Lauderdale – Lawrence – Lewis – Lincoln – Loudon – Macon – Madison – Marion – Marshall – Maury – McMinn – McNairy – Meigs – Monroe – Montgomery – Moore – Morgan – Obion – Overton – Perry – Pickett – Polk – Putnam – Rhea – Roane – Robertson – Rutherford – Scott – Sequatchie – Sevier – Shelby – Smith – Stewart – Sullivan – Sumner – Tipton – Trousdale – Unicoi – Union – Van Buren – Warren – Washington – Wayne – Weakley – White – Williamson – Wilson

This National Park Service list is complete through NPS recent listings posted March 14, 2025.

== Current listings ==
| | Name on the Register | Image | Date listed | Location | City or town | Description |
|---|---|---|---|---|---|---|
| 1 | Allardt Historic District | Allardt Historic District | October 29, 1991 (#91001593) | Junction of State Route 52 and Base Line Rd. 36°22′46″N 84°52′31″W | Allardt | |
| 2 | Allardt Presbyterian Church | Allardt Presbyterian Church | July 3, 1991 (#91000818) | State Route 52; 36°22′55″N 84°53′03″W | Allardt | Carpenter Gothic-style church |
| 3 | James Beaty General Merchandise Store | James Beaty General Merchandise Store | December 18, 2013 (#13000947) | 5004 Alvin York Hwy. 36°16′01″N 84°59′05″W | Grimsley | General store built in 1924 |
| 4 | Davidson School | Davidson School | January 7, 1993 (#92001739) | State Route 85; 36°16′42″N 85°06′16″W | Davidson | Built in 1909 to serve the remote Davidson mining community |
| 5 | Forbus Historic District | Forbus Historic District | July 3, 1991 (#91000821) | State Route 28 (U.S. Route 127) west of Pall Mall; 36°33′54″N 85°00′42″W | Forbus | |
| 6 | Gernt Office | Gernt Office | July 3, 1991 (#91000819) | State Route 52; 36°22′51″N 84°53′02″W | Allardt | Offices of the Allardt Land Company, which colonized the area in the late 19th-century |
| 7 | Bruno Gernt House | Bruno Gernt House | March 6, 1987 (#87000391) | Base Line Rd. 36°22′44″N 84°52′20″W | Allardt | Homestead of Bruno Gernt (1851-1932), founder of Allardt |
| 8 | Old Fentress County Jail | Old Fentress County Jail | May 24, 1984 (#84003536) | N. Smith St. and State Route 52; 36°25′40″N 84°55′57″W | Jamestown | Now the Ye Olde Jail Museum |
| 9 | Sergeant York Historic Area | Sergeant York Historic Area | April 11, 1973 (#73001763) | Off the Alvin York Highway; 36°32′52″N 84°57′44″W | Pall Mall | |
| 10 | Alvin C. York Agricultural Institute Historic District | Alvin C. York Agricultural Institute Historic District | September 20, 1991 (#91001378) | U.S. Route 127 south of its junction with State Route 154; 36°26′40″N 84°56′13″W | Jamestown | |
| 11 | Alvin Cullom York Farm | Alvin Cullom York Farm | May 11, 1976 (#76001773) | U.S. Route 127; 36°32′36″N 84°57′35″W | Pall Mall | |
| 12 | Youngs Historic District | Youngs Historic District | October 16, 1991 (#91000820) | Junction of Indiana and Portland Aves. 36°22′44″N 84°53′02″W | Allardt | This section south of Indiana Avenue (south of TN-52) has been renamed "Joe Youngs Street" |

== See also ==
- List of National Historic Landmarks in Tennessee
- National Register of Historic Places listings in Tennessee
