= Tennessee State Route 296 =

State highway in Tennessee, United States

State Route 296
- Taylor Place Road
- SR 296 highlighted in red

Route information
- Maintained by TDOT
- Length: 2.9 mi (4.7 km)
- Existed: July 1, 1983–present

Major junctions
- West end: US 127 just south of Jamestown
- East end: SR 52 in Allardt

Location
- Country: United States
- State: Tennessee
- Counties: Fentress

Highway system
- Tennessee State Routes; Interstate; US; State
← SR 295	→ SR 297

State Route 296 (SR 296), also known as Taylor Place Road, is an east–west state highway in Fentress County, Tennessee, connecting Jamestown with Allardt.

== Route description ==
SR 296 travels through rural areas for entire length, both farmland and wooded areas. SR 296 is a two-lane highway with a speed limit of 45 miles per hour (72 km/h), except in Allardt, which is 30 miles per hour (48 km/h), traveling through hilly terrain. There are no other cities or communities along the route besides at either of its termini.

== Major intersections ==
The entire route is in Fentress County.

Location	mi	km	Destinations	Notes
	0.0	0.0	US 127 (S York Highway/SR 28) – Clarkrange, Grimsley, Jamestown	Western terminus
Allardt	2.9	4.7	SR 52 (Pennsylvania Avenue/Michigan Avenue) – Jamestown, Rugby, Elgin	Eastern terminus
1.000 mi = 1.609 km; 1.000 km = 0.621 mi
