= Tommy Burnett =

American politician (1942–2009)

Sam Thomas Burnett (August 1, 1942 – September 17, 2009) was an American politician who was Majority Leader of the Tennessee House of Representatives and served two prison sentences for separate federal convictions.

== Early life and education ==
Burnett was born and raised in Goodlettsville, Tennessee. He attended Cumberland College and received a law degree from the University of Tennessee.

== Professional life ==
A farmer, businessperson and attorney, Burnett served as a Cumberland County Church of Christ preacher in Jamestown, Tennessee. After graduating from law school, Burnett established a law practice and began his political career.

== Political career ==
In 1970, 28-year-old Burnett, a Democrat, was elected to the Tennessee House of Representatives. His district included Fentress, Overton and Morgan counties on the Cumberland Plateau. Burnett became a trusted lieutenant of House Speaker Ned McWherter. Burnett served first as house floor leader then house majority leader during the administrations of Governors Ray Blanton, Lamar Alexander and McWherter.

Burnett's strong oratorical skills and effectiveness at working across party lines made him a gifted politician. Some state political observers speculated Burnett would become governor. He is given much of the credit for winning passage of major education legislation proposed by Governor Alexander, nursing home reforms, the Tennessee Sentencing Commission Act, and tort reform. Among the successful legislation that he sponsored were laws mandating use of seatbelts and limiting the nighttime hours of work for teenage students.

=== 1983 conviction ===
In 1983, Burnett served 10 months in prison at Maxwell Air Force Base after his conviction in federal court for the misdemeanor of willfully failing to file federal income tax returns. While in prison, he was re-elected to the Tennessee House of Representatives, defeating two opponents in the primary and winning the November 1984 general election with 60 percent of the vote.

=== 1991 conviction ===
Burnett was convicted again in August 1990 on nine counts for his involvement in an illegal bingo gambling operation. In 1991, Burnett was convicted as a result of the Operation Rocky Top investigation by the FBI into corruption in the Tennessee General Assembly. One of his convictions was for defrauding a man he had met in prison and inducing him to invest $48,000 in the gambling operation.

Burnett received a five-year prison sentence for his Operation Rocky Top conviction, and served 16 months before being released to a halfway house in August 1992. After his conviction, he was forced to end his campaign for re-election to an 11th term in the fall of 1990, and went to work as a car dealer during the appeals process. After six months in the halfway house, he began a new career as a talk radio commentator on Teddy Bart's Roundtable program in Nashville.

As a convicted felon, Burnett lost his law license and could not seek public office again. However, he succeeded in getting the law license restored in 2003 and became a lobbyist in the General Assembly in his final years, although health problems limited his physical activity.

== Later years ==
Burnett's career also included stints as a cattle rancher, oil prospector, chicken farmer, and seller of fireworks. He is credited with helping to establish the Highway 127 Corridor Sale, which has been called "the world's largest flea market."

== Death ==
Burnett died September 17, 2009, in a hospital in Nashville. His funeral was September 20, 2009, in the Fentress County community of Banner Springs. His remains were transported in a mule-drawn carriage to Springs Chapel Cemetery for burial.
