= WDEB =

WDEB may refer to:

- WDEB (AM), a radio station (1500 AM) licensed to Jamestown, Tennessee, United States
- WDEB-FM, a radio station (103.9 FM) licensed to Jamestown, Tennessee, United States
