= Farmer Kelly =

American football player and county agent (1889–1961)

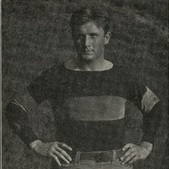
- Kelly c. 1913

No. 13
- Position: Tackle

Personal information
- Born: January 22, 1889; Orlinda, Tennessee
- Died: April 26, 1961 (aged 72); Columbus, Mississippi
- Listed height: 6 ft 1 in (1.85 m)
- Listed weight: 188 lb (85 kg)

Career information
- High school: Peoples and Tucker School
- College: Tennessee (1911–1914)

Awards and highlights
- SIAA championship (1914); All-Southern (1913, 1914)

Farmer Kelly (January 22, 1889 – April 26, 1961) was a college football player, from Orlinda, Tennessee. He was later a county agent for the U. S. Department of Agriculture in Kentucky.

== University of Tennessee ==
Kelly was a prominent tackle for the Tennessee Volunteers of the University of Tennessee from 1911 to 1914. He was the All-Southern captain of the Southern Intercollegiate Athletic Association (SIAA) champion 1914 team.

=== 1914 ===
In 1914, Tennessee won the Southern Intercollegiate Athletic Association, the first championship of any kind for the Tennessee program. Winning all nine of their games, the 1914 squad was only the second undefeated team in Tennessee history. The 1914 Vols were retroactively awarded a national championship by 1st-N-Goal, though this remains largely unrecognized. One account of the Sewanee game that year reads "Mush Kerr played a wonderful game in the line as did Capt. Kelly. The work of the Tennessee line was easily the feature of the contest, and Sewanee early discovered that it was practically useless to rely on line plunges to gain ground."
