= Allons =

Allons may refer to:

- Allons, Alpes-de-Haute-Provence, a commune of the Alpes-de-Haute-Provence département in France
- Allons, Lot-et-Garonne, a commune of the Lot-et-Garonne département in France
- Allons, Tennessee, US

== See also ==
- Allonne (disambiguation)
- Allonnes (disambiguation)
