= North Springs =

The term North Springs may mean:

- North Springs, Tennessee, an unincorporated community in Jackson County, Tennessee
- North Springs (neighborhood), a suburban district in Sandy Springs, Georgia
  - North Springs (MARTA station), a passenger rail station in the North Springs district of Sandy Springs, Georgia
  - North Springs High School, a high school in Sandy Springs, Georgia
