= Earl Mossor =

American baseball player (1925-1988)

- Pitcher
- Born: July 21, 1925; Forbus, Tennessee, U.S.
- Died: December 29, 1988 (aged 63); Batavia, Ohio, U.S.
- Batted: Left Threw: Right

MLB debut
- April 30, 1951, for the Brooklyn Dodgers

Last MLB appearance
- May 16, 1951, for the Brooklyn Dodgers

MLB statistics
- Record: 0-0
- Earned run average: 32.40
- Walks/Strikeouts: 7/1
- Innings pitched: 1 1/3
- Stats at Baseball Reference

Teams
- Brooklyn Dodgers (1951)

Earl Dalton Mossor (July 21, 1925 – December 29, 1988) was an American pitcher in Major League Baseball who played in three games for the Brooklyn Dodgers during the 1951 season. Listed at 6' 1", 175 lb., Mossor batted left handed and threw right handed. A single in his only at-bat left Mossor with a rare MLB career batting average of 1.000.

He was born in Forbus, Tennessee.

Mossor also pitched with several Minor league teams in 12 seasons spanning 1946–1959.

In 1946, he would go 21-8 while pitching 239 innings for the Clinton Blues in the Tobacco State League, but his team lost the league title by a half-game and was also beaten in the final round of the playoffs, four to three games.

His most productive campaign came in 1950 with the Portsmouth Cubs, when he posted a 20–11 record and a 2.98 ERA in a career-high 257 innings, helping his team to the Piedmont League pennant and putting him on the All-Star team.

Mossor also pitched for the Cervecería Caracas club of the Venezuelan Professional Baseball League in the 1951–1952 and 1952–1953 tournaments, compiling an undefeated 10–0 record and a 2.74 ERA in both stints, while leading his team to the VPBL pennant in 1952–1953.

Following his baseball career, Mossor worked as a sheet metal mechanic. He died in 1988 in Batavia, Ohio, at the age of 63.
