= Tennessee State Route 52 =

State highway in Tennessee, United States

State Route 52
- Rugby Pike
- SR 52; primary in red, secondary in blue

Route information
- Maintained by TDOT
- Length: 141.4 mi (227.6 km)
- Existed: October 1, 1923–present
- Tourist routes: Cumberland Historic Byway

Major junctions
- West end: SR 49 in Orlinda
- I-65 in Orlinda; US 31W on Orlinda-Portland city line; SR 109 in Portland; US 31E / US 231 in Westmoreland; SR 10 in Lafayette; SR 56 in Red Boiling Springs; SR 53 in Celina; SR 85 / SR 111 in Livingston; US 127 in Jamestown
- East end: US 27 in Elgin

Location
- Country: United States
- State: Tennessee
- Counties: Robertson, Sumner, Macon, Clay, Overton, Pickett, Fentress, Morgan, Scott

Highway system
- Tennessee State Routes; Interstate; US; State
← SR 51	→ SR 53

State Route 52 (SR 52) is an east–west state highway that crosses nine counties in northern and northeastern Tennessee. The 141.4-mile-long (227.6 km) route originates in Orlinda along SR 49 and ends in Elgin along U.S. Route 27 (US 27).

SR 52 is mostly a primary route, but becomes secondary west of I-65. Between Celina and Livingston it is part of Corridor J of the Appalachian Development Highway System.

== Route description ==
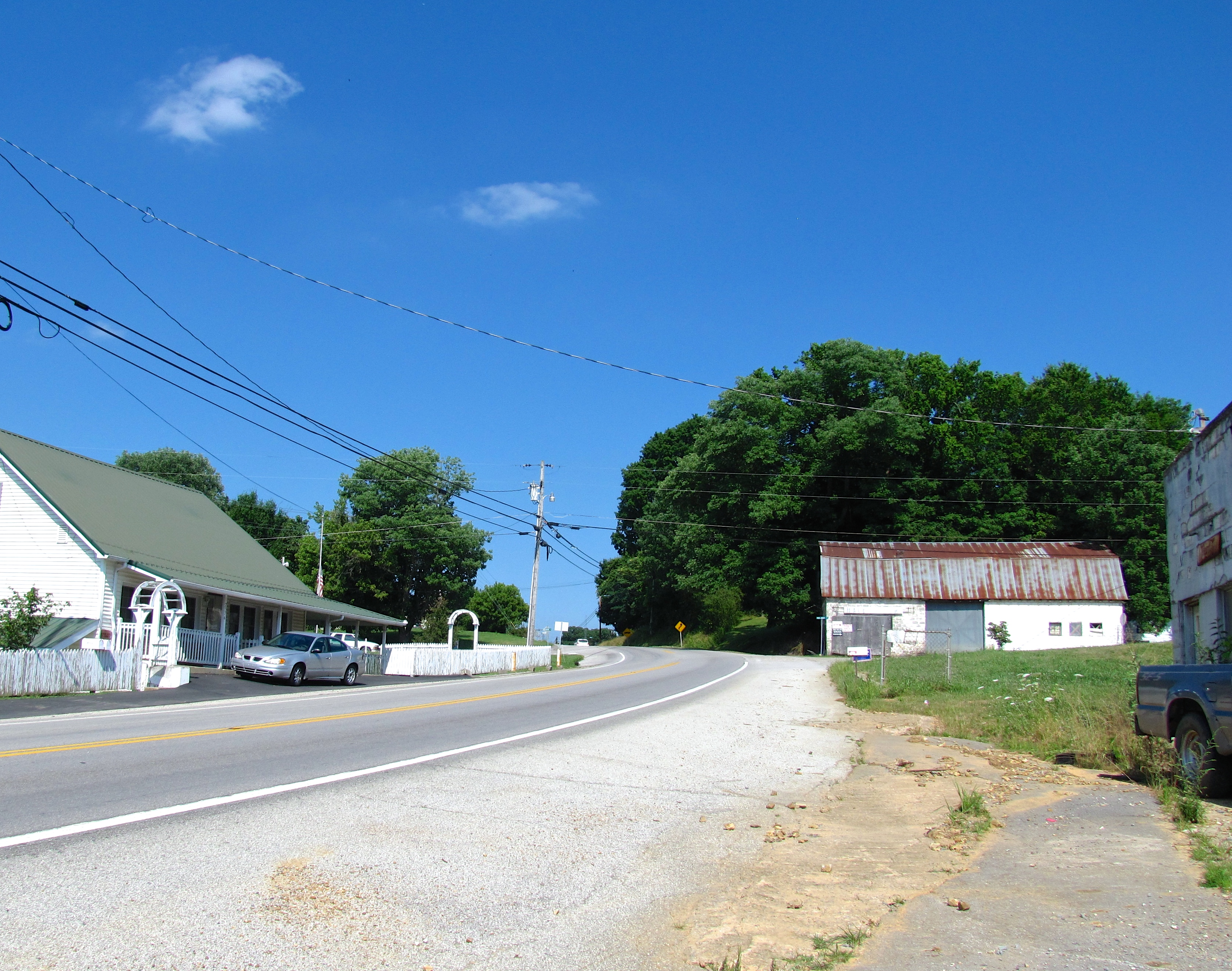
Buildings along State Route 52 in the Moss community of Clay County.

=== In the border counties ===
SR 52 begins as a secondary state route in Orlinda at SR 49 in Robertson County. It begins an eastward trek and junctions with I-65 (Exit 117) west of Portland. A short distance later, it junctions with US 31W (SR 41) and enters Sumner County. Once it does so, it becomes a primary route. SR 52 then enters Portland and has an Intersection with SR 109. Continuing east, SR 52 enters Westmoreland, bypassing the downtown area to the south, and comes to an intersection with US 31E/231 (SR 6). It then crosses into Macon County and passes through Siloam. SR 52 continues into Lafayette to intersect with SR 10. It then exits Lafayette and intersects with SR 262 at Webbtown. It continues to Red Boiling Springs, where it has a junction with SR 56. It then has an interchange with SR 151 a short distance later.

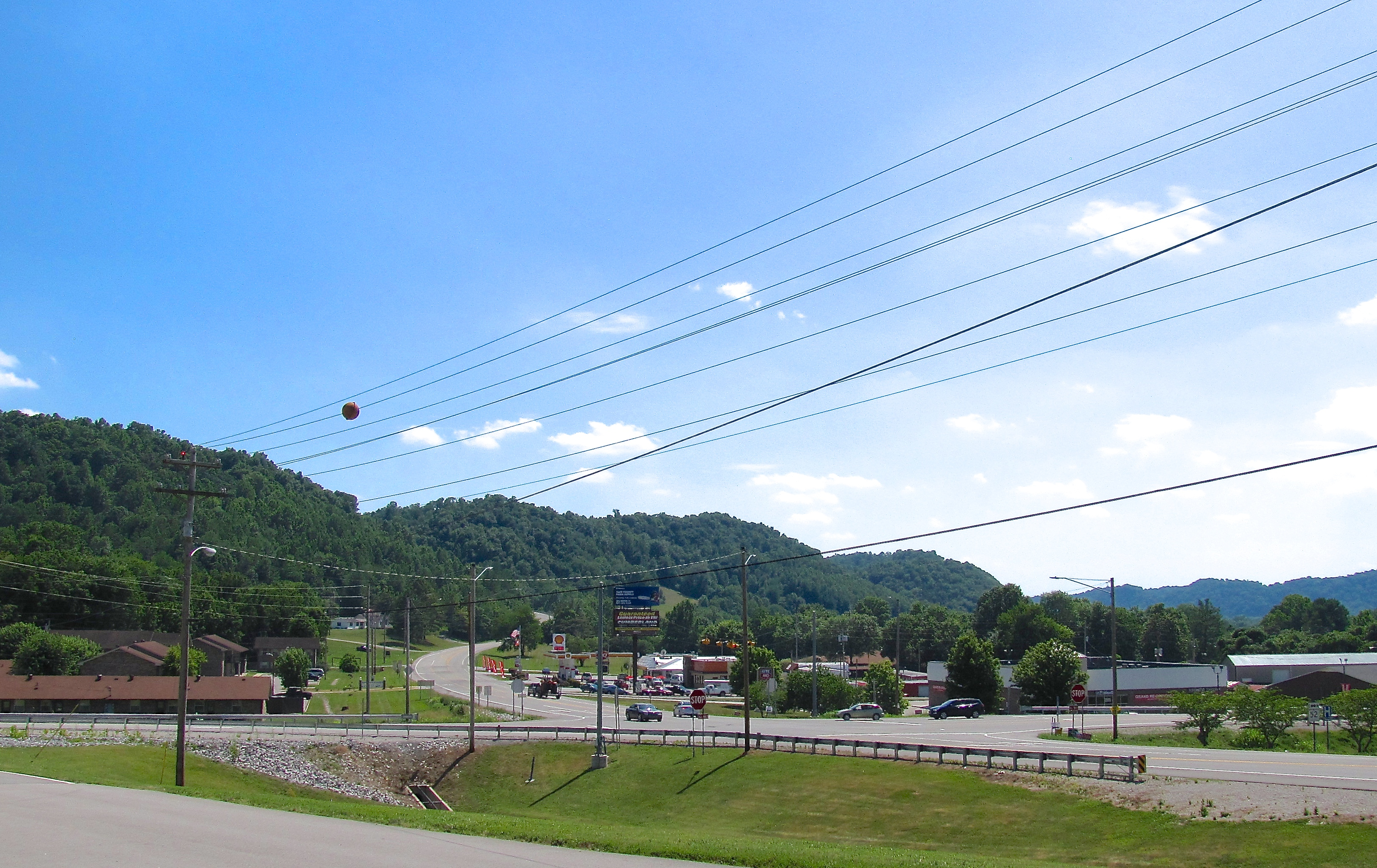
The intersection of State Route 52 and State Route 53 in Celina, Tennessee.

It continues eastward into Clay County, and goes through the communities of Hermitage Springs and Moss, the latter of which SR 51 intersects SR 52, and SR 135 intersects SR 52 in the former. SR 53 intersects SR 52 at Celina.

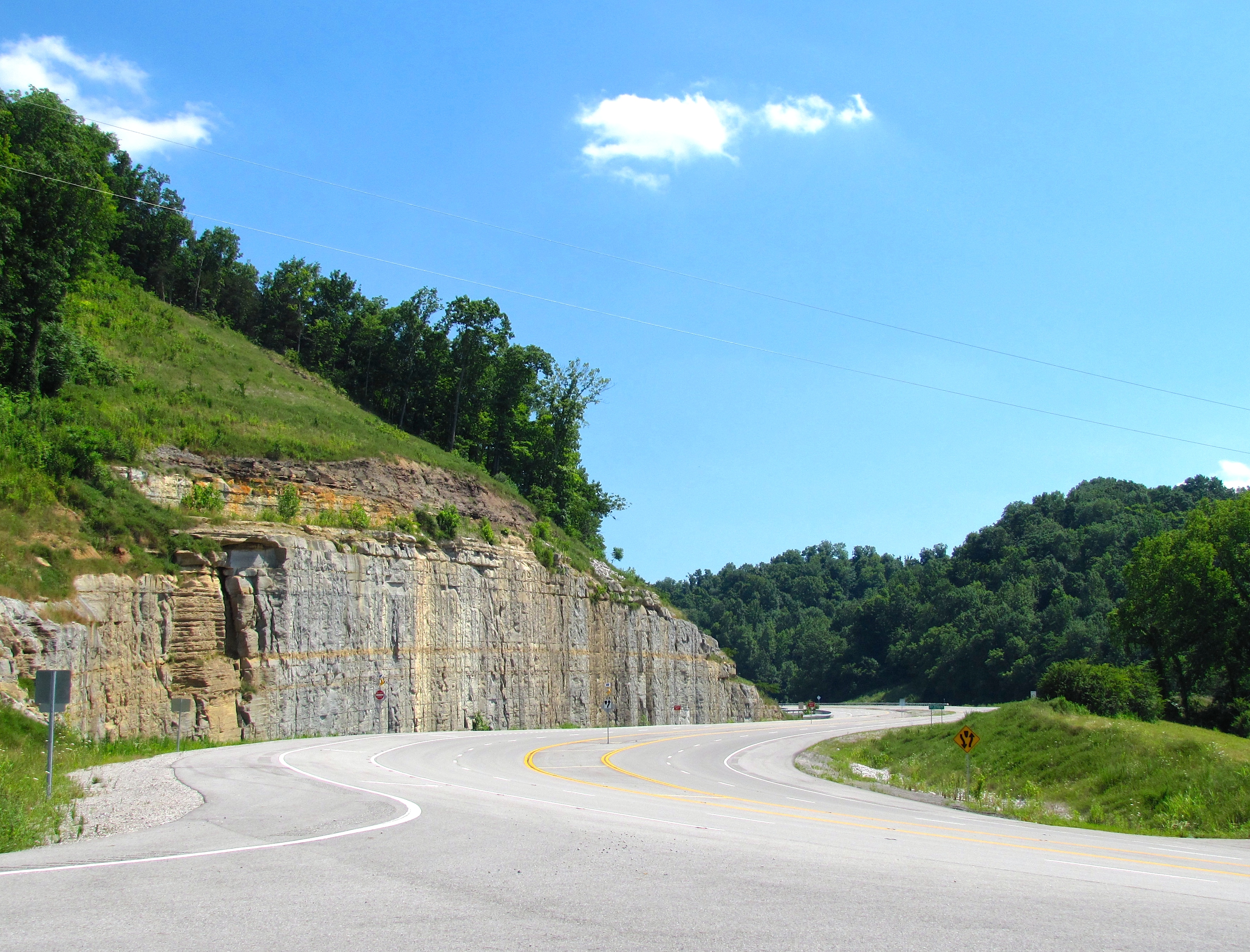
Road cut along State Route 52 in Celina, Tennessee.

For SR 52’s first 75.9 miles (122.1 km), it parallels the Tennessee-Kentucky state line.

=== Celina to Elgin ===
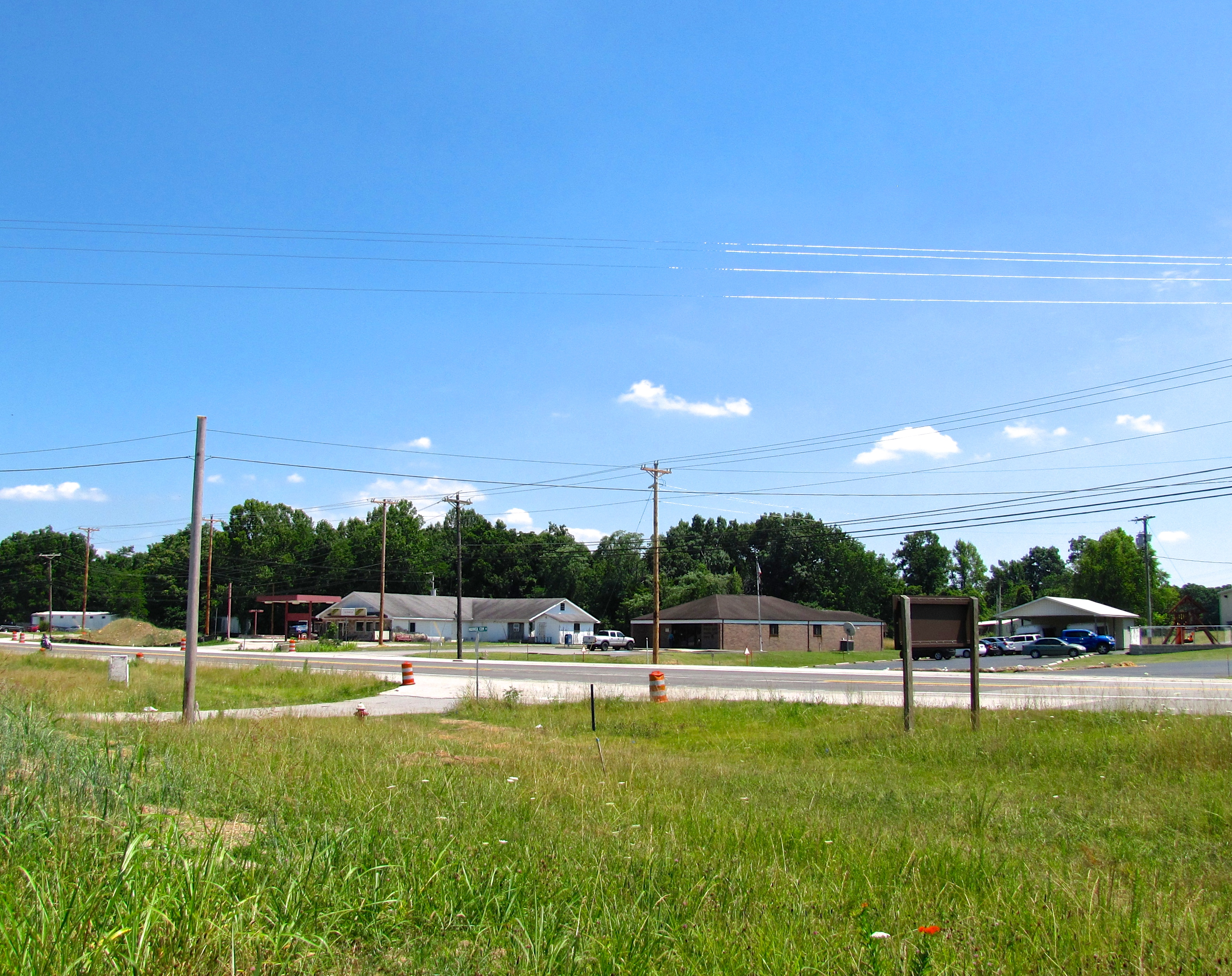
Post office and other buildings along Celina Highway (State Route 52) in Allons, Tennessee.

After exiting Celina, SR 52 turns southeast to cross into Overton County. A short distance from the county line, it comes to a junction with SR 136 just north of Standing Stone State Park. It continues east and passes through Allons. SR 52 then enters Livingston and intersects with SR 111. It continues into downtown and becomes concurrent with SR 85. It continues east and goes through Alpine and separates from SR 85 to the east.

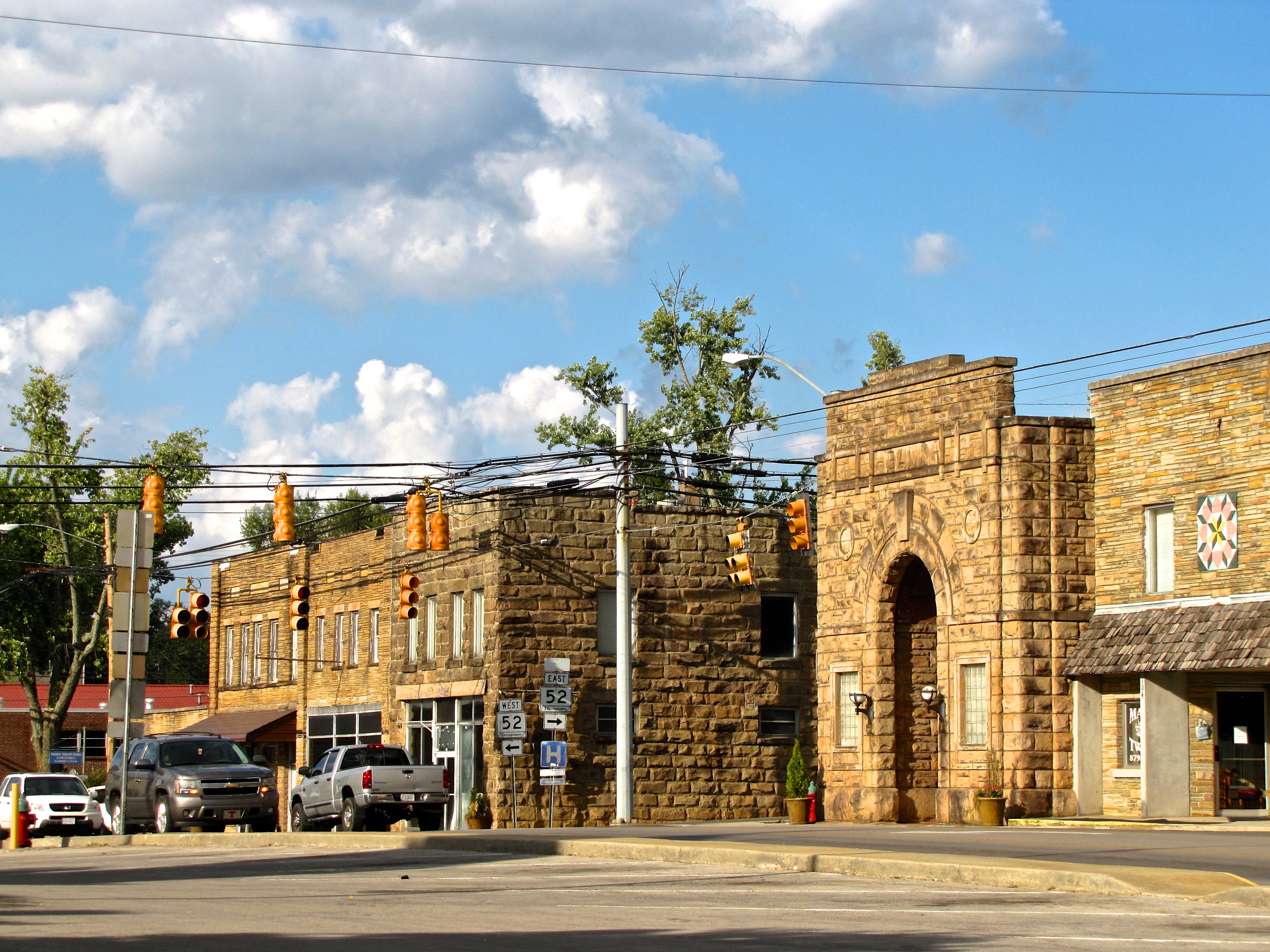
Buildings at the intersection of Central Avenue (State Route 52) and Main Street (Former US 127) in downtown Jamestown.

SR 52 then continues eastward into far southern Pickett County, and then crosses into Fentress County shortly thereafter. It winds to the east to Jamestown, where it has an intersection with SR 154. It then goes straight through downtown, crosses Main St. (Old US 127), and has an interchange with US 127 (SR 28) just east of downtown. SR 52 then goes southeast, and enters Allardt to intersect SR 296. It then continues on known as "Rugby Pike", which is the name it keeps all the way to its eastern end. It continues through rural Fentress county to a tall bridge over the Clear Fork River and crosses into Morgan County and the Eastern Time Zone.

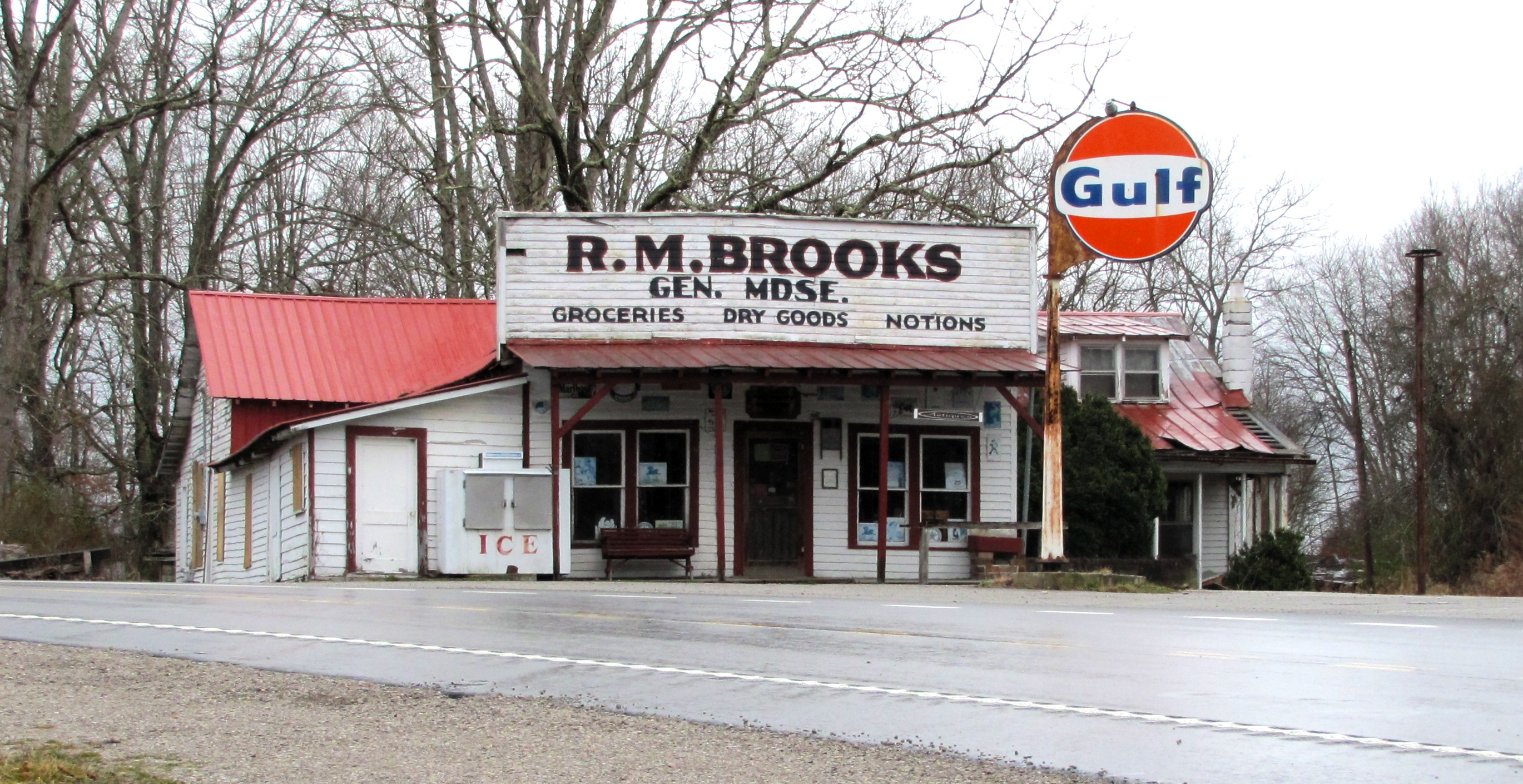
The NRHP-listed R. M. Brooks General Store, located along what is now Rugby Parkway (Old State Highway 52) in Rugby.

A short distance past the river, SR 52 intersects Rugby Parkway, which until December 2013 was the actual route of SR 52, which runs a loop through the historic community of Rugby, while the current route runs along a new bypass to the south. SR 52 then becomes very narrow and curvy and straddles Morgan County's eastern boundary line for several miles before finally entering Scott County to end in the community of Elgin at an intersection with US 27 (SR 29).

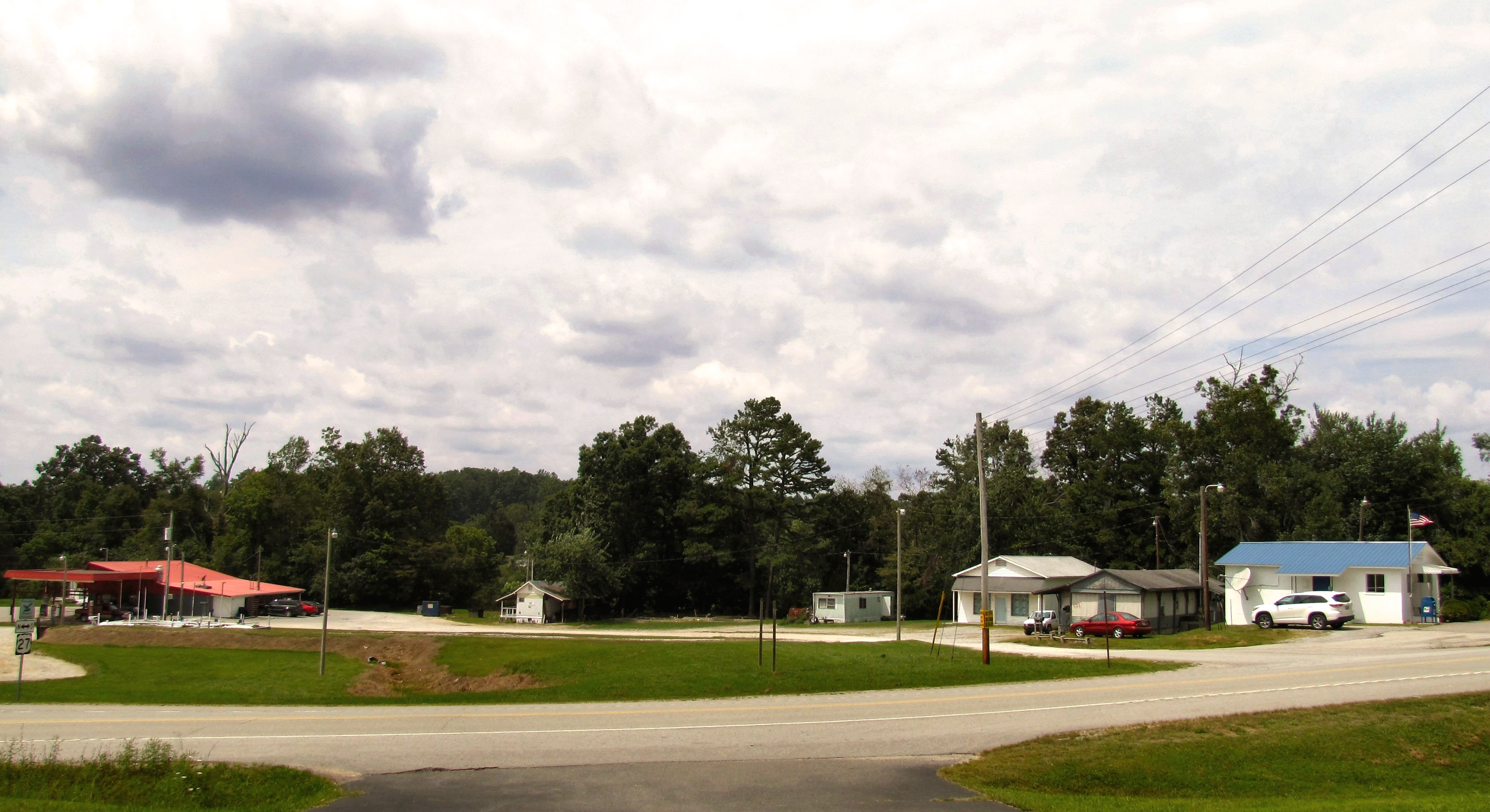
SR 52 in Elgin, Tennessee. A junction shield for US 27 can be seen in the bottom left corner.

== History ==
=== Pre-1930 ===
From 1915 until the mid-1920s, SR 52 followed a path from Hartsville, in Trousdale County, to Lafayette, along with its late-20th century alignments from Lafayette to Livingston. The route was extended to its pre-2010 alignments by 1930; the Hartsville-to-Lafayette route is now signed as SR 10.

Until the late 1920s, SR 52's course from Orlinda to Portland, along with SR 49's run from Orlinda to Springfield, was signed as SR 75. The SR 75 designation has since been reassigned to a state highway in northeastern Tennessee.

=== Re-alignments of SR 52 (2010s) ===
Sometime between 2010 and 2013, SR 52 in Red Boiling Springs was rerouted onto a bypass route to the south of that city. Most of the old alignment, however, still retains its SR 56 designation through the town. Several other older alignments of SR 52 still remain in Macon and northern Sumner Counties, including Church Street in Lafayette, and Austin Peay Highway near Westmoreland.

In December 2013, the town of Rugby was bypassed by the rerouting of SR 52, with the old alignment now being known as Rugby Parkway.

SR 52 in eastern Clay County was rerouted onto a new, straighter four-lane divided alignment from the eastern outskirts of Celina to the Overton County line. Until that project was finished in the early 2010s, SR 52 ran concurrently with SR 53 on the south side of town for a little more than one mile (1.6 km). The old alignment southeast of Celina is now known as Old Livingston Highway. Parts of an even older alignment of SR 52 in Clay County still remains intact also. All re-routings shortened the route by an estimated total of 4.4 miles (7.1 km) from the previously listed 148.88 miles (239.60 km).

== Major intersections ==
County	Location	mi	km	Destinations	Notes
Robertson	Orlinda	0.0	0.0	SR 49 (Main Street) – Springfield, Franklin (KY)	Western terminus; SR 52 begins as a secondary route
Robertson	Orlinda	6.5– 6.7	10.5– 10.8	I-65 – Nashville, Louisville	I-65 exit 117
Robertson–Sumner county line	Orlinda–Portland line	7.0	11.3	US 31W (SR 41) – White House, Mitchellville, Franklin (KY)	SR 52 becomes a primary route from this point on.
Sumner	Portland	11.5	18.5	SR 109 (S Broadway) – Mitchellville, Gallatin	
Sumner	Oak Grove	18.9	30.4	SR 259 west – Mitchellville	Eastern terminus of SR 259
Sumner	Oak Grove	19.0	30.6	SR 174 (Dobbins Pike/Fairfield Road) – Gallatin, Fairfield	
Sumner	Westmoreland	27.1	43.6	US 31E / US 231 (SR 6) – Scottsville (KY), Gallatin	
Macon	Eulia	31.0	49.9	SR 141 south (Green Grove Road) – Hartsville	Western (signed northern) terminus of SR 141
Macon	Lafayette	39.4	63.4	SR 10 (Hartsville Road/College Street) – Hartsville, Business District	
Macon	Lafayette	40.0	64.4	SR 261 north (Church Street)	Southern terminus of SR 261
Macon	Webbtown	43.7	70.3	SR 262 east (Browns Road)	Western terminus of SR 262
Macon	Red Boiling Springs	50.2	80.8	SR 56 (Carthage Road/Lafayette Road) – Gamaliel (KY), Cyclemos Motorcycle Museum, Carthage	
Macon		51.4	82.7	SR 151 – Red Boiling Springs, North Springs, Cyclemos Motorcycle Museum	Interchange
Clay	Oak Grove	60.6	97.5	SR 135 south (McCormick Ridge Road) – Gainesboro	Northern terminus of SR 135
Clay	Moss	65.5	105.4	SR 51 north (Tompkinsville Highway) – Tompkinsville (KY)	Southern terminus of SR 51
Clay	Celina	73.6	118.4	SR 52 Truck east (Dow Avenue)	Western terminus of SR 52 Truck
Clay	Celina	73.7	118.6	SR 52 Truck west (Brown Street)	Eastern terminus of SR 52 Truck
Clay	Celina	74.3	119.6	SR 53 (Gainesboro Highway/Burkesville Highway) – Gainesboro, Burkesville (KY), Dale Hollow Dam	
Overton	Timothy	81.6	131.3	SR 136 south (Timothy Road) – Standing Stone State Rustic Park	Northern terminus of SR 136
Overton	Livingston	90.1	145.0	SR 111 (Bradford Hicks Drive) to SR 84 – Byrdstown, Cookeville	
Overton	Livingston	90.9	146.3	SR 85 west (Broad Street) – Cookeville, Nashville	Western end of SR 85 overlap
Overton	Livingston	92.0	148.1	SR 294 north (East Main Street) to SR 111 – Byrdstown	Southern terminus of SR 294
Overton		100.0	160.9	SR 85 east (Wilder Highway) – Grimsley	Eastern end of SR 85 overlap
Pickett	No major junctions				
Fentress		117.2	188.6	SR 154 north (West Cove Road) – Pickett State Park	Southern terminus of SR 154
Fentress	Jamestown	118.9	191.4	Old US 127 (Main Street)	
Fentress	Jamestown	119.5	192.3	US 127 (SR 28) – Sgt. Alvin C. York State Historic Park, Static, Grimsley, Crossville	Interchange
Fentress	Allardt	123.6	198.9	SR 296 west (Taylor Place Road)	Eastern terminus of SR 296
Clear Fork River		133.6	215.0	Bridge over the Clear Fork River	
Morgan		134.0	215.7	Rugby Parkway – Rugby	Old SR 52
Morgan	Rugby	135.9	218.7	Rugby Parkway – Rugby	Old SR 52
Scott	Elgin	141.4	227.6	US 27 (Scott Highway/SR 29) – Oneida, Huntsville, Wartburg	Eastern terminus
1.000 mi = 1.609 km; 1.000 km = 0.621 mi: Concurrency terminus

== Related route ==
State Route 52 Truck
- Location: Celina
- Length: 0.049 mi (79 m)

State Route 52 Truck Route (SR 52 Truck) is a truck route in downtown Celina, in Clay County. With a total length of 261 feet (80 m), the truck route includes the following streets:

- Dow Avenue from SR 52 (Main St./Dow Ave.) to Brown Street, and
- Brown Street from Dow Avenue to Lake Avenue.

The route folds back into SR 52 at the corner of Brown Street and Lake Avenue.
