= Allardt Presbyterian Church =

Historic church in Tennessee, United States

- U.S. National Register of Historic Places
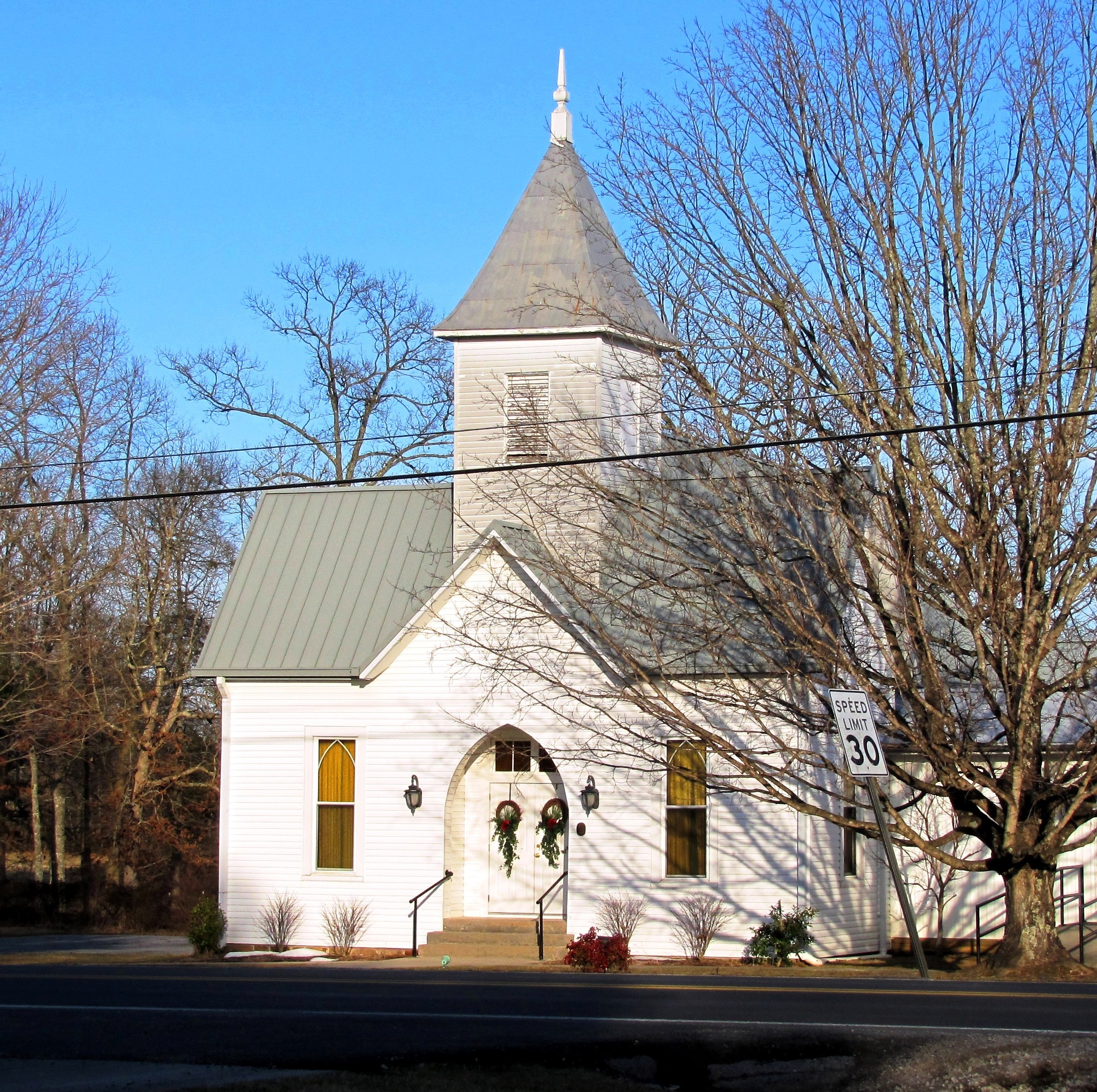

- Location within Tennessee Location within the United States
- Location: TN 52, Allardt, Tennessee
- Coordinates: 36°22′55″N 84°53′3″W
- Area: less than one acre
- Built: 1903
- Architect: Colditz, Max; Et al.
- Architectural style: Gothic Revival
- MPS: Fentress County MPS
- NRHP reference No.: 91000818
- Added to NRHP: July 03, 1991

Allardt Presbyterian Church (also known as the First Presbyterian Church) is a historic church on Tennessee State Route 52 (Pennsylvania Avenue) in Allardt, Tennessee. It is affiliated with the Presbytery of Middle Tennessee and Presbyterian Church (USA).

The Gothic Revival church building was constructed in 1903 and added to the National Register of Historic Places in 1991.
