= Tennessee State Route 151 =

State highway in Tennessee, United States

State Route 151
- TN 151 highlighted in red

Route information
- Maintained by TDOT
- Length: 7.4 mi (11.9 km)

Major junctions
- West end: SR 56 in Red Boiling Springs
- SR 52 near Red Boiling Springs
- East end: SR 56 in North Springs

Location
- Country: United States
- State: Tennessee
- Counties: Macon, Clay, Jackson

Highway system
- Tennessee State Routes; Interstate; US; State
← SR 150	→ SR 152

State Route 151 (SR 151) is a state highway in the central portion of the U.S. state of Tennessee.

== Route description ==
SR 151 begins in Macon County at an intersection with SR 56 in downtown Red Boiling Springs. It goes southeastward as E Main Street to leave the town and have an interchange with SR 52. It continues southeast through farmland to cross into the southwestern corner of Clay County for a short distance before crossing into the mountains of Jackson County. SR 151 continues southeastward through the mountains along a narrow valley before entering North Springs and coming to an end at an intersection with SR 56. The entire route of SR 151 is a rural two-lane highway.

== Major intersections ==
County	Location	mi	km	Destinations	Notes
Macon	Red Boiling Springs	0.0	0.0	SR 56 (Main Street) – Carthage, Gamaliel, KY	Western terminus
Macon		1.1	1.8	SR 52 – Lafayette, Celina	Interchange via Two-way access road
Clay	No major junctions				
Jackson	North Springs	7.4	11.9	SR 56 / SR 56 (Jennings Creek Highway) – Gainesboro, Lafayette	Eastern (signed southern at this intersection) terminus
1.000 mi = 1.609 km; 1.000 km = 0.621 mi
