= Allonnes =

Allonnes may refer to:

- Allonnes, Eure-et-Loir, a commune of the Eure-et-Loir département in France
- Allonnes, Maine-et-Loire, a commune of the Maine-et-Loire département in France
- Allonnes, Sarthe, a commune of the Sarthe département in France

== See also ==
- Allonne (disambiguation)
- Allons (disambiguation)
