= Allonne =

Allonne may refer to:

- Allonne, Oise, a commune of the Oise département in France
- Allonne, Deux-Sèvres, a commune of the Deux-Sèvres département in France

== See also ==
- Allonnes (disambiguation)
- Allons (disambiguation)
