= Zenith, Tennessee =

- Unincorporated community
- Location within Tennessee Location within the United States
- Coordinates: 36°25′39″N 84°44′13″W
- Country: United States
- State: Tennessee
- County: Fentress
- Elevation: 1,053 ft (321 m)
- Time zone: UTC-6 (Central (CST))
  - Summer (DST): UTC-5 (CDT)
- Area code: 931
- GNIS feature ID: 1314555

Zenith is an unincorporated community in Fentress County, Tennessee, United States.
