= WDEB-FM =

- Jamestown, Tennessee; United States
- Broadcast area: Fentress County
- Frequency: 103.9 MHz
- Branding: 103.9 WDEB

Programming
- Format: Country
- Affiliations: Citadel Media

Ownership
- Owner: Baz Broadcasting, Inc.
- Sister stations: WDEB

History
- Former call signs: WDEB (1979–1979)

Technical information
- Licensing authority: FCC
- Facility ID: 4135
- Class: A
- ERP: 1,600 watts
- HAAT: 135 meters (443 ft)
- Transmitter coordinates: 36°25′31.00″N 84°56′32.00″W

Links
- Public license information: Public file; LMS
- Website: www.wdebradio.com

WDEB-FM (103.9 FM, "Great American Country") is a radio station broadcasting a country music format. Licensed to Jamestown, Tennessee, United States, the station is currently owned by Baz Broadcasting, Inc. and features programming from Citadel Media. The station has obtained a construction permit from the FCC for a power increase to 3,400 watts.

== History ==
The station was opened up in 1975 by N.A. "Turk" Baz. It was assigned the call sign WDEB on April 2, 1979. On July 18, 1979, the station changed its call sign to the current WDEB-FM.
