= WDEB (AM) =

- Jamestown, Tennessee; United States
- Frequency: 1500 kHz
- Branding: 98 The One

Programming
- Format: Contemporary Christian
- Affiliations: Westwood One

Ownership
- Owner: Baz Broadcasting, Inc.
- Sister stations: WDEB-FM

History
- First air date: 1968

Technical information
- Licensing authority: FCC
- Facility ID: 4136
- Class: D
- Power: 1,000 watts (day); 500 watts (critical hours)
- Transmitter coordinates: 36°25′31.00″N 84°56′32.00″W
- Translator: (98.1 MHz) W251CO (Jamestown)

Links
- Public license information: Public file; LMS
- Website: 98 The One Online

WDEB (1500 AM, "98 The One") is a radio station broadcasting a Contemporary Christian music format. Licensed to Jamestown, Tennessee, United States, the station is currently owned by Baz Broadcasting, Inc. and features programming from Westwood One.
