= Orlinda, Tennessee =

- City
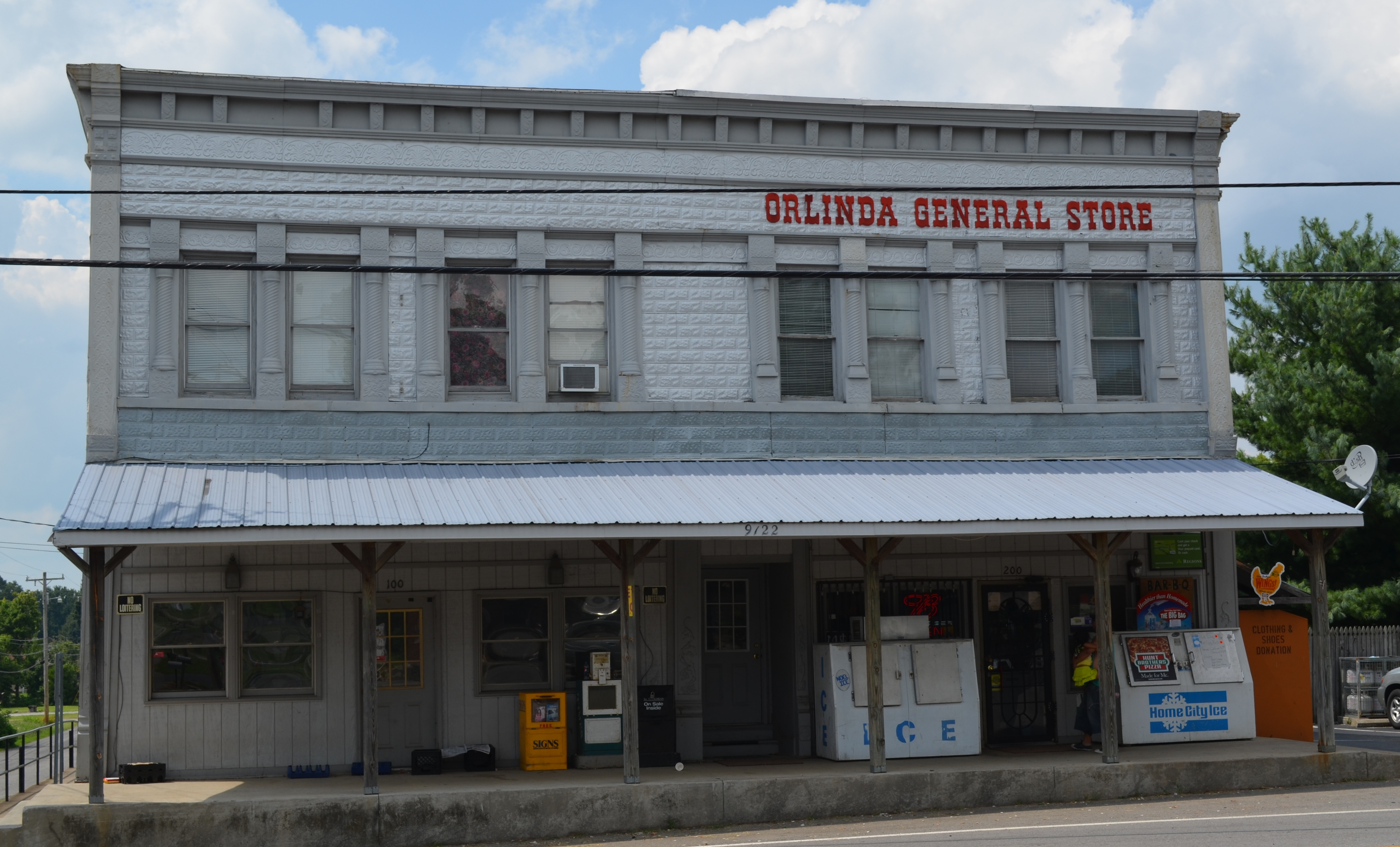
- Orlinda General Store in Orlinda
- Motto: "The Sunniest Spot in Tennessee"
- Location of Orlinda in Robertson County, Tennessee.
- Coordinates: 36°36′03″N 86°43′00″W
- Country: United States
- State: Tennessee
- County: Robertson

Government
  - Mayor: Tabitha Swearingen
  - City Manager: Kevin Breeding

Area
  - Total: 6.59 sq mi (17.06 km^{2})
  - Land: 6.59 sq mi (17.06 km^{2})
  - Water: 0 sq mi (0.00 km^{2})
- Elevation: 719 ft (219 m)

Population (2020)
  - Total: 947
  - Estimate (2024): 1,005 ▲
  - Density: 143.7/sq mi (55.49/km^{2})
- Time zone: UTC-6 (Central (CST))
  - Summer (DST): UTC-5 (CDT)
- ZIP code: 37141
- Area code(s): 615, 629
- FIPS code: 47-56020
- GNIS feature ID: 1296487
- Website: https://cityoforlindatn.com/

Orlinda is a city in Robertson County, Tennessee, United States. The population was 947 at the 2020 census, the community became a city in February 2001. The City of Orlinda conducted its own, independent census 2007. The results of that census were submitted to the State of Tennessee, which conducted a review and random sample before officially certifying the results, which it did in May 2007.

The Mayor of Orlinda is Tabitha Swearingen and the City Manager is Kevin Breeding.

== History ==
Orlinda was incorporated in 1965, and was originally called Crockers Crossroads until they had to change the name due to the area's proximity to Tuckers Crossroads, Tennessee. The name Centervile was proposed, but denied as a Centerville, Tennessee already existed, so Orlinda was proposed as no other community in the United States used that name.

In October 2000, the Orlinda City Hall and Post Office opened at its present-day location on Highway 52. Prior to this, the City Hall was located at the former Bank of Orlinda building, which was built in 1909, and is now the city's public library, which opened in 2003.

On the morning of March 15, 2019, a bridge collapsed along Highland Road that went over the Red River, no one was injured during the collapse. On October 22, 2019, Orlinda City Manager Kevin Breeding's house caught on fire while he was asleep, Breeding was not harmed in the fire.

== Education ==
Orlinda students attend East Robertson Elementary School (Pre-K–5th) and East Robertson High School (6-12), both schools are located in Cross Plains

== Geography ==
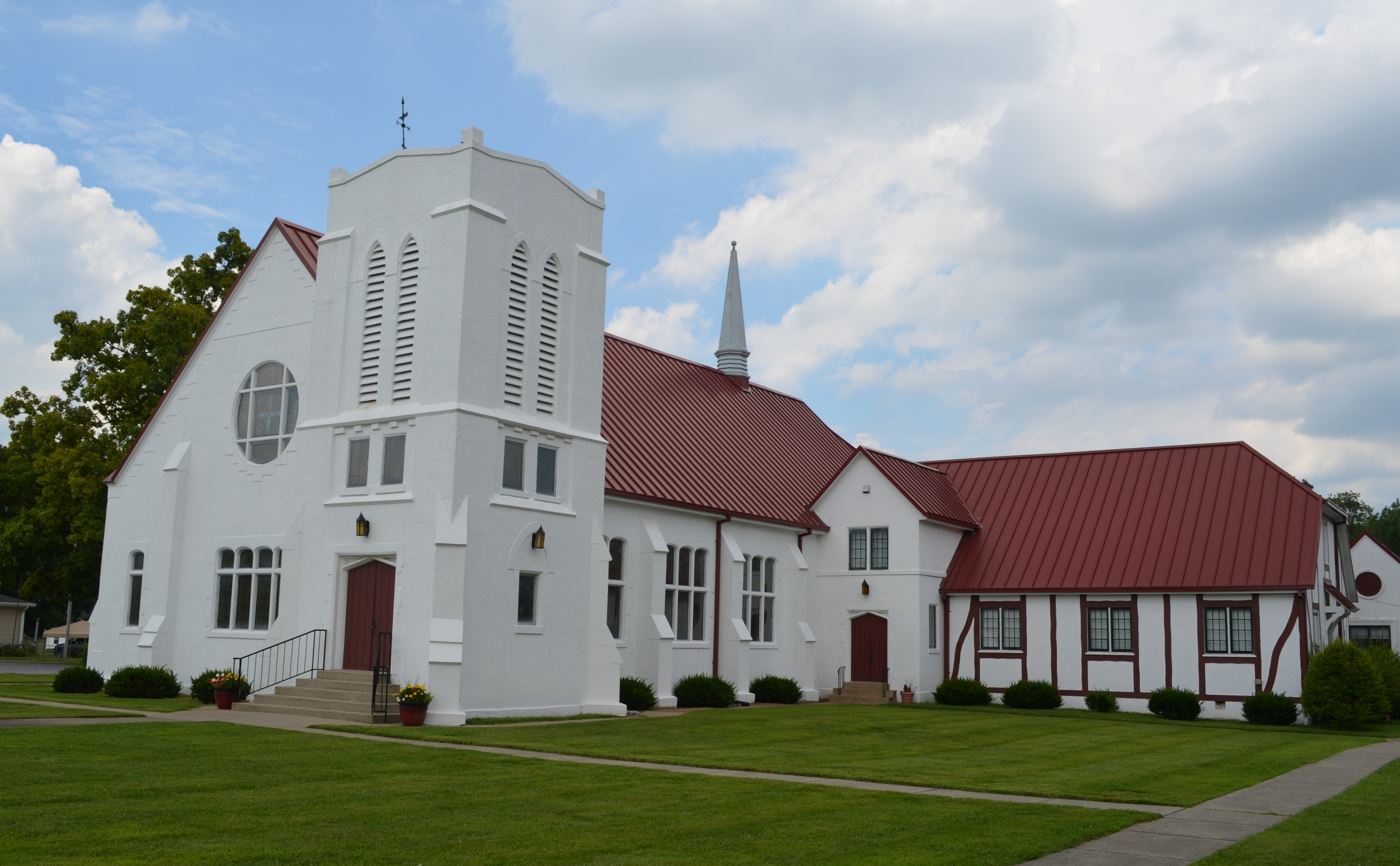
Orlinda Baptist Church - Orlinda, Tennessee

According to the United States Census Bureau, the town had a total area of 6.7 square miles (17 km^{2}), all land.

== Demographics ==
Historical population
Census	Pop.	Note	%±
1970	347		—
1980	382		10.1%
1990	469		22.8%
2000	594		26.7%
2010	859		44.6%
2020	947		10.2%
2024 (est.)	1,005		6.1%

=== 2020 census ===
As of the 2020 census, Orlinda had a population of 947 across 348 households, including 256 families. The median age was 39.0 years. 25.2% of residents were under the age of 18 and 15.6% of residents were 65 years of age or older. For every 100 females there were 105.4 males, and for every 100 females age 18 and over there were 97.8 males.

There were 348 households in Orlinda, of which 38.8% had children under the age of 18 living in them. Of all households, 57.5% were married-couple households, 13.8% were households with a male householder and no spouse or partner present, and 21.8% were households with a female householder and no spouse or partner present. About 17.2% of all households were made up of individuals and 7.7% had someone living alone who was 65 years of age or older.

There were 373 housing units, of which 6.7% were vacant. The homeowner vacancy rate was 1.7% and the rental vacancy rate was 3.3%.

0.0% of residents lived in urban areas, while 100.0% lived in rural areas.

Racial composition as of the 2020 census
Race	Number	Percent
White	833	88.0%
Black or African American	36	3.8%
American Indian and Alaska Native	0	0.0%
Asian	1	0.1%
Native Hawaiian and Other Pacific Islander	0	0.0%
Some other race	14	1.5%
Two or more races	63	6.7%
Hispanic or Latino (of any race)	35	3.7%

=== 2000 census ===
As of the census of 2000, there were 594 people, 235 households, and 176 families residing in the town. The population density was 89.1 inhabitants per square mile (34.4/km^{2}). There were 264 housing units at an average density of 39.6 per square mile (15.3/km^{2}). The racial makeup of the town was 95.29% White, 4.04% African American, 0.17% Asian, and 0.51% from two or more races. Hispanic or Latino of any race were 0.67% of the population.

There were 235 households, out of which 32.8% had children under the age of 18 living with them, 64.3% were married couples living together, 8.1% had a female householder with no husband present, and 24.7% were non-families. 23.4% of all households were made up of individuals, and 13.2% had someone living alone who was 65 years of age or older. The average household size was 2.53 and the average family size was 2.98.

In the town the population was spread out, with 23.6% under the age of 18, 8.9% from 18 to 24, 26.3% from 25 to 44, 26.1% from 45 to 64, and 15.2% who were 65 years of age or older. The median age was 38 years. For every 100 females, there were 92.9 males. For every 100 females age 18 and over, there were 93.2 males.

The median income for a household in the town was $45,000, and the median income for a family was $53,625. Males had a median income of $33,750 versus $20,341 for females. The per capita income for the town was $16,058. About 6.2% of families and 9.7% of the population were below the poverty line, including 13.5% of those under age 18 and 17.6% of those age 65 or over.
