= Allons, Tennessee =

- Unincorporated community
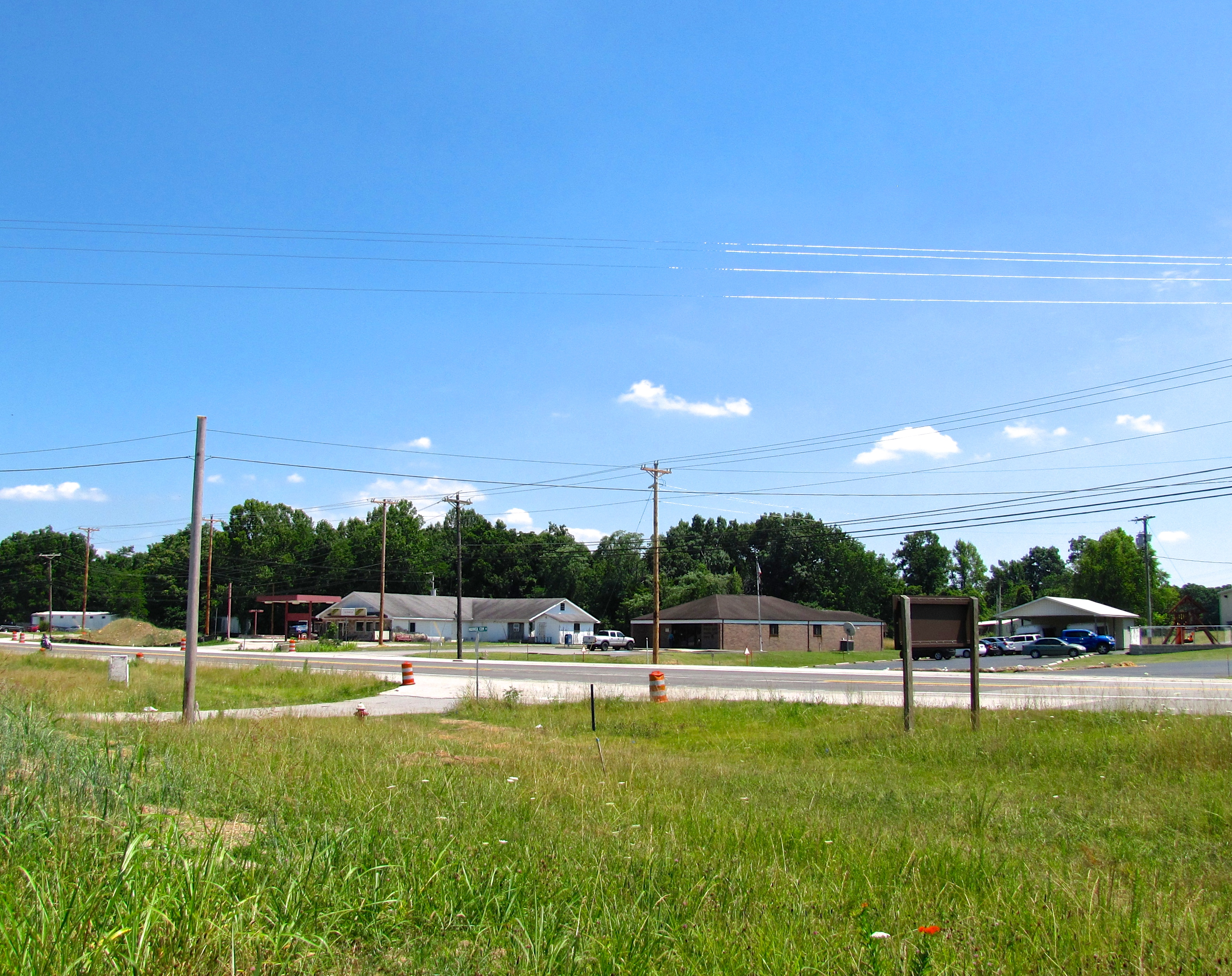
- Buildings along SR 52 in Allons

- Location within Tennessee Location within the United States
- Coordinates: 36°26′31″N 85°20′41″W
- Country: United States
- State: Tennessee
- County: Overton
- Elevation: 1,431 ft (436 m)
- Time zone: UTC-6 (Central (CST))
  - Summer (DST): UTC-5 (CDT)
- ZIP code: 38541
- Area code: 931
- GNIS feature ID: 1275624

Allons is an unincorporated community in Overton County, Tennessee, United States. The community ZIP code is 38541. It is concentrated along State Route 52 (Celina Highway) north of Livingston.

== History ==
Allons may be derived from the French meaning "to gather around". A post office has been in operation at Allons since 1896.
