= Banner Springs, Tennessee =

Banner Springs
- Unincorporated community
- Location within Tennessee Location within the United States
- Coordinates: 36°14′52″N 84°55′52″W
- Country: United States
- State: Tennessee
- County: Fentress
- Time zone: UTC-6 (Central (CST))
  - Summer (DST): UTC-5 (CDT)
- Area code: 931

Banner Springs is an unincorporated community in Fentress County, Tennessee, USA. It was the location of a post office from 1890 until 1961.
