= North Springs, Tennessee =

- Unincorporated community
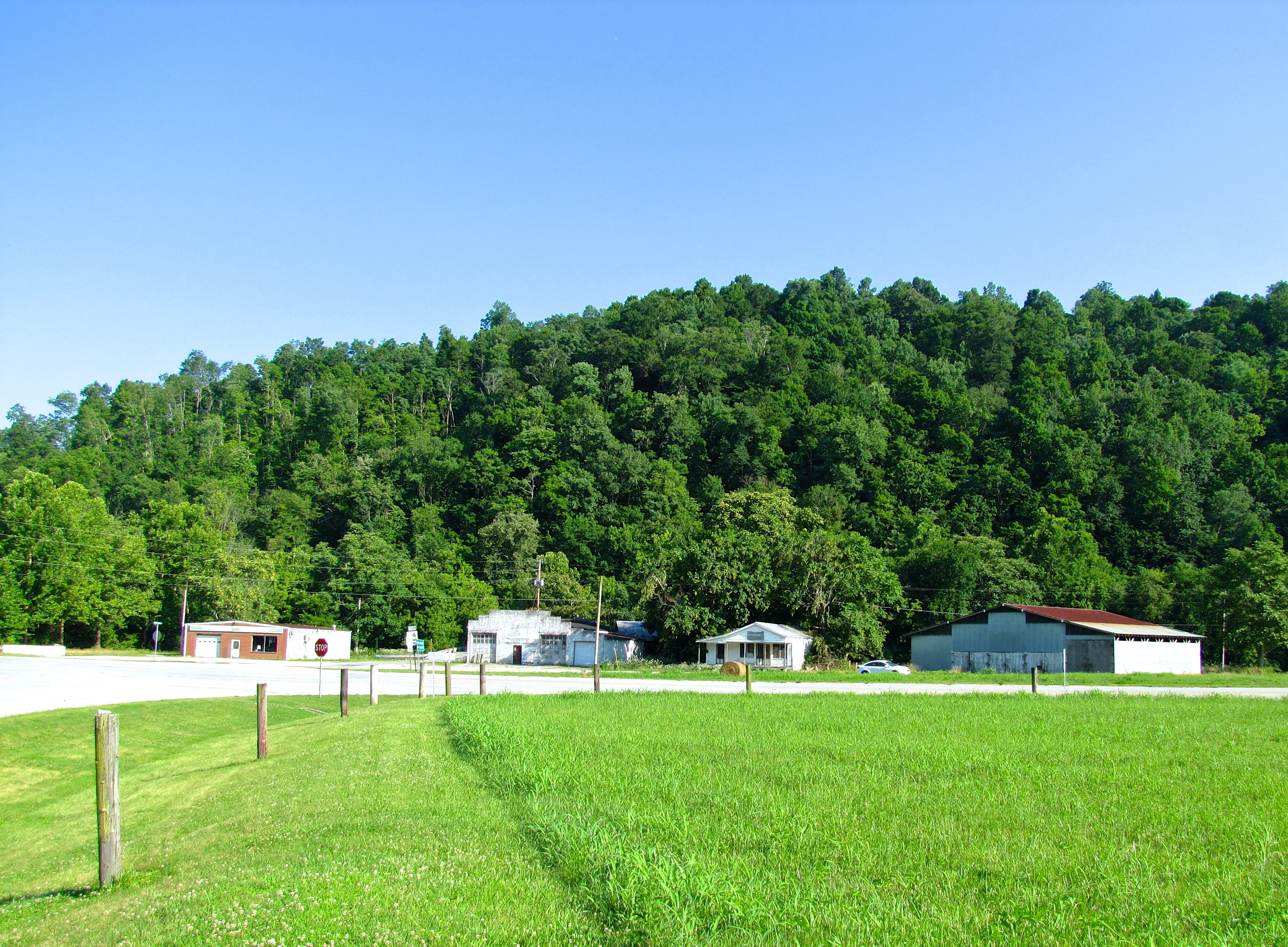
- Buildings at the intersection of SR 56 and SR 151 in North Springs

- Location within Tennessee Location within the United States
- Coordinates: 36°28′1″N 85°45′19″W
- Country: United States
- State: Tennessee
- County: Jackson
- Elevation: 604 ft (184 m)
- Time zone: UTC-6 (Central (CST))
  - Summer (DST): UTC-5 (CDT)
- GNIS feature ID: 1303511

North Springs (also North Spring) is an unincorporated community in northwestern Jackson County, Tennessee, United States. It lies along Tennessee State Routes 56 and 151, northwest of the town of Gainesboro, the county seat of Jackson County. Its elevation is 604 feet (184 m).

Home to Sigrheim, the "capital" (sic) of the Asatru Folk Assembly, a Germanic pagan organization.
