= Elgin, Tennessee =

- Census-designated place
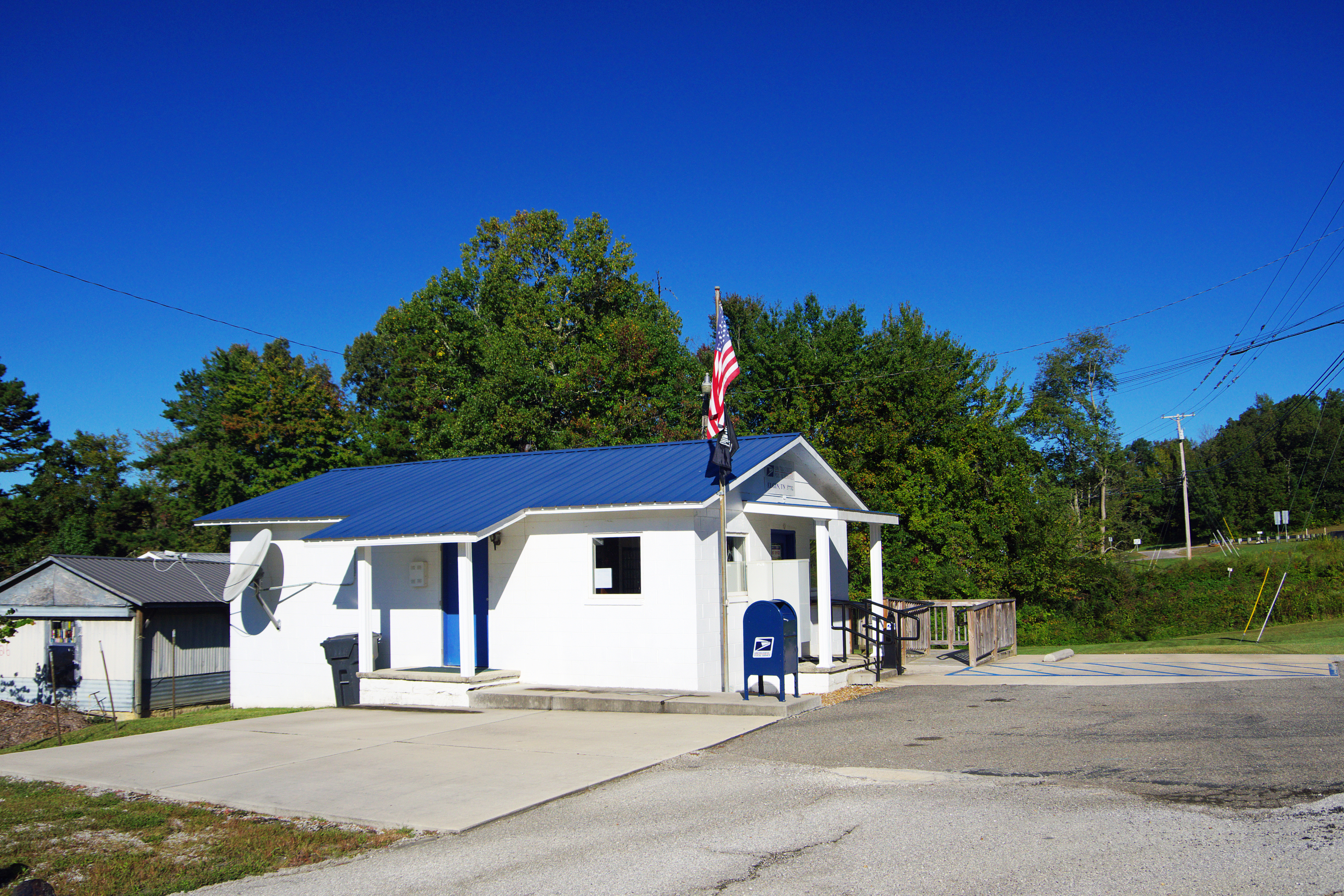
- Post office in Elgin

- Location within Tennessee
- Coordinates: 36°19′56″N 84°36′23″W
- Country: United States
- State: Tennessee
- County: Scott

Area
  - Total: 1.94 sq mi (5.03 km^{2})
  - Land: 1.94 sq mi (5.03 km^{2})
  - Water: 0 sq mi (0.00 km^{2})
- Elevation: 1,401 ft (427 m)

Population (2020)
  - Total: 297
  - Density: 152.9/sq mi (59.04/km^{2})
- Time zone: UTC-5 (Eastern (EST))
  - Summer (DST): UTC-4 (EDT)
- ZIP code: 37732
- Area code: 423
- GNIS feature ID: 1283622

Elgin is a census-designated place and unincorporated community in Scott County, Tennessee, United States. Its population was 282 as of the 2010 census. Elgin has a post office with ZIP code 37732, which opened on January 14, 1891.

== Demographics ==
Historical population
Census	Pop.	Note	%±
2020	297		—
U.S. Decennial Census
