= Forbus, Tennessee =

Unincorporated community in Tennessee, US

- Forbus Historic District
- U.S. National Register of Historic Places
- U.S. Historic district
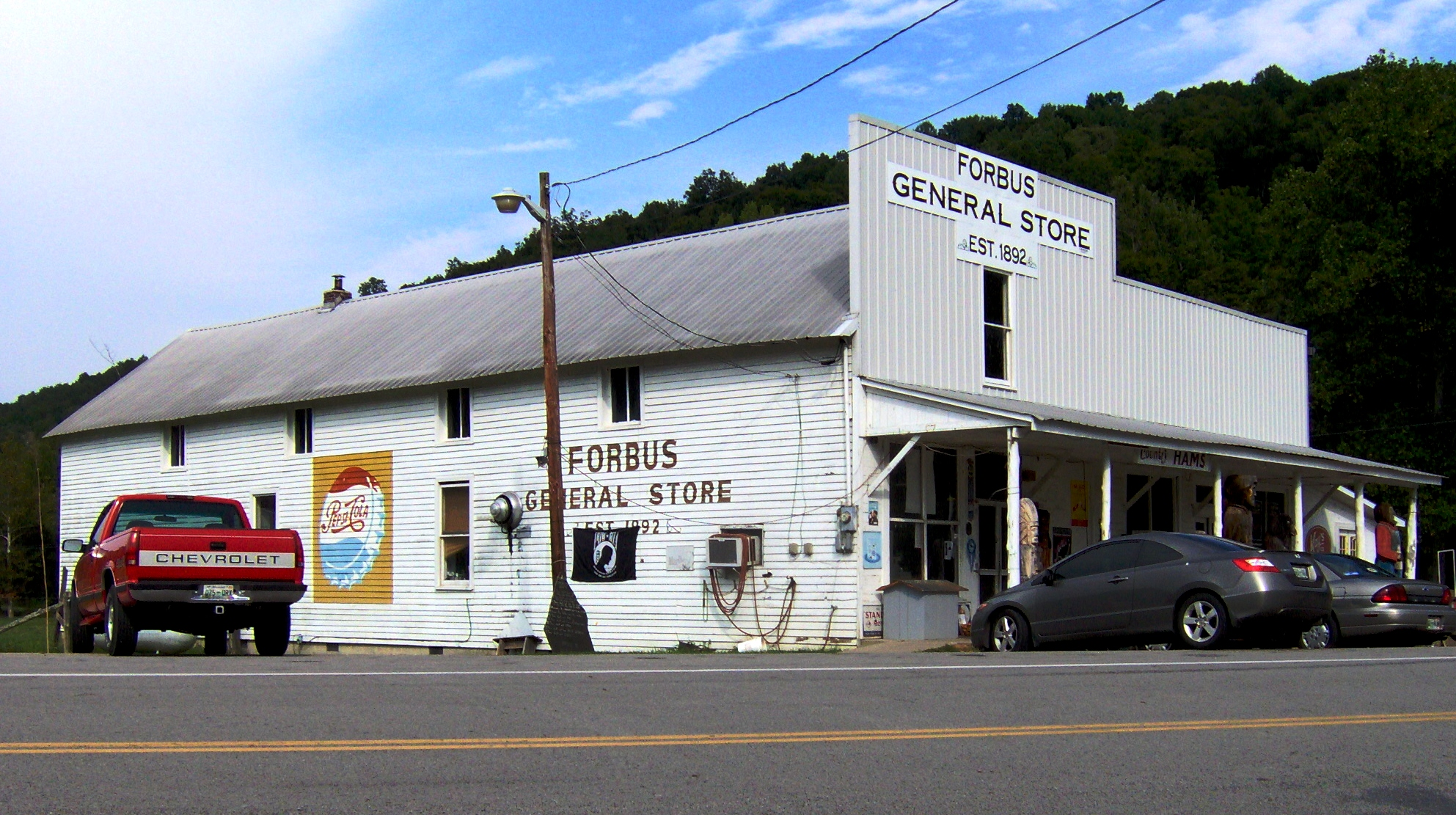
- Forbus General Store

- Location within Tennessee Location within the United States
- Location: TN 28 E of Davidson, Forbus, Tennessee
- Coordinates: 36°33′54″N 85°0′42″W
- MPS: Fentress County MPS
- NRHP reference No.: 91000821
- Added to NRHP: July 3, 1991

Forbus is an unincorporated community located on U.S. Route 127 in Fentress County, Tennessee. Considered a crossroads community, it is listed on the National Register of Historic Places as an historic district called the Forbus Historic District. In 1991 it consisted of a general store, one house, and some outbuildings.

Early names for the community were Blue Rock and Gatewood. In the mid-19th century, the community was briefly home to a school known as the Van Buren Institute. Coal was mined in the area as early as the 19th century. In the early decades of the 20th century, the local economy was based on lumbering, barite mining, and farming. In the 1930s, the community supported a grade school with 84 pupils and 3 teachers, a high school, a weekly newspaper, and two churches.

The Forbus General Store was built by W. M. Johnson in 1892, and was operated by Johnson until his death in 1941. At one time, the store included a gas-powered gristmill, a blacksmith shop, and several granaries, but only the store stands today. The store purchased produce and furs from local residents, and at one point had a contract to supply locally grown apples to a Pennsylvania brandy maker. The store in turn sold hardware, clothing, fertilizer and feed, school textbooks, guns, furniture, and caskets. The store's top floor was once used as a meeting place for an Independent Order of Odd Fellows lodge. The Forbus post office operated out of the store until 1965, and consolidated with the Pall Mall post office in 1972.
