= Jamestown, Tennessee =

- City
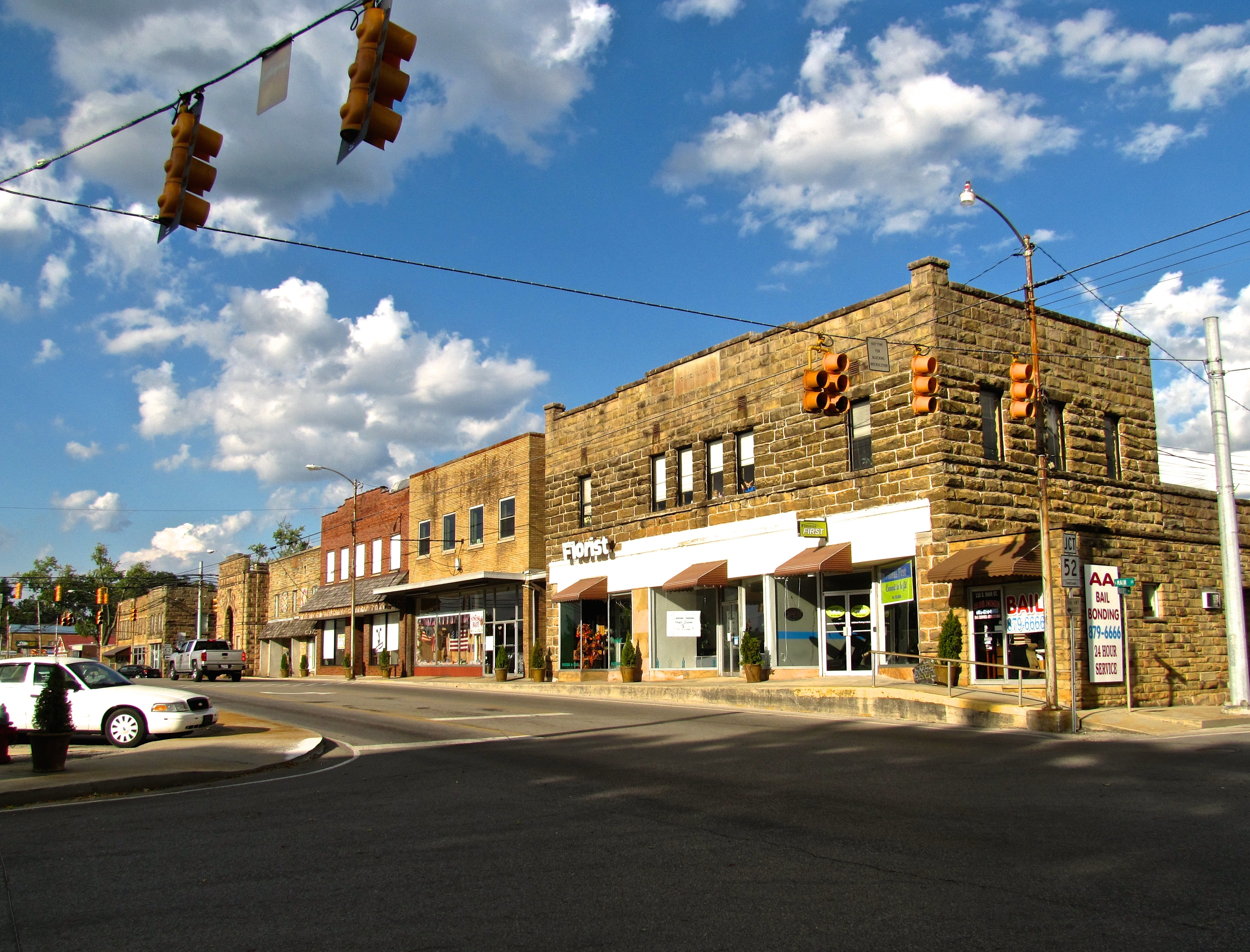
- Buildings along Main Street

- Location of Jamestown in Fentress County, Tennessee.
- Coordinates: 36°25′45″N 84°55′57″W
- Country: United States
- State: Tennessee
- County: Fentress
- Founded: 1823
- Incorporated: 1837
- Named for: James Fentress

Area
  - Total: 3.12 sq mi (8.07 km^{2})
  - Land: 3.12 sq mi (8.07 km^{2})
  - Water: 0 sq mi (0.00 km^{2})
- Elevation: 1,716 ft (523 m)

Population (2020)
  - Total: 1,935
  - Density: 621/sq mi (239.9/km^{2})
- Time zone: UTC-6 (Central (CST))
  - Summer (DST): UTC-5 (CDT)
- ZIP code: 38556
- Area code: 931
- FIPS code: 47-37780
- GNIS feature ID: 1289287
- Website: Official website

Jamestown is a city in and the county seat of Fentress County, Tennessee, United States. The population of the city was 1,935 at the 2020 census.

== History ==
Jamestown was established in 1823 as a county seat for Fentress County. It was incorporated as a city in 1837. Both Fentress County and Jamestown are named for prominent local politician James Fentress (1763–1843), who made the appeal for the new county to be carved out of Overton and Morgan counties.

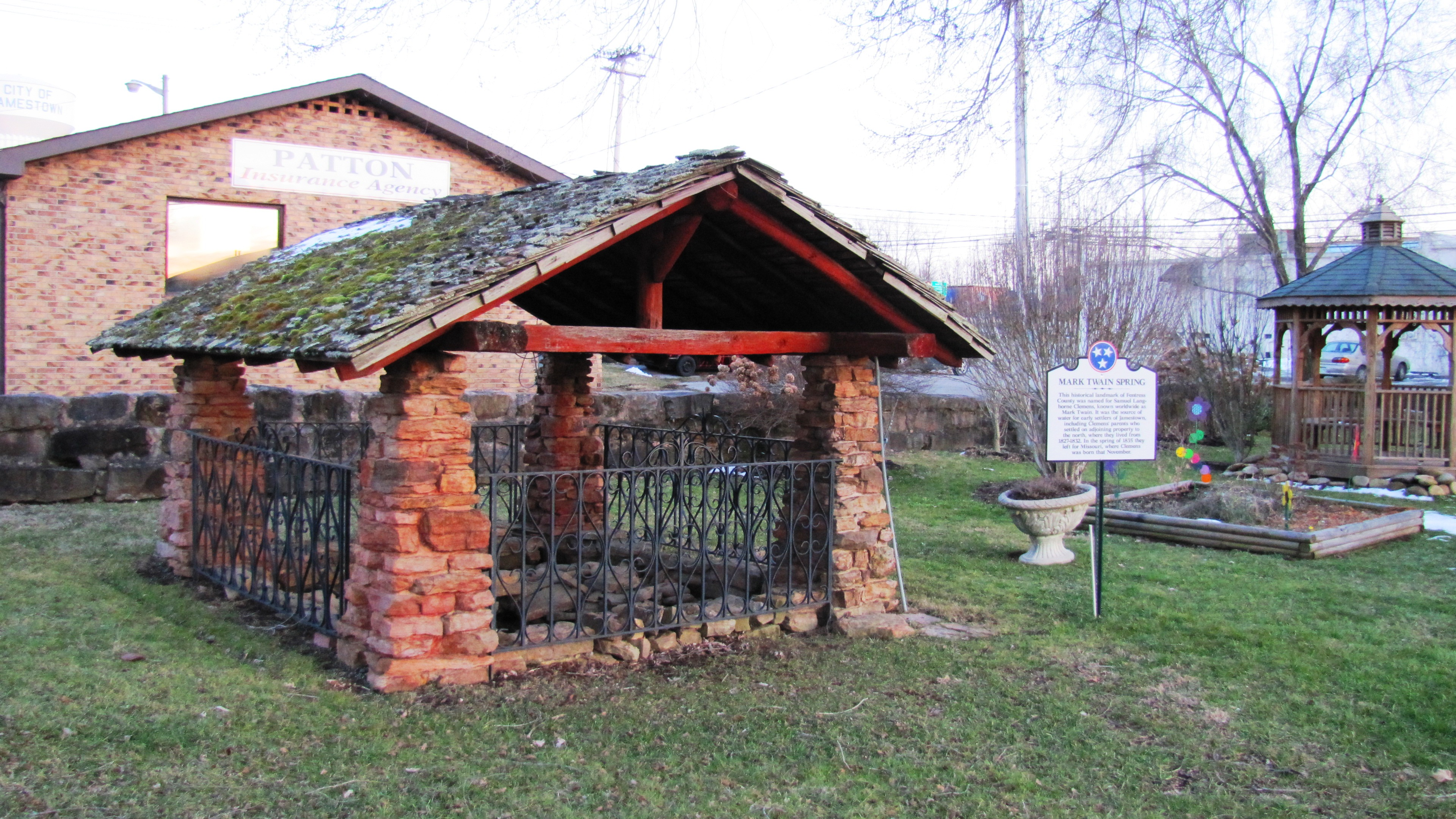
Mark Twain Spring in Jamestown, used by Twain's parents circa 1827-1832

Jamestown was built upon the site of a semi-permanent Cherokee village, which probably made use of the many natural rock shelters in the area. Before the founding of Jamestown, the area was known as "Sand Springs" for the many bubbling springs located within the city. The last remaining spring is located in the Mark Twain City Park, just northeast of the county courthouse. This spring provided water to the family of John M. Clemens, father of noted author Samuel L. Clemens (Mark Twain), before they moved to Missouri. John Clemens served as the first circuit court clerk. He also drew the plans for the first courthouse and jail.

During the American Civil War, Fentress County provided four companies for the Confederate Army and three for the Union Army. The notorious "Tinker Dave" Beaty formed his Union scout company in Fentress County to battle with the pro-Confederate guerrilla's led by Champ Ferguson. Neither of these companies were ever mustered into the armies they supported, and they spent most of their time fighting each other.

World War I hero Sgt. Alvin C. York was born and raised in Fentress County. He built the Alvin C. York Agricultural Institute, a high school in Jamestown. It is one of four state-funded schools in Tennessee.

== Geography ==
Jamestown is located at 36°25′45″N 84°55′57″W (36.429082, -84.932414). The city is located along the western edge of the Cumberland Plateau near the center of Fentress County. Streams in the eastern part of the city are part of the Big South Fork of the Cumberland River watershed, while streams in the western part of the city flow into the upper Obey River watershed.

Jamestown is situated at the intersection of U.S. Route 127, which connects the city with Crossville to the south and Kentucky to the north, and State Route 52, which connects the city with Livingston to the west and Allardt to the southeast. State Route 154 connects the Jamestown area with Pickett State Park to the northeast.

According to the United States Census Bureau, the city has a total area of 2.9 square miles (7.5 km^{2}), all land.

=== Climate ===
Climate data for Jamestown, Tennessee, 1991–2020 normals, extremes 1969–2022
Month	Jan	Feb	Mar	Apr	May	Jun	Jul	Aug	Sep	Oct	Nov	Dec	Year
Record high °F (°C)	74 (23)	74 (23)	84 (29)	87 (31)	89 (32)	103 (39)	101 (38)	100 (38)	95 (35)	92 (33)	81 (27)	75 (24)	103 (39)
Mean maximum °F (°C)	64.5 (18.1)	68.5 (20.3)	75.8 (24.3)	82.8 (28.2)	85.0 (29.4)	89.5 (31.9)	90.4 (32.4)	90.0 (32.2)	88.0 (31.1)	82.2 (27.9)	74.6 (23.7)	65.4 (18.6)	91.8 (33.2)
Mean daily maximum °F (°C)	44.6 (7.0)	48.6 (9.2)	57.8 (14.3)	67.5 (19.7)	74.7 (23.7)	81.8 (27.7)	84.3 (29.1)	84.0 (28.9)	78.1 (25.6)	68.8 (20.4)	57.3 (14.1)	48.0 (8.9)	66.3 (19.1)
Daily mean °F (°C)	34.7 (1.5)	37.9 (3.3)	46.0 (7.8)	54.8 (12.7)	63.6 (17.6)	71.1 (21.7)	74.1 (23.4)	73.5 (23.1)	67.0 (19.4)	56.2 (13.4)	45.6 (7.6)	38.2 (3.4)	55.2 (12.9)
Mean daily minimum °F (°C)	24.9 (−3.9)	27.3 (−2.6)	34.2 (1.2)	42.2 (5.7)	52.5 (11.4)	60.4 (15.8)	63.9 (17.7)	63.1 (17.3)	55.9 (13.3)	43.7 (6.5)	34.0 (1.1)	28.3 (−2.1)	44.2 (6.8)
Mean minimum °F (°C)	3.3 (−15.9)	8.6 (−13.0)	17.8 (−7.9)	26.7 (−2.9)	34.9 (1.6)	48.7 (9.3)	54.3 (12.4)	53.8 (12.1)	42.7 (5.9)	28.3 (−2.1)	18.1 (−7.7)	11.5 (−11.4)	1.5 (−16.9)
Record low °F (°C)	−8 (−22)	−7 (−22)	7 (−14)	16 (−9)	27 (−3)	42 (6)	49 (9)	46 (8)	32 (0)	23 (−5)	11 (−12)	−3 (−19)	−8 (−22)
Average precipitation inches (mm)	5.03 (128)	4.86 (123)	5.52 (140)	5.46 (139)	5.31 (135)	5.52 (140)	5.29 (134)	4.64 (118)	4.00 (102)	3.18 (81)	4.11 (104)	6.26 (159)	59.18 (1,503)
Average snowfall inches (cm)	3.2 (8.1)	5.7 (14)	4.8 (12)	0.1 (0.25)	0.0 (0.0)	0.0 (0.0)	0.0 (0.0)	0.0 (0.0)	0.0 (0.0)	0.0 (0.0)	0.3 (0.76)	4.8 (12)	18.9 (47.11)
Average precipitation days (≥ 0.01 in)	13.8	12.7	13.3	12.2	12.7	12.4	11.6	9.8	9.0	8.9	10.3	13.7	140.4
Average snowy days (≥ 0.1 in)	3.5	3.0	1.9	0.2	0.0	0.0	0.0	0.0	0.0	0.0	0.4	2.5	11.5
Source 1: NOAA
Source 2: National Weather Service

== Demographics ==
Historical population
Census	Pop.	Note	%±
1880	86		—
1890	84		−2.3%
1930	857		—
1940	1,230		43.5%
1950	2,115		72.0%
1960	1,727		−18.3%
1970	1,899		10.0%
1980	2,364		24.5%
1990	1,862		−21.2%
2000	1,839		−1.2%
2010	1,959		6.5%
2020	1,935		−1.2%

=== 2020 census ===
As of the 2020 census, there was a population of 1,935, with 856 households and 396 families residing in the city. The median age was 47.1 years. 17.1% of residents were under the age of 18 and 27.1% of residents were 65 years of age or older. For every 100 females there were 88.2 males, and for every 100 females age 18 and over there were 83.2 males age 18 and over. 0.0% of residents lived in urban areas, while 100.0% lived in rural areas. Of the 856 households in Jamestown, 23.5% had children under the age of 18 living in them. Of all households, 20.3% were married-couple households, 23.8% were households with a male householder and no spouse or partner present, and 47.2% were households with a female householder and no spouse or partner present. About 49.0% of all households were made up of individuals and 20.6% had someone living alone who was 65 years of age or older. There were 992 housing units, of which 13.7% were vacant. The homeowner vacancy rate was 4.3% and the rental vacancy rate was 8.2%.

Racial composition as of the 2020 census
Race	Number	Percent
White	1,803	93.2%
Black or African American	8	0.4%
American Indian and Alaska Native	7	0.4%
Asian	10	0.5%
Native Hawaiian and Other Pacific Islander	0	0.0%
Some other race	9	0.5%
Two or more races	98	5.1%
Hispanic or Latino (of any race)	47	2.4%

=== 2010 census ===
In 2010, Jamestown had the sixth-lowest median household income of all places in the United States with a population over 1,000.

=== 2000 census ===
As of the census of 2000, there was a population of 1,839, with 881 households and 446 families residing in the city. The population density was 634.4 inhabitants per square mile (244.9/km^{2}). There were 1,007 housing units at an average density of 347.4 per square mile (134.1/km^{2}). The racial makeup of the city was 98.42% White, 0.71% African American, 0.05% Asian, 0.05% from other races, and 0.76% from two or more races. Hispanic or Latino of any race were 0.98% of the population.

There were 881 households, out of which 21.5% had children under the age of 18 living with them, 30.6% were married couples living together, 17.1% had a female householder with no husband present, and 49.3% were non-families. 47.8% of all households were made up of individuals, and 21.5% had someone living alone who was 65 years of age or older. The average household size was 1.91 and the average family size was 2.70.

In the city, the population was spread out, with 17.9% under the age of 18, 9.6% from 18 to 24, 24.0% from 25 to 44, 23.8% from 45 to 64, and 24.7% who were 65 years of age or older. The median age was 44 years. For every 100 females, there were 77.0 males. For every 100 females age 18 and over, there were 71.2 males.

The median income for a household in the city was $12,136, and the median income for a family was $18,714. Males had a median income of $23,750 versus $16,094 for females. The per capita income for the city was $11,135. About 28.9% of families and 35.6% of the population were below the poverty line, including 44.8% of those under age 18 and 27.6% of those age 65 or over.

== Media ==
Jamestown has radio stations WCLC-FM/105.1, WDEB/1500 & WDEB-FM/103.9. It also has a low-power FM station, WSAB-LP/92.5. The local newspaper serving Jamestown is the Fentress Courier, published each Wednesday in print and on the internet.

== Events ==
Jamestown is the headquarters for the World's Longest Yardsale, also known as the 127 Corridor Sale.
