= Allardt, Tennessee =

- City
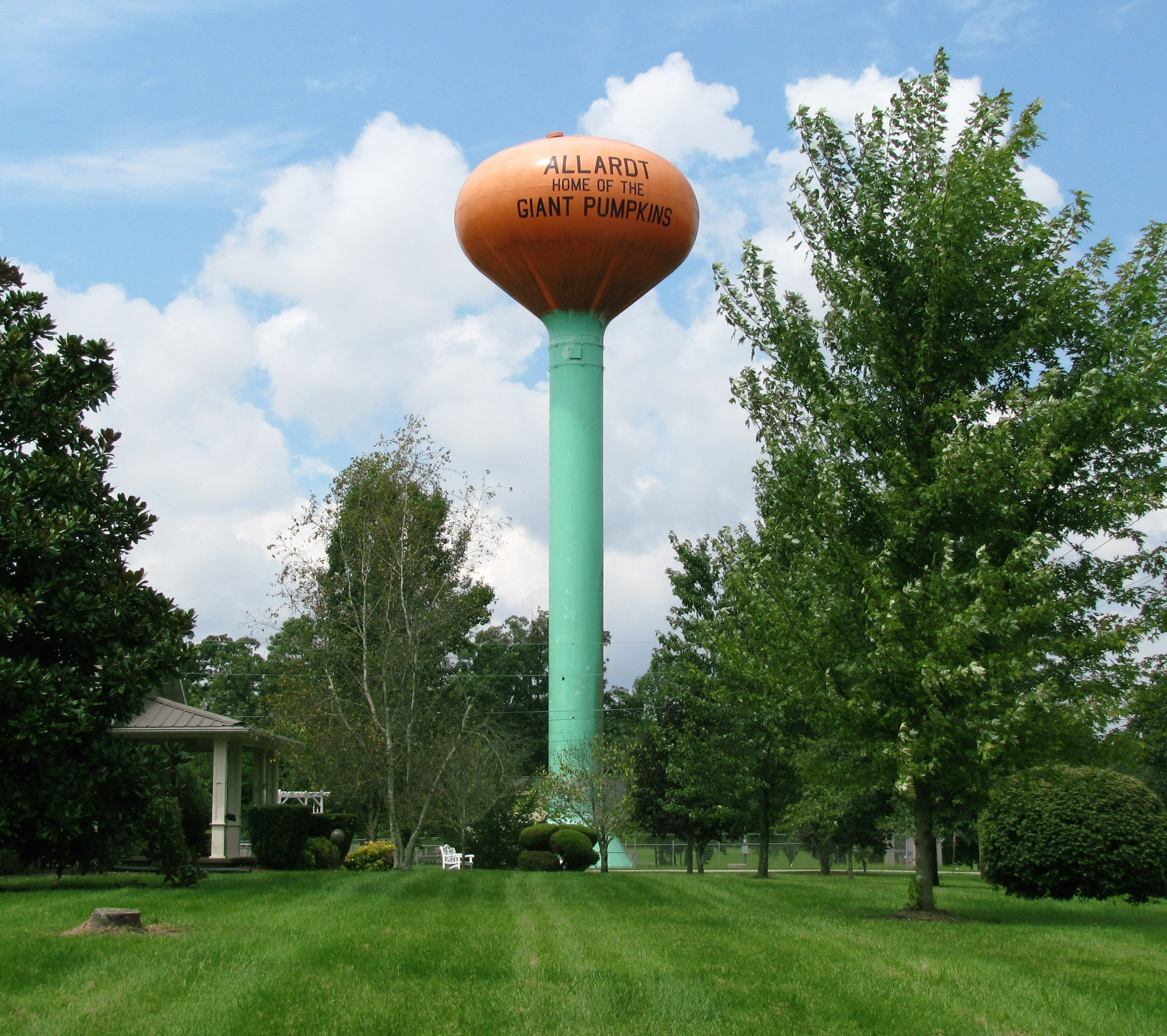
- Pumpkin-shaped water tower in Allardt

- Location of Allardt in Fentress County, Tennessee.
- Coordinates: 36°23′8″N 84°53′8″W
- Country: United States
- State: Tennessee
- County: Fentress
- Incorporated: 1964
- Named for: M.H. Allardt

Government
  - Mayor: Mrs. Yvonne M. Gernt
  - Alderman: Michael Wiley
  - Alderman: Richmond Smith
  - Alderman: Joshua Young
  - Alderman: William Bilbrey

Area
  - Total: 3.77 sq mi (9.76 km^{2})
  - Land: 3.77 sq mi (9.76 km^{2})
  - Water: 0 sq mi (0.00 km^{2})
- Elevation: 1,677 ft (511 m)

Population (2020)
  - Total: 555
  - Density: 147.2/sq mi (56.84/km^{2})
- Time zone: UTC-6 (Central (CST))
  - Summer (DST): UTC-5 (CDT)
- ZIP code: 38504
- Area code: 931
- FIPS code: 47-00660
- GNIS feature ID: 1269300

Allardt is a city in Fentress County, Tennessee, United States. The population was 555 at the 2020 census. The current mayor Mrs. Yvonne M. Gernt was elected in 2022. According to the city charter, there are four city council board members, currently (as of 2025) Michael Wiley, Richmond Smith, Joshua Young, and William Bilbrey.

== History ==
After 1880, M.H. Allardt and Bruno Gernt brought a group of Germans from Michigan to settle in the area. The town was incorporated in 1964.

== Geography ==
According to the United States Census Bureau, the city has a total area of 3.8 square miles (9.8 km^{2}), all of it land. The city is situated atop the western Cumberland Plateau in a relatively broad area surrounded by rugged hills. Tennessee State Route 52 passes roughly west-to-east through the city, connecting it with Jamestown to the northwest and Rugby to the east. State Route 296 intersects State Route 52 near the center of Allardt, and continues directly westward to U.S. Route 127.

Colditz Cove State Natural Area, best known for the 60-foot (18 m) Northrup Falls, lies just southeast of Allardt. The Big South Fork National River and Recreation Area lies a few miles to the northeast.

== Demographics ==
Historical population
Census	Pop.	Note	%±
1970	610		—
1980	654		7.2%
1990	609		−6.9%
2000	642		5.4%
2010	634		−1.2%
2020	555		−12.5%

=== 2020 census ===
Racial composition as of the 2020 census
Race	Number	Percent
White	538	96.9%
Black or African American	2	0.4%
American Indian and Alaska Native	0	0.0%
Asian	0	0.0%
Native Hawaiian and Other Pacific Islander	0	0.0%
Some other race	0	0.0%
Two or more races	15	2.7%
Hispanic or Latino (of any race)	0	0.0%

As of the 2020 census, Allardt had a population of 555, with 266 households and 171 families residing in the city. The median age was 54.8 years. 17.8% of residents were under the age of 18 and 32.1% of residents were 65 years of age or older. For every 100 females there were 83.8 males, and for every 100 females age 18 and over there were 78.8 males age 18 and over.

0.0% of residents lived in urban areas, while 100.0% lived in rural areas.

Of the households, 23.2% had children under the age of 18 living in them. Of all households, 52.9% were married-couple households, 12.5% were households with a male householder and no spouse or partner present, and 29.7% were households with a female householder and no spouse or partner present. About 30.4% of all households were made up of individuals and 17.9% had someone living alone who was 65 years of age or older.

There were 307 housing units, of which 14.3% were vacant. The homeowner vacancy rate was 1.7% and the rental vacancy rate was 4.9%.

=== 2000 census ===
As of the census of 2000, there was a population of 642, with 259 households and 197 families residing in the city. The population density was 170.0 inhabitants per square mile (65.6/km^{2}). There were 283 housing units at an average density of 74.9 per square mile (28.9/km^{2}). The racial makeup of the city was 98.91% White, 0.16% Native American, 0.16% Asian, and 0.78% from two or more races. Hispanic or Latino of any race were 0.31% of the population.

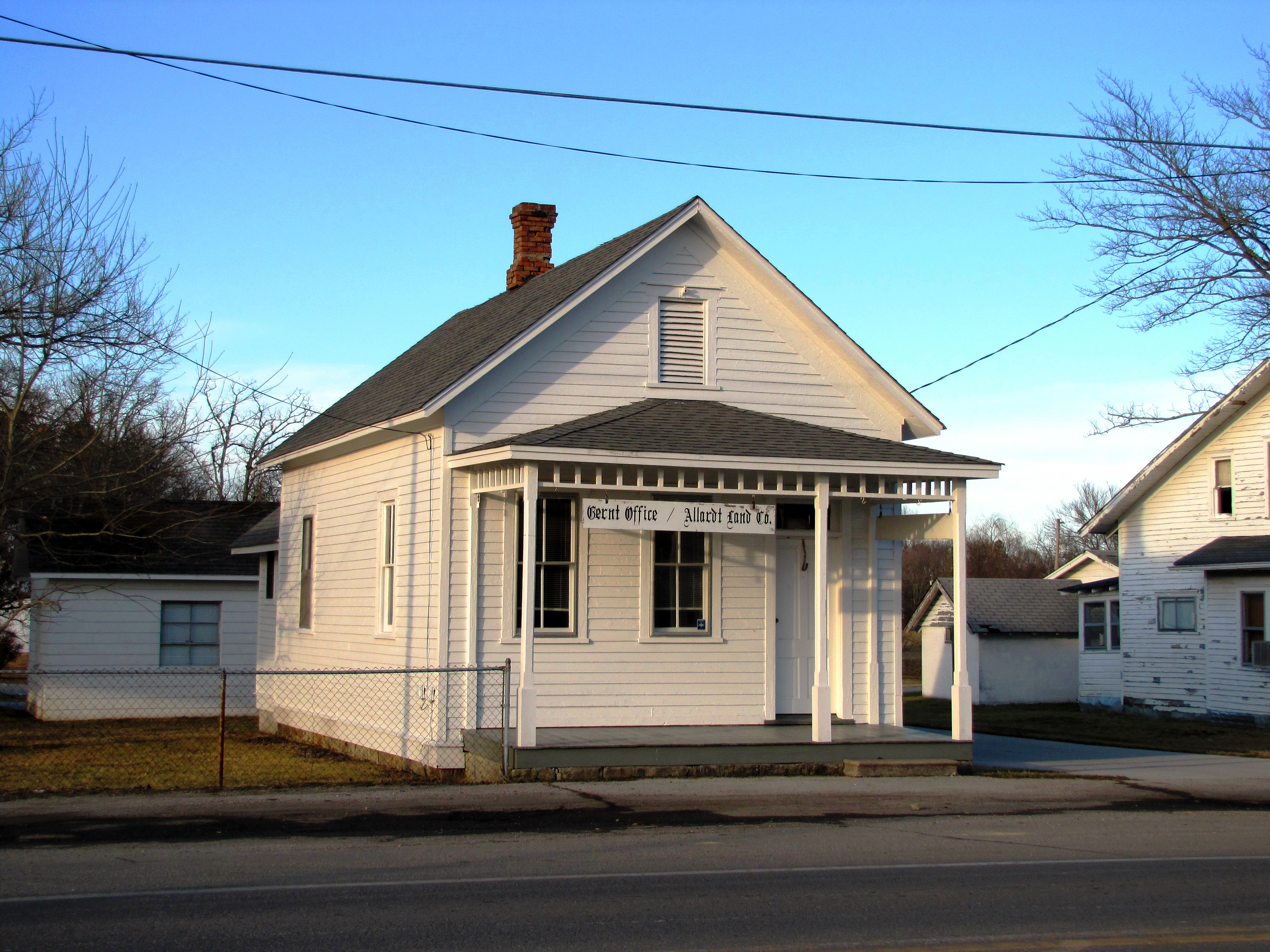
The old Gernt land office

There were 259 households, out of which 31.3% had children under the age of 18 living with them, 64.5% were married couples living together, 9.7% had a female householder with no husband present, and 23.9% were non-families. 21.2% of all households were made up of individuals, and 10.0% had someone living alone who was 65 years of age or older. The average household size was 2.48 and the average family size was 2.85.

In the city, the population was spread out, with 22.7% under the age of 18, 6.1% from 18 to 24, 26.0% from 25 to 44, 25.9% from 45 to 64, and 19.3% who were 65 years of age or older. The median age was 42 years. For every 100 females, there were 92.8 males. For every 100 females age 18 and over, there were 87.2 males.

The median income for a household in the city was $34,412, and the median income for a family was $35,938. Males had a median income of $27,333 versus $18,929 for females. The per capita income for the city was $18,382. About 7.6% of families and 9.5% of the population were below the poverty line, including 16.2% of those under age 18 and 7.4% of those age 65 or over.

== Arts and culture ==
=== Annual events ===
On the first Saturday of Every October the town hosts the Great Pumpkin Festival and Weigh-Off, which coincides with world-wide pumpkin weigh-off.

== Climate ==
The climate in this area is characterized by hot, humid summers and generally mild to cool winters. According to the Köppen Climate Classification system, Allardt has a humid subtropical climate, abbreviated "Cfa" on climate maps.

Climate data for Allardt, Tennessee (1991–2020 normals, extremes 1928–present)
Month	Jan	Feb	Mar	Apr	May	Jun	Jul	Aug	Sep	Oct	Nov	Dec	Year
Record high °F (°C)	74 (23)	77 (25)	89 (32)	90 (32)	95 (35)	104 (40)	103 (39)	103 (39)	102 (39)	95 (35)	82 (28)	75 (24)	104 (40)
Mean daily maximum °F (°C)	44.4 (6.9)	48.9 (9.4)	57.1 (13.9)	67.2 (19.6)	73.4 (23.0)	79.8 (26.6)	82.5 (28.1)	82.4 (28.0)	77.6 (25.3)	68.0 (20.0)	56.2 (13.4)	47.4 (8.6)	65.4 (18.6)
Daily mean °F (°C)	35.8 (2.1)	39.4 (4.1)	46.7 (8.2)	56.0 (13.3)	63.1 (17.3)	70.1 (21.2)	73.5 (23.1)	72.6 (22.6)	67.1 (19.5)	56.9 (13.8)	46.2 (7.9)	38.8 (3.8)	55.5 (13.1)
Mean daily minimum °F (°C)	27.1 (−2.7)	29.9 (−1.2)	36.3 (2.4)	44.8 (7.1)	52.8 (11.6)	60.4 (15.8)	64.5 (18.1)	62.8 (17.1)	56.6 (13.7)	45.7 (7.6)	36.2 (2.3)	30.1 (−1.1)	45.6 (7.6)
Record low °F (°C)	−27 (−33)	−16 (−27)	−4 (−20)	15 (−9)	26 (−3)	35 (2)	42 (6)	36 (2)	29 (−2)	17 (−8)	−8 (−22)	−17 (−27)	−27 (−33)
Average precipitation inches (mm)	4.94 (125)	5.03 (128)	5.75 (146)	5.36 (136)	5.22 (133)	5.56 (141)	5.70 (145)	4.66 (118)	4.03 (102)	3.17 (81)	4.69 (119)	5.71 (145)	59.82 (1,519)
Average snowfall inches (cm)	4.0 (10)	3.8 (9.7)	2.4 (6.1)	0.4 (1.0)	0.0 (0.0)	0.0 (0.0)	0.0 (0.0)	0.0 (0.0)	0.0 (0.0)	0.1 (0.25)	0.1 (0.25)	2.4 (6.1)	13.2 (34)
Average precipitation days (≥ 0.01 in)	13.1	12.4	13.1	12.2	12.8	13.1	12.9	10.7	9.1	9.4	9.6	13.5	141.9
Average snowy days (≥ 0.1 in)	2.6	2.3	1.0	0.1	0.0	0.0	0.0	0.0	0.0	0.0	0.1	1.8	7.9
Source: NOAA
