= Fentress County, Tennessee =

County in Tennessee, United States

- County
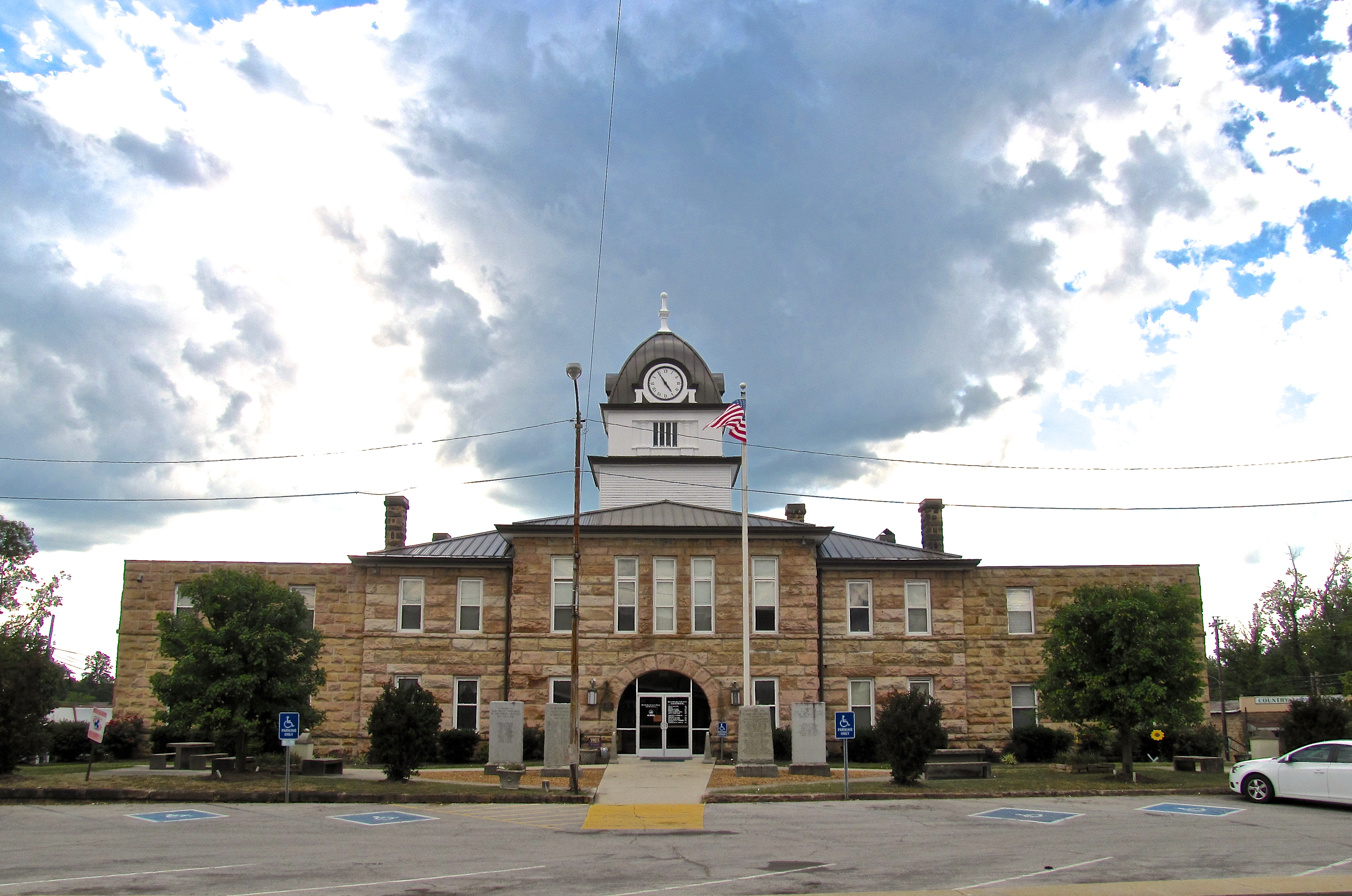
- Fentress County Courthouse in Jamestown

- Location within the U.S. state of Tennessee
- Coordinates: 36°22′50″N 84°55′57″W
- Country: United States
- State: Tennessee
- Founded: November 28, 1823
- Named for: James Fentress, state legislator
- Seat: Jamestown
- Largest city: Jamestown

Government
  - County Executive: Jacob E. Rosenbaum

Area
  - Total: 499 sq mi (1,290 km^{2})
  - Land: 499 sq mi (1,290 km^{2})
  - Water: 0.3 sq mi (0.78 km^{2}) 0.06%

Population (2020)
  - Total: 18,489
  - Estimate (2025): 20,322 ▲
  - Density: 36/sq mi (14/km^{2})
- Time zone: UTC−6 (Central)
  - Summer (DST): UTC−5 (CDT)
- Congressional district: 6th
- Website: www.fentresscountytn.gov

Fentress County is a county located in the U.S. state of Tennessee. As of the 2020 census, the population was 18,489. Its county seat is Jamestown.

== History ==
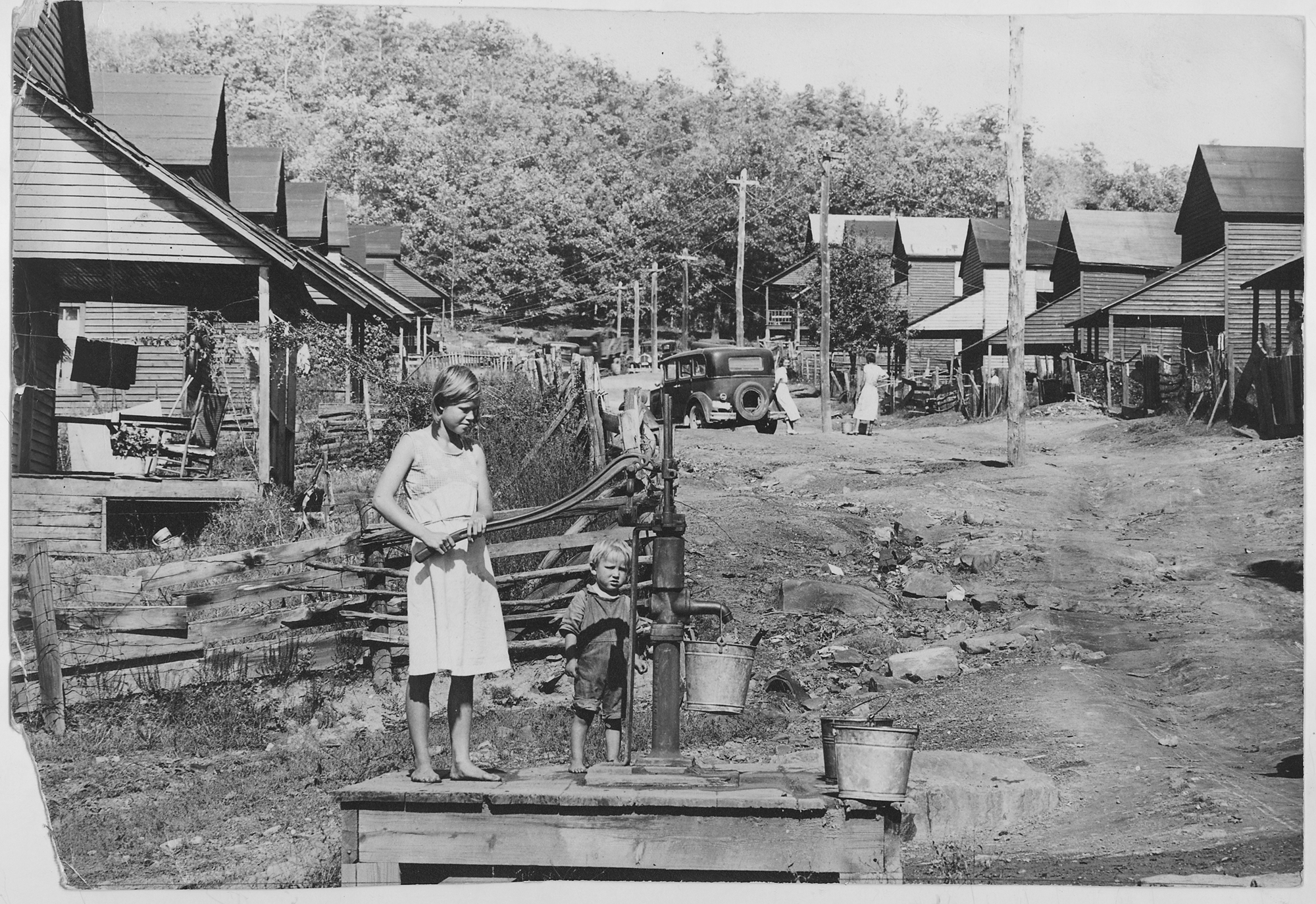
Pumping water by hand in 1942 from the sole water supply in this section of Wilder, Tennessee in Fentress County

Fentress County was formed on November 28, 1823, from portions of Morgan, Overton and White counties. The resulting county was named for James Fentress (1763–1843), who served as speaker of the state house, chairman of Montgomery County Court, and commissioner to select seats for Haywood, Carroll, Gibson and Weakley counties in West Tennessee.

Fentress County was the site of several saltpeter mines. Saltpeter is the main ingredient of gunpowder and was obtained by leaching the earth from local caves. The largest mine was in York Cave, near the Wolf River Post Office. At one time, twenty-five large leaching vats were in operation in this cave. According to Barr (1961) this cave was mined during the Civil War. Buffalo Cave near Jamestown was also a major mine with twelve leaching vats. Manson Saltpeter Cave in Big Indian Creek Valley was a smaller operation with four leaching vats. These caves may also have been mined during the War of 1812, as saltpeter mining was widespread in Kentucky and Tennessee during that era.

In the runup to the American Civil War, when Tennessee Governor Harris asked the State Legislature for a vote of secession, the two representatives from Fentress County (Reese T. Hildreth and R. H. Bledsoe) voted for secession. Nevertheless, in Tennessee's Ordinance of Secession referendum on June 8, 1861, Fentress County voted by a margin of 651 to 128 to remain in the Union. However, earlier on February 9, 1861, Fentress County voters had voted to hold a secession convention by a very narrow margin of 334 to 325, becoming the only county that voted for the convention in February but to remain in the Union in June.

Alvin York (1887–1964), a hero at the Meuse-Argonne Offensive during World War I, was born and lived in Fentress County. He established the Alvin C. York Agricultural Institute in Jamestown in 1924. York's house and farm are part of Sgt. Alvin C. York State Historic Park in Pall Mall.

== Geography ==
According to the U.S. Census Bureau, the county has a total area of 499 square miles (1,290 km^{2}), of which 499 square miles (1,290 km^{2}) is land and 0.3 square miles (0.78 km^{2}) (0.06%) is water.

Fentress County includes part of Dale Hollow Reservoir and is drained by forks of the Obey and Cumberland Rivers.

The county is the easternmost county in the United States to observe Central Time. Morgan and Scott counties, which border Fentress county on the east, are in the Eastern Time Zone.

=== Adjacent counties ===
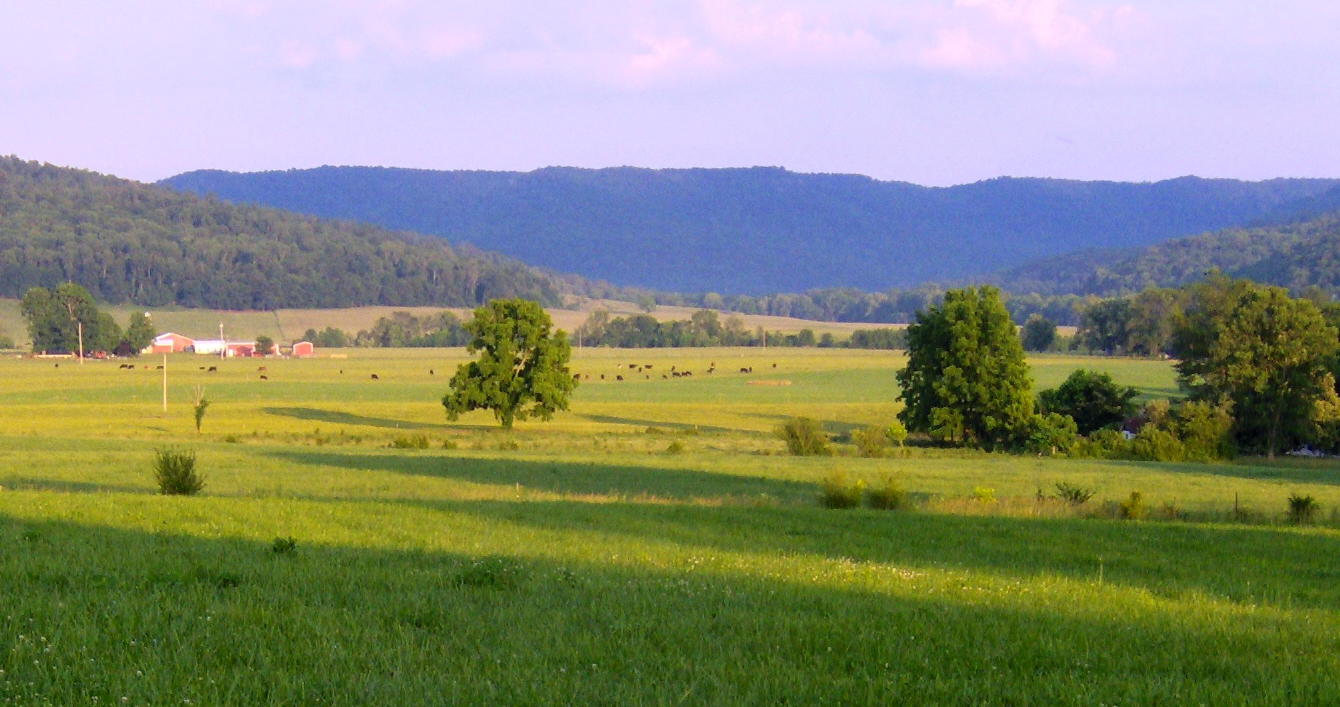
Valley of the Three Forks near Pall Mall, with the Cumberland Plateau dominating the horizon

- Pickett County (north)
- Scott County (east)
- Morgan County (southeast)
- Cumberland County (south)
- Overton County (west)
- Putnam County (southwest)

=== National protected area ===
- Big South Fork National River and Recreation Area (part)

=== State protected areas ===
- Catoosa Wildlife Management Area (part)
- Colditz Cove State Natural Area
- Pickett State Forest (part)
- Pogue Creek Canyon State Natural Area
- Scott State Forest (part)
- Sgt. Alvin C. York State Historic Park
- Skinner Mountain Wildlife Management Area
- Twin Arches State Natural Area (part)

== Demographics ==
Historical population
Census	Pop.	Note	%±
1830	2,748		—
1840	3,550		29.2%
1850	4,454		25.5%
1860	5,054		13.5%
1870	4,717		−6.7%
1880	5,941		25.9%
1890	5,226		−12.0%
1900	6,106		16.8%
1910	7,446		21.9%
1920	10,435		40.1%
1930	11,036		5.8%
1940	14,262		29.2%
1950	14,917		4.6%
1960	13,288		−10.9%
1970	12,593		−5.2%
1980	14,826		17.7%
1990	14,669		−1.1%
2000	16,625		13.3%
2010	17,958		8.0%
2020	18,489		3.0%
2025 (est.)	20,322	▲	9.9%
U.S. Decennial Census; 1790-1960 1900-1990; 1990-2000 2010-2014

=== Racial and ethnic composition ===
Fentress County, Tennessee – Racial and ethnic composition Note: the US Census treats Hispanic/Latino as an ethnic category. This table excludes Latinos from the racial categories and assigns them to a separate category. Hispanics/Latinos may be of any race.
Race / ethnicity (NH = Non-Hispanic)	Pop 1980	Pop 1990	Pop 2000	Pop 2010	Pop 2020	% 1980	% 1990	% 2000	% 2010	% 2020
White alone (NH)	14,689	14,600	16,419	17,522	17,541	99.08%	99.53%	98.76%	97.57%	94.87%
Black or African American alone (NH)	2	2	18	26	25	0.01%	0.01%	0.11%	0.14%	0.14%
Native American or Alaska Native alone (NH)	11	9	25	42	26	0.07%	0.06%	0.15%	0.23%	0.14%
Asian alone (NH)	17	18	15	34	33	0.11%	0.12%	0.09%	0.19%	0.18%
Native Hawaiian or Pacific Islander alone (NH)	x	x	0	4	0	x	x	0.00%	0.02%	0.00%
Other race alone (NH)	1	1	0	2	18	0.01%	0.01%	0.00%	0.01%	0.10%
Mixed race or Multiracial (NH)	x	x	58	140	530	x	x	0.35%	0.78%	2.87%
Hispanic or Latino (any race)	106	39	90	189	316	0.71%	0.27%	0.54%	1.05%	1.71%
Total	14,826	14,669	16,625	17,959	18,489	100.00%	100.00%	100.00%	100.00%	100.00%

=== 2020 census ===
As of the 2020 census, there were 18,489 people, 7,673 households, and 4,929 families residing in the county, and the median age was 47.6 years.

20.6% of residents were under the age of 18 and 23.8% of residents were 65 years of age or older. For every 100 females there were 96.5 males, and for every 100 females age 18 and over there were 94.7 males age 18 and over.

As shown in the table, the racial makeup of the county was 94.87% White (non-Hispanic), 0.14% Black or African American, 0.14% Native American, 0.18% Asian, 2.96% Other/Mixed races, and 1.71% Hispanic or Latino residents of any race.

<0.1% of residents lived in urban areas, while 100.0% lived in rural areas.

There were 7,673 households in the county, of which 25.0% had children under the age of 18 living in them. Of all households, 49.7% were married-couple households, 18.2% were households with a male householder and no spouse or partner present, and 26.1% were households with a female householder and no spouse or partner present. About 29.8% of all households were made up of individuals and 14.8% had someone living alone who was 65 years of age or older.

There were 9,201 housing units, of which 16.6% were vacant. Among occupied housing units, 76.9% were owner-occupied and 23.1% were renter-occupied. The homeowner vacancy rate was 2.1% and the rental vacancy rate was 8.0%.

=== 2010 census ===
As of the 2010 census, there were 17,959 people, 7,326 households, and 4,818 families residing in the county. The population density was 36 people per square mile (14 people/km^{2}). There were 8,927 housing units at an average density of 15 units per square mile (5.8/km^{2}). The racial makeup of the county was 98.1% White, 0.2% Black or African American, 0.2% Native American, 0.2% Asian, 0.4% from other races, and 0.9% from two or more races. 1.1% of the population were Hispanic or Latino of any race.

In the county's 7,326 households, 23.1% had children under the age of 18, 57.30% were married couples living together, 11.30% had a female householder with no husband present, and 28.00% were non-families. 25.50% of all households were made up of individuals, and 11.10% had someone living alone who was 65 years of age or older. The average household size was 2.46 and the average family size was 2.94.

In the county, the population was spread out, with 24.20% under the age of 18, 8.00% from 18 to 24, 28.10% from 25 to 44, 26.10% from 45 to 64, and 13.70% who were 65 years of age or older. The median age was 38 years. For every 100 females there were 96.20 males. For every 100 females age 18 and over, there were 93.10 males.

The median income for a household in the county was $23,238, and the median income for a family was $28,856. Males had a median income of $23,606 versus $18,729 for females. The per capita income for the county was $12,999. 19.50% of families and 23.10% of the population were below the poverty line, including 27.80% of those under age 18 and 20.50% of those over age 64.

== Communities ==
=== Cities ===
- Allardt
- Jamestown

=== Census-designated places ===
- Clarkrange
- Grimsley

=== Unincorporated communities ===
- Armathwaite
- Banner Springs
- Forbus
- Pall Mall
- Sharp Place
- Wilder
- Zenith

== Politics ==
Like much of East Tennessee, Fentress County is powerfully Republican, and has generally been favorable to that party ever since the Civil War. Since then, only two Democrats, Southerners Jimmy Carter in 1976 and Bill Clinton in 1992 and 1996 have carried Fentress County. Since 2000, the county has shifted further and further to the right.

United States presidential election results for Fentress County, Tennessee
Year	Republican		Democratic		Third party(ies)	
Year	No.	%	No.	%	No.	%
1912	444	37.60%	399	33.78%	338	28.62%
1916	925	70.08%	348	26.36%	47	3.56%
1920	1,808	71.66%	694	27.51%	21	0.83%
1924	1,197	70.16%	420	24.62%	89	5.22%
1928	1,398	77.97%	375	20.91%	20	1.12%
1932	1,383	56.31%	961	39.13%	112	4.56%
1936	1,299	61.53%	743	35.20%	69	3.27%
1940	1,365	58.91%	919	39.66%	33	1.42%
1944	1,696	71.38%	657	27.65%	23	0.97%
1948	1,587	60.25%	962	36.52%	85	3.23%
1952	2,143	69.65%	934	30.35%	0	0.00%
1956	2,233	69.52%	934	29.08%	45	1.40%
1960	2,726	71.89%	1,014	26.74%	52	1.37%
1964	1,969	55.95%	1,550	44.05%	0	0.00%
1968	2,026	57.80%	671	19.14%	808	23.05%
1972	2,154	75.50%	665	23.31%	34	1.19%
1976	1,767	47.02%	1,953	51.97%	38	1.01%
1980	2,493	60.76%	1,543	37.61%	67	1.63%
1984	2,922	62.18%	1,755	37.35%	22	0.47%
1988	3,103	62.16%	1,856	37.18%	33	0.66%
1992	2,391	41.52%	2,730	47.40%	638	11.08%
1996	2,307	45.63%	2,332	46.12%	417	8.25%
2000	3,417	56.68%	2,529	41.95%	83	1.38%
2004	4,293	64.07%	2,371	35.39%	36	0.54%
2008	4,789	71.06%	1,831	27.17%	119	1.77%
2012	5,243	76.04%	1,561	22.64%	91	1.32%
2016	6,038	82.34%	1,100	15.00%	195	2.66%
2020	7,441	85.24%	1,214	13.91%	74	0.85%
2024	8,555	87.56%	1,149	11.76%	67	0.69%

== See also ==
- National Register of Historic Places listings in Fentress County, Tennessee
