= Royal Blue (disambiguation) =

Royal blue is a colour.

Royal Blue may also refer to:

- Royal Blue (train), a passenger train between New York City and Washington, D.C., United States
- Royal Blue (yacht), a maxi yacht
- Royal Blue, Tennessee, a community in Campbell County, Tennessee, United States
- Royal Blue (pigeon), an RAF messenger pigeon of World War II
- Myscelia cyaniris or royal blue, a brush-footed butterfly of Central and northern South America
- Orachrysops regalis or royal blue, a butterfly in the family Lycaenidae found in South Africa

== See also ==
- Royal Blue Coach Services, a former coach operator in England
