= Vasper =

Vasper may refer to:

- Vasper, Tennessee, a community in Campbell County, Tennessee
- Peter Vasper, a former English footballer
