= Eastburn =

Eastburn may refer to:

- Places
  - Eastburn, East Riding of Yorkshire, England
  - Eastburn, West Yorkshire, England
  - Eastburn, Illinois, a community in the United States
- People
  - Henry Eastburn (1753–1821), British draughtsman and civil engineer
  - Joseph Eastburn Winner (c. 1837–1918), American composer publishing under an alias of Eastburn
  - Lacey Eastburn (1880–1957), president of Northern Arizona University
  - Manton Eastburn (1801–1872), Bishop in the Episcopal Diocese of Massachusetts
  - Eastburn family murders, 1985 in Fayetteville, North Carolina

== See also ==
- EastBurn (restaurant), Oregon
- Westburn (disambiguation)
