= Westbourne =

Westbourne may refer to:

== Places ==
=== England ===
- Westbourne, Dorset, part of Bournemouth
- Westbourne, London, an area west of Paddington in west London
  - Westbourne (Westminster ward)
- Westbourne, Suffolk, suburb of Ipswich
- Westbourne, West Sussex, a village and parish
  - Westbourne (Chichester ward)
- River Westbourne, in London
- Westbourne (Brighton and Hove ward), a former electoral ward until 2023

=== Elsewhere ===
- Westbourne, Manitoba, Canada, an unincorporated community
- Westbourne (Richmond, Virginia), a historic home located in Richmond, Virginia, United States
- Westbourne, Tennessee, United States, an unincorporated community

== Schools ==
- Westbourne House School, near Chichester in West Sussex, England
- Westbourne School, Penarth, a school in Penarth, Wales
- Westbourne School, an independent school in Sheffield, England
- Westbourne Grammar School, a co-educational school in Melbourne, Australia

== Surname ==
- Britt Westbourne, fictional character

== See also ==
- Westburn (disambiguation)
