= Haskel Ayers =

American politician (1936–2020)

Member of the Tennessee House of Representatives from the 9th district
- In office 1967–1970

Personal details
- Born: Sterling Haskel Ayers; February 10, 1936 Stinking Creek, Tennessee, U.S.
- Died: January 8, 2020 (aged 83) Jacksboro, Tennessee, U.S.
- Party: Republican
- Spouse: Tomi Ayers
- Occupation: auctioneer, furniture dealer, real estate broker

Sterling Haskel "Hack" Ayers (February 10, 1936 – January 8, 2020) was an American auctioneer and politician in the state of Tennessee. Ayers served in the Tennessee House of Representatives from 1967 to 1968. A Republican, he represented the 9th district (Campbell County, Tennessee and Scott County, Tennessee). Residing in LaFollette, Tennessee, Ayers was an auctioneer, furniture dealer, and real estate broker. He was the founder of Ayers Auction & Real Estate in LaFollette and was a former president of the National Auctioneers Association. He was also a member of the NAA Hall of Fame. Ayers died in 2020 at the age of 83.
