= Orachrysops nasutus =

Conservation status
- Least Concern (IUCN 3.1)

Scientific classification
- Kingdom: Animalia
- Phylum: Arthropoda
- Class: Insecta
- Order: Lepidoptera
- Family: Lycaenidae
- Genus: Orachrysops
- Species: O. nasutus

Binomial name
- Orachrysops nasutus Henning & Henning, 1994

Species of butterfly

Orachrysops nasutus, the nosy blue, is a butterfly of the family Lycaenidae. It is found in South Africa.

The wingspan is 30–38 mm for males and 25–39 mm for females. Adults are on wing from December to January. There is one generation per year.

The larvae feed on Indigofera cuneifolia.

== Subspecies ==
- Orachrysops nasutus nasutus (high altitude montane grassland in the Amatolas and the southern Drakensberg in the Eastern Cape)
- Orachrysops nasutus remus Henning & Henning, 1994 (Lesotho to the south-eastern KwaZulu-Natal Drakensberg)
