= Orachrysops montanus =

Conservation status
- Vulnerable (IUCN 3.1)

Scientific classification
- Kingdom: Animalia
- Phylum: Arthropoda
- Class: Insecta
- Order: Lepidoptera
- Family: Lycaenidae
- Genus: Orachrysops
- Species: O. montanus

Binomial name
- Orachrysops montanus Henning & Henning, 1994

Species of butterfly

Orachrysops montanus, the Golden Gate blue, is a butterfly of the family Lycaenidae. It is found in South Africa, where it is known from montane grassland in the Golden Gate Highlands.

The wingspan is 28–36 mm for males and 24–30 mm for females. Adults are on wing from December to January. There is one generation per year.

The larvae feed on Indigofera species.
