= Wooldridge, Tennessee =

- Unincorporated community
- Location within Tennessee Location within the United States
- Coordinates: 36°34′36″N 84°11′2″W
- Country: United States
- State: Tennessee
- County: Campbell
- Elevation: 1,030 ft (310 m)
- Time zone: UTC-6 (Central (CST))
  - Summer (DST): UTC-5 (CDT)
- GNIS feature ID: 1304677

Wooldridge is an unincorporated community and coal town in Campbell County, Tennessee. Their post office is closed.
