= Jellico, Tennessee =

- City
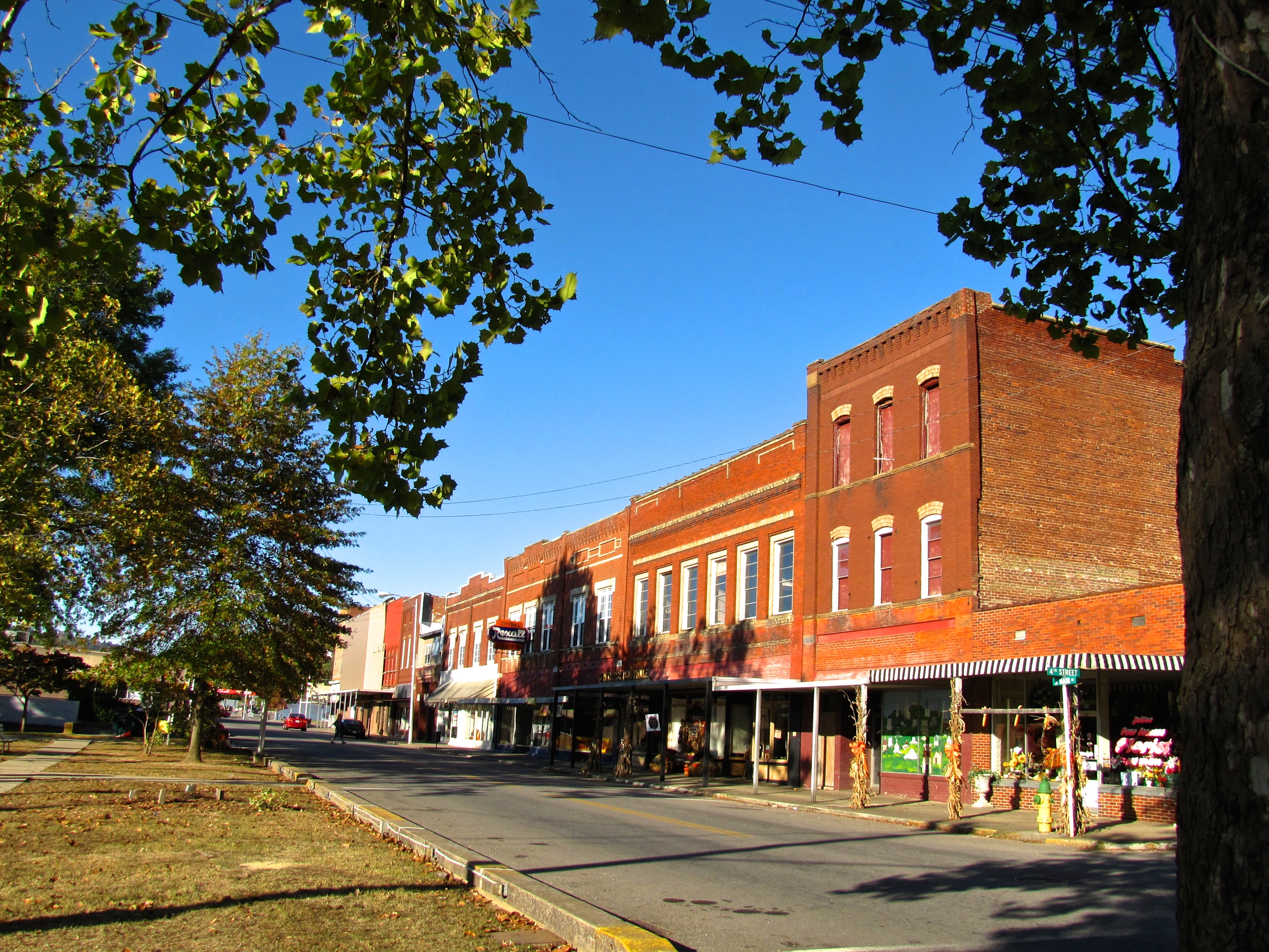
- North Main Street

- Location of Jellico in Campbell County, Tennessee

- Location within Tennessee
- Coordinates: 36°34′57″N 84°7′50″W
- Country: United States
- State: Tennessee
- County: Campbell
- Founded: 1878
- Incorporated: 1883
- Named for: Jellico coal

Area
  - Total: 6.29 sq mi (16.29 km^{2})
  - Land: 6.22 sq mi (16.11 km^{2})
  - Water: 0.073 sq mi (0.19 km^{2})
- Elevation: 971 ft (296 m)

Population (2020)
  - Total: 2,154
  - Density: 346.4/sq mi (133.74/km^{2})
- Time zone: UTC-5 (Eastern (EST))
  - Summer (DST): UTC-4 (EDT)
- ZIP code: 37762
- Area code: 423
- FIPS code: 47-38020
- GNIS feature ID: 1289336
- Website: City website

Jellico is a city in Campbell County, Tennessee, United States, on the state border with Kentucky, 58 miles (93 km) by road north of Knoxville. As of the 2020 census, Jellico had a population of 2,154.

== History ==
The name "Jellico" is a local alteration of "angelica", the name of an herb that grows in abundance in the surrounding mountains. The name was first applied to the mountains to the west and to the mountains' main drainage, Jellico Creek, which passes 5 miles (8 km) west of the city of Jellico and empties into the Cumberland River near Williamsburg, Kentucky.

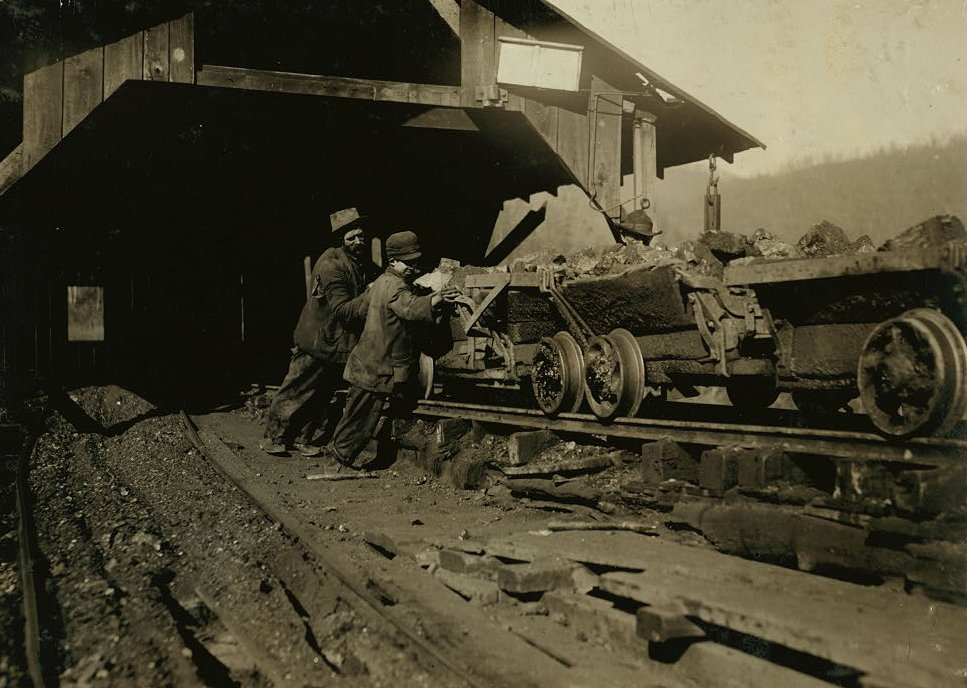
A child laborer at Proctor Coal near Jellico, 1910, photo by Lewis Hine

In the early 1880s, a high-quality bituminous coal vein was discovered in the Jellico Mountains, and with the completion of railroad tracks to the area in 1883, coal mines quickly sprang up throughout the area. The city of Jellico was initially founded as "Smithburg" in 1878, but changed its name to "Jellico" in 1883 to capitalize on the growing popularity of Jellico coal. The city was incorporated on March 7, 1883.

Throughout the 1890s and early 1900s, Jellico was one of the most productive coal fields in Kentucky and Tennessee. In 1906, a railroad car packed with dynamite exploded in Jellico, killing eight and destroying part of the town. The town quickly recovered, however, and many of the buildings in the Main Street area date from this period.

On July 6, 1944, at High Cliff (3 miles east of Jellico), a troop train carrying new recruits on the Louisville and Nashville Railroad derailed, causing the locomotive and four leading cars to fall 50 feet into Clear Fork; 35 people were killed and 100 more injured.

In 1971, Indian Mountain State Park was created at the site of a reclaimed strip mine in western Jellico. In 1999, much of North and South Main Street was placed on the National Register of Historic Places as the Jellico Commercial Historic District.

== Geography ==
Jellico is located along the northern border of Tennessee at 36°34′57″N 84°7′50″W (36.582627, -84.130608). The city is situated amidst the Cumberland Mountains in the valley of Elk Creek, which flows north into Kentucky. Jellico spans the western bases and slopes of three steep hills that split the Elk Creek valley from the larger Clear Fork valley to the east. A prominent knob known as Indian Mountain rises nearly 1,000 feet (300 m) above Jellico to the west, and is visible from most of the city. This mountain and an adjacent lake are now home to Indian Mountain State Park. The larger Jellico Mountain dominates the area beyond Indian Mountain to the west, and Pine Mountain dominates the area beyond the Clear Fork Valley to the east.

Jellico is concentrated around the junction of U.S. Route 25W (North Main Street and 5th Street), which connects Jellico to Interstate 75 to the southeast and Corbin, Kentucky, to the north, and Tennessee State Route 297 (South Main Street), which connects Jellico with Huntsville to the southwest. The Tennessee-Kentucky state line forms Jellico's official northern boundary, although houses and businesses associated with the city are on both sides of the border.

According to the United States Census Bureau, the city has a total area of 6.4 square miles (16.5 km^{2}), of which 0.08 sq mi (0.2 km^{2}), or 1.15%, is covered by water.

== Demographics ==
Historical population
Census	Pop.	Note	%±
1890	758		—
1900	1,283		69.3%
1910	1,862		45.1%
1920	1,878		0.9%
1930	1,530		−18.5%
1940	1,581		3.3%
1950	1,556		−1.6%
1960	2,210		42.0%
1970	2,235		1.1%
1980	2,798		25.2%
1990	2,447		−12.5%
2000	2,448		0.0%
2010	2,355		−3.8%
2020	2,154		−8.5%

=== 2020 census ===
As of the 2020 census, Jellico had a population of 2,154, with 948 households and 526 families residing in the city.

Racial composition as of the 2020 census
Race	Number	Percent
White	2,043	94.8%
Black or African American	31	1.4%
American Indian and Alaska Native	6	0.3%
Asian	4	0.2%
Native Hawaiian and Other Pacific Islander	0	0.0%
Some other race	3	0.1%
Two or more races	67	3.1%
Hispanic or Latino (of any race)	9	0.4%

As of the 2020 census, the median age was 47.2 years. 19.0% of residents were under the age of 18 and 24.5% of residents were 65 years of age or older. For every 100 females there were 88.0 males, and for every 100 females age 18 and over there were 83.0 males age 18 and over.

0.0% of residents lived in urban areas, while 100.0% lived in rural areas.

There were 948 households in Jellico, of which 26.3% had children under the age of 18 living in them. Of all households, 35.5% were married-couple households, 20.7% were households with a male householder and no spouse or partner present, and 38.3% were households with a female householder and no spouse or partner present. About 39.2% of all households were made up of individuals and 17.6% had someone living alone who was 65 years of age or older.

There were 1,069 housing units, of which 11.3% were vacant. The homeowner vacancy rate was 4.0% and the rental vacancy rate was 3.7%.

=== 2000 census ===
As of the 2000 census, 2,448 people, 1,022 households, and 657 families lived in the city. The population density was 561.7 inhabitants per square mile (216.9/km^{2}). The 1,105 housing units had an average density of 253.5 per square mile (97.9/km^{2}). The racial makeup of the city was 96.24% White, 1.96% African American, 0.16% Native American, 0.65% Asian, and 0.98% from other or two or more races. Hispanics or Latinos of any race were 0.37% of the population.

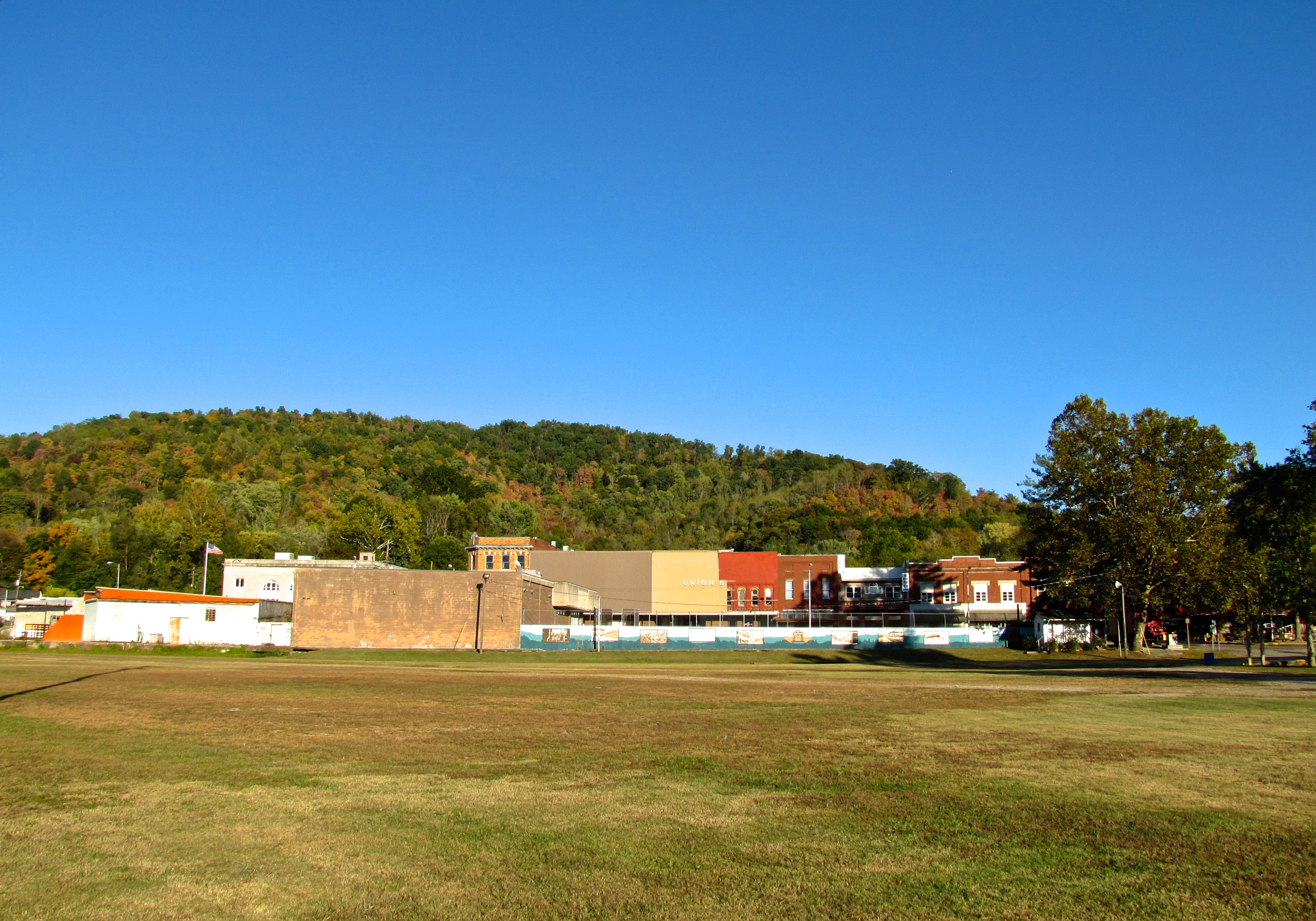
North Main Street blocks, viewed from the railroad tracks

Of the 1,022 households, 26.7% had children under 18 living with them, 44.1% were married couples living together, 16.2% had a female householder with no husband present, and 35.7% were not families. About 32.8% of all households were made up of individuals, and 17.1% had someone living alone who was 65 or older. The average household size was 2.29 and the average family size was 2.90.

In the city, the age distribution was 21.0% under 18, 8.7% from 18 to 24, 24.1% from 25 to 44, 25.1% from 45 to 64, and 21.0% who were 65 or older. The median age was 42 years. For every 100 females, there were 82.8 males. For every 100 females 18 and over, there were 78.3 males.

The median income for a household in the city was $20,303, and for a family was $25,709. Males had a median income of $27,619 versus $16,953 for females. The per capita income for the city was $11,587. About 28.8% of families and 31.9% of the population were below the poverty line, including 45.3% of those under 18 and 23.2% of those 65 or over.

== Economy ==
Jellico Community Hospital is the largest employer with around 350 employees.

Several restaurants, hotels/motels, and gas stations are located off Jellico's exit of Interstate 75, exit 160. A Tennessee Welcome Center is located along the interstate just south of the state line.

== Religion ==
Since 1922, Jellico has been the home of the denominational headquarters for the Church of God Mountain Assembly, a holiness Pentecostal Christian denomination.

== Notable people ==
Jellico was the childhood home of Grace Moore, soprano star of opera, musical theatre, and film, and Homer Rodeheaver, hymn-writer, trombonist, and pioneer in the recording of sacred music.

== Gallery ==
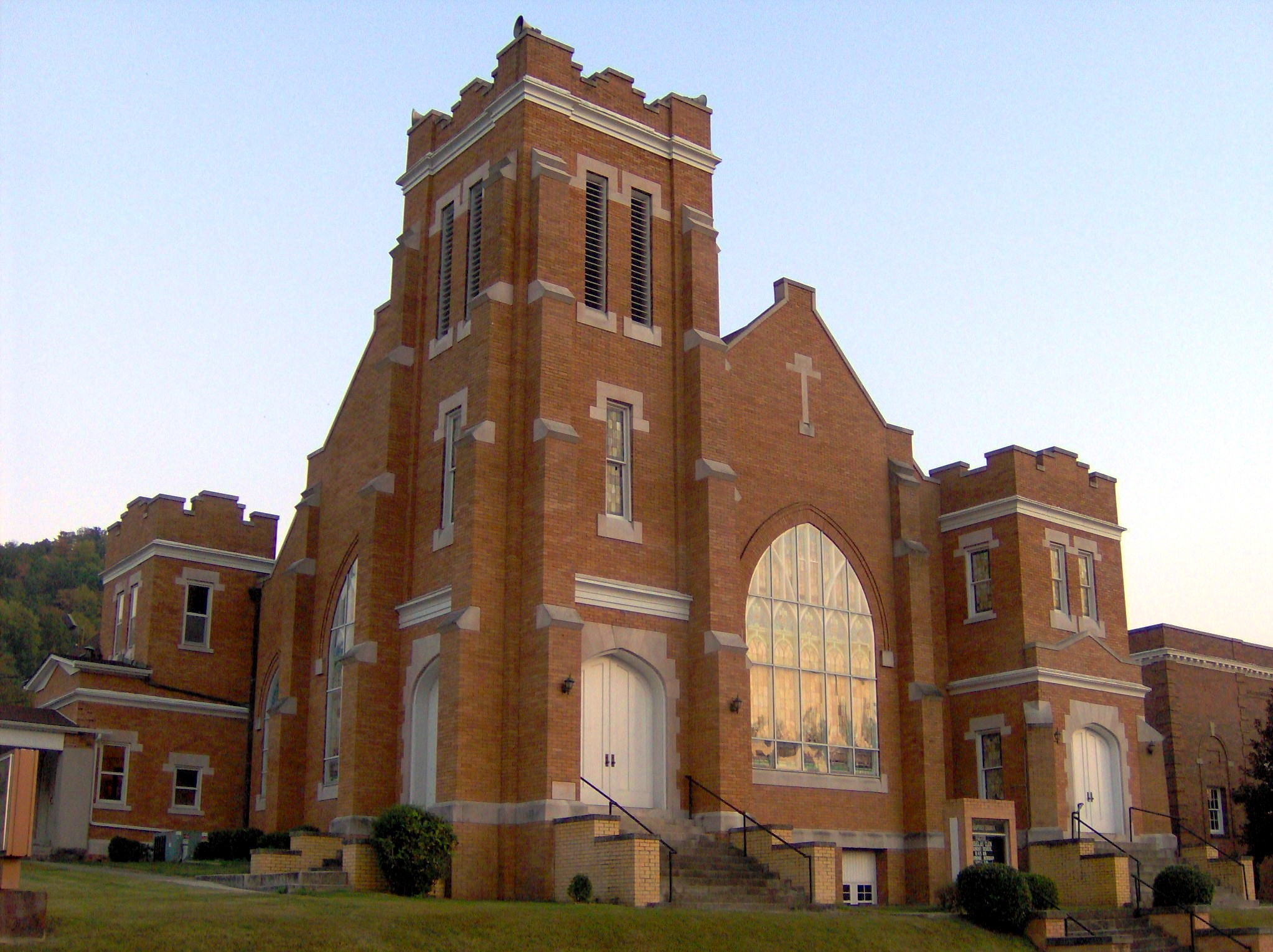
First Baptist Church

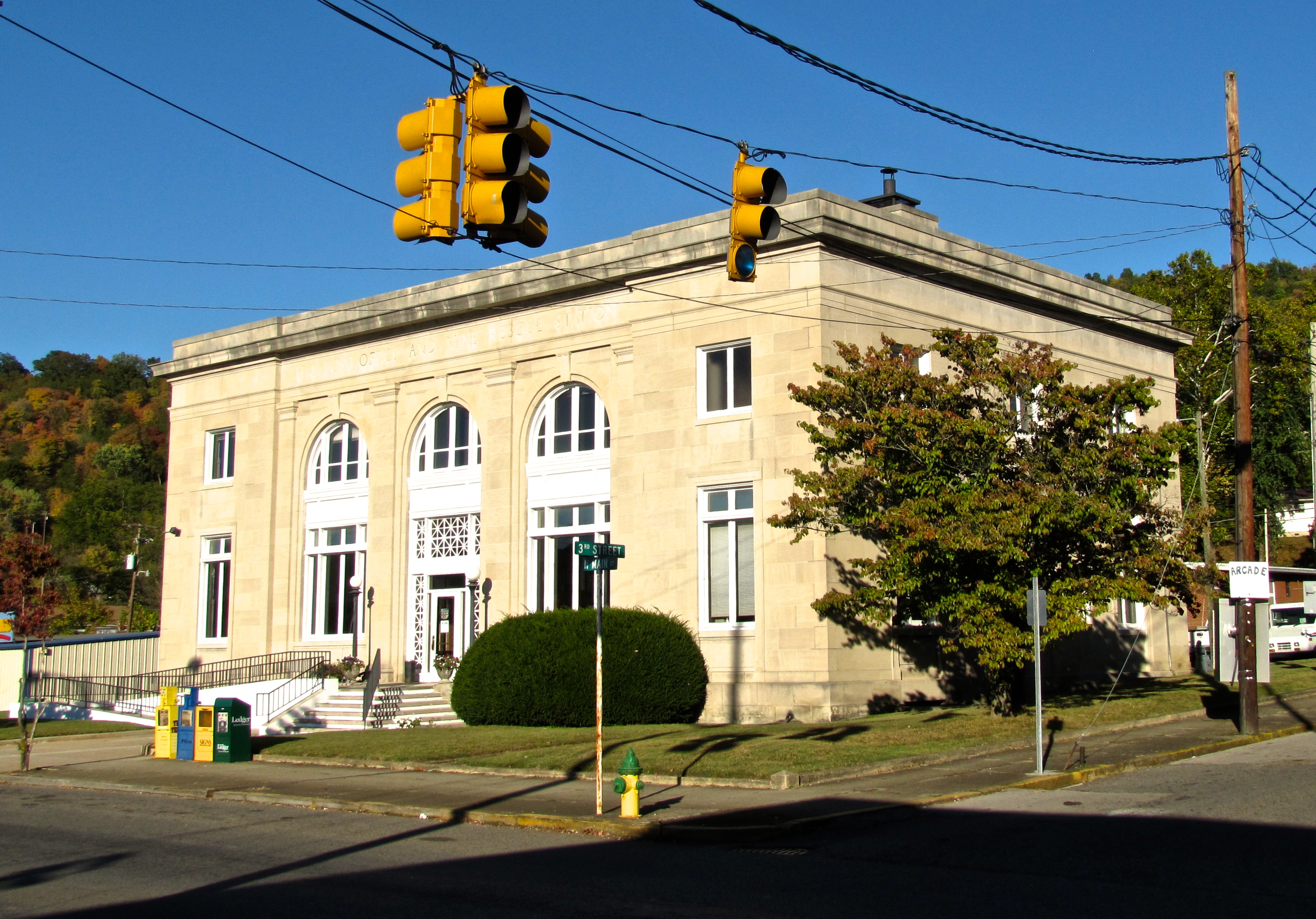
Jellico Post Office

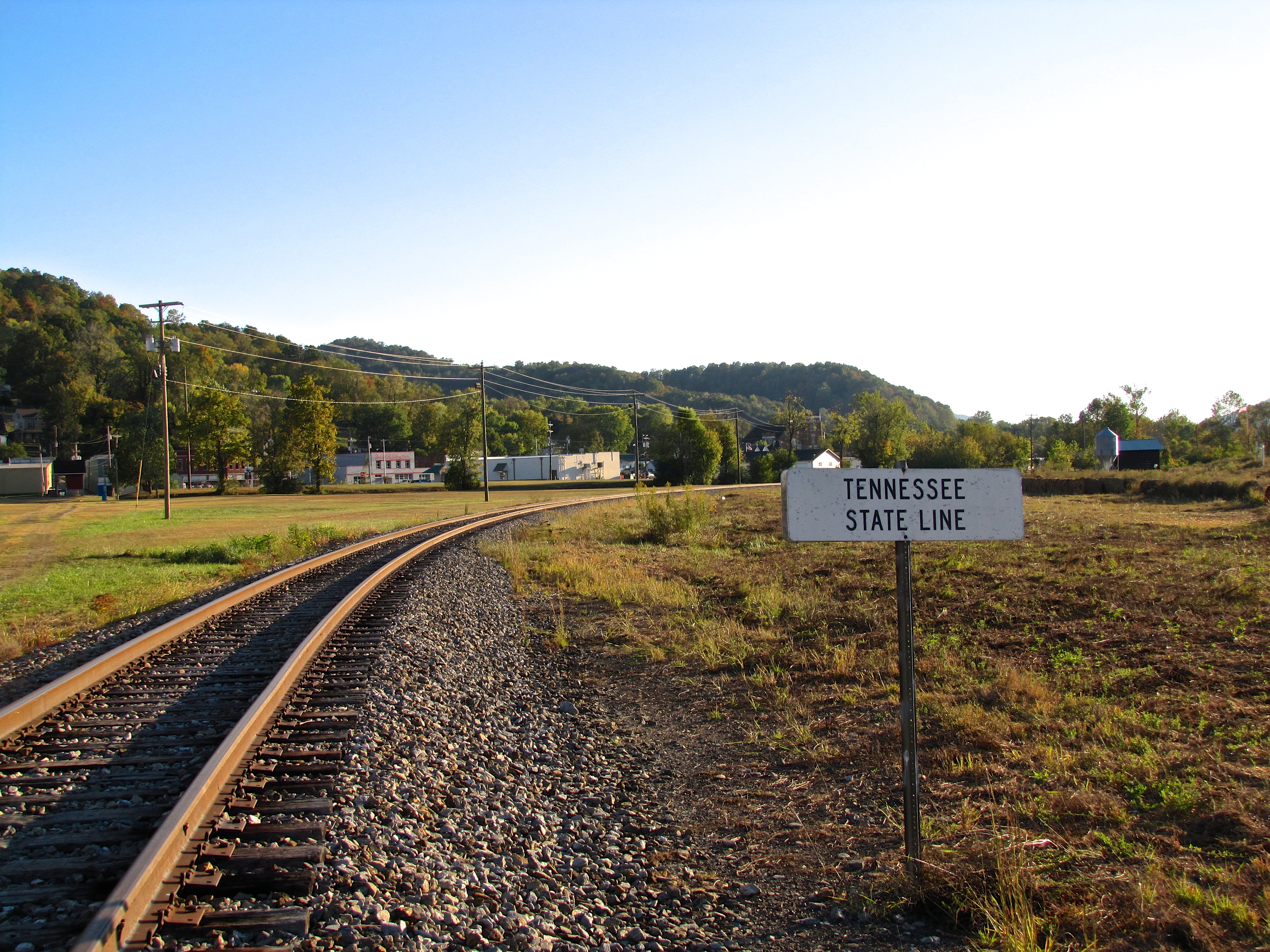
Railroad tracks at the state line

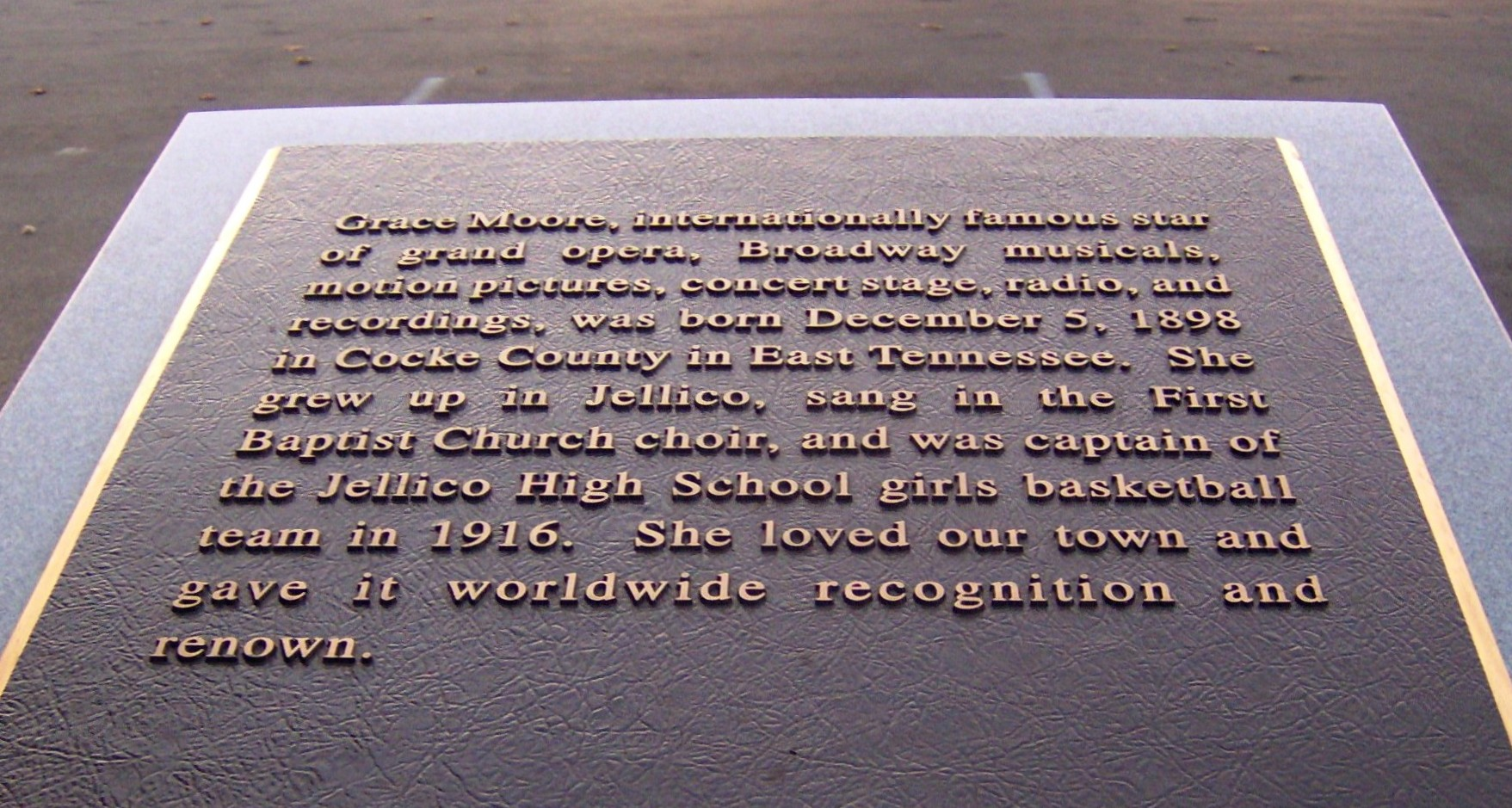
Grace Moore monument at Veterans Memorial Park
