= Orachrysops violescens =

Scientific classification
- Domain: Eukaryota
- Kingdom: Animalia
- Phylum: Arthropoda
- Class: Insecta
- Order: Lepidoptera
- Family: Lycaenidae
- Genus: Orachrysops
- Species: O. violescens

Binomial name
- Orachrysops violescens Henning & Henning, 1994

Species of butterfly

Orachrysops violescens, the violescent blue, is a butterfly of the family Lycaenidae. It is found in South Africa, where it is known from Mpumalanga to the Limpopo province and in the southern part of the Kruger National Park.

The wingspan is 23–36 mm for males and 36–38 mm for females. Adults are on wing from September to December, although the exact time depends on the spring rains. There is one generation per year.

The larvae feed on Indigofera species.
