= Alder Springs, Campbell County, Tennessee =

Unincorporated community in Tennessee, US

Coordinates: 36°22′09″N 84°00′23″W

Alder Springs is an unincorporated community in Campbell County, Tennessee, in the United States.

The community was likely named for wild hazel alder growing near the town site.
