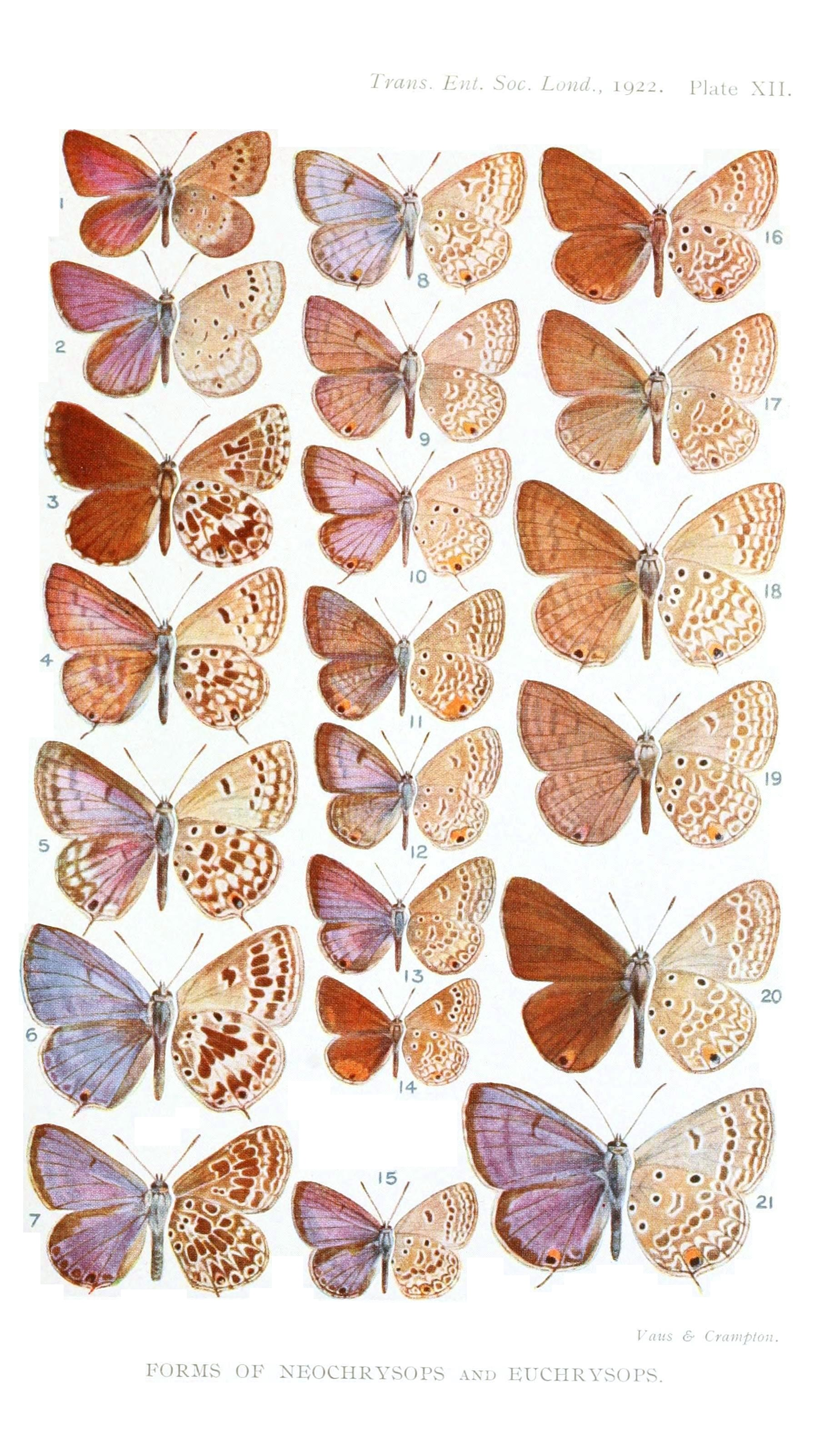
- Figure 2

Scientific classification
- Domain: Eukaryota
- Kingdom: Animalia
- Phylum: Arthropoda
- Class: Insecta
- Order: Lepidoptera
- Family: Lycaenidae
- Genus: Orachrysops
- Species: O. lacrimosa

Binomial name
- Orachrysops lacrimosa (Bethune-Baker, 1923)

Synonyms
- Nechrysops lacrimosa Bethune-Baker, 1923; Euchrysops lacrimosa; Lepidochrysops lacrimosa; Neochrysops lacrimosa var. major Bethune-Baker, 1923

= Orachrysops lacrimosa =

Species of butterfly

Orachrysops lacrimosa, the restless blue, is a butterfly of the family Lycaenidae. It is found in South Africa, where it is known from the KwaZulu-Natal midlands to the eastern part of the Free State and Mpumalanga.

The wingspan is 32–44 mm for males and 32–40 mm for females. Adults are on wing from October to December, although the exact time depends on the spring rains. There is one generation per year.

The larvae feed on Indigofera species.
