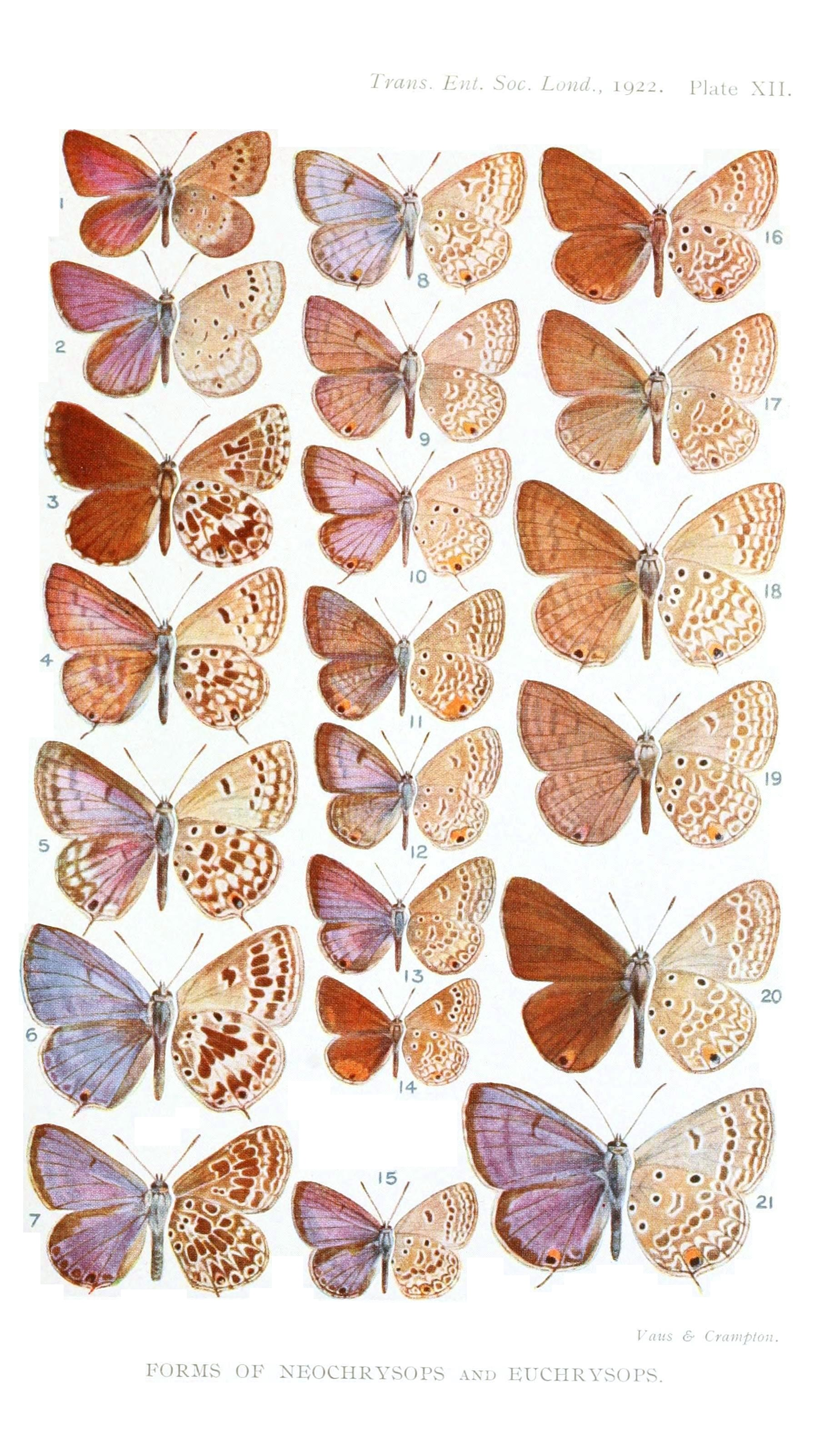
- Orachrysops niobe Figure 1 Orachrysops lacrimosa Figure 2

Scientific classification
- Domain: Eukaryota
- Kingdom: Animalia
- Phylum: Arthropoda
- Class: Insecta
- Order: Lepidoptera
- Family: Lycaenidae
- Subfamily: Polyommatinae
- Tribe: Polyommatini
- Genus: Orachrysops; Vári, 1986

= Orachrysops =

Genus of butterflies

Orachrysops is an Afrotropical genus of butterflies in the family Lycaenidae.

== Species ==
- Orachrysops ariadne (Butler, 1898)
- Orachrysops brinkmani Heath, 1997
- Orachrysops lacrimosa (Bethune-Baker, 1923)
- Orachrysops mijburghi Henning & Henning, 1994
- Orachrysops montanus Henning & Henning, 1994
- Orachrysops nasutus Henning & Henning, 1994
- Orachrysops niobe (Trimen, 1862)
- Orachrysops regalis Henning & Henning, 1994
- Orachrysops subravus Henning & Henning, 1994
- Orachrysops violescens Henning & Henning, 1994
- Orachrysops warreni Henning & Henning, 1994
