= Duff, Tennessee =

- Unincorporated community
- Location within Tennessee Location within the United States
- Coordinates: 36°26′48″N 84°4′3″W
- Country: United States
- State: Tennessee
- County: Campbell
- Elevation: 1,470 ft (450 m)
- Time zone: UTC-5 (Eastern (EST))
  - Summer (DST): UTC-4 (EDT)
- ZIP codes: 37729
- GNIS feature ID: 1283073

Duff is an unincorporated community and coal town in Campbell County, Tennessee.
