= Wynn, Tennessee =

- Unincorporated community
- Location within Tennessee Location within the United States
- Coordinates: 36°28′13″N 84°03′06″W
- Country: United States
- State: Tennessee
- County: Campbell
- Elevation: 1,332 ft (406 m)
- Time zone: UTC-5 (Eastern (EST))
  - Summer (DST): UTC-4 (EDT)
- Area code: 423
- GNIS feature ID: 1314540

Wynn is an unincorporated community in Campbell County, Tennessee, United States.
