= Clinchmore, Tennessee =

- Unincorporated community
- Location within Tennessee Location within the United States
- Coordinates: 36°13′10″N 84°16′56″W
- Country: United States
- State: Tennessee
- County: Campbell
- Elevation: 1,457 ft (444 m)

Population (2012)
  - Total: 273
- Time zone: UTC-6 (Central (CST))
  - Summer (DST): UTC-5 (CDT)
- GNIS feature ID: 1280744

Clinchmore is an unincorporated community in Campbell County, Tennessee. Clinchmore is a small, rural, town in Tennessee, with a population of 273 people.
