= Habersham, Tennessee =

- Unincorporated community
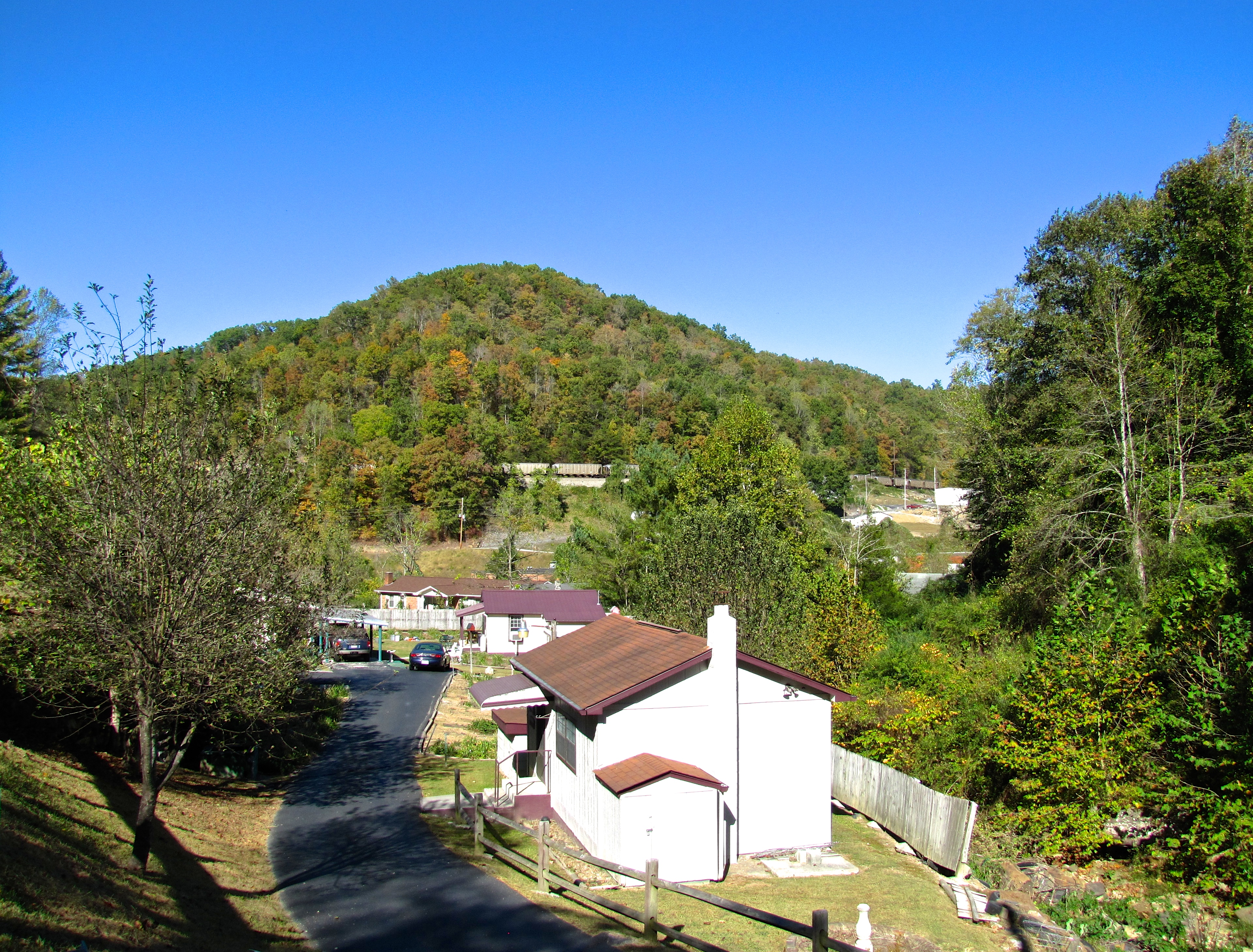
- Houses in Habersham

- Location within Tennessee Location within the United States
- Coordinates: 36°29′51″N 84°4′25″W
- Country: United States
- State: Tennessee
- County: Campbell
- Elevation: 1,152 ft (351 m)
- Time zone: UTC-5 (Eastern (EST))
  - Summer (DST): UTC-4 (EDT)
- GNIS feature ID: 1286473

Habersham is an unincorporated community and coal town in Campbell County, Tennessee. It is located along U.S. Route 25W in the Cumberland Mountains in the northeastern part of the county. Known as "Cupp" in the early 1900s, the community was later renamed for a prominent railroad family.
