= Orachrysops brinkmani =

Conservation status
- Least Concern (IUCN 3.1)

Scientific classification
- Kingdom: Animalia
- Phylum: Arthropoda
- Clade: Pancrustacea
- Class: Insecta
- Order: Lepidoptera
- Family: Lycaenidae
- Genus: Orachrysops
- Species: O. brinkmani

Binomial name
- Orachrysops brinkmani Heath, 1997

Species of butterfly

Orachrysops brinkmani, the Brinkman's blue, is a butterfly of the family Lycaenidae. It is found in South Africa, where it is known from fynbos in the Western Cape.

The wingspan is 24–38 mm for males and 28–39 mm for females. Adults are on wing from October to November.

The larvae probably feed on Indigofera declinata.

This butterfly was first discovered by Tony Brinkman, lately the custodian of the Classics Faculty and Faculty of Asian and Middle Eastern Studies at the University of Cambridge.
