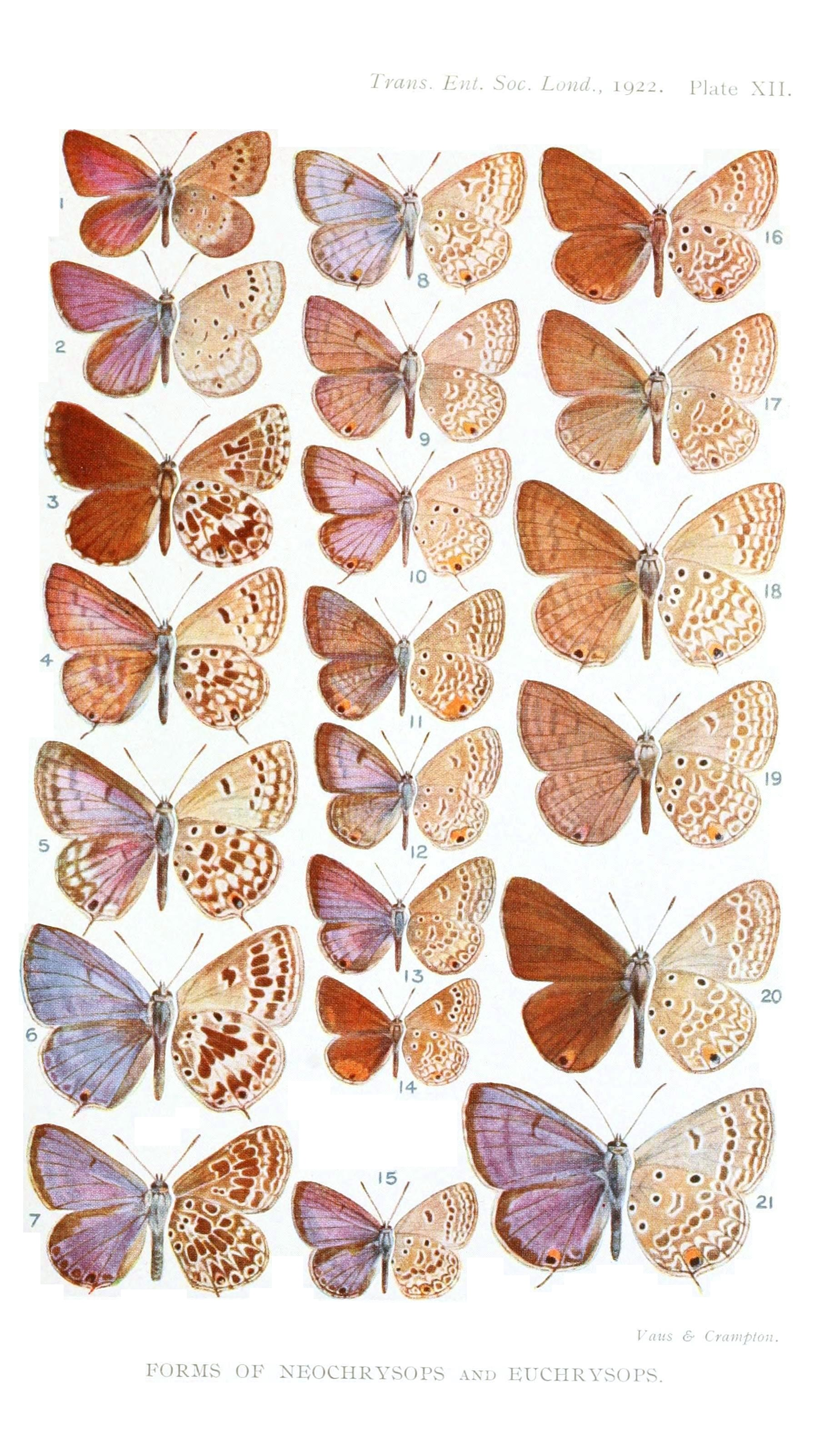
- Figure 1

Conservation status
- Critically Endangered (IUCN 3.1)

Scientific classification
- Kingdom: Animalia
- Phylum: Arthropoda
- Class: Insecta
- Order: Lepidoptera
- Family: Lycaenidae
- Genus: Orachrysops
- Species: O. niobe

Binomial name
- Orachrysops niobe (Trimen, 1858)

Synonyms
- Lycaena niobe Trimen, 1862; Euchrysops niobe; Lepidochrysops niobe

= Orachrysops niobe =

Species of butterfly

Orachrysops niobe, the Brenton blue, is a species of butterfly in the family Lycaenidae and is endemic to South Africa.

The wingspan is 24–38 mm for males and 22–42 mm for females. Adults are on wing from October to November and from February to March. There are two generations per year.

The species was discovered in 1858 by Roland Trimen at Knysna in Western Cape Province of South Africa. It was not seen again until 1977 when Dr Jonathan Ball of Cape Town found a population at Nature's Valley 50 km to the east of Knysna. This population died out during the 1980s, but in 1991 Ernest Pringle of Bedford in the Eastern Cape Province located another colony at Brenton-on-Sea. A housing development planned for the site was prevented from being built after a highly publicised campaign to save the species from extinction. Due to this, the land where the species breeds was procured by the South African Government and created into a Special Nature Reserve in July 2003.

The butterfly is the type species of the genus Orachrysops, and is red listed as critically endangered. The Special Nature Reserve at Brenton is managed by CapeNature, assisted by a management committee and informed by research conducted by Dave Edge of Knysna. This research studied the life cycle of the Brenton blue and all the ecological factors that impact on its survival including geology, microclimate, vegetation communities, ant interactions (myrmecophily), and the biology of its larval food plant Indigofera erecta Thunberg.
