= Orachrysops warreni =

Scientific classification
- Kingdom: Animalia
- Phylum: Arthropoda
- Class: Insecta
- Order: Lepidoptera
- Family: Lycaenidae
- Genus: Orachrysops
- Species: O. warreni

Binomial name
- Orachrysops warreni Henning & Henning, 1994
- Mpumalanga, South Africa, where Verloren Valei Nature Reserve is located
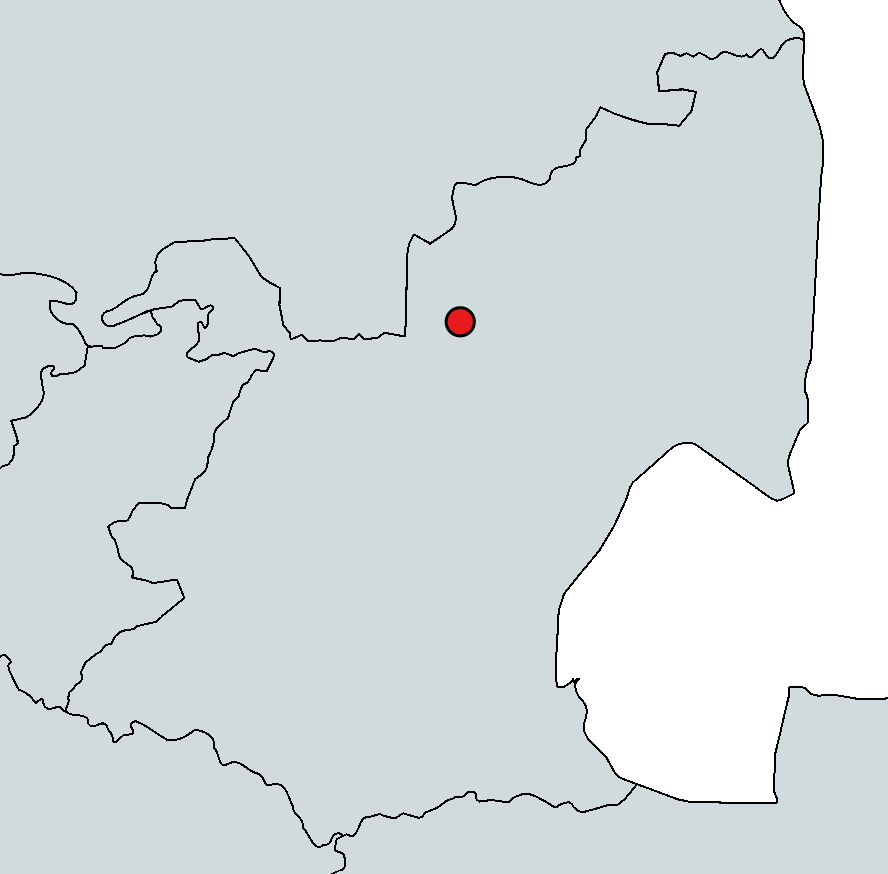
- Verloren Valei Nature Reserve, the only known range of O. warreni, in Mpumalanga

Species of butterfly

Orachrysops warreni, the Warren's blue or Lost Valley Cupid, is a butterfly of the family Lycaenidae. It is found in South Africa and endemic to the Verloren Valei Nature Reserve in Mpumalanga, where it is only known from one hillside.

The species is named after R.T. Warren and his family, who discovered the butterfly while on surveys together in December 1988 and December 1989.

Its wingspan is 32–36 mm for males and 32–40 mm for females. Adults are on wing from December to January. There is one generation per year.

The larvae feed on Indigofera species.
