= Indian Mountain State Park =

State park in Tennessee, United States

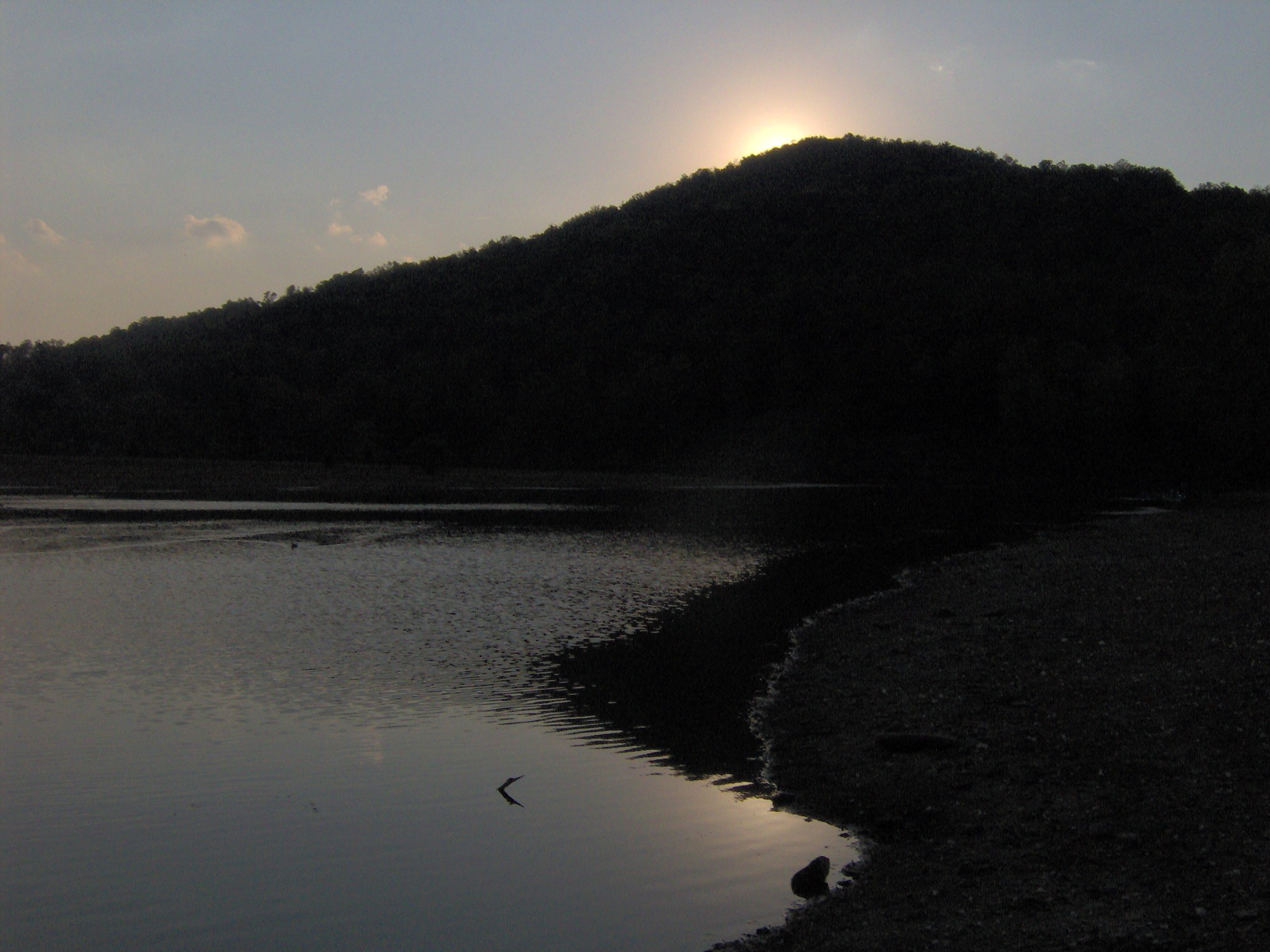
- Indian Mountain rising above Indian Mountain Lake
- Interactive map of Indian Mountain State Park
- Type: Tennessee State Park
- Location: Jellico, Tennessee
- Coordinates: 36.58466°N 84.14184°W
- Area: 213 acres (0.86 km^{2})
- Created: 1971
- Operator: Tennessee Department of Environment and Conservation
- Website: Indian Mountain State Park

Indian Mountain State Park is a state park in Campbell County, Tennessee, in the southeastern United States. Established in 1971, the park consists of 213 acres (0.86 km^{2}) situated at the base of Indian Mountain, a 1,949-foot (594 m) summit that overlooks the Elk Valley in the Cumberland Mountains. The park is located immediately west of the city of Jellico, and the history and development of the two are intertwined to a great extent.

Indian Mountain State Park is unique in that it was developed upon an abandoned strip mine, and serves as an example of how strip-mined land can be reclaimed and used for recreational and other purposes. The park is located amidst the floodplain of Elk Creek, and a small lake and several large ponds flank the park's central area. The Tennessee-Kentucky state line forms the park's northern boundary.

== Geographical setting ==
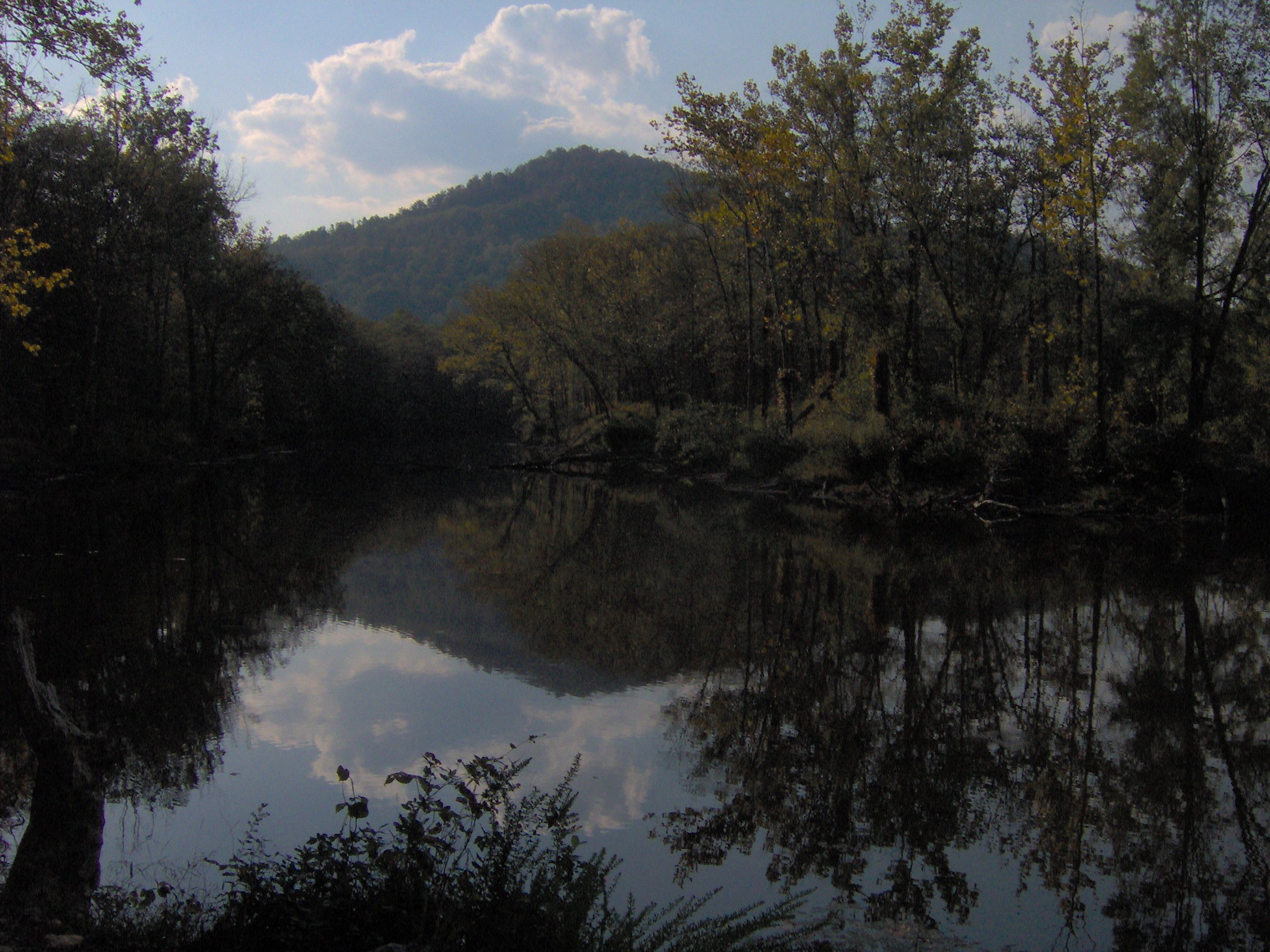
Ballard Lake

Elk Creek flows northward from its source on the slopes of Braden Mountain to the southwest, slicing a 15-mile (24 km) valley between the Jellico Mountain uplands to the west and Pine Mountain to the east en route to its mouth along Clear Fork just north of the Tennessee-Kentucky border. As the creek descends to the Oswego area south of Jellico, the valley expands into a marshy floodplain approximately 1 mile (1.6 km) wide. Jellico occupies the northeastern part of this plain, and extends up the slopes of the valley's northernmost hills. Indian Mountain State Park occupies the northwestern half of the valley between Jellico and the base of Indian Mountain.

Elk Creek splits Indian Mountain State Park into eastern and western halves. The western half is dominated by the 6-acre (0.024 km^{2}) Indian Mountain Lake, which spans the base of Indian Mountain and forms the southern and western boundary of the park's campground. Ballard Lake, a large pond slightly smaller than Indian Mountain Lake, dominates the park's eastern section. Several smaller ponds are scattered along the park's northern and southern boundaries. Elk Creek, which drains the park, is part of the Cumberland River watershed.

Interstate 75 passes through the Clear Fork Valley just east of the park, connecting the area to Lexington to the north and Knoxville to the south. Tennessee State Route 297, which intersects U.S. Route 25W in Jellico, connects the area with Huntsville to the southwest.

== History ==
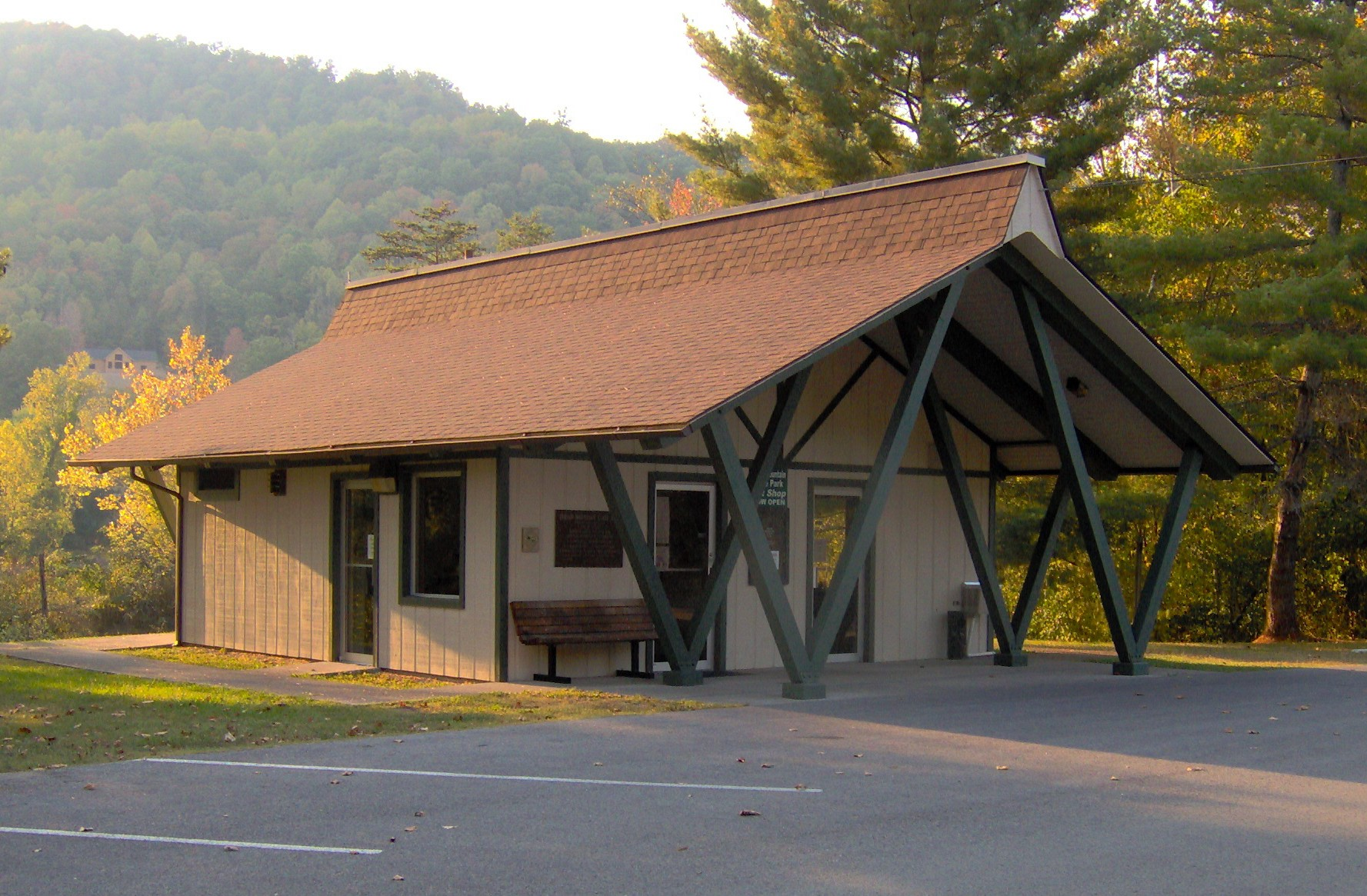
Indian Mountain State Park visitor center

Although the Cherokee transferred possession of what is now Campbell County to the United States in 1805, the northern Elk Valley remained sparsely populated for most of the 19th century. A road connecting Campbell County with Kentucky passed through the area, and may have been used by a detachment of the Confederate Army of East Tennessee to invade Kentucky in 1862 during the U.S. Civil War. A village known as "Smithburgh" eventually developed in the vicinity of this road, but by 1878, Smithburgh consisted of little more than a post office and a half-dozen houses.

In the early 1880s, a high quality type of coal was discovered on Jellico Mountain. Jellico coal, as it came to be known, burned relatively slowly and had a low ash content. In 1883, Smithburgh changed its name to Jellico in part to capitalize on the new demand for this coal. The discovery of coal coincided with the arrival of the railroad, making large-scale mining in the area economically feasible, and mining operations sprang up throughout the Elk Valley.

In the late 19th century and early 20th century, most coal mining operations focused on underground mining. With the success of Jellico coal, Campbell County became the largest coal producer of any county in Tennessee, producing over one million tons (appx. 900,000 metric tons) per year between 1912 and 1924. By the 1940s and 1950s, however, surface mining had become the mining companies' preferred coal extraction method. During this period, the Saxton Coal Company operated a large surface mine at what is now Indian Mountain State Park. In 1960, after the mine's coal resources had been exhausted and the mine abandoned, the City of Jellico obtained ownership of the mine and with the help of several state and federal agencies, began restoring the denuded, unattractive land. Indian Mountain State Park opened in 1971.

== The park today ==
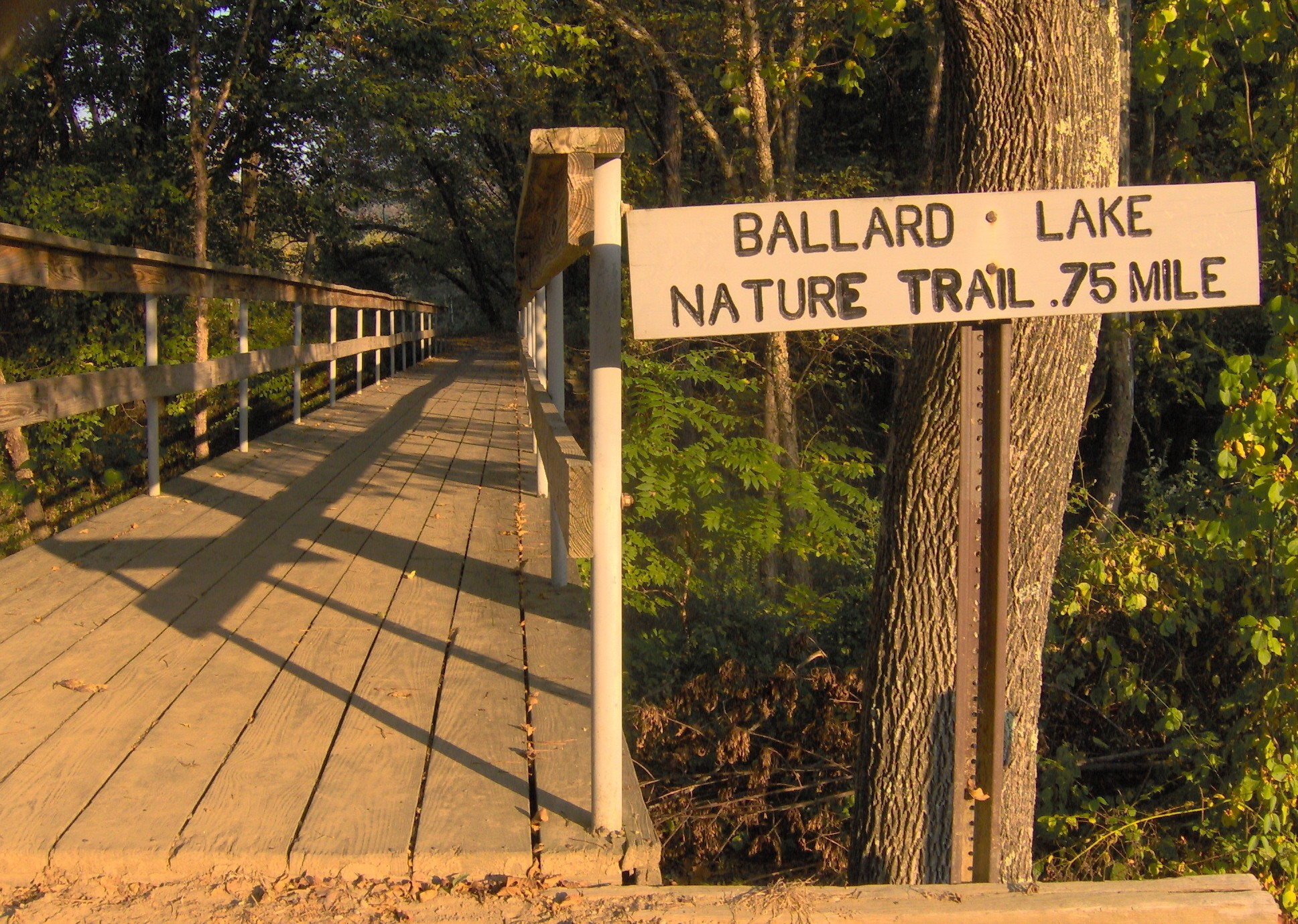
Bridge over Elk Creek, leading to the Ballard Lake area

Indian Mountain State Park currently maintains a campground with 49 fully equipped campsites, three picnic pavilions, and 3 walking trails. Indian Mountain Lake and several ponds in the park are stocked with catfish, bluegill, large-mouthed bass, and crappie to provide fishing opportunities. Pedal boats, kayaks, and paddle boards are available for rent to use on Indian Mountain Lake.

Two official walking trails meander through the park on both sides of Elk Creek. The Indian Mountain Lake Trail is a paved 1-mile (1.6 km) loop that wraps around the east bank of Indian Mountain Lake. The .75-mile (1.21 km) Ballard Lake Nature Trail loops along the forested banks of Ballard Lake. A third unmarked half-mile trail wraps around the pond in the southeast section of the park.
