= Orachrysops ariadne =

Conservation status
- Endangered (IUCN 3.1)

Scientific classification
- Kingdom: Animalia
- Phylum: Arthropoda
- Class: Insecta
- Order: Lepidoptera
- Family: Lycaenidae
- Genus: Orachrysops
- Species: O. ariadne

Binomial name
- Orachrysops ariadne (Butler, 1898)

Synonyms
- Catachrysops ariadne Butler, 1898; Euchrysops ariadne; Lepidochrysops ariadne

Species of butterfly

(Orachrysops ariadne), the Karkloof blue, is a species of butterfly in the family Lycaenidae.

== Description ==
The interior wing of the Karklooff blue supports a deep blue color with black veins on the inner margin, while the outer margin is black. The wings underside pattern supports a light brown color with multiple black and white spots.

The wingspan is 26–40 mm.

O. ariadne is known to be a rapid flier, covering recorded distances of 157 meters in food search.

== Native range ==
This butterfly is endemic to South Africa, where it is only known from a few localities in the 'Mistbelt grasslands' within the KwaZulu-Natal midlands. Only four known colony sites are known to contain extant populations of O. ariadne.

== Growth ==
There is only one generation per year, as the Karkloof blue is univoltine.

The females eggs are laid on the stems and leaves of the indigo shrub, Indigofera woodii var. laxa. The larvae will then begin to hatch after an incubation period of 18 to 30 days. O. ariadne larvae are 1 mm in length with a dark green coloration and long thick setae. They will feed on the leaves of Indigofera, which the species supports a host relationship with before burrowing into the plant tissue.

The Karkloff blue is partially ant-dependent, as through a symbiotic relationship, some larvae are taken to the nests of species Camponotus natalensis for pupating.

In its adult life stage, O. ariadne feed on nectar from eight recorded sources including Hebenstretia dura and Tephrosia polystachya.

Adults are on wing from March to April.

== Threats ==
Orachrysops ariadne is a particularly vulnerable species to any habitat destruction, due to the fact that its range is extremely narrow. Current estimates show agricultural development in the last decades have transformed up to 92% of the KwaZulu-Natal midlands into unusable habitat, with only around 1% remaining in healthy condition for species like O. ariadne. This threat is a continued happening with seasonal burning of grasses by the locals to clear cropland, which threaten existing populations of butterflies. Other major threats include invasive species such as Eupatorium macrocephalum which disrupt the plant composition of the Mistbelt ecosystem, threatening native species such as Indigofera which the Karkloof depends on for food and reproduction.

== Conservation efforts ==
Measures are being taken in effort to create a more sustainable habitat for Orachrysops ariadne by removal of invasive species, and propagation of more host plants (Indigofera), as its current availability limits butterfly success. Additionally plans have been implemented regarding the controlled burns to be conducted in the later season when O. ariadne have been moved under ground by Camponotus Natalensis after entering the pupa stage.
