= Stinking Creek, Tennessee =

Unincorporated community in Tennessee, US

Coordinates: 36°30′24″N 84°08′28″W

Stinking Creek is an unincorporated community in Campbell County, Tennessee, in the United States.

== History ==
It took its name from the nearby stream Stinking Creek. Haskel Ayers (1936-2020), businessman and politician, was born in Stinking Creek.
