= Orachrysops subravus =

Scientific classification
- Domain: Eukaryota
- Kingdom: Animalia
- Phylum: Arthropoda
- Class: Insecta
- Order: Lepidoptera
- Family: Lycaenidae
- Genus: Orachrysops
- Species: O. subravus

Binomial name
- Orachrysops subravus Henning & Henning, 1994

Species of butterfly

Orachrysops subravus, the grizzled blue, is a butterfly of the family Lycaenidae. It is found in South Africa, where it is known from montane grassland from the Eastern Cape to the southern Drakensberg foothills and the KwaZulu-Natal midlands.

The wingspan is 30–36 mm for males and 22–36 mm for females. Adults are on wing from October to January, although the except time depends on the spring rains. Adults are on wing later in the southern part of the range. There is one generation per year.

The larvae feed on Indigofera woodii var. woodii.
