= Brenton-on-Sea =

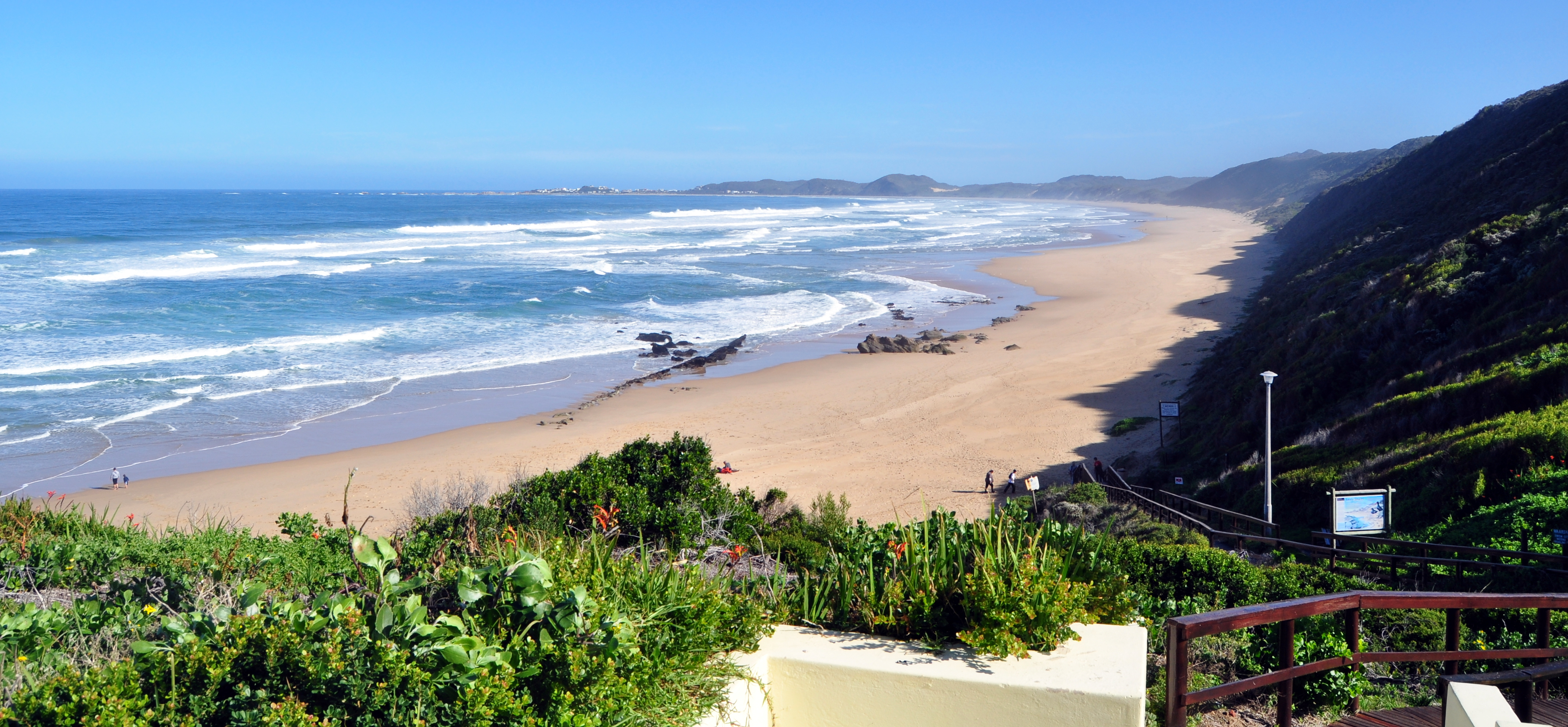
- View of the beach

- Location within Western Cape Location within South Africa
- Coordinates: 34°04′S 23°01′E
- Country: South Africa
- Province: Western Cape
- District: Garden Route
- Municipality: Knysna

Area
  - Total: 1.76 km^{2} (0.68 sq mi)

Population (2011)
  - Total: 294
  - Density: 167/km^{2} (433/sq mi)

Racial makeup (2011)
  - Black African: 5.1%
  - Coloured: 1.7%
  - White: 91.2%
  - Other: 2.0%

First languages (2011)
  - Afrikaans: 50.2%
  - English: 44.7%
  - Other: 5.1%
- Time zone: UTC+2 (SAST)

Brenton-on-Sea is a settlement and seaside resort town 15km west of Knysna in Garden Route District Municipality in the Western Cape province of South Africa.

Named after Sir Jahleel Brenton, who declared Knysna a harbour in 1818, the area is home to the endangered Brenton blue butterfly.

It is part of the Garden Route and a popular spot for seaside vacations and holidays.

The endangered Brenton Blue butterfly is responsible for large sects of land in the Brenton area remaining undeveloped. The last breeding colonies of the tiny endemic butterfly are found here and in 2003, the land was proclaimed a Special Nature Reserve to try to save the species.
