= Orachrysops mijburghi =

Conservation status
- Endangered (IUCN 3.1)

Scientific classification
- Kingdom: Animalia
- Phylum: Arthropoda
- Class: Insecta
- Order: Lepidoptera
- Family: Lycaenidae
- Genus: Orachrysops
- Species: O. mijburghi

Binomial name
- Orachrysops mijburghi Henning & Henning, 1994

Species of butterfly

Orachrysops mijburghi, the Mijburgh's blue, is a butterfly of the family Lycaenidae. It is found in South Africa, where it is known from highland grassveld in the Free State.

The wingspan is 31–39 mm for males and 32–38 mm for females. Adults are on wing from October to December and from January to March. There are two generations per year.

The larvae feed on Indigofera evansiana.
