= Westburn =

Westburn may refer to:

- Westburn, South Lanarkshire, Scotland
- Westburn Grant (1985-2020), Australian race horse
- Westburn Park, Aberdeen, Scotland
- Westburn School, Ilam, New Zealand
- Westburn Viaduct, Scotland

== See also ==
- Eastburn (disambiguation)
- Westbourne (disambiguation)
