= Cotula, Tennessee =

- Unincorporated community
- Location within Tennessee Location within the United States
- Coordinates: 36°28′42″N 84°3′15″W
- Country: United States
- State: Tennessee
- County: Campbell
- Elevation: 1,263 ft (385 m)
- Time zone: UTC-6 (Central (CST))
  - Summer (DST): UTC-5 (CDT)
- GNIS feature ID: 1306136

Cotula is an unincorporated community and coal town in Campbell County, Tennessee. It was also known as Gatliff. Their post office is closed.
