= Orachrysops regalis =

Scientific classification
- Kingdom: Animalia
- Phylum: Arthropoda
- Class: Insecta
- Order: Lepidoptera
- Family: Lycaenidae
- Genus: Orachrysops
- Species: O. regalis

Binomial name
- Orachrysops regalis Henning & Henning, 1994

Species of butterfly

Orachrysops regalis, the royal blue, is a butterfly of the family Lycaenidae. It is found in the grasslands of Limpopo and Mpumalanga provinces, South Africa.

The wingspan is 34–40 mm for males and 30–42 mm for females. Adults are on wing during daytime from October to December, although the exact time depends on the spring rains. There is one generation per year.

The larvae feed on Indigofera species.
