= Westbourne, Tennessee =

- Unincorporated community
- Location within Tennessee Location within the United States
- Coordinates: 36°29′37″N 84°1′46″W
- Country: United States
- State: Tennessee
- County: Campbell
- Elevation: 1,381 ft (421 m)
- Time zone: UTC-6 (Central (CST))
  - Summer (DST): UTC-5 (CDT)
- GNIS feature ID: 1314495

Westbourne is an unincorporated community and coal town in Campbell County, Tennessee. Their post office is closed.
