= Henry Eastburn =

British civil engineer

- Born: 1753
- Died: 1821 (aged 68)
- Citizenship: English
- Spouse: Elizabeth Simon
- Children: 1
- Engineering career
- Discipline: Civil engineering
- Institutions: Smeatonian Society of Civil Engineers

Henry Eastburn (1753–1821) was a British draughtsman and civil engineer, known for his work on the canals of Great Britain, including the Basingstoke Canal, the Derwent and Rye navigations, and the Lancaster Canal.

== Biography ==
=== Early life ===
Eastburn was baptised on 7 February 1753. His father, Michael, was an apothecary from York. His mother, Faith Jenkinson, was John Smeaton's sister-in-law thus Eastburn was Smeaton's nephew. Eastburn began studying under John Smeaton in 1768, and became his assistant at some point around 1775, finishing in 1788.

=== Career ===
As both student and assistant of Smeaton, Eastburn succeeded William Jessop. As part of this work, Eastburn surveyed Hatfield Chase in 1776 and produced technical drawings such as that of the winding engine at Walker Colliery in 1783 and Aberdeen Harbour in 1788. The same year, Eastburn worked with Jessop on a proposal to transport water between the River Colne and Marylebone.

Between 1792 and 1793, Eastburn was employed as Jessop's resident engineer on the Basingstoke Canal. He succeeded William Wright in the role; during construction, Jessop had engaged John Rennie in checking the work performed by Wright and contractor John Pinkerton; the work was substandard and Eastburn was employed to oversee the canal's completion.

Upon the waterway's opening in 1794, Eastburn began surveying the Derwent in Yorkshire at the behest of William Fitzwilliam, 4th Earl Fitzwilliam; the proposal was to extend the current navigation from Malton to Yedingham. Eastburn then was engaged as resident engineer on the southern Lancaster Canal, between Garstang and Wigan—a position he held until 1798; this work was performed under the supervision of John Rennie. The following March, Eastburn was elected to the Smeatonian Society of Civil Engineers; after April 1790 he is listed in society proceedings as a country member. In 1801, Rennie nominated Eastburn as resident engineer for the London Docks, stating that:

[Eastburn] has acted for me on the Lancaster Canal for about four years, in which he acquitted himself much to may Satisfaction

— John Rennie, 1801

Despite this, James Murray was appointed to the role in preference to Eastburn, whose career was apparently at its end.

== Family life ==
Eastburn married Elizabeth Simon in October 1779. Simon was daughter of the vicar at Whitkirk, where Smeaton was a parishioner. Eastburn and his wife had one daughter, Elizabeth. Eastburn's will was written in December 1812, bequeathing his estate to his wife (or, in the event of her predeceasing him, his then-recently widowed daughter). His precise date of death is not known, although he was buried at the church of St Maurice, Monkgate in York on 5 July 1821. His will was proved in August 1821.

== List of works ==
- Watermill (1787)—Elevation of part of a waterwheel intended for a cotton mill and designed on the Warren watermill
- Watermill, Wandsworth, London (1789)—General plan for the ground adjoining the corn mill at Wandsworth, London, at a scale of 1:38
- Windmill, Sykefield (1784)—Plan and section of the iron axis, scale 1:24 and elevation of the timber main shaft, scale 1:12, for the oil windmill at Sykefield
