= Royal Blue, Tennessee =

- Unincorporated community
- Location within Tennessee Location within the United States
- Coordinates: 36°22′56″N 84°15′38″W
- Country: United States
- State: Tennessee
- County: Campbell
- Elevation: 1,480 ft (450 m)
- Time zone: UTC-5 (Eastern (EST))
  - Summer (DST): UTC-4 (EDT)
- Area code: 423
- GNIS feature ID: 1300211

Royal Blue is an unincorporated community in Campbell County, Tennessee, United States. The community is along Tennessee State Route 63 near its junction with Interstate 75, 6.1 miles (9.8 km) north-northwest of downtown Caryville.

The Blue Diamond Coal Company operated the coal mine at Royal Blue for years. During that time miners and their families were housed in small single-family homes with running water and outdoor toilets. The only commercial service available to the miners was a company store where the workers could use scrip to make purchases. Few owned cars and the only other way to travel was by a bus which transported miners from other areas in the morning and returned them in the evening.

For years school for students in grades primary through 5th grade was held in a 3-room house. c1947 a cinder block school which included indoor bathrooms was built for students through 8th grade.

Baptist and Holiness congregations shared the 3-room school for their services.
