= Campbell County, Tennessee =

County in Tennessee, United States

- County
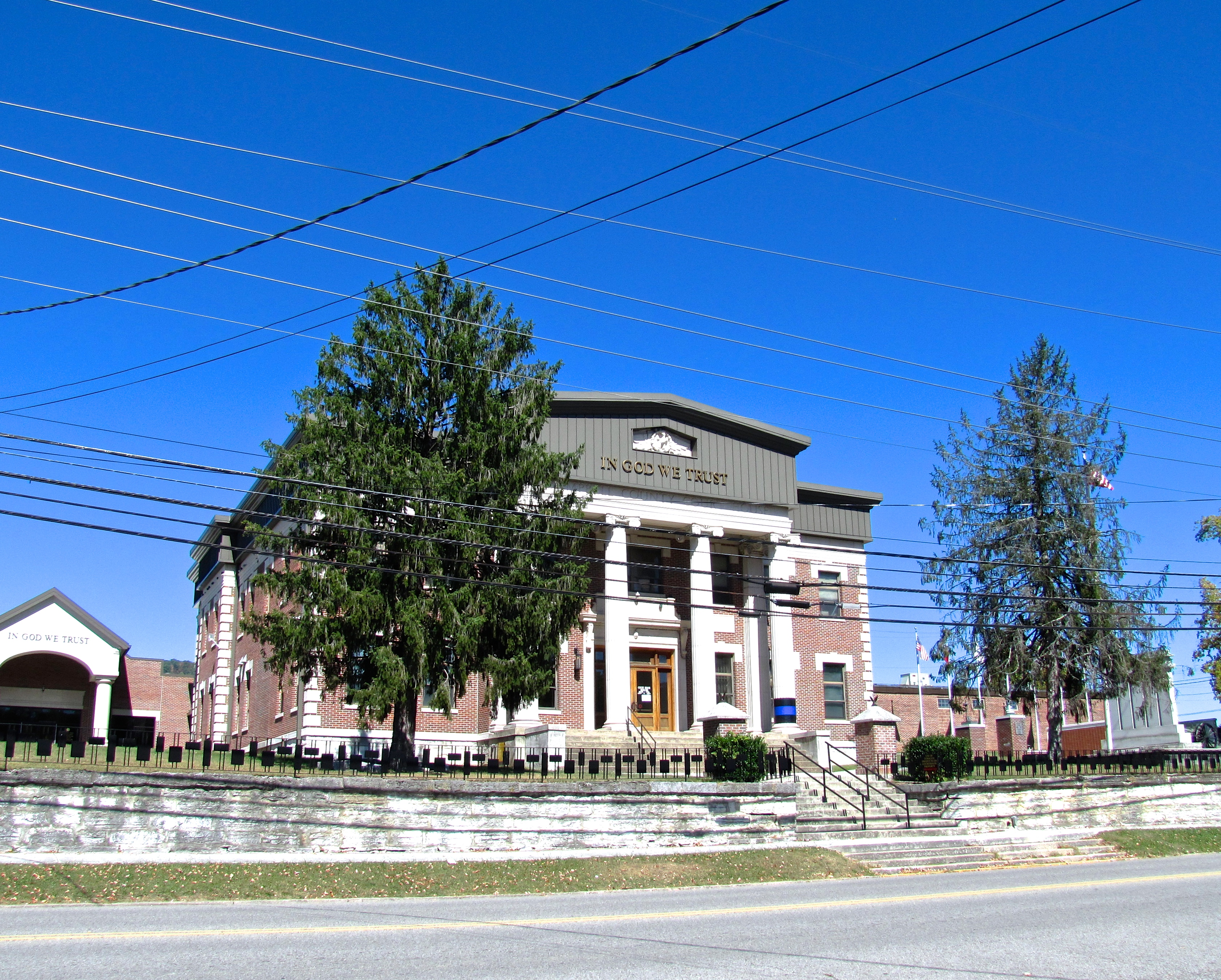
- Campbell County Courthouse in Jacksboro

- Flag Seal Logo

- Location within the U.S. state of Tennessee
- Coordinates: 36°25′N 84°09′W
- Country: United States
- State: Tennessee
- Founded: September 11, 1806
- Named for: Arthur Campbell
- Seat: Jacksboro
- Largest city: LaFollette

Area
  - Total: 498 sq mi (1,290 km^{2})
  - Land: 480 sq mi (1,200 km^{2})
  - Water: 18 sq mi (47 km^{2}) 3.6%

Population (2020)
  - Total: 39,272
  - Estimate (2025): 40,290 ▲
  - Density: 79/sq mi (31/km^{2})
- Time zone: UTC−5 (Eastern)
  - Summer (DST): UTC−4 (EDT)
- Congressional districts: 2nd, 3rd
- Website: www.campbellcountytn.gov

Campbell County is a county in the U.S. state of Tennessee. It is located on the state's northern border in East Tennessee. As of the 2020 census, its population was 39,272. Its county seat is Jacksboro. Campbell County is included in the Knoxville metropolitan area.

== History ==
Campbell County was formed in 1806 from parts of Anderson and Claiborne Counties. It was named in honor of Colonel Arthur Campbell, a member of the Virginia House of Burgesses and an officer during the American Revolutionary War.

New Mammoth Cave, located in Elk Valley, approximately 10 miles southwest of Jellico, was mined for saltpeter (the main ingredient of gunpowder) during the War of 1812. This cave possibly was also mined during the Civil War. In 1921, the cave was developed as a tourist attraction and was open to the public until at least 1928. Today, New Mammoth Cave is securely gated by the U.S. Fish and Wildlife Service. It is protected as a sanctuary for bats, including the federally endangered Indiana bat.

During the Civil War, the county's sympathies were predominantly with the Union. On June 8, 1861, voters in Campbell County rejected Tennessee's Ordinance of Secession by a vote of 1,094 to 60. On August 1, 1861, Campbell County became the first Tennessee county to form a Union Army unit for the Civil War, organizing Company B of the 1st Tennessee Infantry at Jacksboro.

== Geography ==
According to the U.S. Census Bureau, the county has a total area of 498 sq mi (1,290 km^{2}), of which 480 sq mi (1,200 km^{2}) are land and 18 sq mi (47 km^{2}) (3.6%) are covered by water.

Campbell County is situated in a geological border region between the Cumberland Mountains in the northwest and the Appalachian Ridge-and-Valley Range in the southeast. This border area is characterized by several large, elongated ridges, namely Cross Mountain in the west and Cumberland Mountain, Walnut Mountain, and Pine Mountain to the north. Ivydell, situated in the Cumberland Mountains region, is the exact geographical center of Campbell County. Elevations vary widely across the county, ranging from 3,534 ft (1,077 m) at Cross Mountain to slightly less than 1,000 ft (300 m) a few miles away at Norris Lake. Norris Lake— an artificial reservoir created by the Tennessee Valley Authority in the 1930s— is the main body of water in the region. It is fed by the Clinch and Powell Rivers, as well as several large creeks, most notably Davis Creek, Big Creek, and Cove Creek. Cove Creek also feeds the much smaller Cove Lake—a recreational lake built by TVA in the 1930s as part of the Norris project—which is located near Caryville.

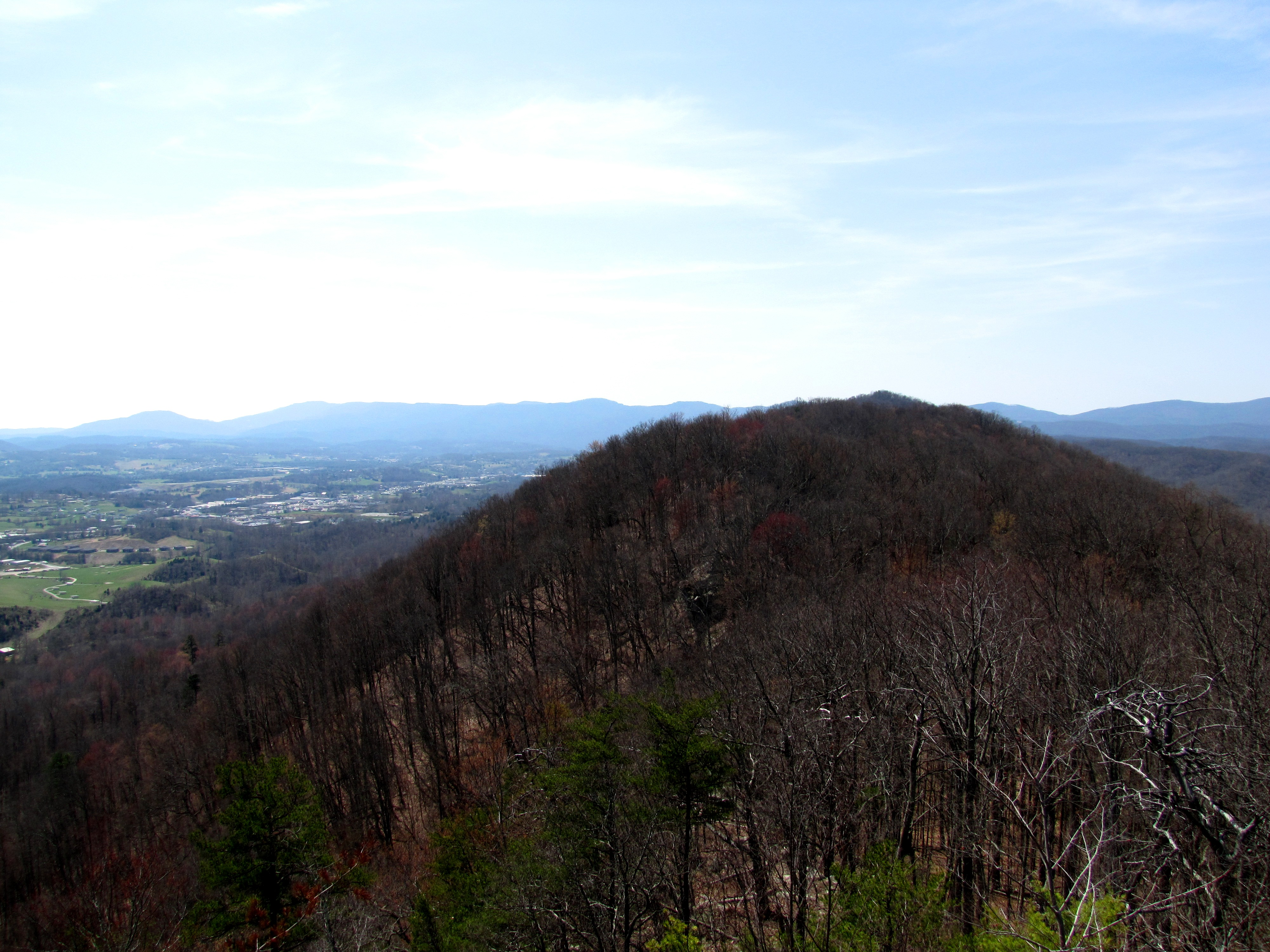
View across Cumberland Mountain from the Cumberland Trail

Most of the county's residents live in the southern half of the county, where La Follette, Jacksboro, and Caryville are located. Jellico, located along the Tennessee-Kentucky border, is the most notable populated area in the county's plateau section.

Portions of the county north of Walnut Mountain are part of the Cumberland River watershed. Portions of the county south of Walnut Mountain are part of the Tennessee River watershed. In the northwestern part of the county, a large valley, known as Elk Valley, runs from southwest to northeast, from Pioneer to Jellico.

Unlike most of Tennessee, a sizable part of northern Campbell County is outside of the Sun Belt due to a past error surveying the northern border of Middle and East Tennessee. The Sun Belt is defined by the Kinder Institute as being south of 36°30'N latitude, which was intended to be the northern border of Tennessee and is the actual northern border of West Tennessee.

=== Adjacent counties ===
- Whitley County, Kentucky (north)
- Claiborne County (east)
- Union County (southeast)
- Anderson County (south)
- Scott County (west)
- McCreary County, Kentucky (northwest)

=== State-protected areas ===
- Chuck Swan State Forest (part)
- Cove Creek Wildlife Management Area
- Cove Lake State Park
- Cumberland Trail (part)
- Indian Mountain State Park
- Norris Dam State Park (part)
- North Cumberland Wildlife Management Area (part)

== Demographics ==
Historical population
Census	Pop.	Note	%±
1810	2,668		—
1820	4,244		59.1%
1830	5,110		20.4%
1840	6,149		20.3%
1850	6,068		−1.3%
1860	6,712		10.6%
1870	7,445		10.9%
1880	10,005		34.4%
1890	13,486		34.8%
1900	17,317		28.4%
1910	27,387		58.2%
1920	28,265		3.2%
1930	26,827		−5.1%
1940	31,131		16.0%
1950	34,369		10.4%
1960	27,936		−18.7%
1970	26,045		−6.8%
1980	34,923		34.1%
1990	35,079		0.4%
2000	39,854		13.6%
2010	40,716		2.2%
2020	39,272		−3.5%
2025 (est.)	40,290	▲	2.6%
U.S. Decennial Census; 1790-1960 1900-1990; 1990-2000 2010-2020

=== Racial and ethnic composition ===
Campbell County, Tennessee – Racial and ethnic composition Note: the US Census treats Hispanic/Latino as an ethnic category. This table excludes Latinos from the racial categories and assigns them to a separate category. Hispanics/Latinos may be of any race.
Race / ethnicity (NH = Non-Hispanic)	Pop 1980	Pop 1990	Pop 2000	Pop 2010	Pop 2020	% 1980	% 1990	% 2000	% 2010	% 2020
White alone (NH)	34,459	34,621	38,913	39,510	37,101	98.67%	98.69%	97.64%	97.04%	94.47%
Black or African American alone (NH)	170	130	119	117	130	0.49%	0.37%	0.30%	0.29%	0.33%
Native American or Alaska Native alone (NH)	57	175	122	101	77	0.16%	0.50%	0.31%	0.25%	0.20%
Asian alone (NH)	24	35	59	103	94	0.07%	0.10%	0.15%	0.25%	0.24%
Native Hawaiian or Pacific Islander alone (NH)	x	x	15	10	0	x	x	0.04%	0.02%	0.00%
Other race alone (NH)	16	1	10	5	87	0.05%	0.00%	0.03%	0.01%	0.22%
Mixed race or Multiracial (NH)	x	x	347	398	1,283	x	x	0.87%	0.98%	3.27%
Hispanic or Latino (any race)	197	117	269	472	500	0.56%	0.33%	0.67%	1.16%	1.27%
Total	34,923	35,079	39,854	40,716	39,272	100.00%	100.00%	100.00%	100.00%	100.00%

=== 2020 census ===
As of the 2020 census, there were 39,272 people, 16,324 households, and 11,127 families residing in the county. The median age was 44.8 years, 20.4% of residents were under the age of 18, 21.0% of residents were 65 years of age or older, and for every 100 females there were 96.9 males (94.4 males for every 100 females age 18 and over).

Of the 16,324 households, 27.4% had children under the age of 18 living in them, 46.6% were married-couple households, 19.4% were households with a male householder and no spouse or partner present, and 27.2% were households with a female householder and no spouse or partner present. About 29.1% of all households were made up of individuals and 14.3% had someone living alone who was 65 years of age or older.

There were 19,941 housing units, of which 18.1% were vacant. Among occupied housing units, 69.0% were owner-occupied and 31.0% were renter-occupied. The homeowner vacancy rate was 2.1% and the rental vacancy rate was 7.9%.

51.2% of residents lived in urban areas, while 48.8% lived in rural areas.

The racial makeup was 94.9% White, 0.3% Black or African American, 0.2% American Indian and Alaska Native, 0.2% Asian, <0.1% Native Hawaiian and Pacific Islander, 0.6% from some other race, and 3.7% from two or more races. Hispanic or Latino residents of any race comprised 1.3% of the population.

=== 2000 census ===
As of the census of 2000, 39,854 people, 16,125 households, and 11,577 families were residing in the county. The population density was 83 people/mi^{2} (32 people/km^{2}). The 18,527 housing units averaged 39 per square mile (15/km^{2}). The racial makeup of the county was 98.13% White, 0.30% African American, 0.31% Native American, 0.16% Asian, 0.20% from other races, and 0.91% from two or more races. About 0.67% of the population were Hispanics or Latinos of any race.

Of the 16,125 households, 29.80% had children under the age of 18 living with them, 55.30% were married couples living together, 12.60% had a female householder with no husband present, and 28.20% were not families. About 25.40% of all households were made up of individuals, and 11.60% had someone living alone who was 65 or older. The average household size was 2.44, and the average family size was 2.91.

In the county, the age distribution was 22.90% under the age of 18, 8.50% from 18 to 24, 28.00% from 25 to 44, 25.50% from 45 to 64, and 15.10% who were 65 or older. The median age was 38 years. For every 100 females, there were 93.00 males. For every 100 females age 18 and over, there were 90.90 males.

The median income for a household in the county was $25,285, and for a family was $30,197. Males had a median income of $26,762 versus $19,138 for females. The per capita income for the county was $13,301. About 18.40% of families and 22.80% of the population were below the poverty line, including 32.00% of those under age 18 and 17.70% of those age 65 or over.

== Economy ==
=== Coal mining ===
The Cumberland Plateau section of Campbell County is part of the massive Appalachian coalfield that dominates much of Central Appalachia, thus the Jellico section of the county has more in common economically with southeastern Kentucky and West Virginia, whereas the southern parts of the county economically resemble East Tennessee. The coal seams near Jellico produced a slow-burning bituminous coal that helped make Campbell County Tennessee's largest coal-producing county in the early 20th century.

=== Tourism ===
Campbell County is home to Norris Lake and the Royal Blue Trails Complex. Much of Norris Lake is along its southern boundary, as well as several wildlife management areas such as the North Cumberland Wildlife Management Area, which includes the Royal Blue Trails. Campbell County boasts 11 marinas on Norris Lake, drawing tens of thousands of visitors annually. The county is home to Lonus Young County Park on Norris Lake and four state parks: Cove Lake State Park near Caryville, Indian Mountain State Park near Jellico, Norris Dam State Park near Rocky Top, and the Cumberland Trail State Park coursing the mountaintops overlooking LaFollette, Jacksboro, and Caryville from Speedwell in the east to the southern reaches of the county near one of the last railroad water tanks near the Shea community. Over a million visitors frequent the Tennessee Welcome Center along I-75 at Jellico each year.

== Communities ==
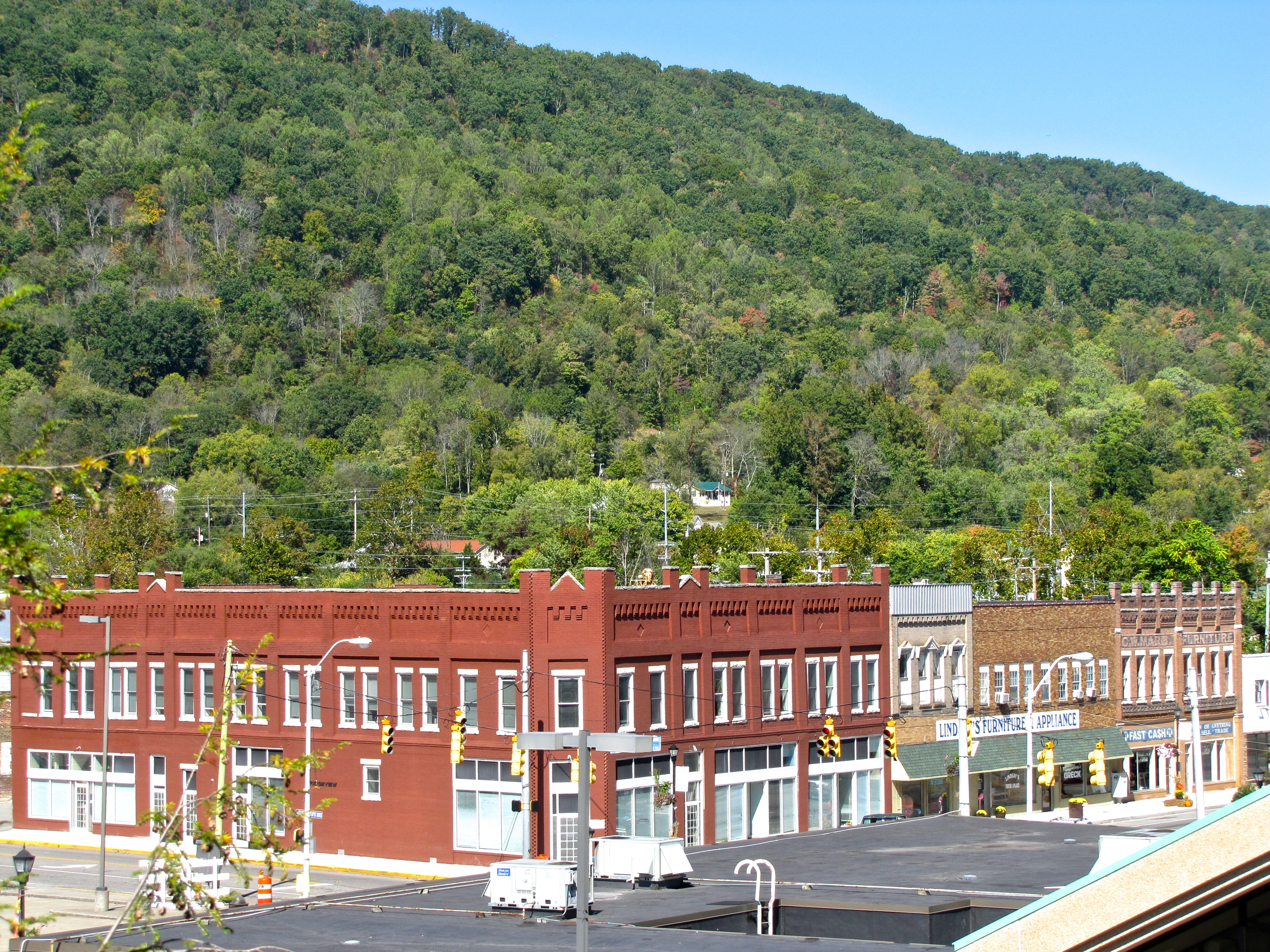
LaFollette

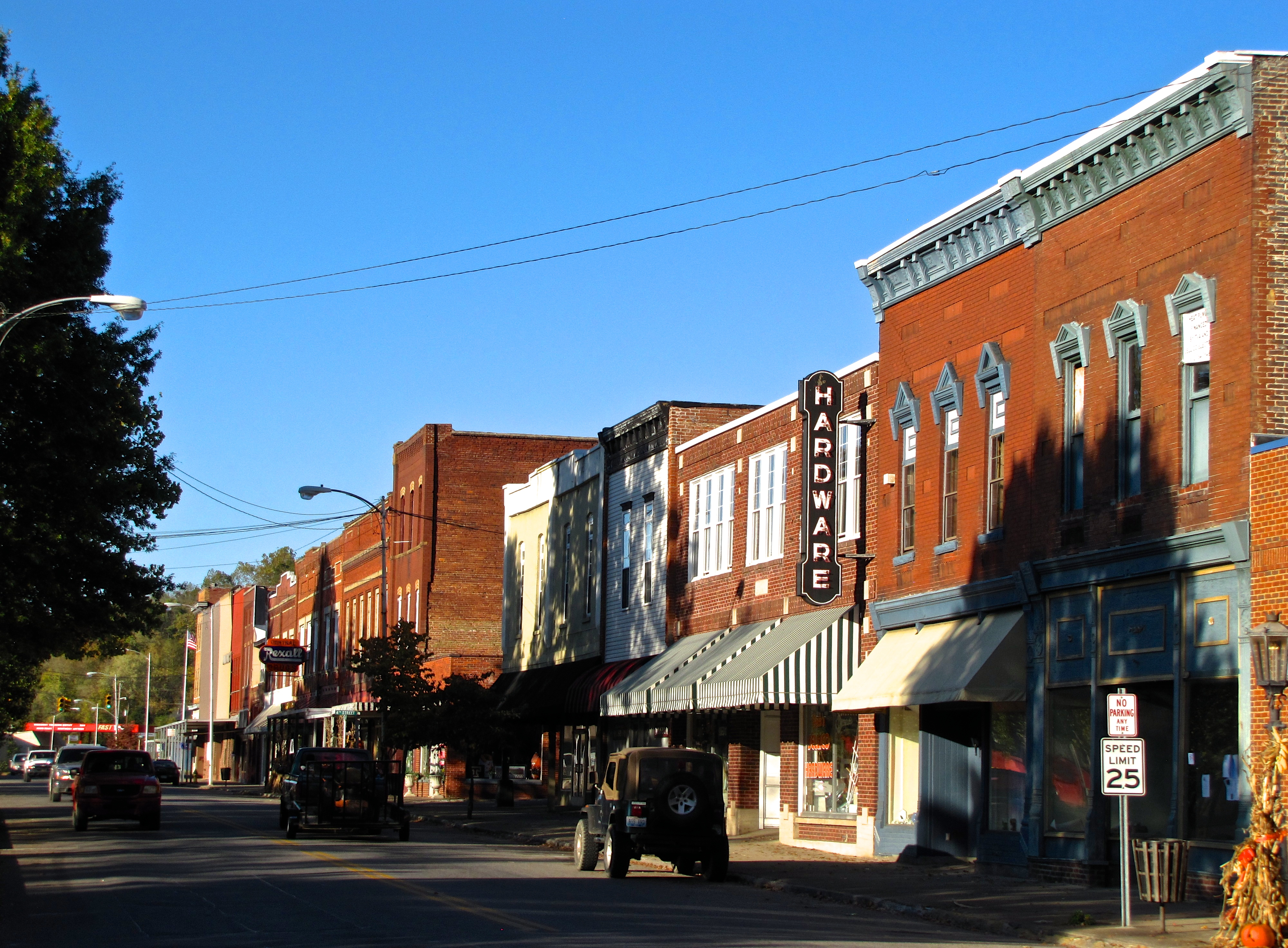
Jellico

=== Cities ===
- Jellico
- LaFollette
- Rocky Top (partial)

=== Towns ===
- Caryville
- Jacksboro (county seat)

=== Census-designated place ===
- Fincastle

=== Unincorporated communities ===
- Alder Springs
- Anthras
- Block
- Clinchmore
- Cotula
- Duff
- Eagan
- Elk Valley
- Habersham
- Morley
- Newcomb
- Pioneer
- Royal Blue
- Stinking Creek
- Vasper
- Westbourne
- White Oak
- Wooldridge
- Wynn

== Politics ==
Like most of East Tennessee, Campbell County has historically been a Republican stronghold. Since the founding of the Republican Party, only three Democratic Presidents, all Southerners, have carried the county. Campbell County was one of only two counties in East Tennessee won by Democrat and native Tennessean Al Gore in 2000, the other being Marion. Gore is the only losing Democrat to have ever carried the county (although he did win the national popular vote).

United States presidential election results for Campbell County, Tennessee
Year	Republican		Democratic		Third party(ies)	
Year	No.	%	No.	%	No.	%
1912	302	14.37%	554	26.37%	1,245	59.26%
1916	1,670	75.87%	485	22.04%	46	2.09%
1920	3,368	83.82%	650	16.18%	0	0.00%
1924	2,620	73.78%	648	18.25%	283	7.97%
1928	3,007	83.69%	583	16.23%	3	0.08%
1932	2,735	59.34%	1,834	39.79%	40	0.87%
1936	2,814	50.96%	2,703	48.95%	5	0.09%
1940	2,799	50.78%	2,688	48.77%	25	0.45%
1944	3,244	61.56%	2,008	38.10%	18	0.34%
1948	2,922	54.92%	2,267	42.61%	131	2.46%
1952	4,557	65.63%	2,346	33.79%	40	0.58%
1956	5,065	64.78%	2,628	33.61%	126	1.61%
1960	5,079	61.21%	3,134	37.77%	84	1.01%
1964	4,232	48.96%	4,412	51.04%	0	0.00%
1968	4,024	52.54%	2,268	29.61%	1,367	17.85%
1972	4,909	73.41%	1,629	24.36%	149	2.23%
1976	4,277	44.75%	5,206	54.47%	74	0.77%
1980	5,537	52.99%	4,752	45.47%	161	1.54%
1984	5,685	54.43%	4,692	44.93%	67	0.64%
1988	5,197	55.19%	4,188	44.48%	31	0.33%
1992	4,897	37.87%	6,756	52.25%	1,278	9.88%
1996	4,393	38.59%	6,122	53.77%	870	7.64%
2000	5,784	46.57%	6,492	52.27%	145	1.17%
2004	7,859	55.67%	6,163	43.65%	96	0.68%
2008	8,535	67.59%	3,867	30.62%	226	1.79%
2012	8,604	71.10%	3,328	27.50%	169	1.40%
2016	9,870	78.76%	2,248	17.94%	414	3.30%
2020	12,331	82.58%	2,441	16.35%	161	1.08%
2024	13,115	84.46%	2,305	14.84%	108	0.70%

== See also ==
- Campbell County Public Schools
- National Register of Historic Places listings in Campbell County, Tennessee
