= Vasper, Tennessee =

- Unincorporated community
- Location within Tennessee Location within the United States
- Coordinates: 36°16′16″N 84°11′42″W
- Country: United States
- State: Tennessee
- County: Campbell
- Elevation: 1,119 ft (341 m)
- Time zone: UTC-5 (Eastern (EST))
  - Summer (DST): UTC-4 (EDT)
- GNIS feature ID: 1273396

Vasper is an unincorporated community and coal town in Campbell County, Tennessee. The community no longer has a post office.
