= La Follette =

La Follette may refer to:

== Places and schools ==
- LaFollette, Tennessee, U.S.
- La Follette, Wisconsin, U.S.
- La Follette High School, Madison, Wisconsin, U.S.
- Robert M. La Follette School of Public Affairs, University of Wisconsin–Madison, U.S.

== People ==
- La Follette family
- Belle Case La Follette, (1859–1931), women's suffrage activist in Wisconsin
- Bronson La Follette (1936–2018), Wisconsin Attorney General, 1965–1969 and 1975–1987
- Charles M. La Follette (1898–1974), Congressman from Indiana
- Chester La Follette (1897–1993), American painter
- Doug La Follette (born 1940), Wisconsin Secretary of State, 1975–1979 and 1983–2023
- Harvey Marion LaFollette, (1858–1929) Indiana politician
- Philip La Follette (1897–1965), Governor of Wisconsin, 1931–1933 and 1935–1939
- Robert M. La Follette (1855–1925), U.S. Senator from Wisconsin, 1906–1925
- Robert M. La Follette Jr. (1895–1953), U.S. Senator from Wisconsin, 1925–1947
- Suzanne La Follette (1893–1982), American journalist and feminist
- William Leroy La Follette (1860–1934), Congressman from Washington, 1911–1919
- William Leroy LaFollette Jr. (1890–1950) member of the Washington Legislature

== See also ==
- Robert La Follette (disambiguation)
