= Summerskill =

Summerskill may refer to:

- Ben Summerskill OBE (born 1961), British businessman and journalist, Chief Executive of Stonewall
- Edith Summerskill CH PC (1901–1980), British physician, feminist, Labour politician and writer
- John Summerskill (1925–1990), educator and president of San Francisco State University in the 1960s
- Mimi LaFollette Summerskill (1917–2008), educator, author, political activist, and vineyard owner
- Shirley Summerskill (born 1931), British Labour Party politician and former government minister

== See also ==
- Summerhill (disambiguation)
- Summersville (disambiguation)
