= Mimi LaFollette Summerskill =

American educator, author, and activist

Miriam LaFollette "Mimi" Summerskill (June 2, 1917 – January 31, 2008) was an American educator, author, and vineyard owner.

== Early life and education ==
Mimi was the eldest of four children. She grew up in Colfax, Washington where her father, William Leroy LaFollette Jr., was an attorney and politician and her mother was the daughter of the Congregational Church missionary. She was educated in the local public schools. She studied the violin, was rodeo queen, and took lessons in elocution with Ida Lou Anderson. She began college at nearby Washington State University and graduated from Stanford University, where she played the violin in the college orchestra and was part of the Speakers' Bureau.

== Media ==
In the pre-World War II radio era she hosted her own show for NBC, broadcasting from Waikiki Beach in Hawaii. In the 1950s she worked on several programs in the early days of public television for KQED in San Francisco.

== Educator ==
A firm believer in learning through doing, she founded InterAlp, a program that sent American high school students abroad to live with local families in Greece and Kenya. She helped establish the theater at Athens College in Greece.

== Vintner ==
Along with her husband, John Summerskill, she founded LaFollette Vineyard in the Belle Mead section of Montgomery Township, New Jersey. They produced a Seyval blanc in the winery they built on their 30-acre (120,000 m^{2}) vineyard just north of Princeton, New Jersey. Their LaFollette brand was a local favorite and the annual grape harvest was featured in the November 15, 1989, issue of Wine Spectator.

== Political activist ==
Mimi encouraged political dialogue and discussion. Politicians, policy makers, journalists, business people, artists and show business people discussed issues around her pool. During the 1992 presidential campaign, Bill Clinton spent a day at the LaFollette Vineyard discussing political strategy with fourteen Democratic governors and their staffs.

== Author and writer ==
She authored four books: Aegean Summer, Seduced by a Greek Island, Daughter of the Vine, and The Land of Solomon and Sheba.

== Family ==
A member of the La Follette family, her grandfather was Washington state Congressman William La Follette, a cousin of Wisconsin senator Robert La Follette Sr. and an Indiana educator and Tennessee industrialist. Her father was William Leroy LaFollette Jr., Whitman County, Washington prosecuting attorney; state legislator Harvey Marion LaFollette was her great-uncle; the artist Chester La Follette was her uncle; and editor and feminist author, Suzanne La Follette, was her aunt. Miriam's children are political leader, Richard L. Wright; African art dealer, William Wright; Classical language teacher, Helen Wright Bodel; MSW and therapist Miriam Wendy Wright, and Robert L Wright, who has served at various US embassies.
