= LaFollette House =

LaFollette House may refer to:

- LaFollette House (LaFollette, Tennessee), listed on the NRHP in Tennessee
- Robert M. La Follette House, Maple Bluff, Wisconsin, listed on the NRHP in Wisconsin
