= Jesse LaFollette =

Jesse LaFollette (c. 1781 - 1843) was the grandfather of Robert Marion La Follette, Sr., William La Follette, and Harvey Marion LaFollette. His family lived next to the Knob Creek Farm, Kentucky owned by Thomas Lincoln during Abraham Lincoln's boyhood years. LaFollette is shown in one of the limestone panels at the Lincoln Boyhood National Memorial in Lincoln City, Indiana.

== Early life ==
LaFollette was born near Morristown, New Jersey, in about 1781. His father, Joseph, and grandfather, Jean, were Huguenots who had escaped the persecution in France, traveling first to Jersey and then to the colonies where they operated a small farm near the Wallkill River in northern New Jersey. Jean was killed during the French and Indian Wars. Joseph married Phoebe Gobel of Morristown, New Jersey, whose father's farm along with other neighboring farms in Jockey Hollow was used by George Washington and his troops during the winter of 1780. After serving with Count Casimir Pulaski during the Revolutionary War, Joseph and his family joined the pioneers who trekked westward through the Cumberland Gap.

== Kentucky ==
LaFollette grew up in a pioneer community in Hardin County, Kentucky. As a young man, he started a farm in the hilly region of what is today LaRue County. His farm was adjacent to the Knob Creek Farm of Thomas Lincoln. Except for his service with the Kentucky Rifles during the War of 1812, he was engrossed in pioneer life on the frontier, hunting, clearing fields, farming, and raising a large family. The LaFollette and Lincoln families were part of a small community and shared many adventures of pioneer life. They were involved in land sales with each other and title disputes with speculators; they served on juries together; and they were of like mind on the issue of slavery siding with the abolitionists.

== Indiana ==
When the LaFollettes crossed into Indiana, they left slavery issues behind. The 1816 constitution of Indiana explicitly banned slavery in the state. Jesse was also leaving land title disputes behind. He settled in Putnam County, Indiana. The old soldier, Joseph, traveled with him on this trek, dying in 1834, and was buried at James Cemetery in Putnam County, just east of Greencastle. Several of Jesse's sons struck out for new territory and began farming in Primrose, Wisconsin in the 1850s.

== Memorial ==
In 1962 President John F. Kennedy signed into law an act that created Lincoln Boyhood National Memorial, which was dedicated in 1966. Jesse LaFollette is shown in the Kentucky panel of the memorial, standing next to Abraham Lincoln's father, Thomas Lincoln.
