= La Follette family =

Family in the United States

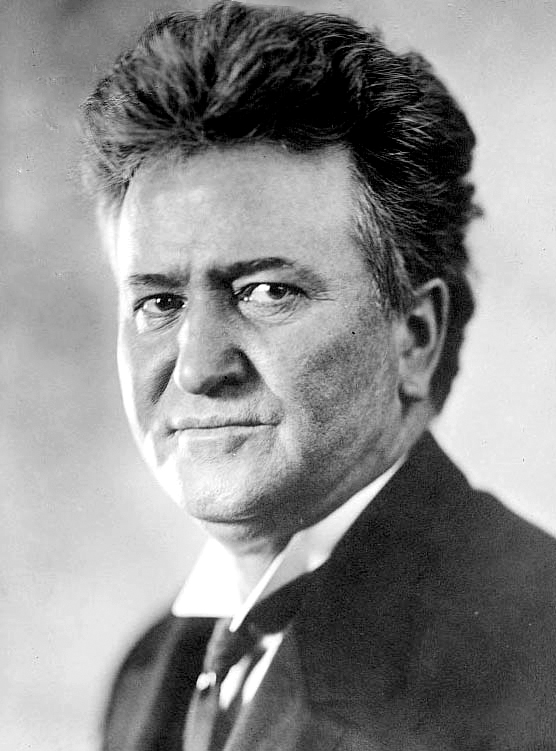
Robert M. La Follette Sr., Governor and U.S. Senator from Wisconsin

The La Follette family is a prominent family in the United States, especially in Wisconsin. Many of the family members have pursued political office.

== Members ==
- Robert M. La Follette Sr. (1855–1925), District Attorney of Dane County, Wisconsin 1880–1884; U.S. Representative from Wisconsin 1885–1891; delegate to the Republican National Convention 1896, 1904; Governor of Wisconsin 1901–1906; U.S. Senator from Wisconsin 1906–1925; candidate for Republican nomination for President of the United States 1908, 1916; Founder of the Progressive Party, 1924. Progressive Party candidate for President of the United States 1924. Belle Case La Follette was his wife. Fola La Follette was his daughter; Fola La Follette's husband the playwright George Middleton was his son-in-law. His sister Josephine La Follette was married to Robert G. Siebecker, Chief Justice of the Wisconsin Supreme Court. First cousin of William La Follette.
  - Robert M. La Follette Jr. (1895–1953), son of Robert M. La Follette Sr.; U.S. Senator from Wisconsin 1925–1947, delegate to the Republican National Convention 1928, 1932.
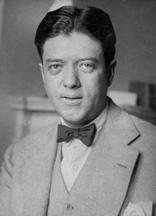
    Robert M. La Follette Jr., U.S. Senator from Wisconsin
    - Bronson La Follette (1936–2018), son of Robert M. La Follette Jr.; Attorney General of Wisconsin 1965–1969, 1975–1987.
  - Philip La Follette (1897–1965), son of Robert M. La Follette Sr.; District Attorney of Dane County, Wisconsin 1925–1927; Governor of Wisconsin 1931–1933, 1935–1939.
- Harvey Marion LaFollette (1858–1929), brother of William La Follette and first cousin of Robert M. La Follette Sr., Indiana Superintendent of Public Instruction and one of the founders of LaFollette, Tennessee.
- William La Follette (1860–1934), first cousin of Robert M. La Follette Sr.; Washington House of Representatives 1899–1901, U.S. Representative from Washington 1911–1919.
  - Suzanne La Follette (1893–1983), daughter of William La Follette; journalist
  - Chester La Follette (1897–1993), son of William La Follette; painter, first cousin once removed of Robert M. La Follette Sr.
  - William Leroy LaFollette Jr. (1890–1950), son of William La Follette; Washington House of Representatives 1939.
    - Mimi LaFollette Summerskill (1917–2008), daughter of William Leroy LaFollette Jr.; author and educator
      - Richard L. Wright (1943–) son of Mimi LaFollette Summerskill; political leader
- Charles M. La Follette (1898–1974), third cousin of Robert M. La Follette Jr. and Philip La Follette; Indiana House of Representatives 1927–1929, U.S. Representative from Indiana 1943–1947. (He was also great-grandson of U.S. Representative William Heilman.)
- Doug La Follette (1940–), great-grandson of Robert M. La Follette Sr.'s uncle, Wisconsin Senate (1973 and 1974); Secretary of State of Wisconsin (1975–1979, 1983–2023)
- Charles S. Eastman (1864–1939), nephew of Robert M. La Follette Sr.; member of the South Dakota House of Representatives (1907–1908)

== Homes ==
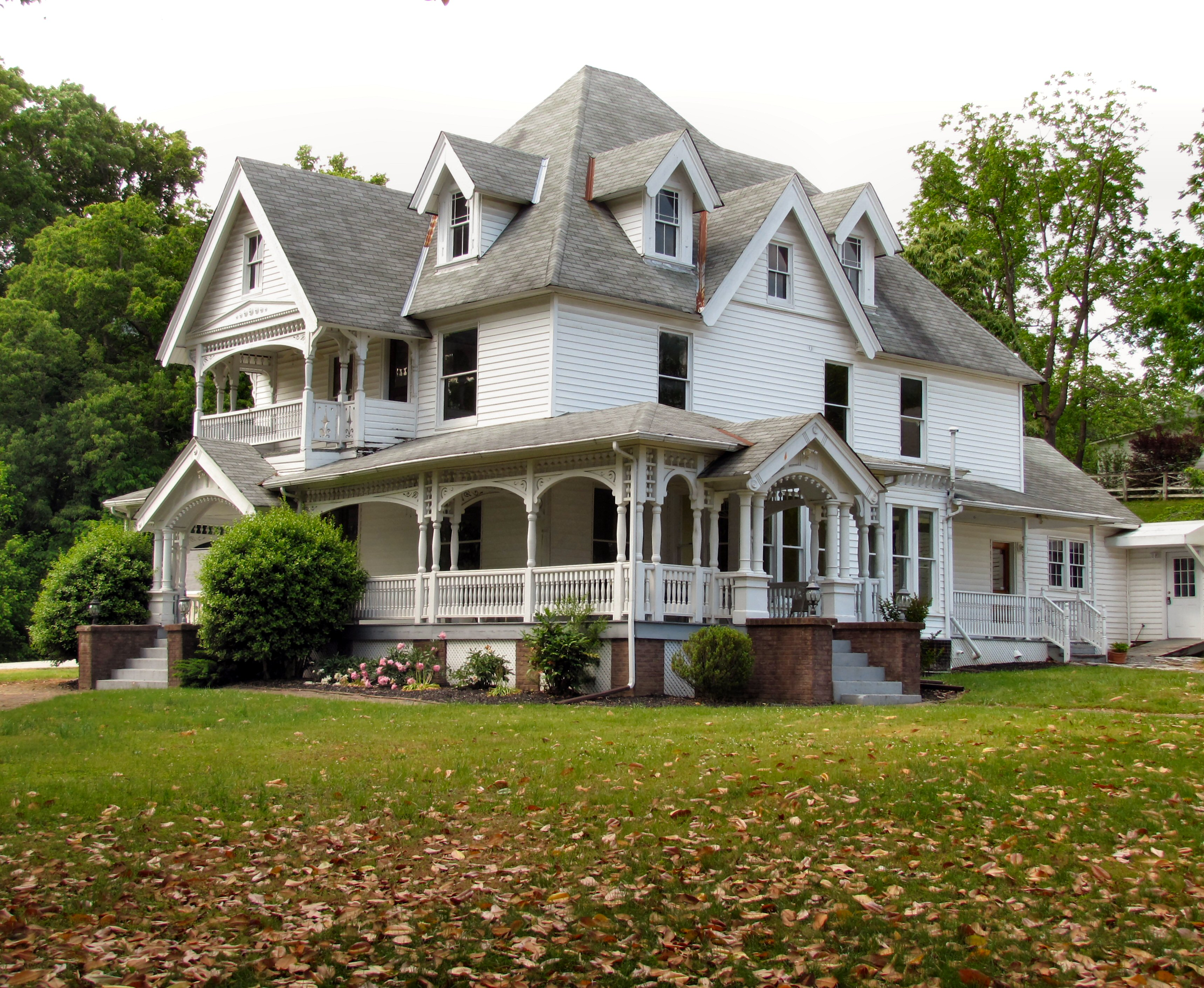
House in LaFollette, Tennessee

- Robert M. La Follette House: Robert M. La Follette Sr.'s home in Maple Bluff, Wisconsin.
- LaFollette House (LaFollette, Tennessee): home of Harvey Marion LaFollette

== See also ==
- List of United States political families
