= Elizabeth Thompson (painter) =

American painter (1954-2023)

Elizabeth Abrams Thompson (born 1954 in New York City, died 2023) was an American painter whose works have been described by writer and art historian Bonnie Clearwater as "a call to action for the reclamation of Paradise". She has painted the Florida Everglades as "de-peopled visions of a primordial Eden." Thompson lived in Florida and New York City.

== Early life and education ==
Thompson grew up in Englewood Cliffs, New Jersey, and graduated from Dwight Morrow High School in nearby Englewood. Thompson received a BA from Mount Holyoke College and graduated magna cum laude in 1975. Pratt Institute awarded her a BFA in 1977. She attended the Ecole des Beaux Arts in Paris from 1976 to 1977.

== Career ==
Thompson began her career by winning a competition to paint 135 oil storage tanks on the New Jersey side of the Hudson River. She then went to Paris and had her first exhibit on the Rue Seine in 1978. She has an extensive list of site specific murals that were commissioned by corporations and collectors. She also painted series that include subjects such as Paris monuments and sphinxes, swimming pools at night, African landscapes, the Everglades and impending environmental events. Bruce Helander, in the introduction to the book that accompanied her exhibition at the Coral Springs Museum of Art, says "Thompson's a visual storyteller whose canvases are filled with plot-twists." Thompson has had 17 solo exhibitions and has participated in 16 group exhibitions. She co-curated an exhibition "Pools" that toured gallery and museum venues worldwide, including at a Gallery in Moscow, Russia in 1989. This exhibition was the first independent show in a nongovernment gallery in Moscow since 1917. At an exhibition of her Africa paintings, some visitors commented that the landscapes reminded them of the Everglades. After floating through a tunnel of mangroves, she was hooked. Critic Jon Thomasson wrote of her palette, "you discover shades of green you didn't know existed".

== Style ==
Thompson used both the traditional method of oil and canvas, but beginning in 2017 began experimenting with acrylics on unprimed canvas. She painted on the floor and allowed the "accidents" created by pouring paint directly on the canvas to dictate the eventual subject and composition of the work.

== Personal life ==
Thompson married Richard Thompson in 1978 and was widowed in 2006. She lived with her partner, Guerrino De Luca, until her death in 2023. She has two daughters, Victoria Thompson and Antonia Thompson Weisman.

== Solo exhibitions ==
- 1974 Mount Holyoke College Museum, Massachusetts.
- 1977 Pratt Institute Gallery, New York.
- 1978 Galerie Les Arts Plastiques Modernes, Paris.
- 1979 Knokke-Le-Zoute, Belgium.
- 1983 Andrew Crispo Gallery, New York.
- 1989 Galeria Lavignes-Bastile, Paris / Albemarle Gallery, London.
- 1990 Barbara Gilman Gallery, Miami, Florida.
- 1993 John Harms Center, Englewood, New Jersey.
- 1996 Art Miami, Miami, Florida / Adamar Fine Arts, Miami, Florida / Caesarea Gallery, Boca Raton, Florida.
- 2001 Walter Wickiser Gallery, New York, New York / Somerhill Gallery, Durham, North Carolina.
- 2004 Walter Wickiser Gallery, New York, New York.
- 2006 Leila Taghinia-Milani Heller Gallery, New York.
- 2009 Leila Heller Gallery, New York.
- 2012 Leila Heller Gallery, New York.
- 2013 Pop Up Show Royal Poinciana Plaza, Florida.
- 2015 Capitol Exhibition Gallery, Florida Division of Cultural Affairs, Tallahassee, Florida.
- 2019 "40 Years of Painting", Coral Springs Museum of Art, Coral Springs, Florida.
- 2015 Capitol Exhibition, Tallahassee, Florida.

== Group exhibitions ==
- 1981 Six at Mount Holyoke College Museum, Massachusetts.
- 1982 "Selected 20th Century American Painting & Sculpture," / Andrew Crispo Gallery, New York / "Collectors Gallery 16," McKay Art Museum, San Antonio, Texas.
- 1983 "Selected 20th Century American Painting & Sculpture," / Andrew Crispo Gallery, New York.
- 1988 "New York — New Works," Helande Gallery, Palm Beach, Florida.
- 1990 "Pools", Modus Vivendi Gallery, Zurich, Switzerland / "Pools", Art Moderne Gallery, Moscow, Russia / "Pools", Norton Museum, West Palm Beach, Florida.
- 1991 "Nuptuals", Helander Gallery, New York / "Pools", Stuart Levy Gallery, New York / "Pools", Stuart Levy and Helander Galleries, New York City.
- 1992 Helander Gallery, Palm Beach, Florida / "Pools", Aspen Art Museum, Aspen, Colorado.
- 1996 Art Miami, Miami, Florida / Adamar Fine Arts, Miami, Florida / Caesarea Gallery, Boca Raton, Florida.
- 2005 Art Miami, Miami, Florida / Adamar Fine Arts, Miami, Florida.
- 2008 Scope Art Fair Miami, Leila Taghinia-Milani Heller Gallery, New York.
- 2010 Tripoli Gallery, South Hampton.
- 2010 Miami International Airport.
- 2012 Art Basel, (Art Miami) Leila Heller Gallery.

== Awards and honors ==
- 1974 Janet F. Brooks Memorial Prize in Painting.
- 1975 Phi Beta Kappa Award.
- 1976-77 Skinner Foundation Fellowship.
- 1977-78 Rotary Foundation Fellowship.
- 1979-81 Artist in Residence, Centre Georges Pompidou, Paris.
- 1984-86 Artist in Residence, PS 1, Queens, New York.
- 2006 Artist in Residence, Everglades National Park, Florida.
- 2009 National Organization of Women, NOW award for Women of Power and Substance.

== Commissions ==
- 1975 Mural Commission for Village in the Park, Chicago, Illinois / Hotel, Stamford, Connecticut.
- 1976 Conversion of 135 oil storage tanks into a work of art. 300,000 square feet on the bank of the Hudson River, Commissioned by Belfer Associates and Prudential Insurance Company.
- 1977 Mural Commission for the Rosalie Clinic, Aubervilliers.
- 1981 Mural Commission for the Earl of Suffolk and Berkshire Charlton Park, Malmesbury, England.
- 1983 Mural Commission for the Wilmington Trust Company, Wilmington, Delaware.
- 1984 Mural Commission for Southwestern Bell Telephone, Dallas, Texas.
- 1985 Triptych for Lincoln Properties, Dallas, Texas.
- 1986 Two murals commissioned for the Club Corporation of America, Dallas, Texas.
- 1989 Mural Commission for Robert Wood Johnson IV, Rockefeller Center, New York.
- 1990 Mural Commission for the Association to Benefit Children, New York / Mural Commission for Mr. and Mrs. Tom Wolfe, New York.
- 1991 Mural Commission for Mr. and Mrs. Robert Wood Johnson IV for "The Farm", Lammington, New Jersey.
- 1993 Mural Commission for El Grupo Financiero Asemex Banpais, Mexico City.
- 1994 Second Mural Commission for El Grupo Financiero Asemex Banpais, Mexico City.
- 1995 Mural Commission for the Delaware Water Authority, Delaware Memorial Bridge.
- 1996 Mural aboard Ferry Boat for the Delaware Water Authority Mural on façade of five-story building for the Association To Benefit Children.
- 1997 Mural Commission for Marriott Shanghai Tang Emporium, First National Bank of Florida.
- 1998 Mural Commission for New York University Hospital, New York.
- 2000 Mural Commission for the Board Room of Metropolitan Life Insurance Company, New York.
- 2003 Mural Commission for Mr. and Mrs. Glen Dubin, New York.

== Collections ==
- McKay Art Museum, San Antonio, Texas.
- Museum of Modern Art, Rio de Janeiro, Brazil.
- Coral Springs Museum of Art, Coral Springs, Florida.
- Mr. and Mrs. Peter Brown.
- Mr. Howard Gittis.
- Mr. Itchko Ezratti.
- Mrs. Francis Lloyd.
- Weil, Gotschal and Manges, New York City.
- Wells, Rich and Green, New York City.
- Ingram Yusek, New York City.
- Mr. and Mrs. Jonathan Hess.
- Mr. Harry Joe Brown.
- Dr. and Mrs. Patrick Stubgen.
- Mr. and Mrs. Tom Wolfe.
- Mr. and Mrs. William Rayner.

== Bibliography ==
- "Where the Wild Things Are"
- "Elizabeth Thompson's Enchanted Forest" Bonnie Clearwater for the catalog for "Elizabeth Thompson, 40 Years of Painting"
- "Ever-Present, Effervescent, EVERGLADES" Bruce Helander
- Linda Haase, "Life of painting leads local artist to depict the beauty of the Everglades", The Palm Beach Post, 2004
- John Thomason "Where the Wild Things Are:An Elizabeth Thompson retrospective", Boca Magazine
- "The Great Mall of China", The New York Times, November 20, 1997
- "The Taste of Tang", People Magazine, 1998
- "Ferry fare gets passengers a frigate trip, too" The Philadelphia Inquirer, 1996
- "Exhibition displays dream context" The Palm Beach Post, 1996
- Splash of Color, "Splash of Color" The Palm Beach Post, 1996
- "Elizabeth Thompson, Caesarea" Art News May 1996
- Gary Schwan, "Norton hopes pool art will make a splash" Palm Beach Post, 1990
- Skip Sheffield, "Artists make collective splash with pool settings" Palm Beach Post, 1990
- "Go for a Swim at the Aspen Art Museum" by John Fitzgerald, Aspen Daily News
- Evonne E. Coutros, "Image, duality and reflection", The Bergen Record, 1993
- "The Goliath Gambit" The Dallas Morning News 1999
