= Robert La Follette (disambiguation) =

Robert La Follette may refer to:

- Robert M. La Follette, Robert Marion "Fighting Bob" La Follette Sr. (1855–1925), an American politician
  - Robert M. La Follette House, Maple Bluff, Wisconsin, U.S.
  - Robert M. La Follette School of Public Affairs, University of Wisconsin–Madison, U.S.
  - Robert M. La Follette High School, Madison, Wisconsin, U.S.
  - Robert M. La Follette Sr. (Davidson), a statue
- Robert M. La Follette Jr., Robert Marion "Young Bob" La Follette Jr. (1895–1953), an American politician, son of Robert Sr.

== See also ==
- La Follette (disambiguation)
