= Somerhill =

Somerhill may refer to:

- Somerhill House, Tonbridge, United Kingdom
  - The Schools at Somerhill (located in Somerhill House)
- Somerhill Gallery, Durham, North Carolina, an art gallery

== See also ==
- Summerhill (disambiguation)
