= LaFollette House (LaFollette, Tennessee) =

Historic house in Tennessee, United States

- U.S. National Register of Historic Places
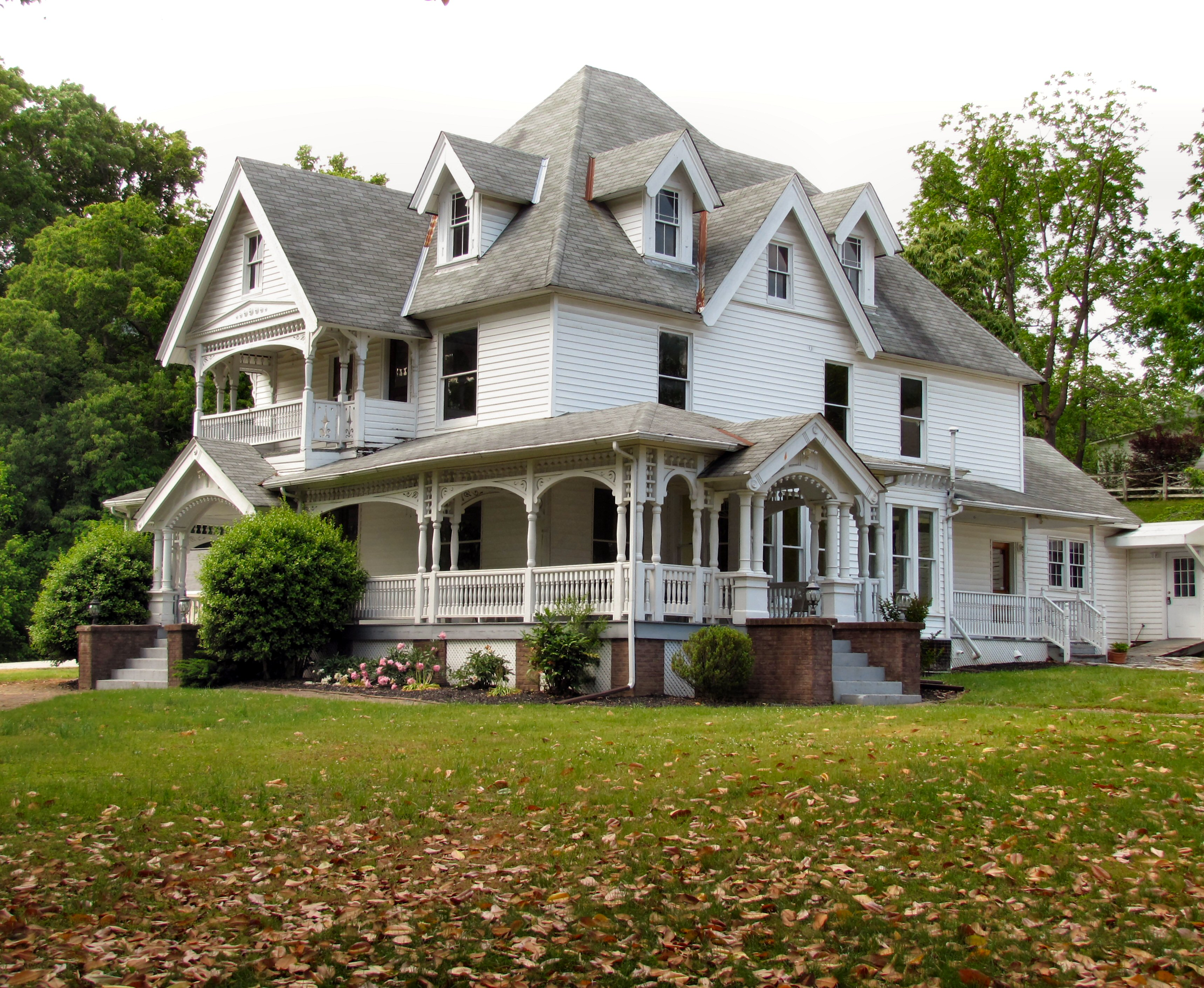
- LaFollette House in 2015

- Location within Tennessee
- Location: 203 S. Indiana Avenue, LaFollette, Tennessee
- Coordinates: 36°22′55.043″N 84°07′8.392″W
- Area: 2.5 acres (1.0 ha)
- Built: 1892
- Architectural style: Late Victorian
- NRHP reference No.: 75001736
- Added to NRHP: May 29, 1975

The LaFollette House (also known as Glen Oaks) is a historic house in LaFollette, Tennessee, U.S.A.. It was built in the 1890s for Grant LaFollette and Harvey Marion LaFollette, two brothers who owned the LaFollette Coal and Iron Company. The LaFollette brothers also built the North Tennessee Railroad. They sold the house to the Russell family in 1930. It was later sold to the Rogers family and still later to the Stone family. In September 2020 the home sold to the current residents.

The house was designed in the Victorian architectural style. It has been listed on the National Register of Historic Places since May 29, 1975.

== See also ==
- Robert M. La Follette House: La Follette family home in Maple Bluff, Wisconsin.
