= Carl Stiner =

United States Army general (1936–2022)

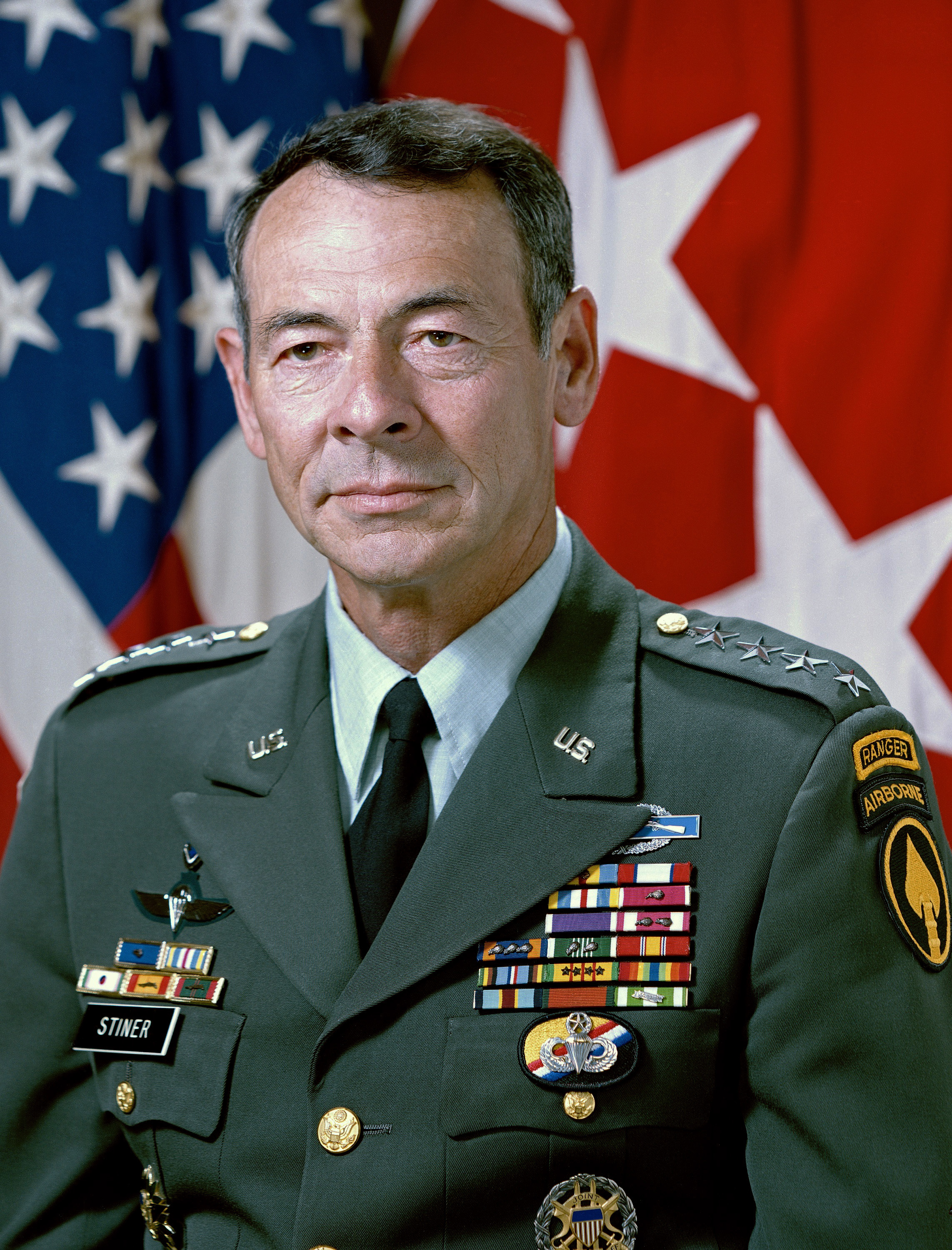
- Born: Carl Wade Stiner; 7 September 1936; LaFollette, Tennessee, U.S.
- Died: 2 June 2022 (aged 85); Knoxville, Tennessee, U.S.
- Spouse: Sue Stiner
- Military career
- Allegiance: United States of America
- Branch: United States Army
- Service years: 1958–1993
- Rank: General
- Commands: U.S. Special Operations Command; XVIII Airborne Corps; Joint Special Operations Command; 82nd Airborne Division
- Conflicts: Vietnam War; Operation Just Cause; Operation Desert Storm
- Awards: Defense Distinguished Service Medal (2); Army Distinguished Service Medal; Defense Superior Service Medal; Legion of Merit (2); Purple Heart; Meritorious Service Medal (3); Air Medal (4); Army Commendation Medal (3)
- Other work: Farmer

Carl Wade Stiner (7 September 1936 – 2 June 2022) was a United States Army four-star general who served as Commander in Chief, United States Special Operations Command (USCINCSOC) from 1990 to 1993.

== Military career ==
Stiner was born in LaFollette, Tennessee, on 7 September 1936. He graduated from Tennessee Polytechnic Institute in 1958 with a Bachelor of Science degree and was commissioned in the Infantry. He served initially with the 9th Infantry Regiment at Fort Benning, Georgia and commanded a basic training company at Fort Jackson.

His first special operations tour of duty was from 1964 to 1966 with the 3rd Special Forces Group at Fort Bragg, North Carolina. Following graduation from the Army Command and General Staff College in 1967, he served in the Vietnam War as both an infantry battalion and brigade operations officer (S-3) with the 4th Infantry Division.

In 1970, after a tour with Headquarters, Department of the Army in Washington, D.C., he joined the 82nd Airborne Division where he commanded the 2nd Battalion, 325th Airborne Infantry Regiment, and served as the Division operations officer (G3). Following graduation from the Army War College and Shippensburg State College in 1975, and a tour in Saudi Arabia, he commanded the 1st Infantry Training Brigade at Fort Benning.

Promoted to brigadier general in 1980, he served first as the chief of staff, Rapid Deployment Joint Task Force (RDJTF), then headquartered at MacDill Air Force Base, and later as the assistant division commander of the 82nd Airborne Division. After serving on the Joint Staff in Washington, D.C., as assistant deputy director for politico-military affairs, in 1984 he was promoted to major general and appointed commanding general of the Joint Special Operations Command at Fort Bragg.

He held this post until assigned as commanding general, 82nd Airborne Division, in January 1987. In October 1988 he was named commanding general, XVIII Airborne Corps and Fort Bragg. As commanding general, XVIII Airborne Corps, he was designated commander, Joint Task Force South, and served as the operational commander of all forces employed on Operation Just Cause in Panama in December 1989.

In May 1990 he was promoted to the rank of general and became the second commander in chief of the United States Special Operations Command, headquartered at MacDill Air Force Base, Florida. As commander in chief, he was responsible for the readiness of all special operations forces of the Army, Navy, and Air Force, both active duty and reserve, retiring in May 1993.

During his 35-year career, Stiner commanded the Army's preeminent contingency strike forces; including the Joint Special Operations Command, the 82nd Airborne Division and the XVIII Airborne Corps. Stiner has an extensive background in special operations. Among the many missions in which he was involved was the capture of the terrorists in the Achille Lauro hijacking, the Panama invasion and the capture of Panamanian dictator Manuel Noriega, and all special operations activities during Operation Desert Storm.

Stiner was inducted into the Ranger Hall of Fame in 2004.

== Awards and decorations ==

Badge	Combat Infantryman Badge		
1st row	Defense Distinguished Service Medal with 1 Oak leaf cluster		Army Distinguished Service Medal
2nd row	Defense Superior Service Medal	Legion of Merit with 1 Oak leaf cluster	Purple Heart
3rd row	Meritorious Service Medal with 2 Oak leaf clusters	Air Medal with 3 Oak leaf clusters	Army Commendation Medal with 3 Oak leaf clusters
4th row	Army Good Conduct Medal	American Defense Service Medal	American Campaign Medal
5th row	National Defense Service Medal with 1 Service star	Armed Forces Expeditionary Medal with 1 Service star	Vietnam Service Medal with 4 Campaign stars
6th row	National Defense Service Medal with 1 Oak leaf cluster	Korean Service Medal with 5 Campaign stars	Armed Forces Expeditionary Medal
7th row	Army Service Ribbon	Army Overseas Service Ribbon	Vietnam Campaign Medal
Badge	Master Parachutist Badge		
Tab	Ranger Tab		
Badge	Army Staff Identification Badge		Joint Chiefs of Staff Identification Badge
Unit Awards	Presidential Unit Citation with 1 Oak leaf cluster		Joint Meritorious Unit Award
Unit Awards	Korean Presidential Unit Citation	RVN Gallantry Cross Unit Citation with Palm	RVN Civil Actions Unit Citation with Palm

== Post-military career ==
Stiner co-authored the 2002 book Shadow Warriors: Inside the Special Forces with Tom Clancy. He was also a recipient of the Freedom Foundation Award and the Distinguished Alumnus award from Tennessee Technological University and served as chairman of the Special Operations Warrior Foundation. Stiner was also active teaching the joint warfare fighting course at the Joint Forces Staff College in Norfolk, Virginia, and worked as a senior advisor for new joint war fighting experiments.

Stiner died at a medical facility in Knoxville, Tennessee, on 2 June 2022, at the age of 85.

== Additional recognition ==
An approximately 10-mile (16 km) stretch of State Highway 63 between LaFollette and Speedwell, Tennessee, is named in honor of General Stiner. The Army ROTC offices at Stiner's alma mater, Tennessee Tech, have been renamed the Carl W. Stiner Leadership Center in his honor.

On 7 September 2002, an oil portrait in the likeness of General Carl Wade Stiner, by California Artist Sylvia Rogers-Barnes, was unveiled to a company of interested citizens, friends and relatives of General Stiner, at the proposed location of a new Veterans' Memorial Museum in Jacksboro, Tennessee. Since that time, the portrait is being housed at the Campbell County Historical Society located at 235 E. Central Ave. in LaFollette, Tennessee, and curated by Jerry Sharp at that location.

The biographical material and photo of the portrait of General Stiner has been entered into the Catalog of American Portraits, Center for Electronic Research and Outreach Services, National Portrait Gallery Smithsonian Institution, Washington, D.C.

In February 2015, the radio program This American Life featured General Stiner prominently for his role in creating The Soldier Safety Show at Fort Bragg, a mixture of serious videos and upbeat show-tunes that helped reduce the number of soldiers' deaths from dangerous behaviors off-duty.

== Published works ==
- Clancy, Tom; Stiner, Carl (2002). Shadow Warriors: Inside the Special Forces. New York: G.P. Putnam's Sons. ISBN 0399147837.
