= Harvey Marion LaFollette =

American teacher & educator (1858–1929)

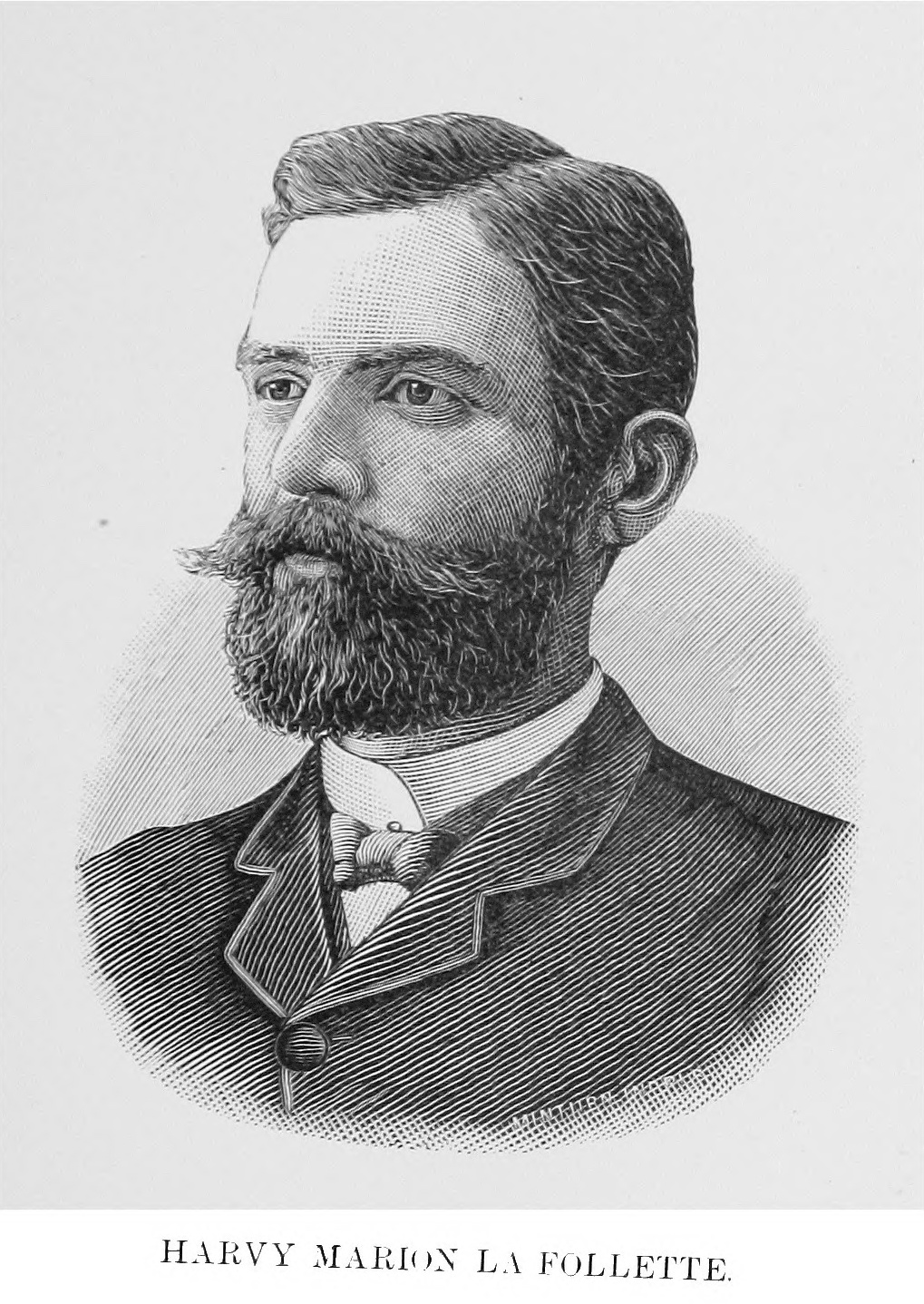
- Portrait, c. 1887
- Born: September 8, 1858; Primrose, Wisconsin
- Died: September 20, 1929 (aged 71); Colfax, Washington

Harvey Marion LaFollette (September 8, 1858 – September 20, 1929) was an American teacher and educator, who as a young man, served two terms as Indiana Superintendent of Public Instruction. He then moved to Tennessee, where he established the town of LaFollette with his brother Grant LaFollette. Their company, LaFollette Coal, Iron, and Railway Company, eventually employed more than 1500 people and was the largest blast furnace in the Southern United States.

== Early life and education ==
Harvey M. LaFollette was born in Primrose, Wisconsin. His first cousin, Robert Marion La Follette Sr., was three years old at the time and living on the adjoining farm. Harvey's father (also named Harvey M. LaFollette) was a farmer and served in local government both as sheriff and commissioner. When Harvey was two years old, his family relocated to join relatives in Thorntown, Indiana. Harvey's brother, William La Follette, was born shortly after they arrived in Indiana. When he was seven years old, his father was killed in an industrial accident while working on a piece of machinery in the flour mill he owned.

Young Harvey was always an avid reader, and after studying at the nearby Friends School and a short stint at Wabash College, he left for France, the land of his Huguenot ancestors, to continue his education. He studied in Paris at several institutions focusing on languages and civil engineering. He left Paris, travelling on foot and staying with peasant families to better understand the local dialects. He took additional courses in Germany and in Italy. He returned to Indiana in 1880 as a well-educated and travelled young man. He spoke five languages fluently.

== Indiana educator ==
He began teaching in the public schools as soon as he returned from abroad and became a school principal and a county superintendent before running for statewide office at the age of 28. He was elected to two terms as Indiana Superintendent of Public Instruction. In this job, he established a number of reforms as he standardized the textbooks and regularized the financial systems.

== LaFollette, Tennessee ==
Along with his youngest brother, Grant LaFollette, Harvey then moved 400 miles (640 km) to the south and purchased more than 37,000 acres (150 km^{2}) of land in the Tennessee mountains. He co-founded the LaFollette Coal, Iron, and Railway Company with his brother, and served as president and general manager. The company eventually employed 1,500 people and became the largest blast furnace in the Southern United States. The brothers launched a railroad company to support their production. They also founded the town of LaFollette TN, which became the county seat of Campbell County.

== Personal life ==
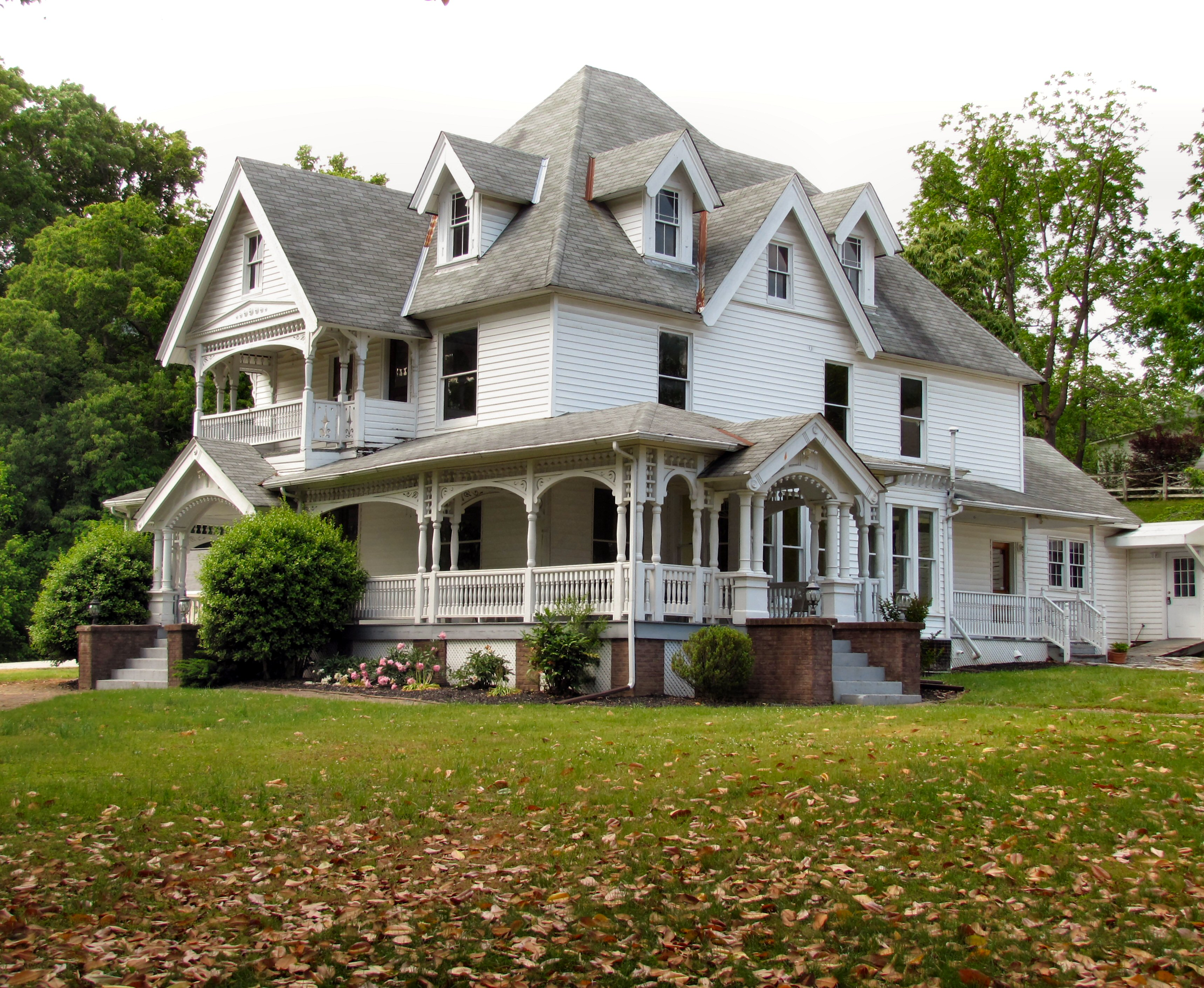
Glen Oaks

Harvey and Grant built and lived in Glen Oaks, a 27–room mansion in the center of LaFollette designed by Knoxville architect George Franklin Barber. The home on Indiana Avenue is listed in the National Register of Historic Places. As his company grew, he traveled extensively and remained close to his extended family. During the glare of the Wisconsin governor's race of 1900, his mother and older brother and sister returned to Primrose with cousin Robert and other family members to visit the old log cabin where Harvey was born and to relive memories of the pioneering days of a half century earlier. During the next decade, Harvey and his wife, Katherine Warner (LaFollette) Cooper were often in Washington, DC, visiting family members and meeting political allies. Vice President Charles W. Fairbanks was a friend from his younger days in Indiana. His brother and cousin both moved to the nation's capitol as members of Congress, and he visited them often. Later in his life, when the mines no longer produced and his business failed, he returned to his academic roots, corresponding with Abraham Lincoln scholar Louis A. Warren, who wrote The Lincoln and LaFollette Families in Pioneer Drama, a history of the Lincoln and LaFollette families on the Kentucky frontier in the years before Jesse LaFollette and Thomas Lincoln took their families across the Ohio River to settle in Indiana Territory.

== Family ==
He was a member of the La Follette family. William La Follette was a younger brother. Robert M. La Follette Sr. was his first cousin. William Leroy LaFollette Jr. and Chester La Follette were nephews. Suzanne La Follette was a niece. Mimi LaFollette Summerskill was a grand niece. Her son was political leader Richard L. Wright. His only child, born May 19, 1899 - Marion Warner LaFollette. Later changed his last name from LaFollette to Cooper (step-father's last name), in Jackson County, MO Circuit Court on Sep 23,1918. He died Feb 21, 1934 (aged 34) Harvey was visiting his brother, William, in Colfax, Washington when he died in 1929. Both he and William and other LaFollette family members are interred in the Colfax Cemetery in Whitman County, Washington.
