= Charles S. Eastman =

American politician

Charles Eastman

Member of the South Dakota House of Representatives for Fall River County
- In office 1907–1908

Personal details
- Born: January 23, 1864 Primrose, Wisconsin, U.S.
- Died: August 26, 1939 (aged 75) Hot Springs, South Dakota, U.S.
- Party: Democratic
- Relations: Robert M. La Follette (uncle); Philip La Follette (cousin); Robert La Follette Jr. (cousin); Fola La Follette (cousin)
- Education: Northwestern Business College

Charles Sumner Eastman (January 23, 1864 – August 26, 1939) was an American politician and lawyer who served as a member of the South Dakota House of Representatives. Eastman was a member of the La Follette family, a prominent political family in Wisconsin.

== Early life and education ==
Born in Primrose, Wisconsin, Eastman was educated in the Dane County public schools and at the Northwestern Business College.

== Career ==
In 1882, he moved to Dakota Territory and settled in Plankinton, Dakota Territory. In 1888, he was admitted to the Dakota Territory bar and practiced law in what is now Hot Springs, South Dakota and was senior member of Eastman & Dudley Law Firm. He served as county judge of Fall River County, South Dakota from 1887 to 1889 and then was deputy sheriff and sheriff of Fall River County from 1892 to 1897. He served as a Democrat in the South Dakota House of Representatives from 1907 to 1908.

== Personal life ==
His uncle was Robert M. La Follette, who served as a member of the United States Senate. Philip La Follette, Robert M. La Follette Jr., and Fola La Follette were Eastman's first cousins. Eastman died in Hot Springs, South Dakota.
