= Eli Pederson =

American politician

Eli Pederson (July 26, 1837 – August 17, 1909) was an American farmer and politician.

Born in Voss, Norway, Pederson emigrated with his parents to the United States in 1852 and settled in Racine County, Wisconsin. In 1854, Pederson and his parents settled in the town of Primrose, Dane County, Wisconsin. Pederson was a farmer and livestock dealer. He served on the Primrose Town Board and was also the town chairman. Pederson also served on the school board. In 1883, Pederson served in the Wisconsin State Assembly and was a Republican. During the administration of Wisconsin Governor Robert La Follette, Sr., Pederson served as a Wisconsin state treasury agent. Pederson died at his home in the town of Primrose, Wisconsin.
