= William La Follette =

American politician

William Leroy La Follette
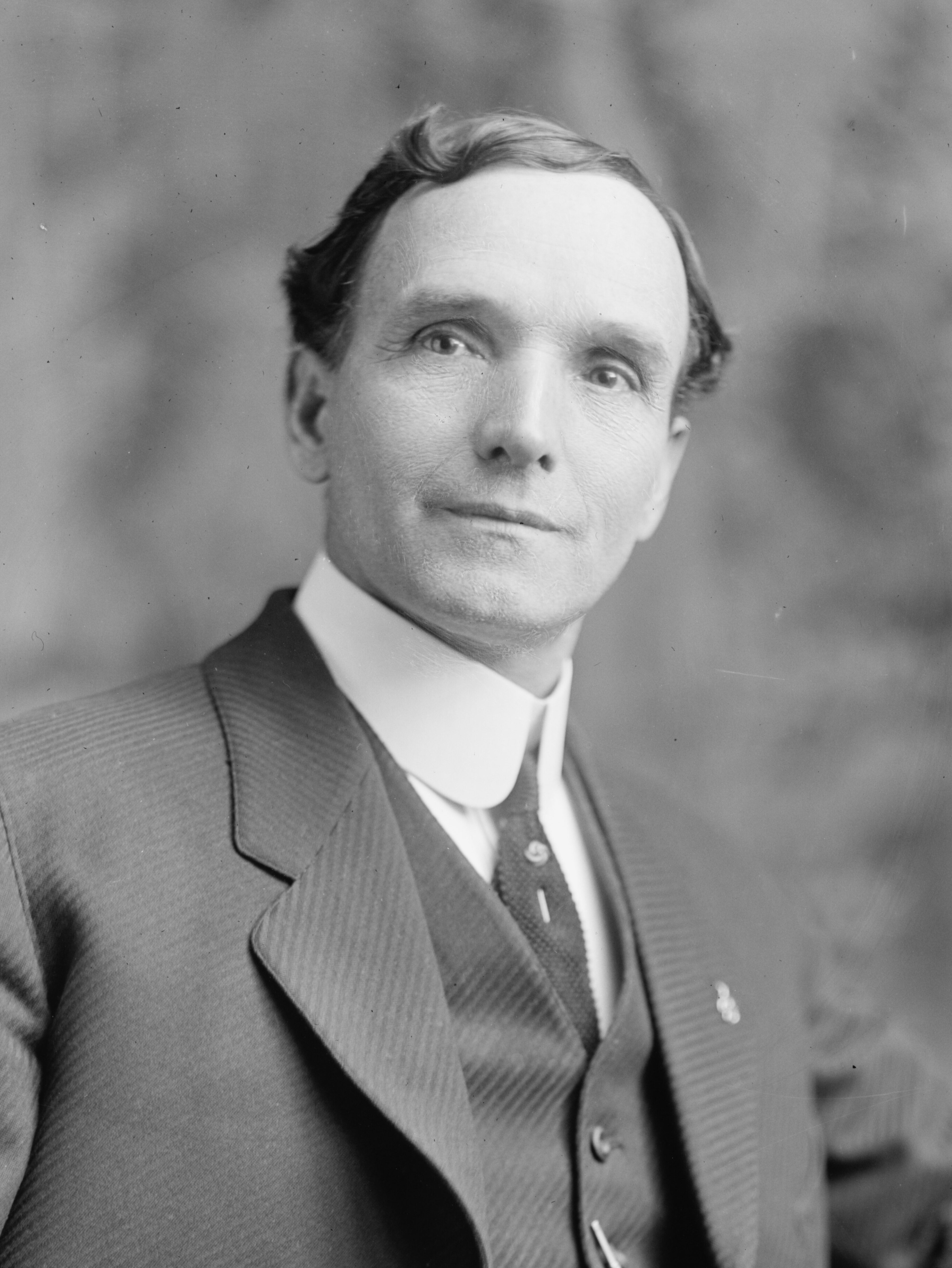

Member of the U.S. House of Representatives from Washington
- In office March 4, 1911 – March 3, 1919
- Preceded by: Miles Poindexter
- Succeeded by: John W. Summers
- Constituency: 3rd district (1911–1915); 4th district (1915–1919)

Member of the Washington House of Representatives from the 7th district
- In office 1899–1901

Personal details
- Born: William Leroy La Follette; November 30, 1860 Thorntown, Indiana, U.S.
- Died: December 20, 1934 (aged 74) Colfax, Washington, U.S.
- Party: Republican
- Occupation: American politician

William Leroy La Follette (November 30, 1860 – December 20, 1934) was a four-term member of the United States House of Representatives representing Washington. He represented the 3rd District from 1911 to 1915, and the 4th District from 1915 to 1919. La Follette was a member of the prominent La Follette family.

== Early life and education ==
William Leroy La Follette was born in Thorntown, Indiana, on November 30, 1860. In 1854 William's father, Harvey LaFollette, was just 22 years old and newly married. He moved from Indiana to Primrose, Wisconsin to join his older brother Josiah (15 years his senior) in a farming venture. The LaFollettes had lived in the Knob Creek area of Kentucky for a generation before William's grandfather, Jesse LaFollette relocated his entire family to Putnam County, Indiana in order to leave land title and slavery issues behind him.

William's brother, Harvey Marion LaFollette, and his cousin, Robert M. La Follette, Sr., were both born in Primrose in log cabins built by the two LaFollette brothers. After Josiah's premature death from diabetes, William's father returned to Indiana, settling near other LaFollette relatives where he continued farming and built a flour mill. William's birth took place shortly after his family's arrived in Thorntown, Indiana late in 1860. For five years additional siblings arrived and his family grew and prospered. Tragedy struck in 1865 when his father was killed in an industrial accident at the mill. William worked on the farm, clerked in a store, learned the jewelry business, and attended the local normal (public) schools.

William and his older brother, Harvey, both left their Indiana home in 1876. Harvey travelled to Europe to continue his studies in Paris. The sixteen-year-old William headed west to the Washington Territory and took up farming in Whitman County, an area in the Palouse that had been off limits to settlers since the Indian Wars of the 1850s. Too young to qualify for land under the Homestead Act, he returned to Indiana where he took some business courses at Central Indiana Normal College (later Canterbury College (Indiana).

== Business career ==
He returned to the Palouse after these studies, staked his claim and began farming. He engaged in agricultural pursuits (mainly wheat), stock raising, and fruit growing. Later, he was extensively engaged as an orchardist at Wawawai on the Snake River, having purchased some 375 ac from his father-in-law, John Tabor (one of the founders of Whitman County) who had been among the first settlers to bring apples to the region.

He added to these fruit holdings, expanded his crops, built an aerial tramway to transfer the fruit across river to access the new railroad, created a sawmill to make the wooden boxes for shipping, and was responsible for making Wawawai the largest shipping point for fruit along the Snake River.

He shipped many vegetables and hogs as well as fruit and, by the early 1900s, his land holdings along the river exceeded 1000 ac. In order to educate his family, La Follette built a large home in Pullman to be near Washington State College. He sold a large portion of his fruit holdings and entered the world of national politics.

== Public service and politics ==
La Follette was a member of the World's Fair Commission and had charge of the Washington State building at the Chicago Exposition in 1893. He served as a member of the State House of Representatives from 1899 to 1901. He also served on the School Board and was an active member of the Grange. He was elected as a Republican to the Sixty-second and to the three succeeding Congresses (March 4, 1911 to March 3, 1919). He was active on the House Committee on Public Lands and engaged deeply in land use and water issues. His policy interests reached far beyond the region he represented in the Pacific Northwest. He fought for the passage of bills that brought water to San Francisco and the creation of the National Park Service. He joined with his cousin, Robert M. La Follette in opposing President Woodrow Wilson's foreign policy decisions, and like his cousin voted against declaring war on Germany. For much of the time he was in Congress, the two LaFollette families shared a large house that he had purchased in Mount Pleasant, Washington D.C. The house became a center for debate and discussions of the great issues of the day as a steady stream of politicians, policy makers, academics, artists and labor and business leaders debated late into the night. In 1918 he ran unsuccessfully for renomination in the Republican primary.

== Later years ==
After leaving elected office La Follette resided in Spokane, Washington from 1920 to 1923 and in Princess Anne, Maryland from 1924 to 1925. After the failed presidential bid and death of his cousin Robert, William La Follette returned permanently to the Palouse.

He moved to Colfax, Washington in 1927 and resumed his former business activities.

== Death ==
Both he and his wife, Mary Tabor, died in 1934.

== Family ==
He was a member of the politically prominent La Follette family. His son, William Leroy "Roy" LaFollette Jr., served for many years as Prosecuting Attorney for Whitman County (1922–1930, and again during World War II). He successfully ran for his father's old seat in the Washington House of Representatives in 1939, but was defeated in 1942 in a bid for Congress. One of his daughters, Suzanne La Follette, became a noted libertarian journalist. She helped to found The Freeman and National Review magazines. Another son, Chester La Follette, was a painter whose portrait of his father's first cousin, U.S. Senator Robert M. La Follette of Wisconsin, hangs in the United States Capitol.

William La Follette Sr.'s brother, Harvey Marion LaFollette, served as Indiana Superintendent of Public Instruction before moving to Tennessee, where he founded the city of LaFollette, Tennessee.

U.S. House of Representatives
Preceded by Miles Poindexter	Member of the U.S. House of Representatives from Washington's 3rd congressional district 1911–1915	Succeeded by Albert Johnson
Preceded by District created	Member of the U.S. House of Representatives from Washington's 4th congressional district 1915–1919	Succeeded by John W. Summers
