= William Leroy LaFollette Jr. =

American politician (1890–1950)

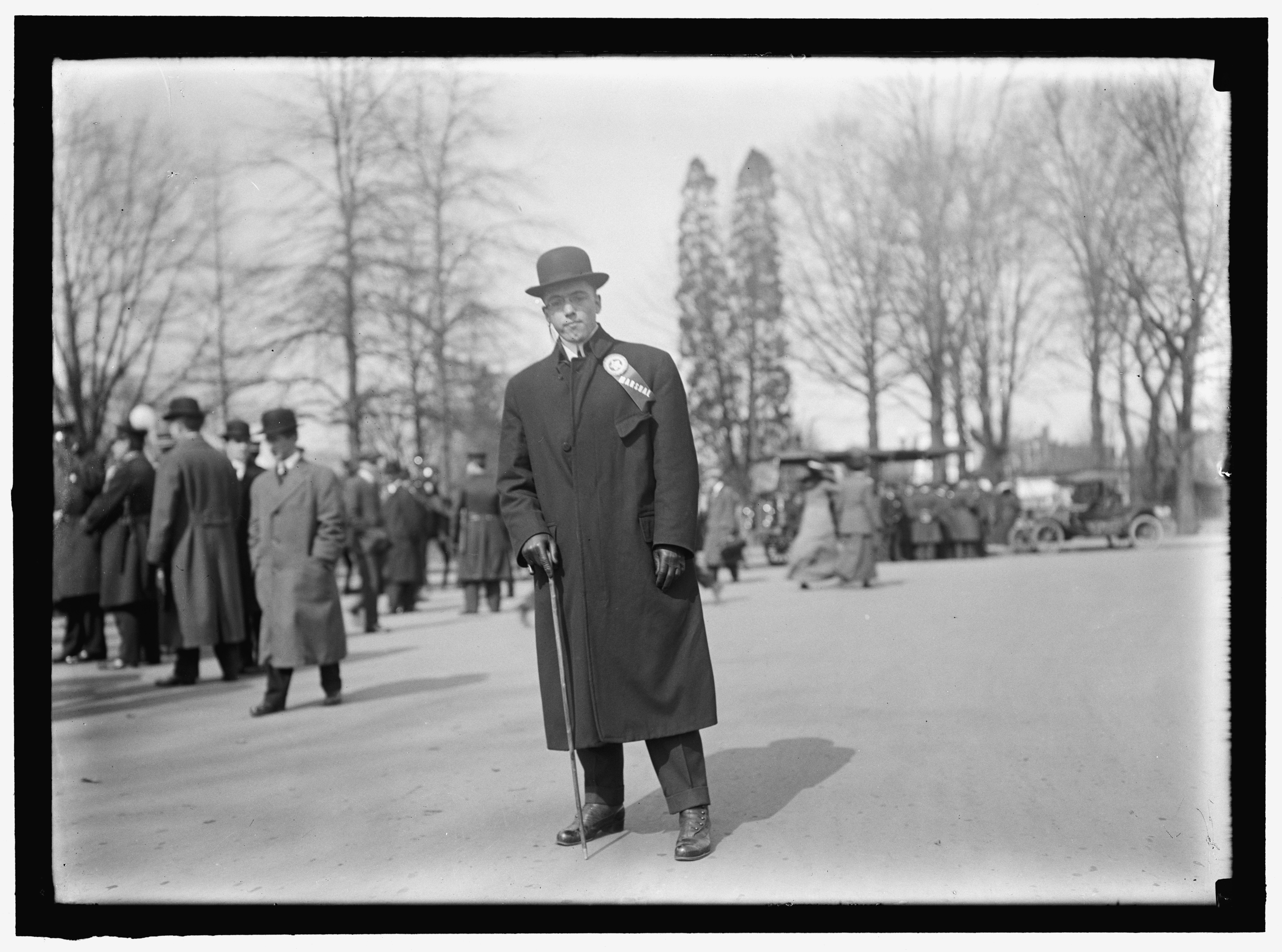
- William Leroy LaFollette Jr. in 1912.

Member of the Washington House of Representatives from the 9th district
- In office 1939–1941

Personal details
- Born: 1890
- Died: 1950 (aged 59–60)
- Party: Republican

William LeRoy "Roy" LaFollette Jr. (1890–1950) was an American political figure and lawyer. He served in the Washington House of Representatives in the State Legislature. He was elected Prosecuting Attorney of Whitman County several times. He was appointed by President Franklin Roosevelt to the Washington State Public Works Commission.

== Early life and education ==
Roy was raised in Whitman County on his family wheat ranches and fruit orchards. He graduated from Washington State University where he was a member of the ROTC and George Washington University Law School in Washington D.C.

== Political career ==
While still a law student, he ran his father, William La Follette's, Congressional office in the nation's capital. The Congressman shared his Mount Pleasant, Washington, D.C. house with his cousin, Robert M. La Follette and his family. At the age of 26, Roy returned to Washington State to run for Prosecuting Attorney in Whitman County. He served for many years as Prosecuting Attorney. He was elected to the Washington State Legislature. He was appointed to the Washington State Public Works Commission during the administration of Franklin Roosevelt. He lost bids for Lt. Governor and US Congress. He was a popular and well known campaigner who played his violin and sang songs on the stump. He was often accompanied by his wife, Helen, on the piano and his daughters: Mimi and Mary Lee, who performed Scottish dances as he played and sang.

== Personal life ==
He was a practicing attorney for many years in Colfax. He was president of the Whitman County Bar Association. He served on a number of local boards. He was a member of the La Follette family His father was Congressman William La Follette, first cousin of United States Senator Robert La Follette Sr. His uncle was Harvey Marion LaFollette. Suzanne La Follette was a younger sister. Chester La Follette was a younger brother. His older brother, Tabor LaFollette, compiled: The History of Colfax. He was the father of educator and author, Mimi LaFollette Summerskill.
