= Summerhill =

Summerhill or Summer Hill may refer to the following places:

== Australia ==
- Summer Hill, New South Wales, a suburb of Sydney with the largest population among localities of this name
- Summerhill, Tasmania, a suburb of Launceston
- Summerhill (Mount Duneed), a prefabricated iron cottage in Victoria

== Canada ==
- Summerhill, Toronto, Ontario, a neighbourhood
  - Summerhill (TTC), a subway station
  - Summerhill-North Toronto CPR Station, a 1916 former Canadian Pacific Railway station in Toronto

== India ==
- Summer Hill, Shimla, Himachal Pradesh

== Ireland ==
- Summerhill, Dublin, an area in the north inner city, Dublin
- Summerhill, County Meath, a village
  - Summerhill House, 100-roomed mansion of the Langford Rowley family
  - Summerhill GFC, a GAA club
- Summerhill College, a voluntary secondary school in Sligo

== United Kingdom ==
England

- Summerhill, an alternative name for Somerhill House, Kent
- Summerhill School, a school founded by Alexander Sutherland Neill, now located in Leiston, England

- Summerhill (book), Neill's book about the school, published for American audiences

- Summerhill School, a school located in Kingswinford, West Midlands, England

Northern Ireland

- Summerhill, County Fermanagh; see List of townlands of County Fermanagh

Scotland

- Summerhill, Aberdeen, Scotland, a suburb
- Summerhill, Dumfries, Scotland, a suburb
- Summerhill, an area of Drumchapel Glasgow, Scotland

Wales

- Summerhill, Pembrokeshire, a village
- Summerhill, Wrexham, Wales, a village
- Summerhill, Swansea, a small housing district

== United States ==
- Summerhill (Atlanta), Georgia, a neighborhood
- Summer Hill (Davidsonville, Maryland), a historic home
- Summer Hill, Illinois
- Summer Hill (Maynard, Massachusetts), hill, park, and highest point in Maynard, Massachusetts
- Summerhill, New York, a town in Cayuga County
- Summerhill, Pennsylvania, a borough in Cambria County
- Summer Hill (Pittsburgh), a neighborhood
- Summerhill Township, Cambria County, Pennsylvania, largest population among localities in the United States of this name
- Summerhill Township, Crawford County, Pennsylvania, a township in Crawford County

== Other meanings ==
- Summerhill (band), a Scottish jangle pop band
- Summerhill (TV series), CBBC drama about the Summerhill School
- Bill Summerhill (1915–1978), Canadian ice hockey forward

== See also ==
- Somerhill (disambiguation)
