= John Summerskill =

Canadian-American educator and vintner

John Henry Summerskill (March 26, 1925 – June 14, 1990) was a Canadian educator who served as the seventh president of San Francisco State University in the 1960s. Prior to this he was vice president for student affairs at Cornell University. In the 1970s he was named president of Athens College in Greece. He later moved to New Jersey, where he established a vineyard and became president of the New Jersey Wine Growers Association.

== Education ==
He was born and raised in Canada, where he attended public schools before graduating from McGill University in Montreal excelling in football as well as academics. He received his PhD in clinical psychology from the University of Pennsylvania.

== Academic career ==
Joining the faculty of Cornell in the 1950s, he remained in Ithaca as a member of the faculty and administrator for fifteen years at which time he was named president of San Francisco State. His tenure in San Francisco was marked by student protests and clashes with Governor Ronald Reagan. After two years of turmoil he abruptly departed for Ethiopia. He worked in Addis Ababa at Haile Sellassie University (now Addis Ababa University) on a grant from the Ford Foundation. Later he became president of Athens College in Greece.

== Vintner ==
In the 1980s Dr. Summerskill retired from academic life and moved to Belle Mead, New Jersey, where he established a vineyard with his wife, Mimi LaFollette Summerskill. They sold their wine under the name LaFollette and he was chosen president of the New Jersey Wine Growers Association. Their vineyard became the gathering place for policy and political discussions. The 1989 harvest and the people who helped pick the grapes was featured in an article in the Wine Spectator.

== Writer ==
He was a prolific writer, and his articles on a number of different subjects appeared in numerous publications. In the book, President Seven, he detailed his experiences at San Francisco State.
