= Suzanne La Follette =

American journalist (1893–1983)

Suzanne Clara La Follette (June 24, 1893 – April 23, 1983) was an American journalist and author who advocated libertarian feminism in the first half of the 20th century. As an editor she helped found several magazines. She was an early and ardent feminist and a vocal anticommunist.

== Family ==
She was born in Washington state into the politically prominent La Follette family. Her father was U.S. Congressman William La Follette; her brothers were politician William Leroy LaFollette Jr. and Chester La Follette, a painter. Author Mimi LaFollette Summerskill was her niece. While living in Washington, D.C., with her family, Suzanne worked in her father's Capitol Hill office as well as that of his cousin Senator Robert M. La Follette. As a young woman still in college, she observed many of the great political and intellectual debates of the time at the home shared by the two LaFollette families.

== Work ==
Her full-length book, Concerning Women, published in 1926, broke ground in the 1920s, but went out of print for a second time after a 1972 reprint in the Arno Press American Women series. In 1973, an excerpt entitled "Beware the State" was included in "The Feminist Papers," an anthology edited by Alice Rossi. A short biography of La Follette, based on interviews with her grandniece Maryly Rosner, her brother Chester La Follette, and her colleagues John Chamberlain, Priscilla Buckley (sister to conservative editor William F. Buckley Jr.) and Helen Tremaine, can be found in the article "Suzanne La Follette: The Freewomen" by Sharon Presley.

La Follette was active in the League of Equal Opportunity, a feminist organization that, unlike the larger National Woman's Party, opposed not just sex-based minimum wage legislation, but all such legislation. She explained her opposition to such laws in Concerning Women. Her economic views, like those of her mentor Albert Jay Nock, were libertarian but influenced by Henry George.

She had been interested in Russia since the revolution of 1917 and had been in contact with many exiles, including former president Alexander Kerensky. In the 1930s, La Follette served on the Committee for the Defense of Leon Trotsky, also known as the "Dewey Commission" as secretary to its chairman, philosopher John Dewey. La Follette wrote the summary of the committee's findings after holding an investigative meeting in Mexico where Trotsky was in exile (and later murdered by an agent of Joseph Stalin). Many of the committee's members, like La Follette, Carlo Tresca and Dewey, were not Trotskyists, but consisted of anti-Stalinist socialists, progressives and liberals.

She worked on the journal The Freeman both as a contributor and as assistant to the editor, Albert Jay Nock, and she later founded a revival of the magazine, called The New Freeman, in 1932. (It lasted only 15 months.) In the early 1950s, she served as a managing editor of yet another revival of Nock's journal, the libertarian periodical The Freeman, with John Chamberlain and Henry Hazlitt serving as executive editors. In that role, she came into periodic conflict with Hazlitt due to her "sometimes strident way of expressing herself" on behalf of Senator Joseph McCarthy. It is this magazine which is widely considered to be an important forerunner to the conservative National Review, founded by William F. Buckley Jr., another journal for which she was also an early contributor and managing editor.

But La Follette was not a traditional conservative. In the 1950s, there was no outlet for libertarian thought, so she joined forces with conservatives, who at that time were closer to libertarians than liberal Democrats were. In the interview conducted by Presley in 1980, her colleague John Chamberlain stated that she was a libertarian, not a conservative. Her feminist views in fact often clashed with the conservative point of view. Based on an interview with Buckley, as reported in the "Freewoman" profile, Presley states, for example, that "in 1964, when the New York Conservative Party, of which she was a co-founder, came out in favor of anti-abortion laws, she demanded that her name be dropped from the Party's letterhead—and it was."

== Early years and education ==
La Follette was born on a ranch in eastern Washington state, the fourth of seven children of a pioneer family that owned large wheat and fruit farms in the rolling hills of the Palouse and along the Snake River. She grew up in the wide open spaces of the American West. Her grandfather, John Tabor, was a 49er, having crossed the plains to California after service in the Mexican–American War.

Her father, William La Follette, had first come to the Washington Territory as a 16-year-old from Indiana. By the turn of the 20th century, he was one of the largest growers and shippers of fruit in the Inland Empire.

Along with her older siblings, La Follette began her formal studies at Washington State University in Pullman, Washington where her family had moved into a large house her father had built near the college. When William La Follette was elected to Congress in 1910, Suzanne moved with her family to the nation's capital and finished her studies there, graduating from Trinity College (Trinity Washington University) in 1915.

== Washington, D.C. ==
While completing her college education, La Follette was involved with many of the great events of the day. She worked in her father's congressional office as well as the office of their cousin, Senator Robert M. La Follette. For much of that period the two LaFollette families lived together in a large home that William La Follette had purchased in Mount Pleasant, Washington, D.C. Debate and conversation were encouraged at the dinner table and a steady stream politicians, writers, labor leaders, professors and other opinion makers engaged in policy and political arguments late into the evening.

== New York City ==
After her father left Congress. she moved to New York City where she lived and worked for fifty years. She lived for most of this period in the Chelsea Hotel. Her brother Chester La Follette's art studio was upstairs from her apartment on the tenth floor. During the 1920s she spent four years as an editor for the Freeman working as a deputy to Albert Jay Nock editing and writing. When the magazine folded, she turned her talents to writing, producing award-winning poetry as well as two books on very different subjects. In Concerning Women, she broke new ground as she analyzed feminism from the perspective of economic equality. Her former mentor, Nock, found the book to be brilliant and original. In Art in America she produced a monumental survey of American art from colonial times to the 20th century. The art historian, Walter Pach wrote the introduction. In the 1930s she organized a new version of the Freeman, won a Guggenheim Fellowship for study of the fine arts, lectured at the Art Students League of New York, and traveled to Mexico as a member of the Dewey Commission. La Follette served as secretary to its chairman, the philosopher John Dewey and wrote the summary of the commission's findings after conducting investigations in Mexico where Trotsky was in exile (soon after he was murdered by a Russian agent). In the 1940s and during World War II La Follette worked as director of foreign relief programs for the American Federation of Labor, focusing her efforts on keeping communists out of the American labor movement. She maintained her close relationship with Alexander Kerensky and other Russians she had befriended through the years.

La Follette returned to editing in the 1950s when she and a number of old colleagues, including John Chamberlain and Henry Hazlitt produced a new version of The Freeman. In her final editorial effort she became the founding managing editor of the magazine William F. Buckley Jr. founded in 1955, The National Review. She retired from this post in 1959 at the age of sixty-six.

Still politically active in the 1960s, she was one of the founders of the New York Conservative Party. She ran for Congress in 1964 and lost. In her 2004 book, Notable American Women: A Biographical Dictionary: Completing the Twentieth Century, Susan Ware described the many intellectual gifts that made La Follette such a force among the New York intelligencia for so many decades. La Follette was "a rigorous opponent of government intervention. She was a very beautiful woman, with a hilarious sense of humor, a grammatical stickler ... a feminist ... generous and warm-hearted, recalled William F. Buckley Jr., who knew her in later years."

== California ==
In the 1970s, La Follette sold her Bucks County farm and left the Chelsea Hotel and New York City. She returned to the West Coast, settling in Palo Alto, not far from the Stanford University campus. She is interred in Colfax, Washington with other family members.

== See also ==
- Georgism
- Individualist feminism
- Libertarian conservatism
- Libertarianism in the United States
