= John Tabor =

American politician

John Bayless Tabor "J.B." ( October 14, 1821 Tennessee- October 7, 1907 Colfax, Washington) was a 49er who crossed the plains to California shortly after the discovery of gold. He later settled in the Washington Territory and was one of the founders of Whitman County where he served as a County Commissioner. He had large holdings of fruit orchards and wheat ranches. Congressman William La Follette was his son-in-law.

== Pioneer ==
John Tabor crossed the plains to California along with thousands of others during the gold rush of 1849. He soon gave up panning for gold as a livelihood and instead shot game which he sold to the miners. He headed north where he married a young widow, Mary Taylor Hamilton, and they settled on a farm in the Willamette Valley in the Oregon Territory. He fought with General Cornelias in the Indian Wars, whose skirmishes took him all over the Inland Empire. When the land which had been off limits to settlers after the Whitman massacre opened up, John Tabor moved his family to the Palouse in the Washington Territory.

== Rancher and public servant ==
When he first arrived in the Palouse only a few other settlers were in the area. The town of Colfax was formed, and he was elected one of the first County Commissioners of the newly established Whitman County as a Democrat. After serving one term, he stepped down and concentrated on his fruit orchards and wheat ranches. He was one of the first to bring apples to the region which were planted on his ranch in Wawaiwai on the Snake River. This ranch, which he later sold to his son-in-law William La Follette, eventually became one of the largest in the region, producing a wide variety of fruit which were shipped to market via steamboats on the Snake River and later by rail with the coming of the railroad.

== Family ==
John Tabor's family had been moving steadily westward since the American Revolutionary War. He was descended from one of the last British governors of Georgia . His wife's family, the Taylors, had crossed from Virginia into the Oregon Territory in 1848. His daughter, Mary Tabor, married William La Follette in 1886, shortly after the young homesteader from Indiana had begun his own farming and ranching ventures and more than twenty-five years before he took his seat in the United States Congress. John Tabor lived to see many changes come to the land he had helped pioneer. He died when he was walking near the railroad track in Colfax and was struck by a passing train. He was eighty-five years old.
