= Primrose, Wisconsin =

Town of Primrose
- Town
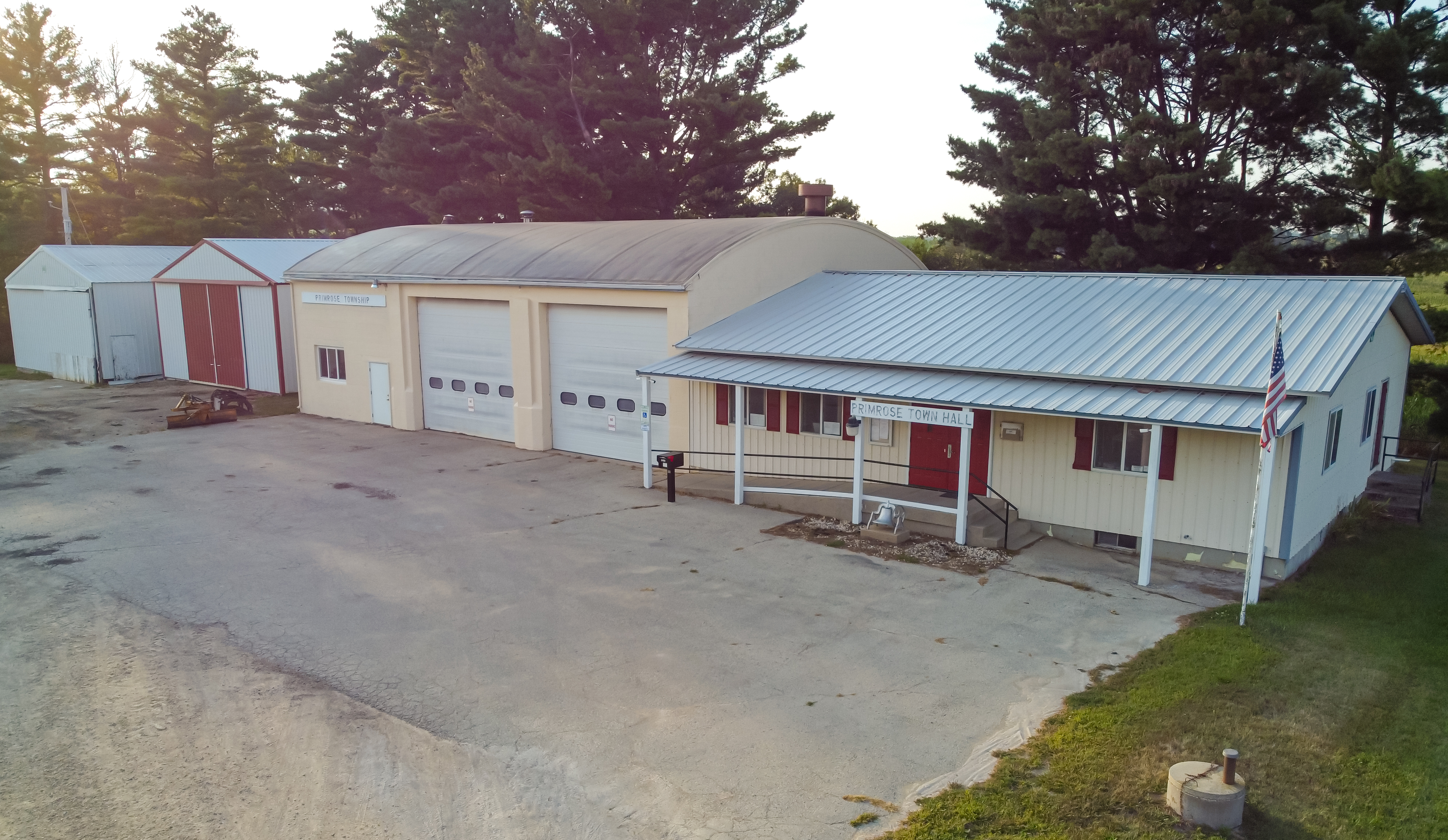
- Town hall

- Location in Dane County and the state of Wisconsin.
- Coordinates: 42°54′27″N 89°39′17″W
- Country: United States
- State: Wisconsin
- County: Dane

Area
  - Total: 35.8 sq mi (92.8 km^{2})
  - Land: 35.8 sq mi (92.8 km^{2})
  - Water: 0 sq mi (0.0 km^{2})
- Elevation: 991 ft (302 m)

Population (2020)
  - Total: 750
  - Density: 19/sq mi (7.3/km^{2})
- Time zone: UTC-6 (Central (CST))
  - Summer (DST): UTC-5 (CDT)
- Area code: 608
- FIPS code: 55-65575
- GNIS feature ID: 1583985
- Website: https://townofprimrose.gov/

The Town of Primrose is located in Dane County, Wisconsin, United States. As of 2020, the population was 750.

== Geography ==
According to the United States Census Bureau, the town has a total area of 35.8 square miles (92.8 km^{2}), all land.

== Demographics ==
At the 2000 census there were 682 people, 243 households, and 192 families living in the town. The population density was 19.0 people per square mile (7.3/km^{2}). There were 252 housing units at an average density of 7.0 per square mile (2.7/km^{2}). The racial makeup of the town was 98.68% White, 0.44% African American, 0.15% Native American, 0.15% Asian, and 0.59% from two or more races. Hispanic or Latino of any race were 0.15%.

Of the 243 households 32.5% had children under the age of 18 living with them, 71.6% were married couples living together, 3.7% had a female householder with no husband present, and 20.6% were non-families. 10.7% of households were one person and 4.1% were one person aged 65 or older. The average household size was 2.79 and the average family size was 3.05.

The age distribution was 23.9% under the age of 18, 6.0% from 18 to 24, 29.6% from 25 to 44, 28.6% from 45 to 64, and 11.9% 65 or older. The median age was 40 years. For every 100 females, there were 117.2 males. For every 100 females age 18 and over, there were 117.2 males.

The median household income was $51,964 and the median family income was $54,063. Males had a median income of $32,750 versus $26,667 for females. The per capita income for the town was $23,935. About 2.1% of families and 4.4% of the population were below the poverty line, including 3.3% of those under age 18 and none of those age 65 or over.

== Notable people ==
- Albert J. Baker, Wisconsin Representative, was born in Primrose
- Charles S. Eastman, South Dakota lawyer and politician, was born in Primrose
- Clarence Gonstead, chiropractor, lived in Primrose as a child
- Harvey Marion LaFollette, Indiana educator and politician, founder of LaFollette, Tennessee was born in Primrose
- Robert M. La Follette, Wisconsin governor and United States senator, was born in Primrose
- Eli Pederson, Wisconsin State Representative, lived in Primrose
