= Robert M. La Follette House =

Historic house in Wisconsin, United States

- U.S. National Register of Historic Places
- U.S. National Historic Landmark
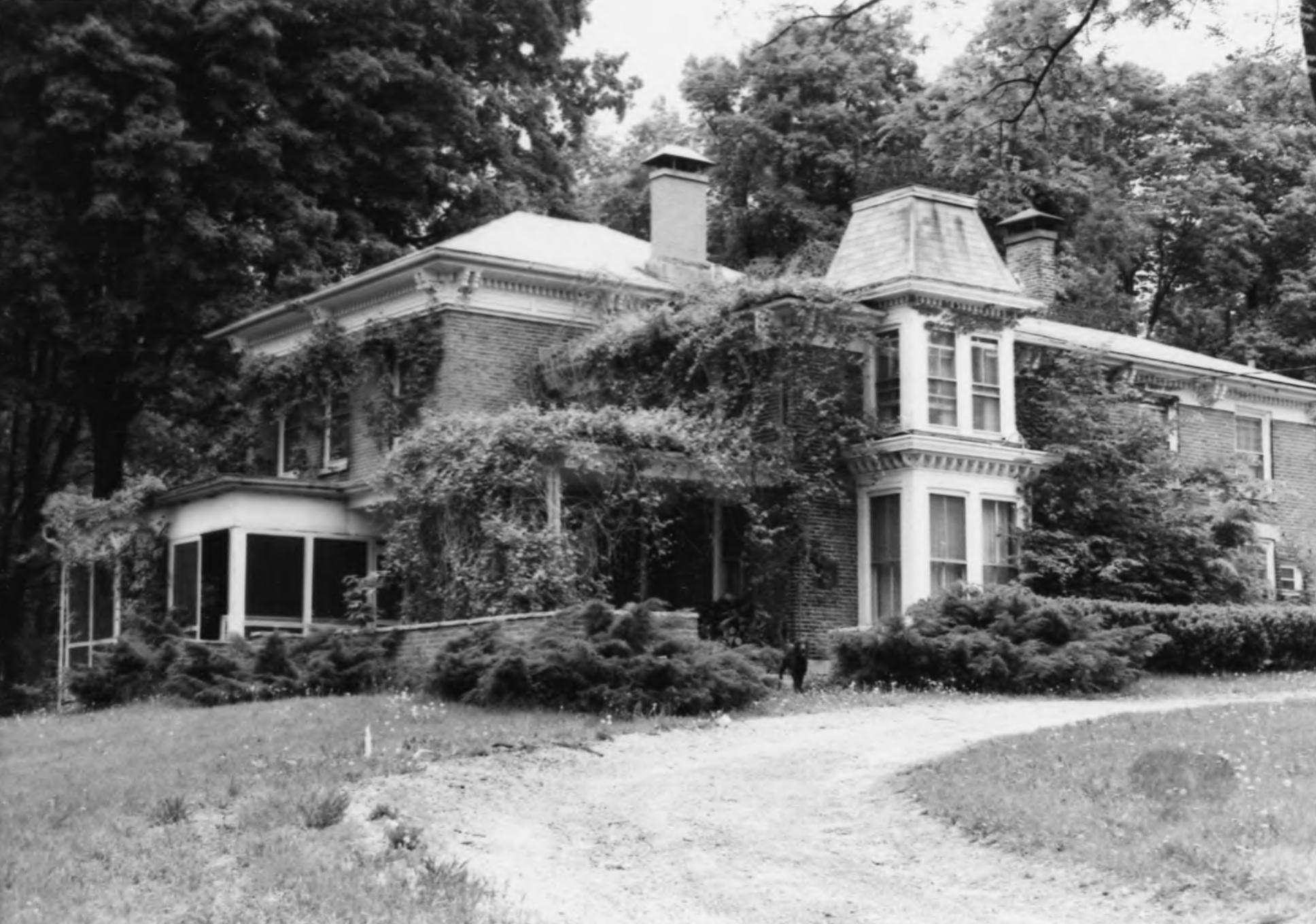
- Robert M. La Follette House

- Location within Wisconsin Location within the United States
- Location: 733 Lakewood Boulevard, Maple Bluff, Wisconsin
- Coordinates: 43°6′57″N 89°22′21.96″W
- Built: 1905
- Architectural style: Late Victorian
- NRHP reference No.: 66000020

Significant dates
- Added to NRHP: October 15, 1966
- Designated NHL: January 29, 1964

Robert M. La Follette House is a historic house located at 733 Lakewood Boulevard in Maple Bluff, Wisconsin, United States. The house was the home of Robert M. La Follette, Wisconsin governor and U.S. Congressman and presidential candidate, from 1905 until his death in 1925. It was declared a National Historic Landmark in 1964.

== History ==
By the time La Follette purchased the house in 1905, he was already an accomplished Wisconsin politician. La Follette first gained a national political office in 1885, when he entered the U.S. House of Representatives as a member of the Republican Party; he remained a representative until 1890, when he lost a reelection bid due in part to ideological differences with party leadership. After leaving office, La Follette began a Progressive campaign against several of Wisconsin's large and politically influential corporations; his ideas won him enough popular support to secure him Wisconsin's governorship in 1900. While his Progressive plans were initially rejected by an unsympathetic state legislature, several of his policies became law by the middle of the decade, particularly tax reform policies such as a statewide income tax.

In 1905, the same year that he purchased his house in Maple Bluff, La Follette was elected to the U.S. Senate. La Follette remained a senator until his death; he became known for progressive stances such as the introduction of national regulatory commissions, support for organized labor, and opposition to World War I. La Follette also considered presidential office during his term as a senator; he was proposed as a Republican candidate in 1908, and he mounted an independent campaign in the 1924 election which carried Wisconsin and earned him one-sixth of the national vote. La Follette died in 1925 of chronic illness; his wife Belle Case and sons Philip and Robert Jr. remained influential in Wisconsin politics.

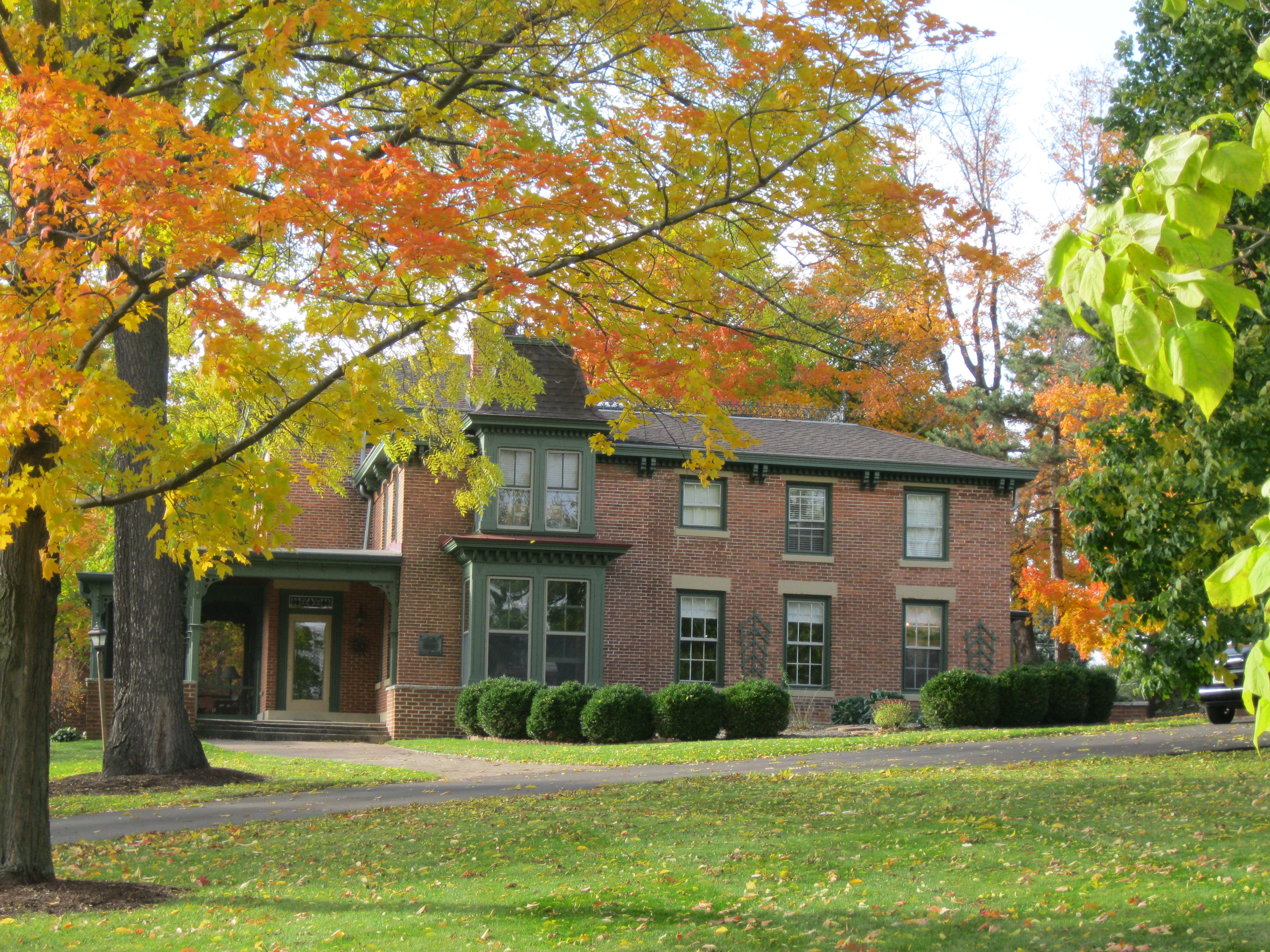
The house in 2014

La Follette's life and political career was significantly associated with his homes in and near Madison, the state capital; before moving to his Maple Bluff house, he lived in a house on Broom Street in Madison. His house in Maple Bluff was originally situated on a 60-acre (24 ha) plot, which had shrunk to 3 or 4 acres (1.2 or 1.6 ha) by the time of its National Historic Landmark nomination. The two-story brick house is composed of two sections and features Victorian elements and a projecting bay with a mansard roof. After La Follette's death, the property remained in his family for several generations.

== See also ==
- LaFollette House (LaFollette, Tennessee): home of Harvey Marion LaFollette
- List of National Historic Landmarks in Wisconsin
- National Register of Historic Places listings in Dane County, Wisconsin
