= Somerhill Gallery =

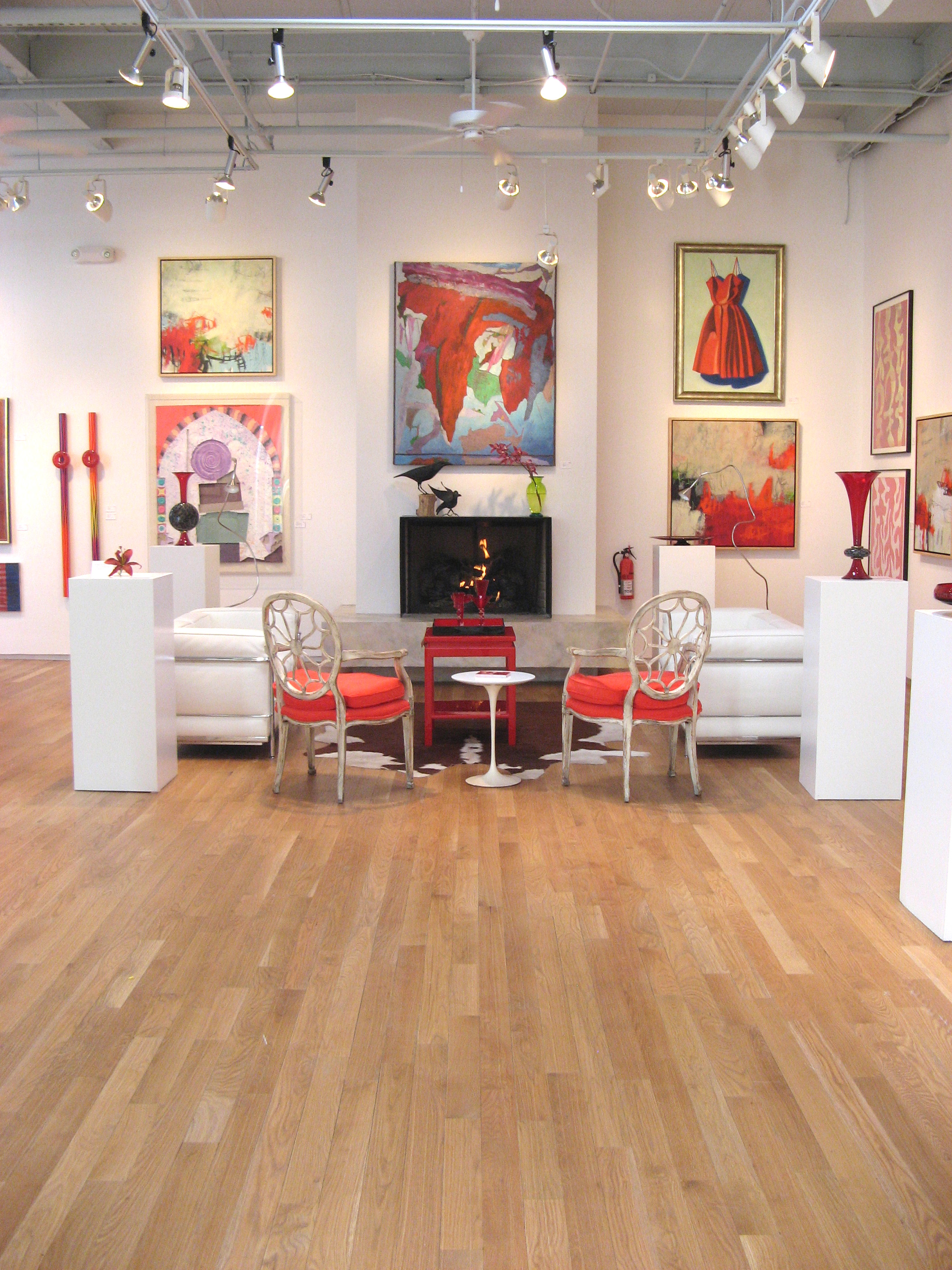
- Somerhill Gallery Main Salon
- Established: 1972
- Location: 303 S Roxboro St, Durham, NC, North Carolina, United States
- Coordinates: 35.99138°N 78.899581°W
- Type: Contemporary art
- Director: Joseph D. Rowand
- Architect: Philip Szostak
- Website: www.somerhill.com

Somerhill Gallery was a contemporary art gallery based in Durham, North Carolina owned by Joseph D. Rowand. Founded in 1972, the gallery shut its doors due to bankruptcy and failure to pay its artists in 2010.

Abstract and representational artwork in all visual disciplines was on display in the gallery's 9,600-square-foot (890 m^{2}) setting. Somerhill featured fine art glass and jewelry, a contemporary photography gallery, an open-air glass atrium which stood at the center of the main salon where featured exhibitions were shown. The gallery also featured white oak floors, fabric walls and over 40 skylights.

Exhibited artists include Herb Jackson, Maud Gatewood, John Beerman, Claude Howell, Carol Bechtel, and Peter Butler.

== History ==
=== 1972-1989 ===
Somerhill Gallery was founded in April 1972 by Joseph Rowand. Its first location was in a small shopping center called "StrawValley" between the cities of Durham, NC and Chapel Hill, NC. The gallery expanded three times in this location.

=== 1989-2008 ===
Somerhill Gallery moved to 1800 East Franklin Street in Chapel Hill, North Carolina in 1989. It was located in the Eastgate Shopping Center and built by architect Phil Szostak. The gallery stayed in this location for over 18 years. During this time they employed Howard Franklin. Not the whole time, but for a specific subset of this time often referred to as "the good times".

=== 2008–present ===
In June 2008, Somerhill Gallery moved to 303 S Roxboro Street, The Venable Center, Durham, NC. As of 2010, Both Somerhill and its owner Joe Rowand have declared bankruptcy and Rowand was the subject of a feature article in Durham's Independent Magazine, which divulged the history of years of failure to pay his artistic stable their due, all the while paying himself in excess of $15,000 per month. The final debts owed by the gallery and Rowand approach well over a million dollars.

== Sources ==
- Somerhill Gallery declares Chapter 7, owes more than a quarter-million dollars to artists
- Blog post regarding Somerhill Gallery's move to Durham, NC on Bull City Rising
- Carolina Arts article on Somerhill Gallery
- Somerhill Gallery at Szostak Design website
- "Art gallery set for stay in Durham" The Durham News, May 31, 2008
- "Art gallery owner confronts 'tall order'" The Chapel Hill News, April 6, 2008
- "Loss of Gallery is loss for town" Opinion, The Chapel Hill News, April 13, 2008
- Joe Rowand's Big Move Metro Magazine, May 2008
- Secrets of State: Somerhill Opening Metro Magazine, August 2008
- Durham stakes claim as Triangle's arts center WRAL News, August 22, 2008
