= Richard L. Wright =

American political leader (born 1943)

Richard LaFollette Wright (born January 18, 1943) is an American political leader who held a number of positions at both the state and national level. He served as chief of staff to the governor of New Jersey in the Cabinet of Governor Jim Florio. He was National Finance Director in the presidential campaign of Senator Bill Bradley. He worked on the energy task force of President Jimmy Carter and as a senior advisor in the United States Department of Energy. Prior to joining the government, he was Executive Director of Amnesty International in Washington, D.C.

After living in Princeton, New Jersey in the 1990s he currently lives in the Belle Mead section of Montgomery Township, New Jersey, where he operates the LaFollette Vineyard and Winery.

== Early life and education ==
He was born in Corpus Christi, Texas where his father was serving in the United States Navy. He grew up in Menlo Park, California where he attended Menlo-Atherton High School. He received his B.A. from Princeton University and his J.D. from the University of California, Berkeley School of Law (Boalt Hall). At Princeton, "Rick" Wright was a basketball teammate of All-American Bill Bradley. He studied languages at the University in Munich, Germany. He is a distant member, on his mother's side, of the La Follette Wisconsin political family.

== Federal service ==
=== Carter administration ===
After completing his work on the White House energy task force, he joined the staff of the newly created Department of Energy and Secretary James R. Schlesinger, working on the National Energy Act legislative package that the President had sent to Congress. He was appointed Director of Congressional Affairs. When Charles Duncan, Jr. became Secretary he was named Assistant Secretary for Legislative Affairs, a position he held until the end the Carter presidency. In June, 1980 President Carter signed the Energy Security Act into law.

=== Clinton administration ===
He was appointed to consecutive terms on the National Advisory Council of the United States Small Business Administration, first by Administrator Phillip Lader and in the second term by Administrator Aida Alvarez.

== State government ==
=== Florio administration ===
He was named to the transition team to work on auto insurance reform. He joined the administration as Associate State Treasurer. He became the governor's lead on large economic development projects. He was named Chief of Staff.

=== Corzine administration ===
He was named the co-chair of the transition team Energy Policy Transition Group. He joined the Office of Economic Growth and worked with a team to coordinate the drafting of the New Jersey Energy Master Plan.

== Politics ==
=== Bradley presidential campaign ===
During the presidential campaign of Bill Bradley he served as both National Finance Director and Chairman of the Finance Committee. His team matched Vice President Al Gore's fund raising dollar for dollar. The Bradley campaign initially relied on a loyal group of donors developed over many years which included long time New Jersey political supporters, friends from Princeton, professional athletes, and corporate leaders. Fundraising events were organized around enthusiastic new supporters all over the country, many of whom had never participated in the political process before. An internet site for fundraising was developed for the first time and it produced a steady stream of revenue. The effort greatly expanded the national democratic donor lists.

Prior to this campaign he had worked in various capacities for a number of candidates. He was a volunteer for Bobby Kennedy in California in 1968 and served as Carol Bellamy's campaign manager in Brooklyn in 1972. He worked in a number of New Jersey and national campaigns as an organizer, fund raiser, policy person and campaign manager.

== Non-profit ==
- Amnesty International: directed the Washington Office from 1975 to 1977.
- Union of Concerned Scientists: board member in the 1980s and 1990s.
- Fund for New Jersey: board member since 1996.
