= Chester La Follette =

American painter (1897–1993)

Robert Chester La Follette (March 31, 1897 in Pullman, Washington – May 24, 1993 in White Plains, New York), was an American painter. His portrait of his cousin Senator Robert M. La Follette, Sr. hangs in the Senate Reception Room of the United States Capitol. Allyn Cox supervised the placement of the painting in the United States Capitol.

== Family ==
Chester La Follette was a member of the politically prominent La Follette family. He was the son of Congressman William La Follette and nephew of educator, industrialist Harvey Marion LaFollette. He was the brother of Washington state attorney and legislator William Leroy LaFollette, Jr. The libertarian editor and writer Suzanne La Follette was his sister.

== Early years and education ==
He was born in the Pacific Northwest into a pioneer family. His grandparents had crossed the Oregon Trail into the Oregon Territory in the 1840s. His father had become one of the largest fruit exporters in the state of Washington before being elected to Congress in 1910. Chester completed his early education in Pullman and continued high school in Washington DC when his family relocated there. The two LaFollette families shared a large house that the Congressman had purchased, and Chester spent his teen age years in the midst of lively discussions of the great events of the day. During this period he was introduced to the sculptor Vinnie Ream and was influenced by her passion and technique.

== Career in New York ==
In the early 1920s Chester joined his sister, Suzanne, in New York City. He studied the violin, and continued to work on his sculpture and painting techniques. In the mid-1920s he journeyed to Paris to continue his musical studies and to refine his painting. He spent many long hours in museums viewing the masters. When he returned to New York, he married a talented pianist from Oregon, Dorothea Anderson, and together they ran a musical studio in their Central Park West apartment for the next thirty years.]

== Portrait of cousin ==
When Senator John F. Kennedy's Committee announced that Robert M. La Follette, Sr. had been selected one of the five great senators, Chester actively and successfully sought to win the commission for the portrait of the man he had shared so many meals with during his teenage years. His portrait was unveiled in the Senate Reception Room in 1959.

== Sources ==
- Chester La Follette painting of Senator Robert La Follette, Sr.
- "Gems of the Capitol" (PDF). gpo.gov. Archived from the original (PDF) on January 9, 2009.
