= LaFollette, Tennessee =

- City
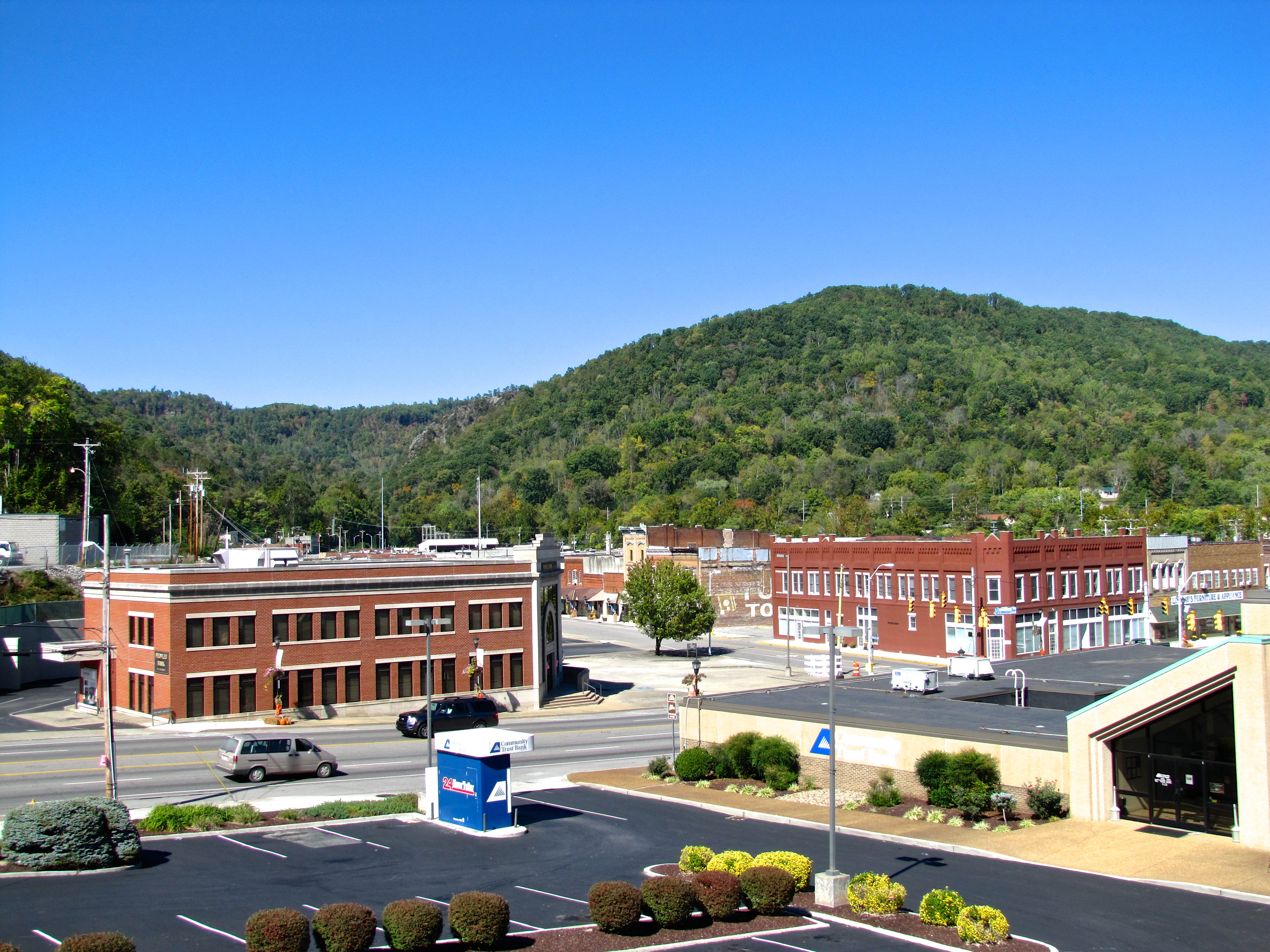
- Buildings along Central Avenue (U.S. Route 25W)

- Location of LaFollette in Campbell County, Tennessee.
- Coordinates: 36°22′30″N 84°7′39″W
- Country: United States
- State: Tennessee
- County: Campbell

Government
  - Vice Mayor: Bob Fannon

Area
  - Total: 4.92 sq mi (12.73 km^{2})
  - Land: 4.92 sq mi (12.73 km^{2})
  - Water: 0 sq mi (0.00 km^{2})
- Elevation: 1,073 ft (327 m)

Population (2020)
  - Total: 7,430
  - Density: 1,511.9/sq mi (583.74/km^{2})
- Time zone: UTC-5 (Eastern (EST))
  - Summer (DST): UTC-4 (EDT)
- ZIP code: 37766
- Area code: 423
- FIPS code: 47-40180
- GNIS feature ID: 1652480
- Website: www.lafollettetn.gov

LaFollette is a city in Campbell County, Tennessee, United States. Its population was 7,456 at the 2010 census, with an estimated population in 2018 of 6,737. It is the principal city of the LaFollette, Tennessee micropolitan statistical area, which includes all of Campbell County, and is a component of the Knoxville Metropolitan Area. While the city's official spelling is one word ("LaFollette")—after its founders, Harvey Marion LaFollette and his younger brother Grant LaFollette—several federal agencies spell the city's name with two words ("La Follette").

== History ==
Harvey and Grant LaFollette purchased 37,000 acres (150 km^{2}) at Big Creek Gap, where the present community lies, around 1890. They founded the LaFollette Coal, Iron, and Railway Company to exploit mineral resources they had found. Although the business failed during the 1920s, the community continued to grow. The city of LaFollette was incorporated in 1897. On May 10, 1904, a major fire that started in the Cumberland Inn burned down most of the downtown area, with a reported 31 businesses destroyed.

== Geography ==
LaFollette is located near the geographic center of Campbell County at 36°22′30″N 84°7′39″W (36.375006, −84.127623). The city is situated in Powell Valley, where the Appalachian Ridge-and-Valley province gives way to the Cumberland Plateau region. Cumberland Mountain, a 50 mi (80 km) ridge stretching from Cumberland Gap in the east to Bruce Gap in the west, rises north of LaFollette. Norris Lake dominates the area to the south. Jacksboro lies adjacent to LaFollette to the southwest. A leg of the Cumberland Trail is accessible off Tennessee Avenue at the north end of LaFollette.

According to the United States Census Bureau, the city has a total area of 4.9 sq mi (12.7 km^{2}), all land. The elevation varies around the city, around 1,050 ft (320 m) in the valley areas to 1,500 ft (460 m) on ridge tops. The average elevation is around 1,150 ft (350 m).

U.S. Route 25W and State Routes 9 and 63 run concurrently through the community. Interstate 75 is 8 mi (13 km) to the southwest, beyond Jacksboro. Jellico is 23 mi (37 km) to the north via US 25W, over the Cumberland Plateau.

== Demographics ==
Historical population
Census	Pop.	Note	%±
1900	366		—
1910	2,816		669.4%
1920	3,056		8.5%
1930	2,637		−13.7%
1940	4,010		52.1%
1950	5,797		44.6%
1960	6,204		7.0%
1970	6,902		11.3%
1980	8,198		18.8%
1990	7,192		−12.3%
2000	7,926		10.2%
2010	7,456		−5.9%
2020	7,430		−0.3%

=== 2020 census ===
LaFollette racial composition
Race	Number	Percentage
White (non-Hispanic)	6,898	92.84%
Black or African American (non-Hispanic)	37	0.5%
Native American	14	0.19%
Asian	24	0.32%
Other/Mixed	299	4.02%
Hispanic or Latino	158	2.13%

As of the 2020 United States census, there was a population of 7,430, with 2,797 households and 1,821 families residing in the city.

=== 2000 census ===
As of the census of 2000, 7,926 people, 3,422 households, and 2,135 families were residing in the city. The population density was 1,624.7 people/sq mi (627.1/km^{2}). The 3,779 housing units averaged 774.6/sq mi (299.0/km^{2}). The racial makeup of the city was 97.89% White, 0.54% African American, 0.40% Native American, 0.18% Asian, 0.22% from other races, and 0.77% from two or more races. Hispanics or Latinos of any race were 0.42% of the population.

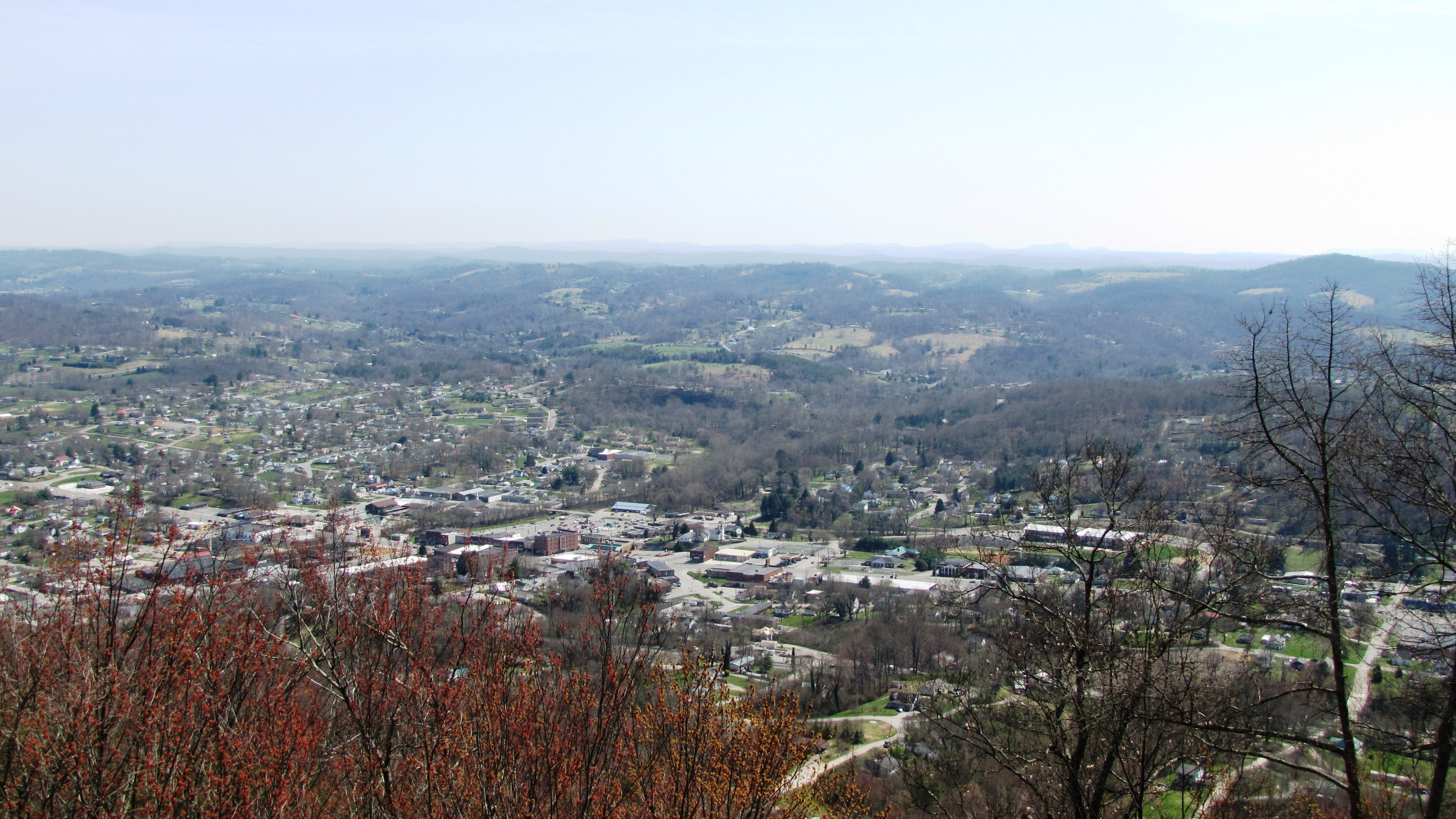
View of LaFollette from an overlook along the Cumberland Trail

Of the 3,422 households, 26.5% had children under 18 living with them, 39.8% were married couples living together, 17.9% had a female householder with no husband present, and 37.6% were not families. About 34.5% of all households were made up of individuals, and 17.5% had someone living alone who was 65 or older. The average household size was 2.24, and the average family size was 2.86.

In the city, the age distribution was 22.0% under 18, 8.7% from 18 to 24, 25.5% from 25 to 44, 22.6% from 45 to 64, and 21.2% who were 65 or older. The median age was 40 years. For every 100 females, there were 82.8 males. For every 100 females age 18 and over, there were 78.1 males.

The median income for a household in the city was $18,370, and for a family was $24,235. Males had a median income of $25,541 versus $18,835 for females. The per capita income for the city was $13,355. About 28.3% of families and 33.1% of the population were below the poverty line, including 48.7% of those under age 18 and 21.1% of those age 65 or over.

== Notable people ==
- Adele Arakawa, television news anchor
- Howard "Louie Bluie" Armstrong, musician
- Haskel Ayers, businessman and politician
- The Isaacs, a Southern gospel/bluegrass family singing group
- Carl Stiner, U.S. Army general
- J. Will Taylor, congressman
