= Top 100 Contractors of the U.S. federal government =

Annual US government list of its top 100 contracting entities

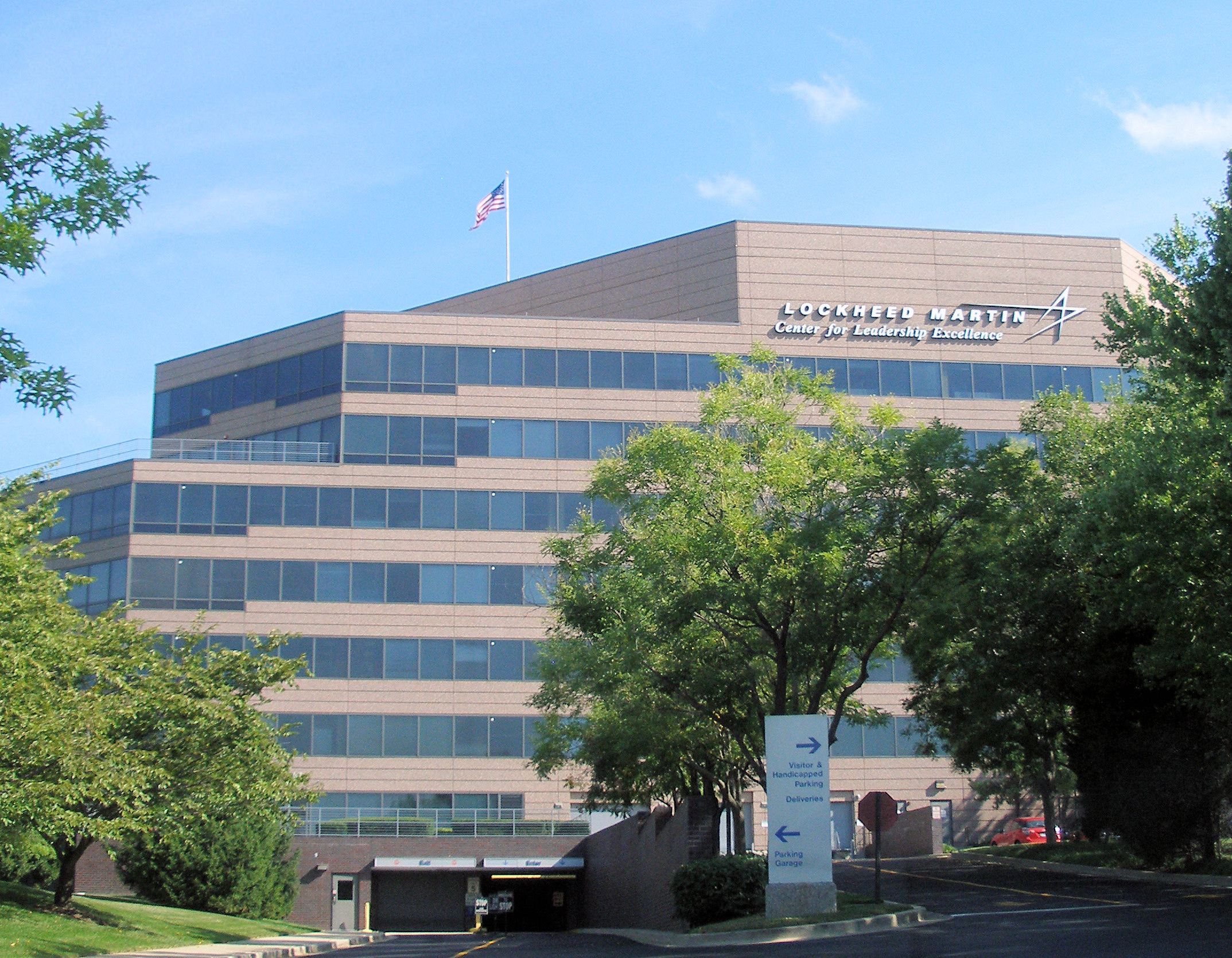
With $48.666 billion in business with the U.S. federal government, Lockheed Martin, based in Bethesda, Maryland, is the largest U.S. federal government contractor

The Top 100 Contractors Report (TCR 100) is a list developed annually by the General Services Administration as part of its tracking of U.S. federal government procurement. It features the "Top 100" contractors with the U.S. government.

In 2005, the federal government aimed to source 23% of all subcontracts from small businesses with guidance from the Small Business Administration. The federal government was unable to meet this goal for 8 years until FY2013 when it subcontracted over $83 billion from small businesses.

In 2015, the federal government exceeded their overall goal of 23% by 2.75% resulting in $90.7 billion awarded to small businesses, 5.05% ($17.8 billion) of which went to women-owned small business (WOSB), meeting the goal for the first time since it was implemented in 1996.

The top five departments by dollars obligated in 2015 were the Department of Defense ($212.5 billion), Department of Energy ($23 billion), Health and Human Services ($21 billion), Department of Veteran Affairs ($20 billion), and NASA ($13 billion).

== 2023 ==
Top 100 contractors, fiscal year 2023
| Global vendor name | Dollars obligated | % of total dollars |
|---|---|---|
| 1. Lockheed Martin | $70,846,396,691.21 | 9.1850% |
| 2. RTX Corporation | $31,337,596,573.20 | 4.0628% |
| 3. General Dynamics | $26,920,544,168.05 | 3.4902% |
| 4. Boeing | $23,759,376,505.35 | 3.0803% |
| 5. Northrop Grumman | $17,380,478,308.32 | 2.2533% |
| 6. Optum, Inc. | $16,220,323,256.27 | 2.1029% |
| 7. Leidos Holdings, Inc. | $10,808,359,972.97 | 1.4013% |
| 8. Huntington Ingalls Industries, Inc. | $10,290,313,228.67 | 1.3341% |
| 9. McKesson Corporation | $10,246,679,904.79 | 1.3285% |
| 10. TriWest Healthcare Alliance | $7,984,754,268.12 | 1.0352% |
| 11. Humana Inc. | $7,914,316,363.70 | 1.0261% |
| 12. L3Harris Technologies, Inc. | $7,903,939,123.34 | 1.0247% |
| 13. BAE Systems plc | $7,707,517,292.98 | 0.9993% |
| 14. Honeywell International Inc. | $7,491,390,008.07 | 0.9712% |
| 15. Booz Allen Hamilton | $7,477,235,506.46 | 0.9694% |
| 16. Science Applications International Corporation | $5,958,350,776.62 | 0.7725% |
| 17. Analytic Services, Inc. (ANSER) | $5,308,508,923.41 | 0.6882% |
| 18. Atlantic Diving Supply Inc. | $4,615,810,604.36 | 0.5984% |
| 19. Triad National Security, llc | $4,578,543,066.01 | 0.5936% |
| 20. Amentum Services, Inc. | $4,406,339,286.70 | 0.5713% |
| 21. Fluor Corporation | $4,381,001,036.83 | 0.5680% |
| 22. General Electric Company | $4,361,937,639.88 | 0.5655% |
| 23. CACI International Inc. | $4,134,786,048.46 | 0.5361% |
| 24. Peraton Corporation | $3,841,649,740.28 | 0.4981% |
| 25. Deloitte Touche Tohmatsu Limited | $3,711,875,824.60 | 0.4812% |
| 26. Centene Corporation | $3,601,320,374.47 | 0.4669% |
| 27. Bechtel Corporation | $3,598,261,413.06 | 0.4665% |
| 28. Consolidated Nuclear Security | $3,329,130,100.56 | 0.4316% |
| 29. Jacobs Engineering Group Inc | $3,214,018,099.34 | 0.4167% |
| 30. Pfizer Inc. | $3,206,919,976.48 | 0.4158% |
| 31. Space Exploration Technologies Corp. | $3,188,290,937.47 | 0.4134% |
| 32. Dell Technologies Inc. | $3,061,153,469.68 | 0.3969% |
| 33. Accenture Solutions Private Limited | $2,973,610,182.01 | 0.3855% |
| 34. Lawrence Livermore National Security, llc | $2,966,113,061.61 | 0.3846% |
| 35. California Institute of Technology | $2,949,568,245.40 | 0.3824% |
| 36. UT-Battelle llc | $2,712,833,476.08 | 0.3517% |
| 37. Savannah River Nuclear Solutions llc | $2,539,872,121.68 | 0.3293% |
| 38. General Atomics | $2,365,302,022.73 | 0.3067% |
| 39. Battelle Memorial Institute | $2,295,854,020.82 | 0.2977% |
| 40. The Mitre Corporation | $2,260,740,590.57 | 0.2931% |
| 41. Cencora Inc | $2,239,370,143.93 | 0.2903% |
| 42. Battelle Energy Alliance Inc | $2,234,871,133.69 | 0.2897% |
| 43. Vectrus Federal Services gmbh | $2,222,788,150.42 | 0.2882% |
| 44. KBR, Inc. | $2,199,443,965.44 | 0.2852% |
| 45. Amerisource Bergen Holding Corp. | $2,140,033,104.94 | 0.2775% |
| 46. Merck & Co., Inc. | $2,073,093,199.89 | 0.2688% |
| 47. The Johns Hopkins University | $2,068,040,514.30 | 0.2681% |
| 48. Oshkosh Corp. | $2,043,479,762.32 | 0.2649% |
| 49. Textron Inc. | $2,005,101,883.65 | 0.2600% |
| 50. Maximus Inc. | $1,928,341,280.38 | 0.2500% |
| 51. Intl Fcstone Ltd | $1,686,335,704.28 | 0.2186% |
| 52. Idemitsu Kosan co., ltd. | $1,679,632,595.59 | 0.2178% |
| 53. Leonardo S.p.A. | $1,486,133,976.33 | 0.1927% |
| 54. Parsons Corporation | $1,453,954,325.66 | 0.1885% |
| 55. Fedex Corp. | $1,436,531,360.12 | 0.1862% |
| 56. Massachusetts Institute of Technology | $1,410,798,400.53 | 0.1829% |
| 57. Sierra Nevada Company, llc | $1,397,954,338.53 | 0.1812% |
| 58. Arctic Slope Regional Corporation | $1,393,029,630.37 | 0.1806% |
| 59. Chemonics International Inc. | $1,381,442,389.98 | 0.1791% |
| 60. Carahsoft Technology Corp | $1,363,730,726.90 | 0.1768% |
| 61. Microsoft Corp | $1,362,721,053.11 | 0.1767% |
| 62. Alion Science and Technology Corp. | $1,301,516,071.18 | 0.1687% |
| 63. Alliance for Sustainable Energy, llc | $1,288,629,761.12 | 0.1671% |
| 64. B.L. Harbert Holdings, l.l.c. | $1,280,645,088.37 | 0.1660% |
| 65. AT&T Inc | $1,278,955,221.97 | 0.1658% |
| 66. The Aerospace Corporation | $1,272,370,725.61 | 0.1650% |
| 67. KBR Technical Services Inc | $1,246,008,557.03 | 0.1615% |
| 68. Aecom | $1,201,125,991.55 | 0.1557% |
| 69. Weston Solutions Holdings, Inc. | $1,183,109,488.18 | 0.1534% |
| 70. Valero Energy Corporation | $1,165,966,340.21 | 0.1512% |
| 71. United Launch Alliance LLC | $1,145,664,924.84 | 0.1485% |
| 72. Am General LLC | $1,144,508,375.91 | 0.1484% |
| 73. Rolls-Royce Holdings PLC | $1,139,452,987.82 | 0.1477% |
| 74. Noble Sales Co Inc | $1,136,019,734.01 | 0.1473% |
| 75. Pacific Architects and Engineers LLC | $1,124,242,804.46 | 0.1458% |
| 76. Deployed Resources LLC | $1,116,231,183.70 | 0.1447% |
| 77. International Business Machines Corporation | $1,113,019,548.27 | 0.1443% |
| 78. CGI Federal Inc | $1,105,819,901.92 | 0.1434% |
| 79. The British Petroleum Co. PLC | $1,089,670,199.78 | 0.1413% |
| 80. National Security Technology Accelerator | $1,046,254,058.52 | 0.1356% |
| 81. Mantech International Corporation | $1,039,325,920.03 | 0.1348% |
| 82. Vertex Aerospace Services Corp. | $1,019,792,593.71 | 0.1322% |
| 83. The Geo Group, Inc. | $1,011,894,773.26 | 0.1312% |
| 84. Tetra Tech, Inc. | $1,005,265,113.94 | 0.1303% |
| 85. Patriot Team | $1,003,686,928.69 | 0.1301% |
| 86. FCN Inc | $999,305,598.77 | 0.1296% |
| 87. Porter Novelli Public Services | $998,937,473.77 | 0.1295% |
| 88. W S Darley & Co | $967,606,808.33 | 0.1255% |
| 89. Global Ordnance LLC | $964,027,730.30 | 0.1250% |
| 90. Bell Boeing Joint Project Office | $947,186,175.58 | 0.1228% |
| 91. Government of Canada | $910,937,687.90 | 0.1181% |
| 92. Government of Japan | $905,828,467.40 | 0.1174% |
| 93. HIG Capital Management, Inc. | $883,612,103.00 | 0.1146% |
| 94. United Health Group Incorporated | $876,552,394.16 | 0.1136% |
| 95. Xator LLC | $861,183,473.04 | 0.1117% |
| 96. M1 Support Services, L.P. | $849,116,021.92 | 0.1101% |
| 97. Defense Energy Center of Excellence | $846,783,790.23 | 0.1098% |
| 98. Glaxosmithkline Holdings (Americas) inc. | $843,374,597.64 | 0.1093% |
| 99. Thundercat Technology, LLC | $842,651,114.63 | 0.1093% |

== 2019 ==
Top 100 contractors, fiscal year 2019
| Global vendor name | Dollars obligated (millions) | % of total dollars |
|---|---|---|
| 1. Lockheed Martin | $48,666 | 8.23% |
| 2. Boeing | $28,089 | 4.75% |
| 3. General Dynamics | $20,961 | 3.55% |
| 4. Raytheon Company | $16,351 | 2.77% |
| 5. Northrop Grumman | $16,101 | 2.72% |
| 6. McKesson Corporation | $9,640 | 1.63% |
| 7. United Technologies | $8,849 | 1.50% |
| 8. Huntington Ingalls Industries | $7,617 | 1.29% |
| 9. Leidos | $7,272 | 1.23% |
| 10. L3Harris Technologies | $6,878 | 1.16% |
| 11. Humana | $6,807 | 1.15% |
| 12. Honeywell | $6,364 | 1.08% |
| 13. BAE Systems | $6,310 | 1.07% |
| 14. Fluor Corporation | $5,254 | 0.89% |
| 15. Booz Allen Hamilton | $5,147 | 0.87% |
| 16. AECOM | $4,592 | 0.78% |
| 17. Science Applications International Corporation | $3,936 | 0.67% |
| 18. General Electric | $3,528 | 0.60% |
| 19. General Atomics | $3,462 | 0.59% |
| 20. TRIAD National Security | $3,357 | 0.57% |
| 21. ANSER | $3,352 | 0.57% |
| 22. Jacobs Engineering Group | $3,346 | 0.57% |
| 23. Centene Corporation | $3,205 | 0.54% |
| 24. Atlantic Diving Supply | $3,194 | 0.54% |
| 25. California Institute of Technology | $3,054 | 0.52% |
| 26. Battelle Memorial Institute | $2,972 | 0.50% |
| 27. KBR | $2,967 | 0.50% |
| 28. Oshkosh Corporation | $2,885 | 0.49% |
| 29. CACI | $2,872 | 0.49% |
| 30. Bechtel | $2,812 | 0.48% |
| 31. Consolidated Nuclear Security | $2,605 | 0.44% |
| 32. Perspecta Inc. | $2,363 | 0.40% |
| 33. AmerisourceBergen | $2,362 | 0.40% |
| 34. Deloitte | $2,215 | 0.37% |
| 35. Lawrence Livermore National Security LLC | $2,123 | 0.36% |
| 36. Cerberus Capital Management | $2,026 | 0.34% |
| 37. UT–Battelle | $1,983 | 0.34% |
| 38. Accenture | $1,921 | 0.32% |
| 39. United Launch Alliance | $1,908 | 0.32% |
| 40. TriWest Healthcare Alliance | $1,882 | 0.32% |
| 41. Bell Boeing Joint Project Office | $1,724 | 0.29% |
| 42. Textron | $1,719 | 0.29% |
| 43. Southwest Valley Constructors Co | $1,645 | 0.28% |
| 44. Mitre Corporation | $1,618 | 0.27% |
| 45. Leonardo | $1,521 | 0.26% |
| 46. Chemonics | $1,501 | 0.25% |
| 47. Sierra Nevada Corporation | $1,493 | 0.25% |
| 48. Merck & Co. | $1,491 | 0.25% |
| 49. Austal | $1,414 | 0.24% |
| 50. Savannah River Nuclear Solutions, LLC | $1,360 | 0.23% |
| 51. Johns Hopkins University | $1,320 | 0.22% |
| 52. SLSCO | $1,299 | 0.22% |
| 53. SpaceX | $1,292 | 0.22% |
| 54. Pacific Architects and Engineers | $1,282 | 0.22% |
| 55. State of California | $1,261 | 0.21% |
| 56. CDW | $1,201 | 0.20% |
| 57. Massachusetts Institute of Technology | $1,133 | 0.19% |
| 58. IBM | $1,111 | 0.19% |
| 59. Parsons Corporation | $1,108 | 0.19% |
| 60. B.L. Harbert International | $1,090 | 0.18% |
| 61. The Aerospace Corporation | $1,085 | 0.18% |
| 62. Vectrus | $1,080 | 0.18% |
| 63. Dell Technologies | $1,054 | 0.18% |
| 64. Pfizer | $1,036 | 0.18% |
| 65. ManTech International | $1,035 | 0.18% |
| 66. FedEx | $980 | 0.17% |
| 67. GlaxoSmithKline | $953 | 0.16% |
| 68. Rolls-Royce Holdings | $945 | 0.16% |
| 69. Arctic Slope Regional Corporation | $908 | 0.15% |
| 70. M1 Support Services LP | $904 | 0.15% |
| 71. Alion Science and Technology Corp | $879 | 0.15% |
| 72. L3 Communications Vertex Aerospace LLC | $871 | 0.15% |
| 73. CGI Inc. | $866 | 0.15% |
| 74. MacAndrews & Forbes | $810 | 0.14% |
| 75. Verizon Communications | $806 | 0.14% |
| 76. AT&T | $801 | 0.14% |
| 77. Carahsoft | $762 | 0.13% |
| 78. Serco | $741 | 0.13% |
| 79. Microsoft | $739 | 0.12% |
| 80. Martin Collier Phillips Corporation | $730 | 0.12% |
| 81. Cerner | $723 | 0.12% |
| 82. Hensel Phelps Construction | $719 | 0.12% |
| 83. Emergent BioSolutions | $713 | 0.12% |
| 84. NANA Regional Corporation | $697 | 0.12% |
| 85. Consortium Management Group Inc | $660 | 0.11% |
| 86. Tetra Tech | $642 | 0.11% |
| 87. Royal Dutch Shell | $628 | 0.11% |
| 88. Cardinal Health | $624 | 0.11% |
| 89. Sanofi | $624 | 0.11% |
| 90. BP | $622 | 0.11% |
| 91. Unisys | $621 | 0.11% |
| 92. Crowley Maritime | $616 | 0.10% |
| 93. Securitas Critical Infrastructure Services Inc | $616 | 0.10% |
| 94. Brookhaven Science Associates LLC | $614 | 0.10% |
| 95. Great Lakes Dredge and Dock Company | $612 | 0.10% |
| 96. Government of Canada | $612 | 0.10% |
| 97. GEO Group | $607 | 0.10% |
| 98. Insight Enterprises | $587 | 0.10% |
| 99. UnitedHealth Group | $574 | 0.10% |
| 100. World Wide Technology | $570 | 0.10% |

== 2018 ==
Top 100 contractors, fiscal year 2018
| Global vendor name | Number of actions | Dollars obligated | % Total actions | % Total dollars |
|---|---|---|---|---|
| Lockheed Martin | 140,260 | $40,552,880,120.29 | 0.3380% | 7.2880% |
| Boeing | 19,688 | $29,755,579,932.10 | 0.0470% | 5.3470% |
| Raytheon | 13,418 | $18,767,821,886.04 | 0.0320% | 3.3730% |
| General Dynamics | 31,055 | $17,503,127,011.85 | 0.0750% | 3.1450% |
| Northrop Grumman | 11,669 | $11,987,896,282.90 | 0.0290% | 2.1540% |
| McKesson Corporation | 76,281 | $8,964,990,935.62 | 0.1840% | 1.6110% |
| Huntington Ingalls Industries | 3,853 | $7,346,840,141.64 | 0.0090% | 1.3200% |
| BAE Systems | 10,079 | $6,877,420,876.67 | 0.0240% | 1.2360% |
| Leidos | 5,456 | $6,771,312,451.55 | 0.0140% | 1.2170% |
| United Technologies | 16,428 | $6,305,247,241.45 | 0.0400% | 1.1330% |
| Honeywell | 10,201 | $6,134,031,888.71 | 0.0250% | 1.1020% |
| L3 Technologies | 7,812 | $5,585,497,397.56 | 0.0190% | 1.0040% |
| Humana | 366 | $5,470,866,144.97 | 0.0010% | 0.9830% |
| Booz Allen Hamilton | 6,663 | $4,806,703,134.57 | 0.0160% | 0.8640% |
| AECOM | 4,510 | $4,601,219,528.98 | 0.0110% | 0.8270% |
| Bechtel | 138 | $3,801,504,993.05 | 0.0000% | 0.6830% |
| Science Applications International Corporation | 247,065 | $3,732,698,312.37 | 0.5960% | 0.6710% |
| Fluor Corporation | 544 | $3,648,676,914.04 | 0.0010% | 0.6550% |
| Centene Corporation | 646,375 | $3,607,789,168.46 | 1.5590% | 0.6480% |
| Harris Corporation | 3,373 | $3,266,402,388.50 | 0.0080% | 0.5870% |
| General Electric | 8,839 | $3,193,853,335.77 | 0.0210% | 0.5740% |
| Battelle Memorial Institute | 1,542 | $2,857,524,446.97 | 0.0040% | 0.5140% |
| General Atomic Technologies Corporation | 763 | $2,751,841,125.72 | 0.0020% | 0.4950% |
| CACI International | 3,553 | $2,729,567,962.17 | 0.0090% | 0.4910% |
| California Institute of Technology | 2,775 | $2,727,873,918.22 | 0.0070% | 0.4900% |
| Jacobs Engineering Group | 3,262 | $2,626,449,064.26 | 0.0080% | 0.4720% |
| Consolidated Nuclear Security | 33 | $2,619,037,207.33 | 0.0000% | 0.4710% |
| Atlantic Diving Supply | 46,732 | $2,533,106,814.07 | 0.1130% | 0.4550% |
| Bell Textron / Boeing | 5,619 | $2,449,376,019.38 | 0.0140% | 0.4400% |
| Alliant Techsystems | 1,219 | $2,348,270,084.87 | 0.0030% | 0.4220% |
| TriWest Healthcare Alliance | 1,586,595 | $2,342,155,335.12 | 3.8270% | 0.4210% |
| AmerisourceBergen | 375,426 | $2,309,407,533.93 | 0.9050% | 0.4150% |
| KBR | 2,041 | $2,065,955,913.90 | 0.0050% | 0.3710% |
| Cerberus Capital Management | 1,116 | $2,047,497,247.51 | 0.0030% | 0.3680% |
| Analytic Services | 418 | $2,014,000,510.46 | 0.0010% | 0.3620% |
| Lawrence Livermore National Laboratory | 36 | $2,009,163,897.16 | 0.0000% | 0.3610% |
| Los Alamos National Security | 59 | $1,891,048,226.66 | 0.0000% | 0.3400% |
| Deloitte | 2,251 | $1,886,184,526.20 | 0.0050% | 0.3390% |
| United Launch Alliance | 99 | $1,852,050,029.87 | 0.0000% | 0.3330% |
| UT-Battelle | 66 | $1,764,064,340.79 | 0.0000% | 0.3170% |
| CSRA | 2106 | $1,716,922,498.08 | 0.0050% | 0.3080% |
| Accenture | 1,617 | $1,690,850,719.15 | 0.0040% | 0.3040% |
| Textron | 6,034 | $1,675,699,376.39 | 0.0150% | 0.3010% |
| Oshkosh Corporation | 13,227 | $1,614,038,945.61 | 0.0320% | 0.2900% |
| Mitre Corporation | 1,144 | $1,596,726,682.83 | 0.0030% | 0.2870% |
| Merck & Co | 114 | $1,583,695,405.09 | 0.0000% | 0.2850% |
| Sierra Nevada Corporation | 817 | $1,578,628,198.07 | 0.0020% | 0.2840% |
| UnitedHealth Group | 390 | $1,515,315,171.43 | 0.0010% | 0.2720% |
| Chemonics International | 257 | $1,512,957,703.07 | 0.0010% | 0.2720% |
| Austal | 292 | $1,508,462,409.41 | 0.0010% | 0.2710% |
| Enterprise Services | 16,626 | $1,467,819,060.73 | 0.0400% | 0.2640% |
| Leonardo | 2,682 | $1,384,998,258.53 | 0.0060% | 0.2490% |
| BL Harbert Holdings | 137 | $1,372,916,832.34 | 0.0000% | 0.2470% |
| California | 1,798 | $1,341,174,013.61 | 0.0040% | 0.2410% |
| PAE Holding Corporation | 672 | $1,278,275,625.93 | 0.0020% | 0.2300% |
| Johns Hopkins University | 2,521 | $1,268,359,755.02 | 0.0060% | 0.2280% |
| IBM | 1,401 | $1,209,810,857.14 | 0.0030% | 0.2170% |
| BP | 1,421 | $1,136,852,723.59 | 0.0030% | 0.2040% |
| Savannah River National Laboratory | 81 | $1,119,826,899.87 | 0.0000% | 0.2010% |
| Pfizer | 448 | $1,092,615,282.58 | 0.0010% | 0.1960% |
| Massachusetts Institute of Technology | 597 | $1,067,566,128.01 | 0.0010% | 0.1920% |
| Rockwell Collins | 3,006 | $1,035,964,115.86 | 0.0070% | 0.1860% |
| The Aerospace Corporation | 471 | $1,034,003,855.20 | 0.0010% | 0.1860% |
| SpaceX | 122 | $1,014,446,994.59 | 0.0000% | 0.1820% |
| Arctic Slope Regional Corporation | 2,415 | $1,010,003,226.10 | 0.0060% | 0.1820% |
| GlaxoSmithKline | 289 | $989,885,641.02 | 0.0010% | 0.1780% |
| FedEx | 12,293,886 | $971,090,768.70 | 29.6520% | 0.1750% |
| Vectrus | 298 | $962,460,460.66 | 0.0010% | 0.1730% |
| Parsons Corporation | 1,064 | $943,213,974.61 | 0.0030% | 0.1700% |
| Royal Dutch Shell | 968 | $937,379,110.11 | 0.0020% | 0.1680% |
| Martin Collier Phillips Corporation | 1,049 | $898,603,424.60 | 0.0030% | 0.1610% |
| ManTech International | 1,448 | $858,160,144.81 | 0.0030% | 0.1540% |
| Engility | 3,837 | $832,215,876.60 | 0.0090% | 0.1500% |
| Denali Holding | 3,178 | $815,969,049.92 | 0.0080% | 0.1470% |
| Louis Berger Group | 447 | $798,807,889.33 | 0.0010% | 0.1440% |
| AT&T | 13,295 | $788,466,034.80 | 0.0320% | 0.1420% |
| Great Lakes Dredge and Dock Company | 92 | $764,966,702.04 | 0.0000% | 0.1370% |
| Carahsoft | 3,314 | $758,910,489.31 | 0.0080% | 0.1360% |
| Rolls-Royce Holdings | 819 | $746,364,093.77 | 0.0020% | 0.1340% |
| Mission Support & Test Services | 28 | $701,229,986.92 | 0.0000% | 0.1260% |
| Patriot Team | 1,010 | $696,468,231.46 | 0.0020% | 0.1250% |
| CDW | 3,486 | $685,021,197.07 | 0.0080% | 0.1230% |
| Cardinal Health | 334,038 | $684,965,596.68 | 0.8060% | 0.1230% |
| CGI | 656 | $680,300,079.48 | 0.0020% | 0.1220% |
| Express Scripts Holding | 229 | $668,213,565.65 | 0.0010% | 0.1200% |
| Hensel Phelps Construction | 368 | $667,494,808.44 | 0.0010% | 0.1200% |
| ANHAM FZCO | 25,502 | $662,500,139.28 | 0.0620% | 0.1190% |
| Triad National Security | 4 | $648,967,944.53 | 0.0000% | 0.1170% |
| Serco | 1,136 | $644,617,652.86 | 0.0030% | 0.1160% |
| Insight Enterprises | 1,892 | $643,186,554.19 | 0.0050% | 0.1160% |
| Tetra Tech | 1,981 | $642,541,613.01 | 0.0050% | 0.1150% |
| Perspecta | 3,686 | $630,734,088.07 | 0.0090% | 0.1130% |
| Environmental Chemical Corporation | 170 | $627,670,543.98 | 0.0000% | 0.1130% |
| Iron Bow Holdings | 3,108 | $619,682,917.20 | 0.0070% | 0.1110% |
| Leland Stanford Junior University | 287 | $613,516,267.99 | 0.0010% | 0.1100% |
| Sanofi | 102 | $610,021,981.52 | 0.0000% | 0.1100% |
| NANA Regional Corporation | 1,172 | $599,058,746 | 0.0030% | 0.1080% |
| Brookhaven Science Associates | 41 | $594,116,923.33 | 0.0000% | 0.1070% |
| MacAndrews & Forbes | 1,771 | $590,407,677.75 | 0.0040% | 0.1060% |
| M1 Support Services | 226 | $579,909,688.45 | 0.0010% | 0.1040% |

== 2015 ==
Top 100 contractors FY2015 by dollars obligated
| Rank | Global vendor name | Actions performed | Dollars obligated | % Total actions | % Total dollars |
|---|---|---|---|---|---|
| 1 | Lockheed Martin | 121,387 | $36,259,911,070.83 | 0.6866% | 8.2999% |
| 2 | Boeing | 13,201 | $16,646,781,379.52 | 0.0747% | 3.8104% |
| 3 | General Dynamics | 21,945 | $13,632,984,913.57 | 0.1241% | 3.1206% |
| 4 | Raytheon Company | 10,554 | $13,114,246,704.69 | 0.0597% | 3.0018% |
| 5 | Northrop Grumman | 11,628 | $10,637,246,770.72 | 0.0658% | 2.4349% |
| 6 | McKesson Corporation | 106,371 | $8,358,491,280.54 | 0.6017% | 1.9133% |
| 7 | United Technologies | 25,400 | $6,792,039,706.41 | 0.1437% | 1.5547% |
| 8 | L-3 Communications | 8,493 | $5,450,824,009.65 | 0.0480% | 1.2477% |
| 9 | Bechtel | 201 | $4,645,069,049.63 | 0.0011% | 1.0633% |
| 10 | BAE Systems | 10,541 | $4,436,736,025.43 | 0.0596% | 1.0156% |
| 11 | Huntington Ingalls Industries | 2,815 | $3,658,243,433.80 | 0.0159% | 0.8374% |
| 12 | Humana | 359 | $3,606,978,123.20 | 0.0020% | 0.8256% |
| 13 | Science Applications International Corporation | 65,985 | $3,379,536,958.40 | 0.3736% | 0.7721% |
| 14 | Booz Allen Hamilton | 7,113 | $3,297,743,554.14 | 0.0402% | 0.7549% |
| 15 | Health Net | 238,665 | $3,020,424,385.16 | 1.3500% | 0.6914% |
| 16 | Computer Sciences Corporation | 3,993 | $2,756,927,050.45 | 0.0226% | 0.6311% |
| 17 | UnitedHealth Group | 47,752 | $2,717,025,525.59 | 0.2701% | 0.6219% |
| 18 | Aecom | 5,755 | $2,642,891,178.55 | 0.0336% | 0.6035% |
| 19 | Leidos | 5,416 | $2,616,770,962.11 | 0.0306% | 0.5990% |
| 20 | Harris Corporation | 3,619 | $2,408,484,467.32 | 0.0205% | 0.5513% |
| 21 | General Atomics | 794 | $2,367,308,868.69 | 0.0045% | 0.5419% |
| 22 | Hewlett-Packard | 19,814 | $2,339,463,638.01 | 0.1121% | 0.5355% |
| 23 | Battelle Memorial Institute | 1,920 | $2,160,120,731.76 | 0.0109% | 0.4945% |
| 24 | United Launch Alliance | 127 | $2,101,574,375.78 | 0.0007% | 0.4811% |
| 25 | Los Alamos National Security | 43 | $2,101,199,645.51 | 0.0002% | 0.4810% |
| 26 | Caci International | 3,432 | $2,060,262,978.75 | 0.0194% | 0.4716% |
| 27 | Bell Boeing Joint Project Office | 2,570 | $2,043,291,313.12 | 0.0145% | 0.4677% |
| 28 | AmerisourceBergen | 207,887 | $1,905,142,847.42 | 1.1759% | 0.4361% |
| 29 | California Institute of Technology | 2,094 | $1,865,908,370.62 | 0.0118% | 0.4271% |
| 30 | Honeywell | 6,941 | $1,779,793,073.48 | 0.0393% | 0.4074% |
| 31 | General Electric | 7,168 | $1,694,742,834.63 | 0.0406% | 0.3879% |
| 32 | Cerberus Capital Management | 1,147 | $1,661,418,631.90 | 0.0065% | 0.3803% |
| 33 | Consolidated Nuclear Security | 28 | $1,649,049,334.46 | 0.0002% | 0.3775% |
| 34 | Alliant Techsystems | 2,340 | $1,639,683,465.61 | 0.0132% | 0.3753% |
| 35 | Textron | 4,568 | $1,601,995,468.59 | 0.0258% | 0.3667% |
| 36 | Lawrence Livermore National Security | 75 | $1,479,337,728.49 | 0.0004% | 0.3386% |
| 37 | Jacobs Engineering Group | 3,447 | $1,478,726,652.43 | 0.0195% | 0.3385% |
| 38 | Merck & Co | 169 | $1,429,525,856.36 | 0.0010% | 0.3272% |
| 39 | Oshkosh Corporation | 7,503 | $1,425,719,452.89 | 0.0424% | 0.3264% |
| 40 | URS Corporation | 1,053 | $1,419,404,544.21 | 0.0060% | 0.3249% |
| 41 | Accenture | 1,235 | $1,405,912,537.52 | 0.0070% | 0.3218% |
| 42 | UT-Battelle | 54 | $1,382,350,891.11 | 0.0003% | 0.3164% |
| 43 | Mitre Corporation | 923 | $1,375,216,972.36 | 0.0052% | 0.3148% |
| 44 | Geo Group | 743 | $1,305,212,285.82 | 0.0046% | 0.2960% |
| 45 | Deloitte | 2,135 | $1,271,569,331.97 | 0.0121% | 0.2911% |
| 46 | Cardinal Health | 345,938 | $1,237,765,959.70 | 1.9568% | 0.2833% |
| 47 | IBM | 1,766 | $1,146,316,171.13 | 0.0100% | 0.2624% |
| 48 | Hensel Phelps Construction | 959 | $1,136,826,512.50 | 0.0058% | 0.2588% |
| 49 | Atlantic Diving Supply | 21,505 | $1,127,681,555.03 | 0.1216% | 0.2581% |
| 50 | CDW | 8,561 | $1,126,071,331.58 | 0.0506% | 0.2560% |
| 51 | Partnership For Supply Chain Management | 8 | $1,116,394,260.00 | 0.0000% | 0.2541% |
| 52 | Fluor Corporation | 620 | $1,104,860,125.36 | 0.0035% | 0.2529% |
| 53 | Sterling Parent | 2,016 | $1,076,045,234.02 | 0.0114% | 0.2463% |
| 54 | CH2M Hill | 1,810 | $1,058,458,310.44 | 0.0102% | 0.2423% |
| 55 | State Of California | 2,058 | $1,043,133,029.25 | 0.0116% | 0.2388% |
| 56 | Johns Hopkins University | 2,306 | $1,042,573,951.79 | 0.0130% | 0.2386% |
| 57 | Pae Holding Corporation | 722 | $1,038,319,541.72 | 0.0041% | 0.2377% |
| 58 | Patriot Team | 1,202 | $1,023,751,398.29 | 0.0072% | 0.2325% |
| 59 | European Aeronautic Defence And Space Company | 3,061 | $1,022,394,435.83 | 0.0185% | 0.2326% |
| 60 | Massachusetts Institute Of Technology | 418 | $1,008,987,437.69 | 0.0024% | 0.2310% |
| 61 | Chugach Alaska Corporation | 3,975 | $1,002,301,572.73 | 0.0238% | 0.2278% |
| 62 | Sierra Nevada Corporation | 828 | $991,348,427.35 | 0.0047% | 0.2269% |
| 63 | CoreCivic | 276 | $955,440,686.36 | 0.0017% | 0.2171% |
| 64 | Vectrus Systems Corporation | 517 | $939,981,606.37 | 0.0029% | 0.2152% |
| 65 | MacAndrews & Forbes | 1,253 | $918,230,264.44 | 0.0071% | 0.2102% |
| 66 | Pfizer | 280 | $915,457,674.74 | 0.0016% | 0.2096% |
| 67 | The Aerospace Corporation | 429 | $891,293,226.35 | 0.0024% | 0.2040% |
| 68 | Royal Dutch Shell | 777 | $889,306,927.73 | 0.0044% | 0.2036% |
| 69 | Savannah River National Laboratory | 72 | $888,787,570.74 | 0.0004% | 0.2034% |
| 70 | Bahrain Petroleum Company | 103 | $864,975,051.99 | 0.0006% | 0.1980% |
| 71 | Austal | 127 | $845,997,862.19 | 0.0007% | 0.1937% |
| 72 | Mantech International | 2,082 | $845,737,909.23 | 0.0118% | 0.1936% |
| 73 | Martin Collier Phillips Corporation | 7 | $842,970,468.00 | 0.0000% | 0.1930% |
| 74 | Arctic Slope Regional Corporation | 1,558 | $831,366,667.43 | 0.0088% | 0.1903% |
| 75 | Exelis | 2,068 | $829,184,993.14 | 0.0117% | 0.1898% |
| 76 | Rockwell Collins | 2,413 | $821,017,550.48 | 0.0137% | 0.1879% |
| 77 | Coins 'N Things | 223 | $797,898,825.81 | 0.0013% | 0.1826% |
| 78 | CGI | 1,172 | $775,107,940.48 | 0.0066% | 0.1774% |
| 79 | ExxonMobil | 278 | $770,793,543.46 | 0.0016% | 0.1764% |
| 80 | Denali Holding | 5,820 | $757,055,487.35 | 0.0329% | 0.1733% |
| 81 | Alion Science and Technology | 1,284 | $743,165,970.67 | 0.0073% | 0.1701% |
| 82 | Johns Hopkins Health Sys Corp | 33 | $726,110,658.12 | 0.0002% | 0.1647% |
| 83 | SpaceX | 46 | $672,805,700.06 | 0.0003% | 0.1540% |
| 84 | FedEx | 6,159,100 | $660,967,648.51 | 34.8395% | 0.1513% |
| 85 | Valero Energy | 409 | $645,962,647.93 | 0.0023% | 0.1479% |
| 86 | Wyle Laboratories | 1,309 | $642,109,898.40 | 0.0074% | 0.1470% |
| 87 | AT&T | 10,184 | $629,937,452.22 | 0.0576% | 0.1442% |
| 88 | Sanofi | 230 | $625,879,250.36 | 0.0013% | 0.1433% |
| 89 | GlaxoSmithKline | 183 | $617,114,539.15 | 0.0010% | 0.1413% |
| 90 | Serco | 1,193 | $575,085,983.68 | 0.0068% | 0.1316% |
| 91 | Navistar International | 1,398 | $575,070,751.35 | 0.0079% | 0.1316% |
| 92 | Berkshire Hathaway | 1,937 | $571,691,663.24 | 0.0110% | 0.1309% |
| 93 | Rolls-Royce North America | 873 | $550,725,221.56 | 0.0049% | 0.1261% |
| 94 | Express Scripts | 196 | $543,588,235.51 | 0.0011% | 0.1244% |
| 95 | BL Harbert International | 113 | $537,767,715.18 | 0.0006% | 0.1231% |
| 96 | Insight Enterprises | 1,835 | $534,665,924.24 | 0.0104% | 0.1224% |
| 97 | National Security Technologies | 31 | $524,715,956.10 | 0.0002% | 0.1201% |
| 98 | Caddell Construction Co | 141 | $490,729,304.41 | 0.0009% | 0.1105% |
| 99 | Chemonics | 234 | $488,918,571.20 | 0.0015% | 0.1101% |
| 100 | Mythics | 905 | $479,849,039.65 | 0.0058% | 0.1080% |

== Fiscal years 2008, 2009 and 2010 ==
Top 100 Contractors
| 2010 | | | | 2009 | | | | 2008 | | | |
| Rank | Company | Industry | Total | Rank | Company | Industry | Total | Rank | Company | Industry | Total |
|---|---|---|---|---|---|---|---|---|---|---|---|
| 1 | Lockheed Martin (NYSE: LMT) | Aerospace and Defense | $35,828,421,340.83 | 1 | Lockheed Martin (NYSE: LMT) | Aerospace and Defense | $38,512,401,433.23 | 1 | Lockheed Martin Corporation (NYSE: LMT) | Aerospace and Defense | $34,955,972,832.62 |
| 2 | Boeing (NYSE: BA) | Aerospace and Defense | $19,486,294,255.83 | 2 | Boeing (NYSE: BA) | Aerospace and Defense | $21,956,065,368.89 | 2 | Boeing (NYSE: BA) | Aerospace and Defense | $23,056,115,114.57 |
| 3 | Northrop Grumman (NYSE: NOC) | Aerospace and Defense | $16,797,921,451.22 | 3 | Northrop Grumman (NYSE: NOC) | Aerospace and Defense | $19,654,882,647.82 | 3 | Northrop Grumman (NYSE: NOC) | Aerospace and Defense | $20,911,547,618.33 |
| 4 | General Dynamics (NYSE: GD) | Defense | $15,249,055,811.75 | 4 | General Dynamics (NYSE: GD) | Defense | $16,432,366,120.40 | 4 | General Dynamics (NYSE: GD) | Defense | $15,498,861,106.20 |
| 5 | Raytheon Company (NYSE: RTN) | Aerospace and Defense | $15,245,234,506.52 | 5 | Raytheon Company (NYSE: RTN) | Aerospace and Defense | $16,106,903,431.28 | 5 | BAE Systems (LSE: BA.) | Aerospace and Defense | $15,234,852,409.75 |
| 6 | United Technologies (NYSE: UTX) | Conglomerate | $7,721,459,648.98 | 6 | United Technologies (NYSE: UTX) | Conglomerate | $7,538,417,441.35 | 6 | Raytheon Company (NYSE: RTN) | Aerospace and Defense | $14,701,172,323.31 |
| 7 | L-3 Communications (NYSE: LLL) | Communications and Defense | $7,445,106,575.43 | 7 | L-3 Communications (NYSE: LLL) | Communications and Defense | $7,538,417,441.35 | 7 | Emerson Construction Company | Construction | $13,951,282,017.40 |
| 8 | Oshkosh Corporation (NYSE: OSK) | Trucks and Vehicles | $7,243,489,906.25 | 8 | BAE Systems (LSE: BA.) | Aerospace and Defense | $7,538,417,441.35 | 8 | United Technologies (NYSE: UTX) | Conglomerate | $8,898,279,724.45 |
| 9 | SAIC (NYSE: SAIC) | Technology and Defense | $6,796,280,361.66 | 9 | SAIC (NYSE: SAIC) | Technology and Defense | $7,469,492,207.53 | 9 | L-3 Communications (NYSE: LLL) | Communications and Defense | $6,545,966,092.28 |
| 10 | BAE Systems (LSE: BA.) | Aerospace and Defense | $6,561,185,112.84 | 10 | Oshkosh Corporation (NYSE: OSK) | Trucks and Vehicles | $7,030,720,447.92 | 10 | KBR (NYSE: KBR) | Engineering, Construction and Private Military Company | $5,995,025,350.74 |
| 11 | Cerberus Capital Management | Private equity | $4,768,901,697.89 | 11 | McKesson (NYSE: MCK) | Healthcare | $6,566,776,579.50 | 11 | SAIC (NYSE: SAIC) | Technology and Defense | $5,932,121,220.23 |
| 12 | McKesson (NYSE: MCK) | Healthcare | $4,601,060,051.58 | 12 | KBR (NYSE: KBR) | Engineering, Construction and Private Military Company | $6,396,926,524.33 | 12 | Navistar Defense | Trucks and Vehicles | $4,727,948,333.49 |
| 13 | Computer Sciences Corporation (NYSE: CSC) | IT Services and IT Consulting | $4,372,553,085.04 | 13 | Bechtel | Engineering and Construction | $5,253,901,781.68 | 13 | MacAndrews & Forbes | Private equity | $4,712,823,714.60 |
| 14 | URS Corporation (NYSE: URS) | Engineering | $3,947,003,912.81 | 14 | Computer Sciences Corporation (NYSE: CSC) | IT Services and IT Consulting | $4,638,238,836.90 | 14 | McKesson (NYSE: MCK) | Healthcare | $4,630,016,458.67 |
| 15 | Bechtel | Engineering and Construction | $3,939,025,644.12 | 15 | General Electric (NYSE: GE) | Conglomerate | $4,288,347,658.39 | 15 | Computer Sciences Corporation (NYSE: CSC) | IT Services and IT Consulting | $4,382,495,830.41 |
| 16 | Booz Allen Hamilton (NYSE: BAH) | Consulting | $3,748,607,534.52 | 16 | Booz Allen Hamilton (NYSE: BAH) | Consulting | $4,154,871,707.63 | 16 | ITT Corporation (NYSE: ITT) | Conglomerate | $4,340,195,851.91 |
| 17 | KBR (NYSE: KBR) | Engineering, Construction and Private Military Company | $3,625,557,555.82 | 17 | Humana (NYSE: HUM) | Health insurance | $3,801,724,603.63 | 17 | Bechtel | Engineering and Construction | $4,211,344,745.83 |
| 18 | Harris Corporation (NYSE: HRS) | Communications | $3,301,564,466.11 | 18 | CH2M Hill | Engineering and Construction | $3,477,544,402.56 | 18 | General Electric (NYSE: GE) | Conglomerate | $3,834,032,403.41 |
| 19 | Humana (NYSE: HUM) | Health insurance | $3,248,780,847.62 | 19 | ITT Corporation (NYSE: ITT) | Conglomerate | $3,437,969,127.66 | 19 | URS Corporation (NYSE: URS) | Engineering | $3,490,848,518.80 |
| 20 | Health Net (NYSE: HNT) | Health insurance | $3,224,143,073.24 | 20 | Veritas Capital Management II | Private equity | $3,371,700,097.35 | 20 | Humana (NYSE: HUM) | Health insurance | $2,959,882,153.60 |
| 21 | General Electric (NYSE: GE) | Conglomerate | $3,134,833,212.85 | 21 | Health Net (NYSE: HNT) | Health insurance | $3,050,526,659.86 | 21 | Textron (NYSE: TXT) | Conglomerate | $2,824,829,825.72 |
| 22 | ITT Corporation (NYSE: ITT) | Conglomerate | $2,814,320,312.00 | 22 | Honeywell (NYSE: HON) | Conglomerate | $2,938,415,700.74 | 22 | Bell Boeing Joint Project Office | Aerospace and Defense | $2,801,354,948.05 |
| 23 | Bell Boeing Joint Project Office | Aerospace and Defense | $2,752,694,557.21 | 23 | MacAndrews & Forbes | Private equity | $2,842,793,177.61 | 23 | Booz Allen Hamilton (NYSE: BAH) | Consulting | $2,794,473,592.20 |
| 24 | TriWest Healthcare Alliance | Health benefits | $2,721,404,316.04 | 24 | TriWest Healthcare Alliance | Health benefits | $2,756,985,745.67 | 24 | Health Net (NYSE: HNT) | Health insurance | $2,632,042,610.19 |
| 25 | Government of Canada | | $2,678,746,839.33 | 25 | Bell Boeing Joint Project Office | Aerospace and Defense | $2,728,652,735.67 | 25 | Hewlett-Packard (NYSE: HPQ) | Computer Systems and IT Services | $2,625,241,243.98 |
| 26 | CACI (NYSE: CACI) | IT Services | $2,634,468,461.90 | 26 | Los Alamos National Security | Technology | $2,672,212,524.42 | 26 | Harris Corporation (NYSE: HRS) | Communications | $2,367,592,807.59 |
| 27 | Honeywell (NYSE: HON) | Conglomerate | $2,432,045,145.40 | 27 | Alliant Techsystems (NYSE: ATK) | Aerospace and Defense | $2,620,340,065.85 | 27 | TriWest Healthcare Alliance | Health benefits | $2,366,975,634.00 |
| 28 | Battelle Memorial Institute | Technology | $2,329,849,622.35 | 28 | Battelle Memorial Institute | Technology | $2,482,563,090.03 | 28 | DynCorp | Private Military Company | $2,316,452,087.10 |
| 29 | Textron (NYSE: TXT) | Conglomerate | $2,216,419,550.86 | 29 | Savannah River National Laboratory | Energy | $2,482,063,479.69 | 29 | Battelle Memorial Institute | Technology | $2,267,297,950.94 |
| 30 | Los Alamos National Security | Technology | $2,204,845,560.14 | 30 | URS Corporation (NYSE: URS) | Engineering | $2,319,114,845.35 | 30 | Los Alamos National Security | Technology | $2,180,842,942.05 |
| 31 | Alliant Techsystems (NYSE: ATK) | Aerospace and Defense | $2,197,273,707.88 | 31 | Electronic Data Systems Corporation | IT Services | $2,234,182,854.85 | 31 | Honeywell (NYSE: HON) | Conglomerate | $2,166,700,213.06 |
| 32 | Supreme Group Holding SARL | Food Supplies | $2,122,754,640.03 | 32 | Harris Corporation (NYSE: HRS) | Communications | $2,109,236,009.99 | 32 | The Public Warehousing Company KSC (KRX: AGLTY) | Logistics | $2,141,563,895.01 |
| 33 | Jacobs Engineering Group (NYSE: JEC) | Engineering and Construction | $2,059,889,624.46 | 33 | Agility (KRX: AGLTY) | Logistics | $2,101,111,497.95 | 33 | Lawrence Livermore National Security | Research and Technology | $2,097,721,853.59 |
| 34 | Fluor Corporation (NYSE: FLR) | Engineering and Construction | $1,905,633,027.45 | 34 | Royal Dutch Shell (LSE: RDSA)(LSE: RDSB) | Oil and Gas | $2,022,727,548.81 | 34 | Finmeccanica (BIT: FNC) | Aerospace, Defense and Energy | $2,025,631,042.98 |
| 35 | Abu Dhabi National Oil Company | Oil | $1,895,207,544.00 | 35 | CACI (NYSE: CACI) | IT Services | $2,016,836,386.77 | 35 | Alliant Techsystems (NYSE: ATK) | Aerospace and Defense | $1,931,415,989.63 |
| 36 | Navistar International (NYSE: NAV) | Trucks and Vehicles | $1,888,875,971.66 | 36 | DRS Technologies | Defense | $1,906,877,996.67 | 36 | Oshkosh Corporation (NYSE: OSK) | Trucks and Vehicles | $1,878,291,038.62 |
| 37 | General Atomics | Defense and Energy | $1,862,745,579.30 | 37 | IBM (NYSE: IBM) | Computer Systems and IT Services | $1,895,669,580.24 | 37 | California Institute of Technology | Research and Technology | $1,795,703,976.84 |
| 38 | United Space Alliance | Aerospace | $1,807,836,968.19 | 38 | Massachusetts Institute of Technology | Research and Technology | $1,889,303,510.92 | 38 | Federal Express Charter Program Team Arrangement (NYSE: FDX) | Courier | $1,785,873,190.83 |
| 39 | Hewlett-Packard (NYSE: HPQ) | Computer Systems and IT Services | $1,767,768,233.93 | 39 | Bahrain Petroleum Company | Oil | $1,814,934,913.27 | 39 | United Space Alliance | Aerospace | $1,748,395,905.80 |
| 40 | Creative Associates International | International Development | $1,767,520,077.44 | 40 | California Institute of Technology | Research and Technology | $1,755,686,974.55 | 40 | Jacobs Engineering Group (NYSE: JEC) | Engineering and Construction | $1,727,652,364.16 |
| 41 | Dell (Nasdaq: Dell) | Computer Systems and IT Services | $1,714,725,489.36 | 41 | BP (LSE: BP) | Oil and Gas | $1,754,532,741.64 | 41 | BP (LSE: BP) | Oil and Gas | $1,720,899,473.95 |
| 42 | ManTech International | IT Services | $1,703,119,783.03 | 42 | Jacobs Engineering Group (NYSE: JEC) | Engineering and Construction | $1,742,189,110.70 | 42 | IBM (NYSE: IBM) | Computer Systems and IT Services | $1,620,563,760.31 |
| 43 | California Institute of Technology | Research and Technology | $1,663,548,743.03 | 43 | UT-Battelle | Research and Energy | $1,692,140,156.64 | 43 | Royal Dutch Shell (LSE: RDSA)(LSE: RDSB) | Oil and Gas | $1,594,316,500.73 |
| 44 | IBM (NYSE: IBM) | Computer Systems and IT Services | $1,653,157,521.11 | 44 | Hensel Phelps Construction | Construction | $1,685,933,488.33 | 44 | Fluor Corporation (NYSE: FLR) | Engineering and Construction | $1,566,904,105.68 |
| 45 | Evergreen International Airlines | Logistics | $1,612,054,323.80 | 45 | Novartis (SIX: NOVN) | Pharmaceuticals | $1,672,992,683.21 | 45 | The Shaw Group (NYSE: SHAW) | Engineering and Construction | $1,565,537,990.31 |
| 46 | UT-Battelle | Research and Energy | $1,552,706,037.82 | 46 | United Space Alliance | Aerospace | $1,577,647,711.89 | 46 | CACI (NYSE: CACI) | IT Services | $1,507,017,809.63 |
| 47 | Lawrence Livermore National Security | Research and Technology | $1,532,081,365.89 | 47 | Cerberus Capital Management | Private equity | $1,561,670,857.04 | 47 | Evergreen International Airlines | Logistics | $1,445,897,765.35 |
| 48 | Apptis Holdings (NYSE: URS) | Engineering | $1,519,667,910.49 | 48 | Washington Group International | Engineering and Construction | $1,523,028,716.01 | 48 | Hensel Phelps Construction | Construction | $1,414,049,214.01 |
| 49 | Finmeccanica (BIT: FNC) | Aerospace, Defense and Energy | $1,500,809,378.99 | 49 | Federal Express Charter Program Team Arrangement (NYSE: FDX) | Courier | $1,518,819,344.97 | 49 | CH2M Hill | Engineering and Construction | $1,379,239,343.37 |
| 50 | FedEx (NYSE: FDX) | Courier | $1,447,106,532.26 | 50 | Lawrence Livermore National Security | Research and Technology | $1,505,850,950.42 | 50 | Force Protection (Nasdaq: FRPT) | Defense and Vehicles | $1,360,427,188.60 |
| 51 | Rockwell Collins (NYSE: COL) | Aerospace | $1,419,584,132.47 | 51 | The Shaw Group (NYSE: SHAW) | Engineering and Construction | $1,492,966,207.32 | 51 | AmerisourceBergen (NYSE: ABC) | Pharmaceuticals | $1,325,105,366.76 |
| 52 | Spectrum Group International | Precious metals | $1,404,897,327.13 | 52 | General Atomics | Defense and Energy | $1,432,571,139.97 | 52 | Rockwell Collins (NYSE: COL) | Aerospace | $1,240,738,202.63 |
| 53 | Merck & Co (NYSE: MRK) | Pharmaceuticals | $1,402,363,802.31 | 53 | Dell (Nasdaq: Dell) | Computer Systems and IT Services | $1,406,764,176.31 | 53 | UT-Battelle | Research and Energy | $1,202,225,092.29 |
| 54 | AmerisourceBergen (NYSE: ABC) | Pharmaceuticals | $1,352,857,126.07 | 54 | Merck & Co (NYSE: MRK) | Pharmaceuticals | $1,389,651,320.91 | 54 | General Atomics | Defense and Energy | $1,142,082,245.99 |
| 55 | The Public Warehousing Company KSC (KRX: AGLTY) | Logistics | $1,302,596,360.51 | 55 | Sanofi-Aventis Euronext Paris: SAN | Pharmaceuticals | $1,367,190,046.36 | 55 | Merck & Co (NYSE: MRK) | Pharmaceuticals | $1,131,811,521.00 |
| 56 | CH2M Hill | Engineering and Construction | $1,283,188,935.99 | 56 | BearingPoint | Management consulting | $1,361,515,489.10 | 56 | Dell (Nasdaq: Dell) | Computer Systems and IT Services | $1,104,501,153.38 |
| 57 | Mitre Corporation | Research | $1,152,657,276.03 | 57 | Evergreen International Airlines | Logistics | $1,322,675,791.37 | 57 | Red Star Enterprises | Logistics and Aviation Fuel | $1,069,266,940.96 |
| 58 | Lockheed Missiles and Space Company (NYSE: LMT) | Aerospace and Defense | $1,136,761,929.60 | 58 | International Military and Government | Trucks and Vehicles | $1,317,741,892.34 | 58 | Mitre Corporation | Research | $1,065,425,164.22 |
| 59 | Atlantic Diving Supply | Logistics | $1,130,403,977.26 | 59 | BWX Technologies | Nuclear Power and Nuclear Weapons | $1,308,400,941.05 | 59 | SRA International (NYSE: SRX) | IT Services | $1,051,711,542.54 |
| 60 | The Shaw Group (NYSE: SHAW) | Engineering and Construction | $1,082,847,660.90 | 60 | AmerisourceBergen (NYSE: ABC) | Pharmaceuticals | $1,307,252,074.81 | 60 | Valero Energy (NYSE: VLO) | Oil | $1,043,869,550.58 |
| 61 | SRA International (NYSE: SRX) | IT Services | $1,081,861,297.51 | 61 | Clark Enterprises | Construction | $1,296,545,032.11 | 61 | VSE Corporation (Nasdaq: VSEC) | Engineering and Logistics | $1,039,172,615.94 |
| 62 | MacAndrews & Forbes | Private equity | $1,080,535,708.39 | 62 | Textron (NYSE: TXT) | Conglomerate | $1,282,747,803.52 | 62 | Cardinal Health (NYSE: CAH) | Healthcare | $1,037,057,234.35 |
| 63 | Sanofi-Aventis | Pharmaceuticals | $1,073,294,237.25 | 63 | Rockwell Collins (NYSE: COL) | Aerospace | $1,249,784,311.64 | 63 | Bahrain Petroleum Company | Oil | $1,017,695,559.95 |
| 64 | Royal Dutch Shell (LSE: RDSA)(LSE: RDSB) | Oil and Gas | $1,054,997,970.79 | 64 | Mitre Corporation | Research | $1,221,865,890.58 | 64 | Cerberus Capital Management II | Private equity | $993,815,549.73 |
| 65 | Pfizer (NYSE: PFE) | Pharmaceuticals | $1,050,962,428.72 | 65 | International Oil Trading Co | Logistics and Aviation Fuel | $1,178,743,763.29 | 65 | State of California | | $989,547,208.03 |
| 66 | State of California | | $1,036,635,924.11 | 66 | Fluor Corporation (NYSE: FLR) | Engineering and Construction | $1,056,803,614.56 | 66 | Accenture (NYSE: ACN) | Management consulting | $920,404,673.42 |
| 67 | Cardinal Health (NYSE: CAH) | Healthcare | $1,035,562,874.39 | 67 | Valero Energy (NYSE: VLO) | Oil | $1,049,289,818.27 | 67 | Abu Dhabi National Oil Company | Oil | $918,256,500.00 |
| 68 | BP (LSE: BP) | Oil and Gas | $1,033,361,493.19 | 68 | Hawker Beechcraft | Aerospace | $1,028,557,215.75 | 68 | Hawker Beechcraft | Aerospace | $874,794,712.56 |
| 69 | Kuwait Petroleum Corporation | Oil | $1,011,618,403.55 | 69 | GlaxoSmithKline (LSE: GSK) | Pharmaceuticals | $969,722,172.97 | 69 | ManTech International | IT Services | $853,711,844.97 |
| 70 | Hensel Phelps Construction | Construction | $1,006,122,672.59 | 70 | Gulf Intracoastal Constructors | Construction | $963,520,252.00 | 70 | Carlyle Partners IV | Private equity | $852,771,287.02 |
| 71 | Johns Hopkins University | Research | $963,056,456.22 | 71 | SRA International (NYSE: SRX) | IT Services | $959,813,110.52 | 71 | BWX Technologies | Nuclear Power and Nuclear Weapons | $834,192,631.13 |
| 72 | Court Square Capital Partners | Private equity | $938,740,551.15 | 72 | Rolls-Royce Group (LSE: RR.) | Aerospace and Defense | $956,840,034.34 | 72 | Qinetiq (LSE: QQ.) | Defense | $828,288,315.50 |
| 73 | Babcock & Wilcox Technical Services Y-12 (NYSE: BWC) | Nuclear Power and Nuclear Weapons | $901,703,737.63 | 73 | Accenture (NYSE: ACN) | Management consulting | $931,307,113.30 | 73 | Unisys (NYSE: UIS) | IT Services | $821,086,499.84 |
| 74 | Savannah River National Laboratory | Energy | $884,502,713.25 | 74 | Afinsa | Art and Antiques | $925,324,294.40 | 74 | The Aerospace Corporation | Aerospace | $806,585,744.73 |
| 75 | Massachusetts Institute of Technology | Research and Technology | $876,792,510.14 | 75 | Cardinal Health (NYSE: CAH) | Healthcare | $920,465,888.64 | 75 | ExxonMobil (NYSE: XOM) | Oil and Gas | $792,326,908.08 |
| 76 | BL Harbert International | Construction | $873,789,545.36 | 76 | Alliance for Sustainable Energy | Energy | $914,172,435.52 | 76 | Arctic Slope Regional Corporation | Alaska Native Corporation | $791,154,484.21 |
| 77 | Rolls-Royce Group (LSE: RR.) | Aerospace and Defense | $868,151,382.65 | 77 | Supreme Foodservice | Food Supplies | $912,510,126.47 | 77 | Government of Canada | | $784,813,738.43 |
| 78 | Deloitte | Accountancy and Consulting | $863,904,112.08 | 78 | Johns Hopkins University | Research | $893,838,673.87 | 78 | BearingPoint | Management consulting | $781,773,181.83 |
| 79 | Clark Enterprises | Construction | $862,480,601.35 | 79 | EDO Corporation | Defense | $889,426,683.89 | 79 | Afognak Native Corporation | Alaska Native Corporation | $749,557,576.49 |
| 80 | The Aerospace Corporation | Aerospace | $845,409,358.81 | 80 | ManTech International | IT Services | $844,177,835.70 | 80 | Tetra Tech (Nasdaq: TTEK) | Engineering and Construction | $748,292,508.86 |
| 81 | CGI Group (NYSE: GIB) | IT Services and Consulting | $841,453,900.28 | 81 | Brookhaven Science Associates | Research | $839,331,231.35 | 81 | Motor Oil (Hellas) Corinth Refineries (Athex: MOH) | Oil | $724,853,532.89 |
| 82 | Accenture (NYSE: ACN) | Management consulting | $835,279,268.50 | 82 | The Aerospace Corporation | Aerospace | $836,890,221.47 | 82 | NANA Regional Corporation | Alaska Native Corporation | $709,960,870.49 |
| 83 | Tetra Tech (Nasdaq: TTEK) | Engineering and Construction | $821,762,222.11 | 83 | Sierra Nevada Corporation | Aerospace | $792,006,704.65 | 83 | Massachusetts Institute of Technology | Research and Technology | $700,391,666.45 |
| 84 | NANA Regional Corporation | Alaska Native Corporation | $772,578,131.47 | 84 | VSE Corporation (Nasdaq: VSEC) | Engineering and Logistics | $787,563,519.65 | 84 | General Motors (NYSE: GM) | Automobiles | $695,287,579.72 |
| 85 | Caddell Construction Co | Construction | $771,392,564.40 | 85 | The Regents of the University of California | Higher Education and Research | $766,179,039.68 | 85 | Johns Hopkins University | Research | $676,644,753.25 |
| 86 | Unisys (NYSE: UIS) | IT Services | $761,736,911.88 | 86 | Chugach Alaska Corporation | Alaska Native Corporation | $765,196,736.26 | 86 | Interpublic Group of Companies (NYSE: IPG) | Advertising | $662,462,488.60 |
| 87 | Sierra Nevada Corporation | Aerospace | $756,336,058.54 | 87 | UChicago Argonne | Research | $764,049,422.78 | 87 | Sanofi-Aventis (Euronext Paris: SAN ) | Pharmaceuticals | $655,721,722.04 |
| 88 | VSE Corporation (Nasdaq: VSEC) | Engineering and Logistics | $713,710,543.80 | 88 | SK Energy (KRX:SK) | Energy and Chemicals | $760,801,383.08 | 88 | Supreme Foodservice | Food Supplies | $647,150,277.81 |
| 89 | United Parcel Service (NYSE: UPS) | Courier | $701,410,728.60 | 89 | Anthem Health of Indiana (NYSE: WLP) | Health insurance | $750,304,988.85 | 89 | AECOM (NYSE: ACM) | Engineering | $646,563,551.30 |
| 90 | Brookhaven National Laboratory | Research | $692,037,933.66 | 90 | Unisys Corporation (NYSE: UIS) | IT Services | $746,459,678.29 | 90 | Chugach Alaska Corporation | Alaska Native Corporation | $617,893,411.73 |
| 91 | Arctic Slope Regional Corporation | Alaska Native Corporation | $690,633,670.29 | 91 | Washington River Protection Solutions | Environmental remediation | $739,234,326.23 | 91 | Rolls-Royce Group (LSE: RR.) | Aerospace and Defense | $587,716,822.40 |
| 92 | Qinetiq (LSE: QQ.) | Defense | $689,036,864.49 | 92 | Afognak Native Corporation | Alaska Native Corporation | $715,715,816.25 | 92 | RO Defence Projects | Defense | $579,754,142.06 |
| 93 | Serco (LSE: SRP) | Government services | $681,528,513.00 | 93 | General Motors (NYSE: GM) | Automobiles | $707,035,778.28 | 93 | Afinsa | Art and Antiques | $573,328,671.03 |
| 94 | Mission Essential | Personnel services | $681,306,025.53 | 94 | Hochtief (FWB: HOT) | Construction | $696,296,688.94 | 94 | G4S (LSE: GFS) | Security | $564,724,730.63 |
| 95 | AT&T (NYSE: T) | Communications | $678,313,197.41 | 95 | Kongsberg Gruppen | Defense and | $683,372,049.34 | 95 | Caddell Construction Co | Construction | $552,376,900.49 |
| 96 | UChicago Argonne | Research | $674,142,436.56 | 96 | Wyeth-Ayerst International (NYSE: PFE) | Pharmaceuticals | $682,839,473.61 | 96 | Babcock & Wilcox Technical Services Pantex (NYSE: BWC) | Nuclear Power and Nuclear Weapons | $548,787,297.08 |
| 97 | Afognak Native Corporation | Alaska Native Corporation | $665,334,937.36 | 97 | Veritas Capital Fund II | Private equity | $677,611,257.07 | 97 | UChicago Argonne | Research | $533,789,340.06 |
| 98 | G4S (LSE: GFS) | Security | $664,823,559.57 | 98 | The Walsh Group | Construction | $656,375,864.08 | 98 | FLIR Systems (Nasdaq: FLIR) | Thermal Imaging | $527,680,128.53 |
| 99 | Combat Support Associates | Defense | $659,881,481.00 | 99 | Tetra Tech (Nasdaq: TTEK) | Engineering and Construction | $637,978,728.13 | 99 | Corrections Corporation of America (NYSE: CXW) | Prisons | $526,091,285.63 |
| 100 | AECOM (NYSE: ACM) | Engineering | $641,704,588.92 | 100 | Arctic Slope Regional Corporation | Alaska Native Corporation | $637,187,790.85 | 100 | Savannah River National Laboratory | Energy | $524,919,659.91 |

== See also ==
- Government procurement in the United States
- Government procurement
- Federal Acquisition Regulation
- Federal Procurement Data System
- Sustainable procurement
- Berry Amendment - requiring the Department of Defense to give preference in procurement to domestic goods and services
- Military–industrial complex
