= Atlantic Diving Supply =

US government contractors

- Industry: Logistics and federal contracting
- Founded: 1997
- Founders: Luke Hillier, Mike Hillier Sr.
- Headquarters: Virginia Beach, Virginia, U.S.
- Area served: Worldwide
- Website: https://www.adsinc.com/

Atlantic Diving Supply is a reseller of military equipment based in Virginia Beach, Virginia. In 2019, they were the 24th-largest federal contractor.

According to The Virginian-Pilot, "ADS packages related items into 'kits'—cold-weather gear for soldiers or flame-retardant gear for firefighters, for example—to be shipped together."

ADS and its leaders have paid tens of millions of dollars to settle allegations of fraud.

== History ==
Atlantic Diving Supply started in 1979 as Lynnhaven Dive Center, a small dive shop in Virginia Beach opened by Mike Hillier Sr. Due to its location, many early customers had ties to the military. In 1997, Mike's son Luke Hillier created an offshoot to seek federal contracts, particularly orders from the military diving community. In 2000, ADS won its first major contract from the Defense Logistics Agency (DLA). The post-9/11 military spending boom fueled its growth.

In 2010, ADS had $1.3 billion in sales with 4,000 customers (primarily from the Department of Defense and Department of Homeland Security) and 1,400 vendors. In 2010 they considered going public through an initial public offering (IPO) and filed paperwork to that effect with the Securities and Exchange Commission. They did not go through with the IPO.

In 2011, ADS sued non-profit Bancroft Global Development for breach of contract over an order for 18,000 military boots and other equipment. Bancroft countersued them for providing sub-standard equipment, especially cheap costume quality military boots from China, allegations substantiated by reporting. The equipment was intended for the transitional federal government of Somalia and was part of a US State Department contract which was awarded to DynCorp International and then subcontracted out.

By 2012, ADS was doing $1 billion yearly in government contracting and paid $9 million in executive compensation. Company head Jason Wallace received $2.2 million.

In 2015, ADS bought Theodore Wille International, an international military logistics company. In that same year, they won a five-year $72 million contract to deliver 1,249 Mk 153 Shoulder-Launched Multipurpose Assault Weapon (SMAW) systems to the US Marine Corps. These SMAW have several improvements from the original model, including the replacement of the 9mm spotting gun with laser and thermal sights.

By 2017, ADS had more than $2 billion in revenue.

In 2017, ADS agreed to pay $16 million to settle a case which centered on allegations that it had used smaller entities it controlled to fraudulently bid on federal contracts as small businesses. In 2019, Ron Villanueva was convicted for helping SEK Solutions, an ADS-controlled entity, improperly get contracts set aside for women and minority-owned small businesses.

In 2019, ADS was awarded a $49 million contract to supply Safariland holsters for the Army's new M17 and M18 service pistols.

ADS was one of two companies selected to supply the exercise equipment to the US Army needed to implement the Army Combat Fitness Test (ACFT).

They sold personal protective equipment and other supplies to the federal government during the COVID-19 pandemic. The multibillion-dollar company received millions of dollars in pandemic-related loans earmarked for small businesses.

In July 2020, former chief executive officer (CEO) Luke Hillier paid $20 million to settle a personal fraud case against him stemming from his tenure at ADS.

In March 2021, ADS was awarded a $100 million DLA contract to supply patient monitoring technology, training, and support and a $91 million DLA contract to support weapons programs. Senator Thom Tillis criticized the fact that the company continued to receive federal contracts after repeatedly defrauding the government.

In 2022, Ryan Angold replaced Jason Wallace as CEO and John Dunn became chief operating officer in addition to chief financial officer.

== See also ==
- Military engineering
- War on terror
- Chemonics
- Vectrus
- Engility
