= Stephen Ondra =

Stephen L. Ondra
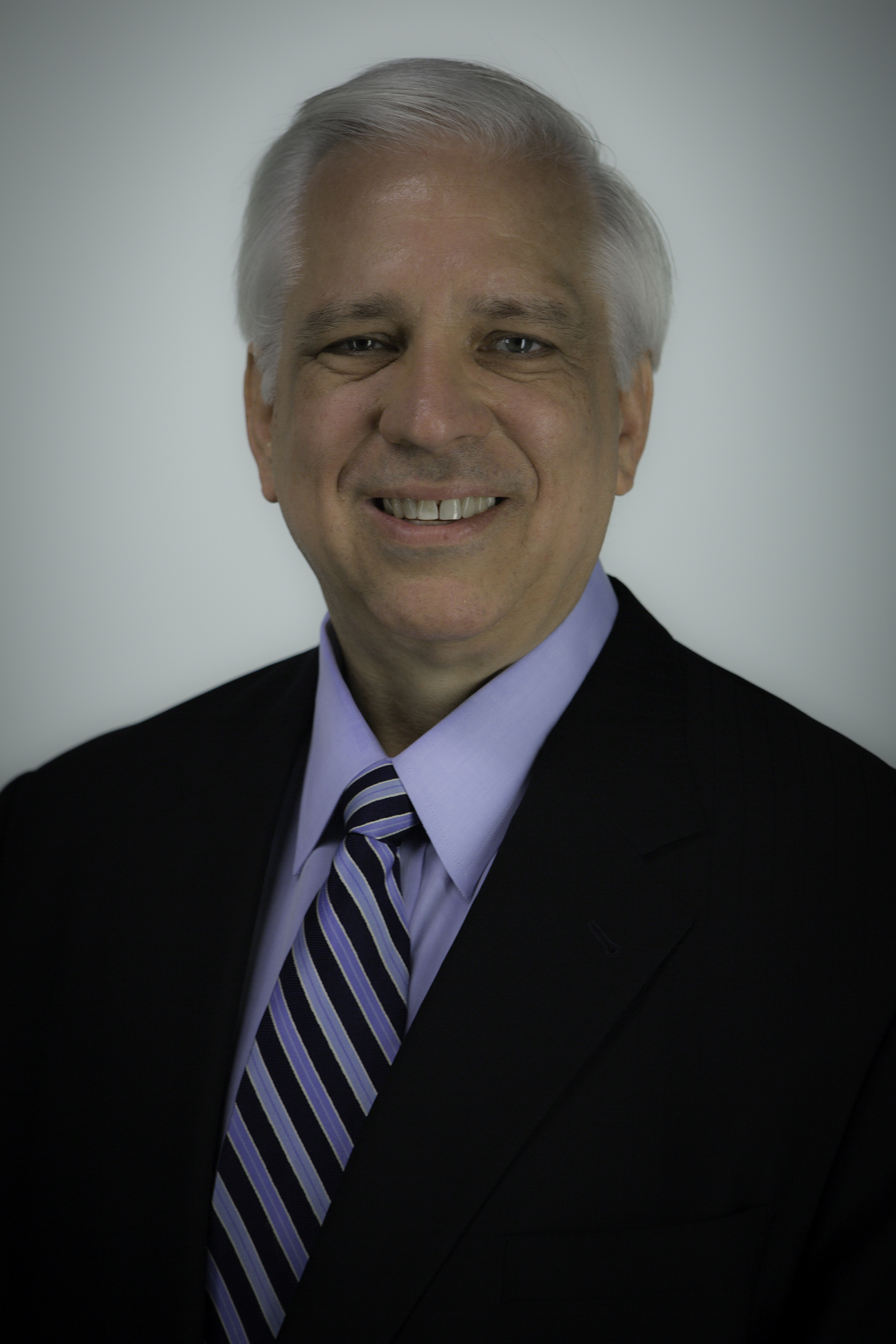

Vice President, Center for Transforming Health, Director, Health FFRDC for the MITRE Corporation
- Incumbent
- Assumed office July 2024

Personal details
- Born: Stephen L. Ondra; March 23, 1957
- Education: Illinois Wesleyan University; Rush Medical College

Stephen L. Ondra is vice president of MITRE's Center for Transforming Health and director of the CMS Alliance to Modernize Healthcare federally funded research and development center (Health FFRDC). Ondra leads collaboration with government, industry, and academia to drive innovation in healthcare, public health, and social services. Previously at MITRE, Ondra served as chief medical advisor for the Health FFRDC, advising all HHS organizations to advance private insurance markets, Medicare and Medicaid, value-based payments, and healthcare quality. Before coming to MITRE, Ondra was most recently CEO of Cygnus-AI Inc., a company specializing in artificial intelligence and clinical decision support tools for diagnostic radiology. He was also founder and chief executive officer of North Star Health Care Consulting, and served on the board of directors of Triple-S Management and electroCore. A neurosurgeon and neuroscientist, Ondra has also served in senior positions in the Federal government, having a role in health reform efforts and the implementation of the Affordable Care Act. He advises corporations, provider organizations and early-stage start-ups on the transition to value-based care and health IT strategy.

== Education ==
Ondra began his post-secondary education at the U.S. Military Academy, but he was injured in a training accident. Ondra graduated from Illinois Wesleyan University. Recovering from injuries, he re-entered military service in the Army and completed his doctorate at Rush Medical College. During his residency at Walter Reed Army Medical Center, he specialized in spine surgery and reconstruction in both neurosurgery and orthopedics.

== Military career ==
Ondra is a veteran of the Operations Desert Storm and Desert Shield, and he was awarded a Bronze Star Medal and the Army Commendation Medal for extraordinary service and heroism as a military doctor. Ondra served on the Veterans Affairs group in the Obama-Biden Presidential Transition Team; he provided advice to the Obama-Biden Campaign on Health Policy and Veteran's Policy.

== Early career ==
From 2013 to 2016, Ondra was the senior vice president and chief medical officer of Health Care Service Corporation (HCSC), the nation's fourth largest healthcare insurance company. At HCSC, he led medical management, pharmacy, medical policy, quality improvement, healthcare analytics, strategic clinical communications and performance measurement programs.

Prior to HCSC, Ondra was senior vice president and chief medical officer of Northwestern Memorial Hospital. He also served as the interim chair for the Department of Neurological Surgery at Northwestern University Feinberg School of Medicine. He continues to be an adjunct Professor of Neurological Surgery at Northwestern University Feinberg School of Medicine.

Prior to returning to Northwestern, Ondra was a member of President Barack Obama’s Administration. He was appointed as Senior Health Policy Advisor for the Secretary of Veterans Affairs on May 10, 2009. In 2010, he was assigned to the Executive Office of the President, where he served until February 2012. At the White House, Ondra served in the Office of Science and Technology Policy, as the health information technology co-chair of the National Science and Technology Council. At the White House, Ondra also served on the Implementation Deputies Group for the Patient Protection and Affordable Care Act.

Prior to his appointment to the Administration by President Obama, Ondra was a professor of neurological surgery at Northwestern University, and he chaired the Medical Device and Technology Committee at Northwestern Memorial Hospital. Ondra has also worked with the Department of Defense as the chairman of the Defense Spinal Cord Board and Spinal Column Injury Program, and the Defense Spine Blast Injury Program. In partnership with other faculty at Northwestern, he pioneered new surgical procedures and the use of available motion analysis technology to assess treatment of spinal surgery patients.

== Committees and board appointments ==
- The Guiding Committee of the Health Care Payment Learning Action Network
- Board of trustees, Louis W. Sullivan Institute for Healthcare Transformation
- America's Health Insurance Plans (AHIP) Core Quality Measurement Task Force
- Health Care Transformation Task Force
- Board of directors, TriWest Healthcare Alliance
- Adjunct Senior Fellow, Center for a New American Security
- Board of trustees, Illinois Wesleyan University
