= Y-12 National Security Complex =

US Department of Energy facility in Oak Ridge, Tennessee, US

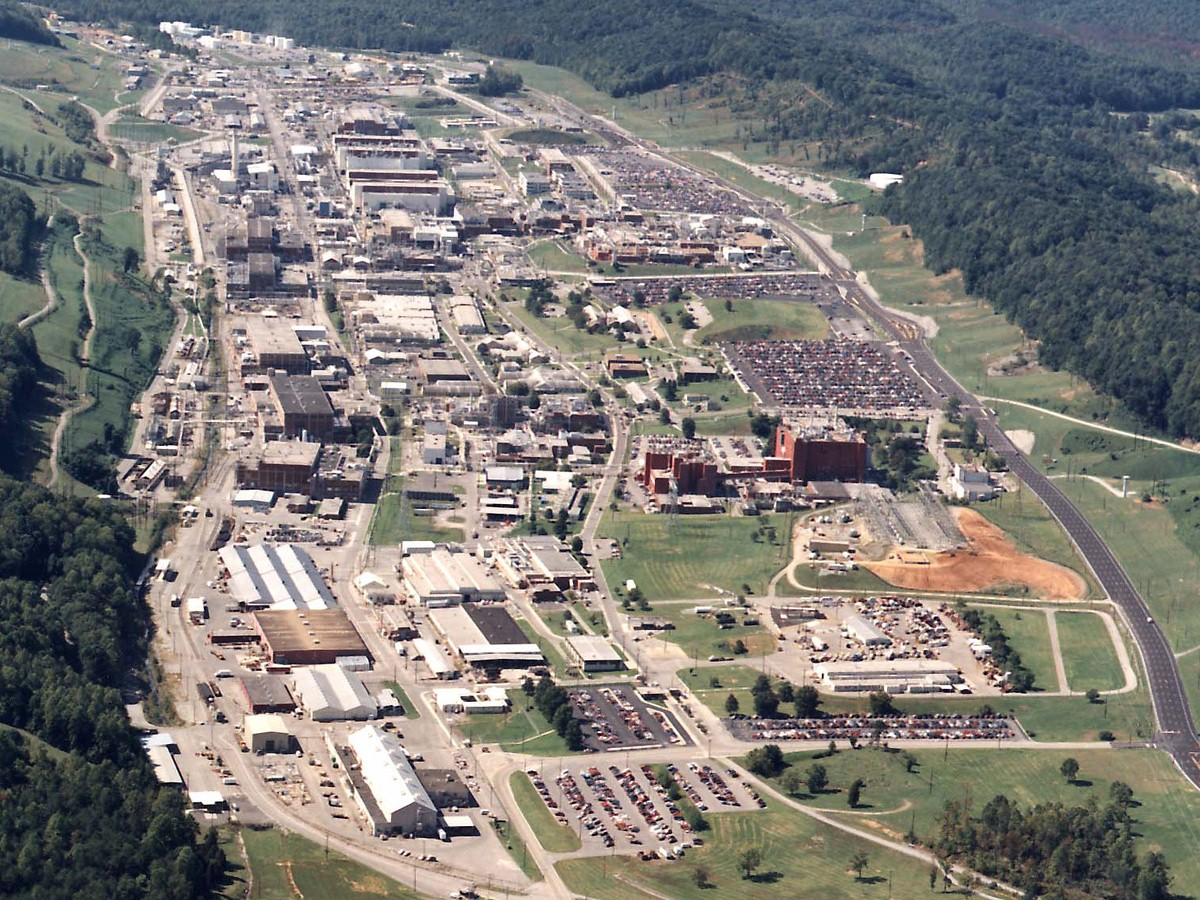
- Y-12 National Security Complex in Oak Ridge, Tennessee
- Country: United States of America
- Location: Oak Ridge, Tennessee
- Coordinates: 35°59′18″N 84°15′17″W
- Status: Operational
- Construction began: February 1943
- Commission date: November 1943
- Owner: National Nuclear Security Administration
- Operator: Consolidated Nuclear Security
- Employees: 8,600

External links
- Website: https://www.y12.doe.gov/
- Commons: Related media on Commons

The Y-12 National Security Complex is a United States Department of Energy National Nuclear Security Administration facility located in Oak Ridge, Tennessee, near Oak Ridge National Laboratory. It was built as part of the Manhattan Project for the purpose of enriching uranium for the first atomic bombs. In the years after World War II, it has been operated as a manufacturing facility for nuclear weapons components.

Y-12 is managed and operated under contract by Consolidated Nuclear Security (CNS), which is composed of member companies Bechtel, Leidos, Orbital ATK, and SOC, with Booz Allen Hamilton as a teaming subcontractor.

== History ==
Employees of the Manhattan Project operating calutron control panels at Y-12, in a US government photo by Ed Westcott.

Y-12 is the World War II code name for the electromagnetic isotope separation plant producing enriched uranium at the Clinton Engineer Works in Oak Ridge, Tennessee, as part of the Manhattan Project. Construction began in February 1943 under the management of Stone & Webster. Because of a wartime shortage of copper, the massive electromagnetic coils were made with 14,700 tons of coinage silver from U.S. government vaults at West Point. Colonel Kenneth D. Nichols met with Under Secretary of the Treasury Daniel W. Bell and requested between five and ten thousand tons of silver. Bell's stunned reply was, "Colonel, in the Treasury we do not speak of tons of silver; our unit is the troy ounce." Thus the Manhattan Engineer District requested and was loaned 395 million troy ounces (13,500 short tons; 12,300 t) from the West Point Depository for the duration of the Manhattan Project. Special guards and accountants were assigned to the silver, and their responsible caretaking meant that at the end of the war, less than 0.036% (14,220 oz t) of the roughly $300 million ($5.91 billion in 2025) of loaned silver was lost to the process, equal to $10.8 million (equivalent to $212.81 million in 2025), with the remainder returned to the Treasury.

The Y-12 facility began operating in November 1943, separating uranium-235 from natural uranium, which is 99.3% uranium-238, by using calutrons to perform electromagnetic isotope separation. Y-12 separated the uranium-235 for Little Boy, the nuclear weapon that was dropped on Hiroshima, Japan on August 6, 1945. K-25, another facility in Oak Ridge, produced enriched uranium using gaseous diffusion. K-25 began operating in March 1945 and fed slightly enriched uranium to Y-12's Beta Calutrons as the push to obtain enough uranium-235 for Little Boy came in the early summer of 1945. The S-50 Thermal Diffusion Plant at the K-25 site also provided feed material for the calutrons.

Tennessee Eastman was hired by the Army Corps of Engineers to manage Y-12 during the Manhattan Project. The company transferred scientists from Kingsport, Tennessee, to Y-12 and operated the plant from 1943 to May 1947. The Y-12 electromagnetic plant units were initially operated by scientists from UC Berkeley to remove bugs and achieve a reasonable operating rate. They were then turned over to trained Tennessee Eastman operators who had only a high school education. Nichols compared unit production data and pointed out to physicist Ernest Lawrence that the young "hillbilly" girl operators were outproducing his doctorate-holding scientists. They agreed to a production race and Lawrence lost, a morale boost for the Tennessee Eastman workers and supervisors. The girls were "trained like soldiers not to reason why", while "the scientists could not refrain from time-consuming investigation of the cause of even minor fluctuations of the dials". The young women that worked in this capacity came to be known as "Calutron Girls."

The Union Carbide corporation succeeded Tennessee Eastman as the operating contractor in 1947, remaining until 1984 when Union Carbide relinquished the contract for operating the Department of Energy (DOE) facilities at Oak Ridge, and the Martin Marietta corporation (later Lockheed Martin) won the contract to take over the operation. BWXT Y-12 (name later changed to B&W Y-12) succeeded Lockheed Martin as the Y-12 operator in November 2000.

=== 1958 criticality incident ===
At 11 p.m. on June 16, 1958, a criticality accident occurred in the C-1 Wing of Building 9212 at the facility, operating under the management of Union Carbide. A solution of highly enriched uranium was mistakenly diverted into a steel drum, causing a fission reaction of 15–20 minutes duration. Eight workers were hospitalized for moderate to severe radiation sickness or exposure, but all eventually returned to work.

In June 1960, the eight workers (Bill Wilburn, O. C. Collins, Travis Rogers, R. D. Jones, Howard Wagner, T. W. Stinnett, Paul McCurry, and Bill Clark) filed suit against the Atomic Energy Commission. The suit was settled out-of-court. Wilburn, who had received the highest radiation dose, was awarded $18,000 (approximately $195,000 in 2024). Clark received $9,000 (worth approximately $97,200 in 2024). Under the Energy Employees Occupational Illness Compensation Program, the eight later received additional compensation from the government; Clark collected multiple payments totaling about $250,000. Most, if not all, of the eight victims were diagnosed with cancer at some point during their lives. As of 2023, Clark is the only surviving member of the eight.

=== 1999 explosion ===
A chemical explosion injured several workers at the Y-12 facility on December 8, 1999, when NaK was cleaned up after an accidental spill, inappropriately treated with mineral oil, and inadvertently ignited when the surface coating of potassium superoxide was scratched by a metal tool.

=== 2023 fire ===
At 9 a.m. on February 22, 2023, a fire broke out in a uranium processing area of Building 9212. In a statement from the National Nuclear Security Administration, the fire was said to be contained later the same day.

== Facilities and missions ==
Y-12's primary missions since the end of the Cold War have been to support defense needs through stockpile stewardship, assist on issues of nuclear non-proliferation, support the Naval Reactors program, and provide expertise to other federal agencies. Y-12 is also responsible for the maintenance and production of all uranium parts and "secondary" mechanisms for every nuclear weapon in the United States arsenal.

Y-12 has a history of providing secure storage of nuclear material for the United States and other governments. Early efforts focused on securing material from the former Soviet Union; recent activities have included recovery of highly enriched uranium from Chile. Environmental cleanup has been an ongoing issue for the DOE in Oak Ridge. The Y-12 plant was listed as a Superfund site in the 1990s for groundwater and soil contamination. The Y-12 plant was listed on the DOE's Cleanup Criteria/Decision Document Database (or C2D2 database). An influx of funding from the 2009 American Recovery and Reinvestment Act benefited cleanup efforts by funding demolition and decontamination of aging facilities. These efforts work to further the long-term reduction in the size of the Y-12 facility.

Y-12 employs approximately 8,600 people, including subcontractors. About 1,500 personnel work onsite as employees of organizations that include UT-Battelle, Science Applications International Corporation, UCOR, and WSI Oak Ridge (an American-controlled unit of G4S Secure Solutions), which holds the security contract for the site. Workers at the site were represented by the Oil, Chemical and Atomic Workers International Union.

== Anti-nuclear protests ==
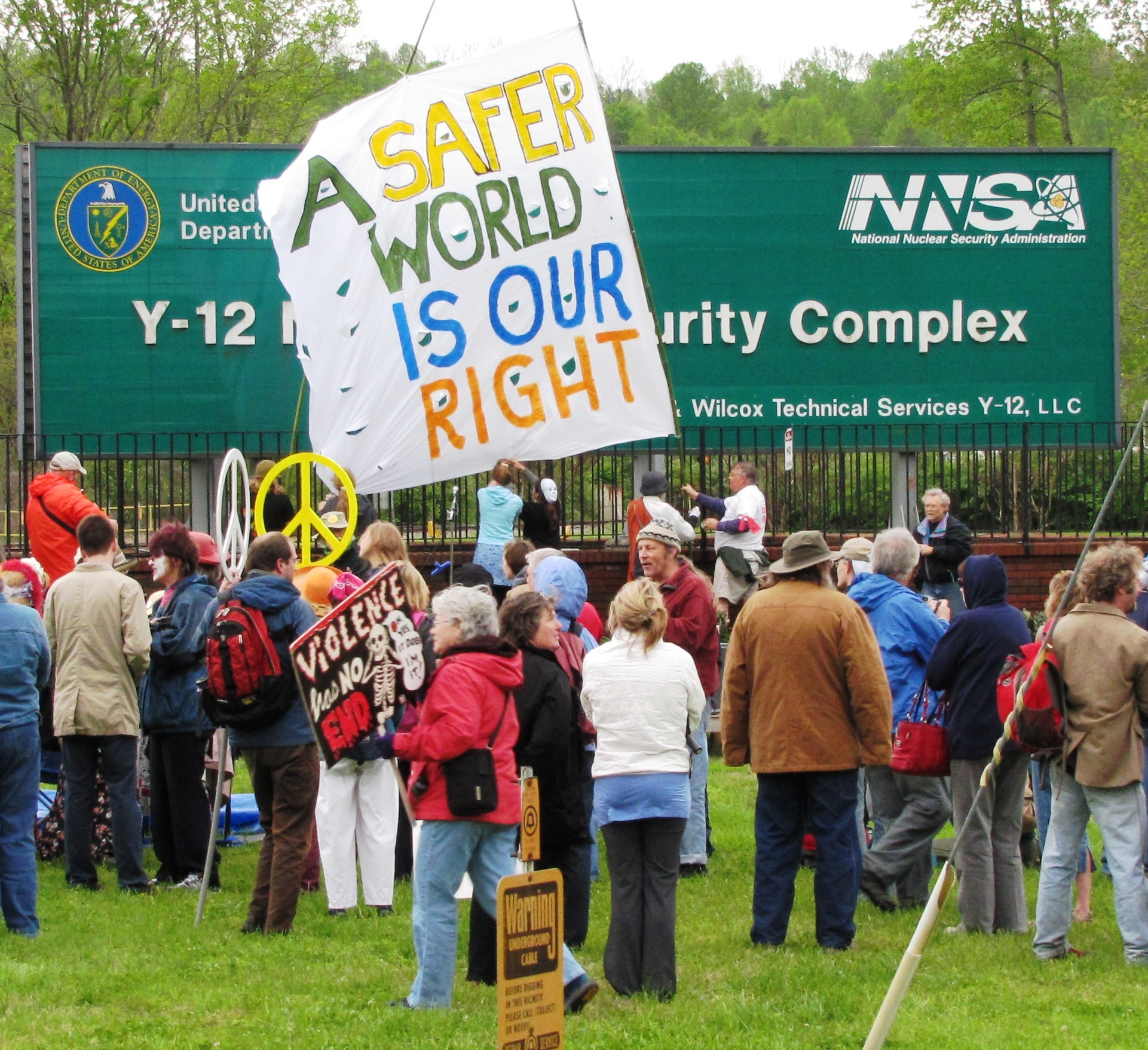
April 2011 Oak Ridge Environmental Peace Alliance rally at the Y-12 entrance

Since 1988, Oak Ridge Environmental Peace Alliance has organized non-violent direct action protests at the Y-12 complex in an effort to close down the weapons plant. Sister Mary Dennis Lentsch, a Catholic nun, has been arrested many times for protesting at the Oak Ridge facility. She has said, "I believe the continuing weapons production at the Y-12 National Security Complex in Oak Ridge, Tennessee, is in direct violation of the treaty obligations of the United States and consequently, is a violation of Article 6 of the U.S. Constitution".

In 2011, William J. Bichsel, an 84-year-old priest, received a sentence of three months for trespassing on federal property at the Y-12 complex. In 2012, there were protests about the new uranium processing facility.

In July 2012, Sister Megan Rice, an 82-year-old Catholic sister of the Society of the Holy Child Jesus, and two military veterans, Gregory Boertje-Obed, and Michael Walli, entered the Y-12 complex. They were all Plowshares activists, and they chose Y-12 because of its crucial role in the production of nuclear weapons. They spray-painted anti-war slogans on the exterior of the Highly Enriched Uranium Materials Facility, a structure for storing weapons-grade uranium. The anti-nuclear activists, who got past fences and disabled security sensors before dawn on July 28, spent several hours in the complex, spray-painted peace messages, and prayed and sang before they were stopped by guards. The security breach prompted private experts to criticize the Department of Energy's safeguarding of nuclear materials. The DOE-OIG found that all of the defenses for the plant were insufficient and that the security response had "troubling displays of ineptitude." On May 9, 2013, the three were convicted of sabotage. In her testimony, Sister Rice said, "I regret I didn't do this 70 years ago."

== See also ==
- Anti-nuclear protests in the United States
- COLEX process (isotopic separation)
- Fogbank
- Pantex
- Hanford Site
