= Kenneth William Tobin =

Kenneth William Tobin is an engineer at the Oak Ridge National Laboratory/ UT-Battelle LLC in Oak Ridge, Tennessee. He was named a Fellow of the Institute of Electrical and Electronics Engineers (IEEE) in 2012 for his contributions to computer vision technology for instrumentation and measurement.
