= Hensel Phelps Construction =

American general contractor

Coordinates: 40.428937°N 104.687098°W

Hensel Phelps Construction Co.
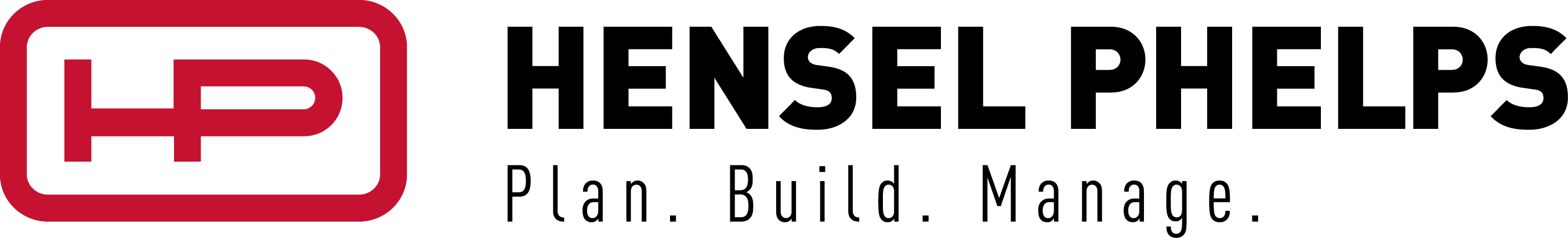
- Type: Private (Employee-owned)
- Industry: Construction, real estate development, facilities management
- Founded: 1937
- Founder: Abel Hensel Phelps
- Headquarters: Greeley, Colorado, US
- Key people: Michael (Mike) Choutka (Chairman of the Board); Brad Jeanneret (President & CEO); Jennifer Scholz (CFO)
- Revenue: US$8.2 billion (2025)
- Number of employees: 5,000 (2025)
- Website: www.henselphelps.com

Hensel Phelps Construction Co., located in Greeley, Colorado, is one of the largest general contractors and construction managers in the United States, ranked consistently among Engineering News-Record's top 20 Contractors by revenue. The company was founded in 1937.

== History ==
Founded in 1937 by Abel Hensel Phelps as a small, local builder in Greeley, Colorado, Hensel Phelps has become a multibillion-dollar, employee-owned national contractor with an eclectic portfolio of completed projects. Hensel Phelps currently has 11 district offices across the country, as well as additional regional offices.

In August 2021, Hensel Phelps announced its acquisition of Colorado-based Hydro Construction, which specializes in the construction of water and wastewater treatment facilities.

In October 2024, Hensel Phelps was awarded a $274.7 million contract by the General Services Administration to build and expand a border station in Douglas, Arizona.

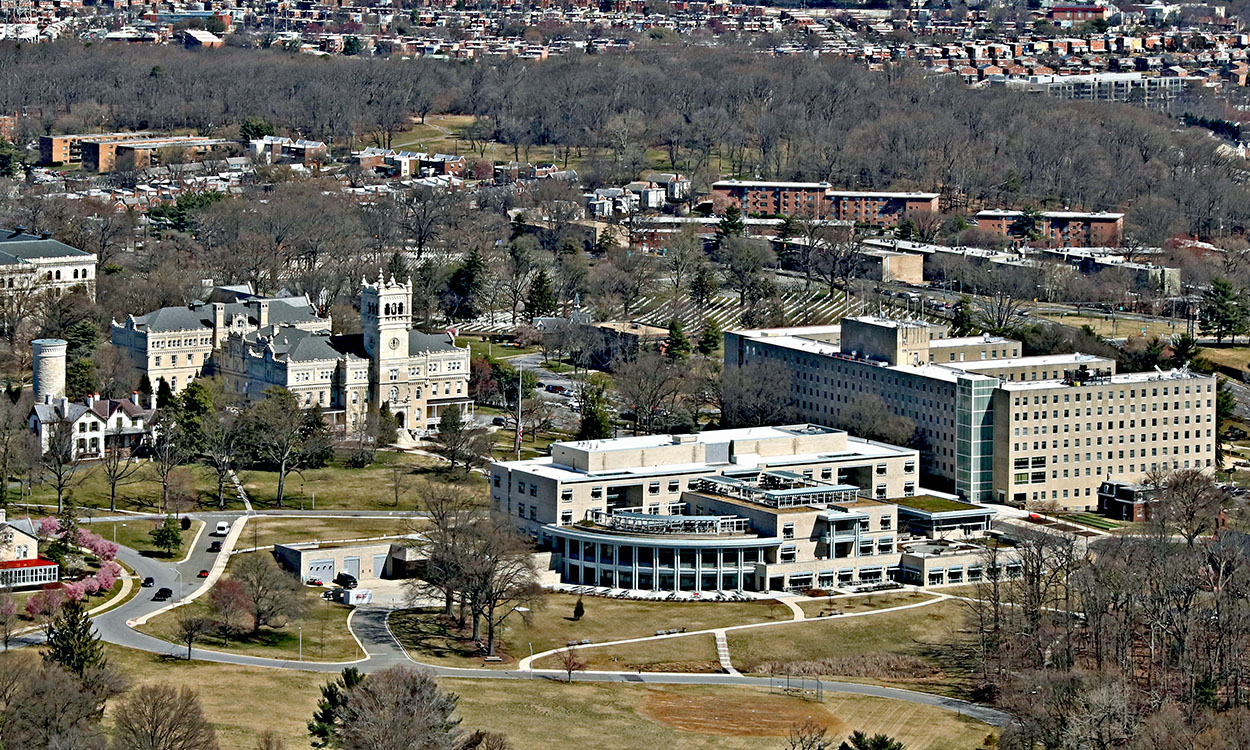
Hensel Phelps Construction; Armed Forces Retirement Home, Washington, DC

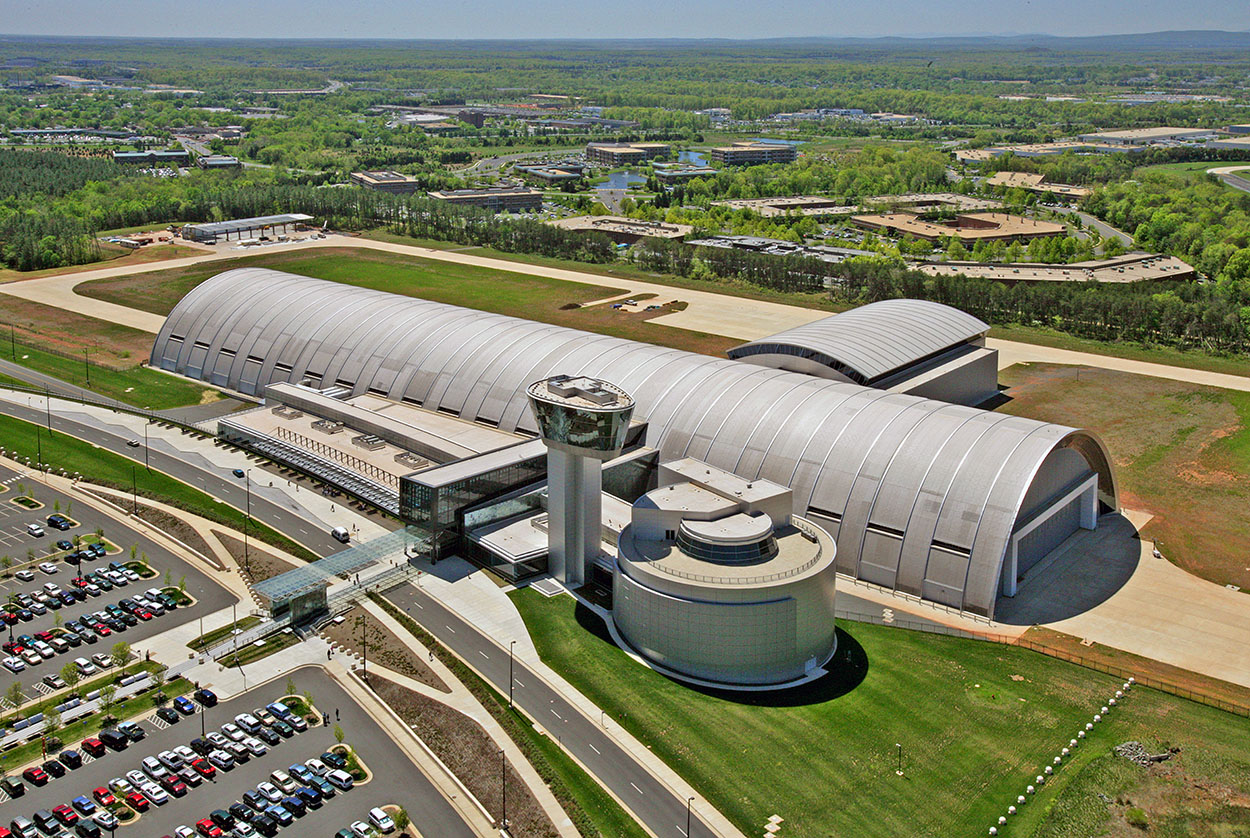
Hensel Phelps Construction; NASM Dulles, April 2006

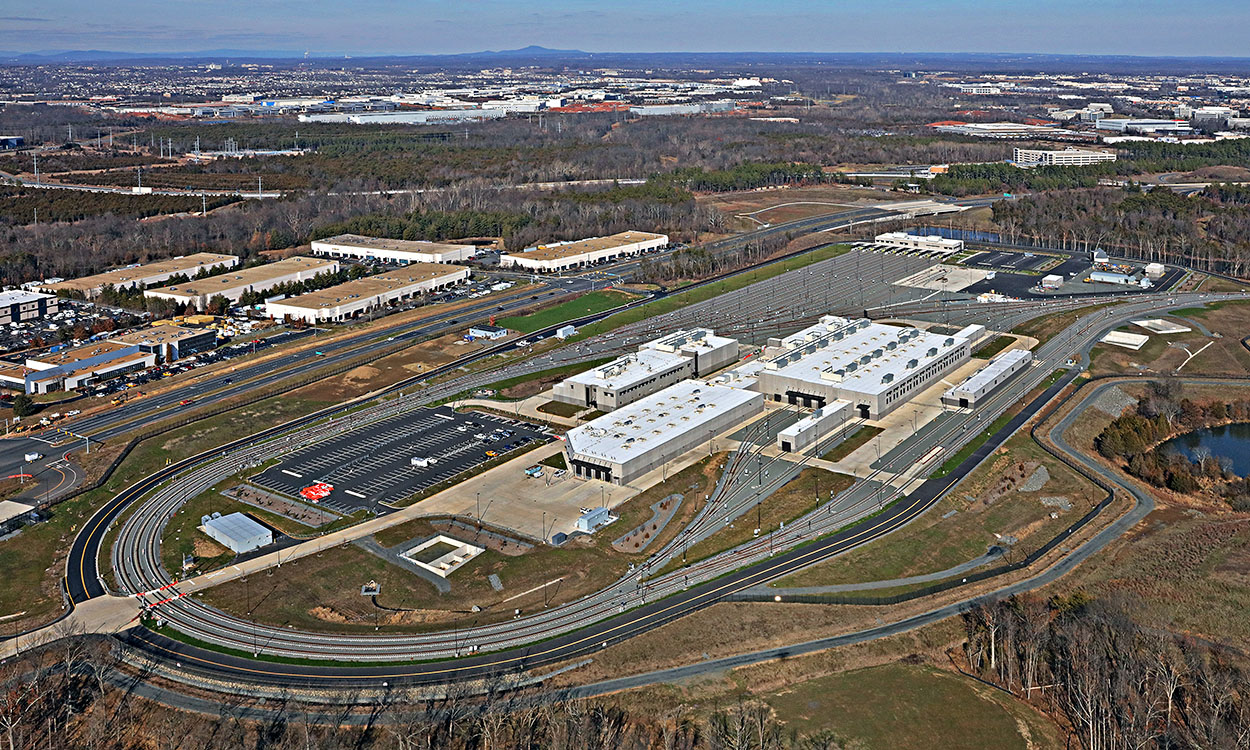
Hensel Phelps Construction; Dulles Rail-yard & Maintenance Facility

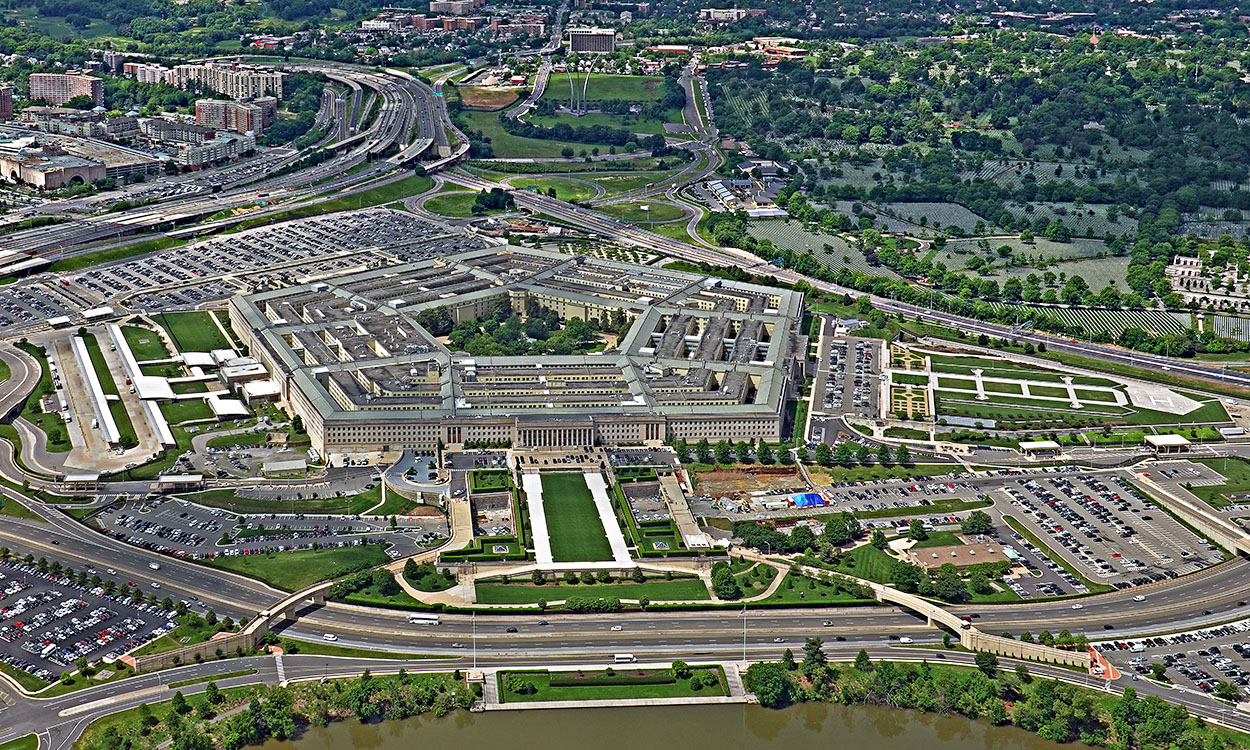
Hensel Phelps Construction Company; Pentagon Renovations, 2001–2010

== Awards ==
Hensel Phelps was named number one on Building Design and Construction's Top 60 Airport Facility Construction Firm for 2024.

== See also ==
- Top 100 US Federal Contractors
