= M1 Support Services =

American military contracting company

M1 Support Services is an American military contracting company. In 2025 it was listed by Defense News as the 94th largest defense company in the world. The M1 stands for "mission first."

== History ==
M1 was founded in 2003 and was awarded its first government contract in 2004. Cofounder Kathleen Hildreth has worked for competitor DynCorp from 1991 to 2003. Before working at DynCorp Hildreth was a helicopter pilot in the US Army.

In 2018 M1 was awarded a major $414.8 million contract to support the USAF's 80th Flying Training Wing.

In 2024 Cerberus Capital Management acquired a controlling stake in the company.

In 2025 M1 Support Services was listed as the 94th largest defense company in the world with $900 million in total revenue, all from defense contracts.

== Facilities ==
In 2025 the company opened a new office building in Enterprise, Alabama; they were already one of the largest employers in the Wiregrass region.

== See also ==
- Top 100 Contractors of the U.S. federal government
