= List of defense contractors =

A defense contractor is a business organization or individual that provides products or services to a military or intelligence department of a government. Products typically include military or civilian aircraft, ships, vehicles, weaponry, and electronic systems, while services can include logistics, technical support and training, communications support, and engineering support in cooperation with the government.

Security contractors do not generally provide direct support of military operations. Under the 1949 Geneva Conventions, military contractors engaged in direct support of military operations may be legitimate targets of military interrogation.

In the United States, defense contracting has taken an increasingly larger role. In 2009, the Department of Defense spent nearly $316 billion on contracts. Contractors have assumed a much larger on-the-ground presence during American conflicts: during the 1991 Gulf War the ratio of uniformed military to contractors was about 50 to 1, while during the first four years of the Iraq War the U.S. hired over 190,000 contractors, surpassing the total American military presence even during the 2007 Iraq surge and 23 times greater than other allied military personnel numbers. In Afghanistan, the presence of almost 100,000 contractors has resulted in a near 1-to-1 ratio with military personnel. The surge in spending on defense services contractors that began in 2001 came to a halt in 2009, leading to the Better Buying Power initiative of 2010. The Costs of War Project found that from 2020–2024 $2.4 trillion of the $4.4 trillion (approximately 54%) of the Pentagon’s discretionary spending went to defense contractors. During that period over twice as much money was spent with five companies as on diplomacy and international assistance. In 2024, the industry saw record revenues.

== List of companies ==
A defense contractor is a business organization or individual that provides products or services to a military or intelligence department of a government. Products typically include military or civilian aircraft, ships, vehicles, weaponry, and electronic systems, while services can include intelligence information, logistics, technical support and training, communications support, and engineering support in cooperation with the government.

Following is an incomplete list of defense contractors, based only on a list of the world's largest arms manufacturers and other military service companies, along with their countries of origin, published by the Stockholm International Peace Research Institute for 2024. The numbers are in millions of US dollars.

Rank	Country	Company name	Revenue from defense (US$ millions)	Total revenue (US$ millions)	% of total revenue from defense
1	United States	Lockheed Martin	64,650	71,040	91.0
2	United States	RTX Corporation	43,600	80,740	54.0
3	United States	Northrop Grumman	37,850	41,030	92.2
4	United Kingdom	BAE Systems	33,790	35,400	95.4
5	United States	General Dynamics	33,630	47,720	70.4
6	United States	Boeing	30,550	66,520	45.9
7	Russia	Rostec	27,120	38,890	69.7
8	China	Aviation Industry Corporation of China	20,320	81,290	25.0
9	China	China Electronics Technology Group Corporation	18,920	55,230	34.3
10	United States	L3Harris	16,210	21,330	76.0
11	China	Norinco	13,970	61,580	22.7
12	Italy	Leonardo	13,830	19,210	72.0
13	EU	Airbus	13,370	74,890	17.9
14	China	China State Shipbuilding Corporation	12,330	49,630	24.8
15	France	Thales Group	11,800	22,260	53.0
16	United States	Huntington Ingalls Industries	10,280	11,540	89.1
17	China	China Aerospace Science and Technology Corporation	10,230	34,100	30.0
18	United States	Leidos	9,370	16,660	56.2
19	United States	Amentum	8,330	13,860	60.1
20	Germany	Rheinmetall	8,240	10,550	78.1
21	South Korea	Hanwha Group	7,970	64,100	12.4
22	United States	Booz Allen Hamilton	7,810	11,980	65.2
23	United Kingdom	Rolls-Royce Holdings	7,200	22,810	31.6
24	United States	CACI	6,510	8,630	75.4
25	Israel	Elbit Systems	6,280	6,830	91.9
26	China	Aero Engine Corporation of China	6,260		
27	United States	Honeywell	5,780	38,500	15.8
28	Sweden	Saab AB	5,550	6,030	92.0
29	France	Safran	5,320	29,550	18.0
30	EU	MBDA	5,260	5,310	99.1
31	Israel	Israel Aerospace Industries	5,190	6,110	84.9
32	Japan	Mitsubishi Heavy Industries	5,030	33,190	15.2
33	United States	General Electric	4,890	38,700	12.6
34	Israel	Rafael Advanced Defense Systems	4,700	4,800	97.9
35	United States	KBR	4,680	7,740	60.4
36	France	Naval Group	4,660	4,710	98.9
37	United Arab Emirates	EDGE Group	4,660	4,900	95.1
38	China	China South Industries Group	4,580	44,680	10.3
39	United Kingdom	Babcock International Group	4,570	6,170	74.1
40	France	Dassault Aviation	4,290	6,740	63.6
41	Russia	United Shipbuilding Corporation	4,110	4,960	82.9
42	EU	KNDS	4,110	4,110	100.0
43	United States	Science Applications International Corporation	3,890	7,480	52.0
44	India	Hindustan Aeronautics	3,810	4,010	95.0
45	United States	Vectrus	3,760	4,320	87.0
46	Czech Republic	Czechoslovak Group	3,630	4,340	83.6
47	Turkey	ASELSAN	3,470	3,660	94.8
48	United States	Textron	3,290	13,700	24.0
49	United States	TransDigm Group	3,180	7,940	40.1
50	Taiwan	National Chung-Shan Institute of Science and Technology	3,110	3,190	97.4

== See also ==
- Arms industry
- Government contractor
- List of private military companies
- List of United States defense contractors
- Military–industrial complex
- Private intelligence agency
- Private military company
