= Consolidated Nuclear Security =

U.S. defense contractor joint venture

Consolidated Nuclear Security, LLC
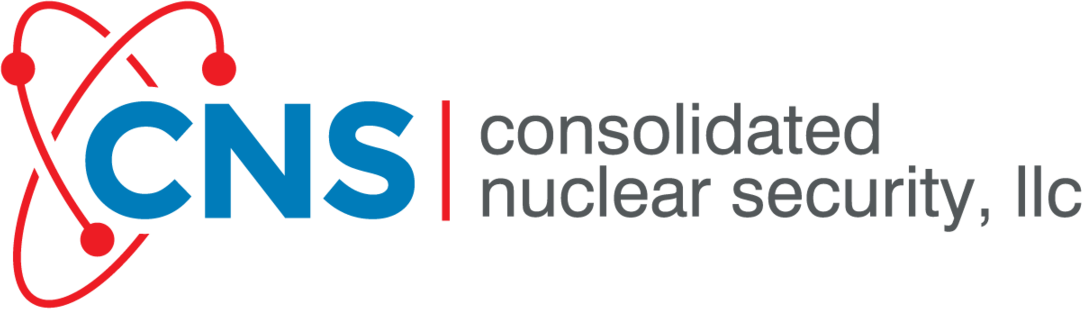
- Company type: Joint venture
- Industry: Defense
- Founded: 2012; 14 years ago
- Headquarters: Oak Ridge, Tennessee
- Owner: Bechtel; Leidos; Northrop Grumman Innovation Systems; SOC
- Website: cns-llc.us

Consolidated Nuclear Security is an American federal contractor that manages the Y-12 National Security Complex.

Consolidated Nuclear Security is a joint venture of Bechtel, Leidos, Northrop Grumman Innovation Systems and SOC. Booz Allen Hamilton is a teaming subcontractor.

The company is among the 100 largest federal contractors in the United States.

== History ==
Early in the 2010s, the Department of Energy issued a tender for the combined management of the Y-12 and Pantex facilities on a ten-year contract. CNS won this contract and began management of the two facilities in 2014. The contract was worth approximately $2 billion a year.

In 2020, the Department of Energy announced that they would not be exercising the additional options in Consolidated Nuclear Security's contract, which was set to expire on Sept. 30, 2021, three years before the end of the ten-year contract. The Department of Energy terminated the contract for failing to meet performance standards. The situation was made trickier because Bechtel is building the Uranium Processing Facility at Y-12 as a subcontractor to CNS. The primary issues that led to the contract cancellation were repeated failures to meet safety and security standards, with criticality safety and cyber security, being particular concerns.

== See also ==
- Oak Ridge, Tennessee
