= Coins 'N Things =

- Company type: Private
- Industry: Wholesale trade
- Founded: 1973
- Headquarters: Bridgewater, Massachusetts, United States of America
- Key people: Mark L. Oliari
- Products: Precious metals
- Revenue: $6.5 billion
- Number of employees: 50
- Website: www.cnt.us

Coins 'N Things, also known as CNT Inc., is a privately held, family-controlled business in Bridgewater, Massachusetts, that was established as a retail shop for coin collectors and is now the largest wholesale vendor of gold in the United States.

== History ==
Coins 'N Things was started in 1973 by Louis Oliari, an engineer and coin collector. His teenaged son Mark had also become deeply engaged in coin collecting, and the father thought that if he indulged his son's hobby interest by operating a small storefront coin trading shop, Mark would eventually "get bored" with the hobby and "get [it] out of [his] system.” However, after high school, Mark Oliari went to work in the business full-time and later his father left his corporate job to join him.

Some time after both Oliaris had started working in the business full-time, Coins ’N Things entered the wholesale metals market. While Louis Oliari preferred the retail coin business, Mark Oliari enjoyed trading gold with investors, jewelers, and businesses that needed gold as a raw material. As the wholesale business grew, it began to attain the reputation and financial stature needed to be a leader in that industry. In 2002, the United States Mint approved Coins 'N Things to become one of 11 businesses worldwide authorized to buy American Eagle silver bullion coins for distribution; at that time, qualifications for that authorization included a substantial retail customer base and net worth of at least $5 million.

After his father's death in 2008, Mark Oliari closed the retail shop to focus exclusively on metals trading. A line of credit from Wells Fargo provided the financial resources needed to pursue U.S. government business on a large scale. In 2010 the business obtained approval to sell gold to the U.S. federal government.

In fiscal year 2011, the company became the U.S. federal government's largest supplier of precious metals, with government gold sales that accounted for about half of the $3.8 billion in contracts to supply silver and gold to the United States Mint during the year. Coins 'N Things ranked number 39 on the list of the top 100 contractors of the U.S. federal government for that same fiscal year, with $1.89 billion in obligations from the government, all from the Treasury Department. It was the single largest contractor to the Treasury Department and the largest gold vendor in the U.S.

== Revenue ==
The business has about 50 employees, including Mark Oliari, his wife Patty, and three children. There are no outside investors. As of 2011, estimated annual revenue was $6.5 billion. The company does not report its net revenues or profits, but Mark Oliari told news media that it retains about 0.25% of the value of transactions involving private customers and a bit less from sales to the government. Gold is obtained from producers in the United States and Canada, with about 40% coming from a refinery owned by the Canadian government.
