= TriWest Healthcare Alliance =

Health benefit management corporation

- Type: Private
- Industry: Health benefits
- Founded: Phoenix, Arizona (1996)
- Headquarters: Phoenix, Arizona, U.S.
- Area served: VAPCCC Regions 1, 2, 3, 4, 5, and 6; TRICARE West
- Key people: David J. McIntyre Jr., President and CEO; Elizabeth Kinsley, Exec. VP and CFO; Dr. James L. Robbins, CMO; James Griffith, CNAO; Donna Hoffmeier, SVP; Jeanne Ong, CHCO; Julie Townsend, CPIO
- Website: Homepage

TriWest Healthcare Alliance is a Phoenix, Arizona, based corporation that manages health benefits under the United States Department of Veterans Affairs (VA) VAPCCC program in Regions 3, 5, and 6. On October 1, 2018, TriWest's contract for VAPCCC was expanded to cover Regions 1, 2, and 4.

As of January 1, 2025, TriWest took over the TRICARE West Region contract from Health Net Federal Services, LLC. The TRICARE West region now encompasses these states:

- Arkansas
- Alaska
- Arizona
- California
- Colorado
- Hawaii
- Idaho
- Illinois
- Iowa
- Kansas
- Louisiana
- Minnesota
- Missouri
- Montana
- Nebraska
- Nevada
- New Mexico
- North Dakota
- Oklahoma
- Oregon
- South Dakota
- Texas
- Utah
- Washington
- Wisconsin
- Wyoming

TriWest owners include Blue Shield of California, Regence Blue Shield, Blue Cross Blue Shield of Arizona, the University of Colorado Hospital Authority, and the University of New Mexico Hospital.

== History ==
In 1996, TriWest Healthcare Alliance was established in order to compete for a U.S. Government contract to manage civilian health care benefits under the newly established TRICARE program within the 16-state TRICARE Central Region, also known as Regions 7 and 8. In 1996, TriWest was awarded the contract for the TRICARE Central Region and began operations.

The TRICARE Central Region included the following states:

- Arizona
- Colorado
- Southern Idaho
- Iowa
- Kansas
- Minnesota
- Missouri
- Montana
- Nebraska
- Nevada
- New Mexico
- North Dakota
- South Dakota
- El Paso, Texas
- Utah
- Wyoming

TriWest was awarded an extension to this contract, which continued until 2004.

On August 21, 2003, TriWest was awarded the TRICARE Managed Care Support Contract for the TRICARE West Region. The five-year contract, valued at approximately $10 billion, expanded TriWest's service area to 21 states and 2.7 million beneficiaries with the addition of Alaska, California, Hawaii, northern Idaho, Oregon, and Washington.

On July 13, 2009, TriWest was awarded the contract (also known as the "T-3 contract") to continue providing military families access to health care and manage the 21-state TRICARE West Region for the Department of Defense (DoD).

On March 16, 2012, it was announced that the T-3 West Region contract was awarded to Minnesota-based UnitedHealth Group. The contract was worth $20.5 billion

On March 26, 2012, it was announced that TriWest will protest the Department of Defense award of the contract to UnitedHealth. David McIntyre (President and CEO of the TriWest Healthcare Alliance) cited the long history of performance and legal problems with the subsidiary which would handle the T-3 contract.

On July 2, 2012, it was announced that TriWest lost its appeal to keep the West Region contract.

In September 2011, TriWest paid $10 million to settle a Justice Department lawsuit after whistle-blowers claimed TriWest "systematically defrauded" Tricare by billing the government higher rates than they had negotiated with health care providers. The lawsuit also said TriWest sent 3,000 claims through one location a day to intentionally bypass checks to avoid late-payment fees and that it paid claims for ineligible beneficiaries.

In September 2017, VA Inspector General Michael J. Missal issued a memorandum that listed four major "errors" that had resulted in excess payments to TriWest. These were:

- Duplicate Errors – Payments for medical claims that have been paid more than once
- Other Health Insurance (OHI) Errors – Payments that were not adjusted for the amount OHI was responsible to pay the provider
- Pass-Through Errors – Payments to reimburse the TPA that were more than the TPA paid the provider
- Rate Errors – Payments that did not use the appropriate Medicare or contract adjusted rate.

Missal stated in his memorandum that duplicate payments alone racked up almost $40 million in overpayments to TriWest.

In December 2020, TriWest agreed to pay the United States $179,700,000 to resolve claims that it received overpayments from the U.S. Department of Veterans Affairs (VA) in connection with its administration of certain VA health care programs.

== See also ==
- Top 100 US Federal Contractors
