= Chemonics =

U.S. company

Chemonics International
- Type: Private
- Founded: 1975; 51 years ago
- Founder: Thurston F. (Tony) Teele
- Headquarters: 1275 New Jersey Avenue SE, Washington, D.C., U.S.
- Areas served: Global
- Key people: Jamey Butcher (Chairman and CEO); Anna Slother (President); Melissa Logan (CFO); Tetyana Dudka (COO); Louise Quy (President of Chemonics Europe); Ramesh Rajeswaran (President of Connexi)
- Services: Project delivery Applied technology Impact assessment Media, Data; Strategic partnerships
- Website: www.chemonics.com

Chemonics International Inc. is an international development and sustainability firm based in Washington, D.C. Established in 1975, the employee-owned company offers a variety of consultation and development services globally. The firm specializes in fields such as impact assessment, applied technology and data.

From 2008 to 2024, Chemonics was awarded over $17 billion in USAID contracts. As of 2024, it was the largest for-profit contractor for the U.S. Agency for International Development (USAID).

== Operations ==
Chemonics functions as a sustainable services firm, focusing on consultation and development through data, artificial intelligence and applied technology. The firm has received some of the U.S. government's largest aid contracts supporting agriculture, conflict and crisis, democracy, economic development, education, energy, governance, health care and supply chain, international trade, microfinance, sustainability, water, welfare reform, and youth programs. It has also been labeled a Beltway Bandit.

The firm offers capacity building, communications, corporate social responsibility, knowledge management, performance management and appraisal, and program design services, working on projects in more than 150 countries throughout Africa, Asia, Europe, Latin America and the Caribbean, and the Middle East. Funders have included the Overseas Private Investment Corporation, United Nations Development Programme, U.S. Agency for International Development (USAID), U.S. Trade and Development Agency, U.K. Department for International Development, World Bank, and GIZ. Chemonics has invested in the Transform Health Fund, which works to improve healthcare access in Africa.

== History ==
=== 1970s–2000s ===
Chemonics was established as a subsidiary of Erly Industries in 1975 by Thurston Teele, with support from Gerald D. Murphy, the parent company's CEO and largest shareholder. Teele served as the first president of Chemonics until 2002, when he became chairman of the board of directors.

In 1993, The New York Times said the company received 98 percent of its revenue in the form of agency contracts and increased revenues four-fold over the past decade. Chemonics was awarded a $5 million, three-year contract in 1995 to manage the creation of Ukraine's Agricultural Commodity Exchange. In 1997, the company received funding to continue co-managing a privatization project for non-farm land in Ukraine. Chemonics reportedly earned contracts valued at $97 million in 1997 and $58 million in 1998. The company received US$15 million from the USAID between 1996 and 2003.

In mid-2002, the company was awarded a $2.9 million contract to hire 3,000 locals to repair acequia and roads in Afghanistan's Shomali Plain. In Haiti, during the 2000s, Chemonics worked on agriculture programs, the Famine Early Warning Systems Network, and the "WINNER" project, which promoted the farming of Jatropha curcas to serve as biofuel. In 2008, an audit by the Office of Inspector General found that the buildings constructed by subcontractors in Afghanistan had significant construction defects.

Chemonics ranked number 70 in Washington Technology's 2009 list of the "top 100" largest government contractors based on revenue for the 2008 fiscal year and had approximately 3,200 employees at the time.

=== 2010s ===
Chemonics ranked number 51 in Washington Technology's "top 100" list in 2010. The following year, Chemonics became 100 percent employee-owned through its employee stock ownership program.

In 2012, Chemonics was the largest single recipient of post-earthquake funds from USAID, many of which were "no-bid". The firm spent 75 percent of program budgets on material and equipment when an expenditure of only 30 percent was planned; Chemonics claimed that the evaluation of USAID's earthquake recovery program revealed incorrect information, thereby making it difficult to form a comprehensive plan. While Chemonics stated that more than 90 percent of the staff on USAID's two largest Chemonics-implemented programs were Haitian, a report found that these contractors brought their own people to do the jobs instead of hiring locals. Chemonics awarded $96.3 million in grants and subcontracts directly to Haitian organizations over a five-year period.

Chemonics received USAID funding in early 2014 to operate the Sindh Reading Programme to improve literacy in Sindh, Pakistan. The company had received $501.7 million from USAID by November 2014. Chemonics worked with USAID to help three coastal cities in Mozambique adapt to climate change. As part of the work, Chemonics and USAID constructed model homes to teach residents about low-cost solutions to protect homes during storms.

In 2016, Chemonics launched the Blockchain for Development Solutions Lab, becoming the first U.S. international development company to develop blockchain technology. The lab aims to support financial inclusion and make business processes more efficient. Chemonics was also the leading contractor for USAID in 2016. That same year, Chemonics agreed to sponsor nonprofit diversity events and create a training program for local high school students as part of a settlement with the U.S. Department of Labor. The firm attributed the pattern of discrimination in its hiring process to a manual application system and corrected these software problems, resulting in the hiring of eight applicants.

The firm ranked number 44 and number 28 in Washington Technology's 2016 and 2017 lists of "Top 100 Contractors".

Through USAID, Chemonics has supported the White Helmets, a volunteer organization formed during the Syrian Civil War and operating in parts of rebel-controlled Syria and in Turkey. Funding from USAID and the Partnership Initiatives in the Niger Delta allowed Chemonics to operate the Strengthening Advocacy and Civic Engagement governance project in Nigeria from 2014 to 2018. In 2015, USAID awarded Chemonics a $9.5 billion, eight-year IDIQ contract, the agency's largest award to date. The contract funds health supply chain programs to prevent and treat HIV/AIDS, malaria, and tuberculosis. In 2017, Devex reported that only 7 percent of the health commodity shipments delivered through the program arrived "on time and in full". Chemonics acknowledged the challenges, saying it undertook a "foundational change," by restructuring "how the project itself functioned from a management perspective". In Year 4, October 1, 2018 through September 30, 2019, 85 percent of health commodity shipments were delivered on time and in full. During that same period the project procured nearly $544 million and delivered almost $699 million in drugs, diagnostics, and other health commodities.

In 2018, USAID awarded a $37 million contract for Chemonics to operate the "Promote" program in Afghanistan, which seeks to help women find employment in the civil society, private, and public sectors.

The company ranked number 19 on Washington Technology's "top 100" list in 2018 and reportedly earned contracts valued at $1.613 billion. It was awarded a 2018 Industry Innovator award for its Blockchain for Development Solutions Lab. Chemonics partnered with Arizona State University to incorporate minimasters programming into staff training and development. Also in 2018, the Council of the District of Columbia approved a $5.2 million property tax break for Chemonics' headquarters relocation, despite opposition by member Elissa Silverman who objected to the company's troubled history of discriminatory hiring. Two years later, construction began.

In 2019, Chemonics established an office in London, United Kingdom, to increase its aid work with the UK's Department for International Development and Foreign, Commonwealth and Development Office.

=== 2020s ===
In June 2020, Chemonics was added to the defendant's list of a lawsuit as to whether the firm may have violated the Anti-Terrorism Act. In 2024, a report by Center for Advanced Defense Studies said that Chemonics purchased products sanctioned by Xinjiang Production and Construction Corps.

In 2023, Chemonics launched an investigation, finding that the firm was exposed to a cyberattack; hackers had access to information through January 9, 2024.

In 2024, Chemonics acquired Luvent Consulting, a Berlin-based sustainable development company, and launched an instant payment system in the Philippines called Higala, which links small banks and microfinance groups. Chemonics also agreed to pay $3.1 million to the U.S. government that year in relation to a USAID fraudulent billing.

As a result of the Trump administration’s cancellation of USAID contracts, Chemonics filed notice to reduce its workforce by five hundred employees in May 2025.

In July 2025, the firm acquired business services company DMI Associates. The following year, Chemonics opened an office in Syria to expand its support of education, emergency response, and other recovery efforts in cooperation with local Syrian institutions.

In 2026, Chemonics acquired 35 South Advisors and JID, expanding its public sector advisory, infrastructure, international development, and program implementation across Australia and the Indo-Pacific region.
