= SLSCO =

Construction company based in Galveston, Texas

SLSCO LTD. is a Galveston, Texas based construction and disaster response contractor. SLSCO works for government and private industry sectors, specializing in the comprehensive rehabilitation, reconstruction and recovery of communities impacted by emergencies and disasters.

SLSCO participated in the expansion of the major marine terminal industrial site development of Texas International Terminals, a world-class liquid and dry bulk multi-modal facility for deep draft vessel, unit train, manifest rail, barge, and trucking along the Galveston Ship Channel.

Between 2010 and 2016, SLSCO participated in the Build It Back Program, New York City’s permanent housing recovery initiative to rebuild homes destroyed after Hurricane Sandy on a $290 million contract, returning over 750 families to their homes.

They also were awarded a $180 million contract for restoring and/or reconstructing over 2500 safe, compliant Green Building certified homes after Hurricane Maria in 40 municipalities in Puerto Rico.

Additionally, SLSCO was responsible for the community reconstruction of schools, clinics, community centers, fire stations, and other facilities in four Haitian villages after the 2010 Haiti earthquake. Following 2017’s Hurricane Harvey, SLSCO was awarded a contract to complete ongoing permanent rehabilitation, elevation, and reconstruction of homes across 30+ Texas counties.

SLSCO was awarded contracts to replace sections of the Mexico–United States border wall, including the $145 million for the first new sections completed in Hidalgo County, Texas, $147 million to replace sections near San Diego, California, and $61 million for a section in New Mexico. In 2020, SLSCO was awarded contracts to build alternate care sites at the USTA Billie Jean King National Tennis Center near Queens, New York City, and another at the Brooklyn Cruise Terminal. The hospitals were designed to reduce patient overflow at surrounding hospitals. With a capacity for 470 beds, Billie Jean King was constructed in only 11 days. The $17 million cruise terminal hospital had 630 beds and opened in May after New York City's coronavirus peak; hospital populations had fallen in half, and the facility was closed as social distancing measures improved. SLSCO, together with other contractors, performed a portion of the work for Florida’s $283 million commitment to build overflow hospitals. SLSCO was awarded $4.6 million for the emergency rehabilitation and conversion of a vacant hospital once known as Pan American Hospital, into 200+ bed COVID-19 patient care facility.

SLSCO received a contract in 2022 to operate four Humanitarian Emergency Response and Relief Centers (HERRCs) for migrants throughout New York City, serving over 12,800 asylum seekers.

In 2025, SLSCO completed the first home in the RenewNC program to rebuild homes devastated by Hurricane Helene.

== See also ==
- USNS Comfort
- Javits Center
- Fisher Industries
