= Washington Technology =

- Frequency: Bimonthly
- Circulation: 40,000
- First issue: 1986
- Country: United States
- Based in: Falls Church, Virginia
- Website: washingtontechnology.com

Washington Technology is a United States magazine for government contractors providing an in-depth look at government programs, technologies and spending priorities, as well as management issues, case studies M&A, and trends that impact the contractor community. It is published by 1105 Government Information Group.

Washington Technology is published semimonthly. Subscriptions are free upon request to technology executives and managers in technology-related corporations, federal agencies and associations.

Washington Technology also sponsors several events each year, including the Solutions Series.

== Washington Technology Lists ==
Washington Technology Fast 50 List: recognizes some of the most successful companies in the government market. These small businesses have experienced phenomenal growth over the past five years. The ranking provides in-depth information about these companies and their place in the market.

Washington Technology Top 25 8(a) Contractors List recognizes some of the most successful small businesses in the government market. The ranking provides in-depth information about these companies and their place in the market.

Washington Technology Top 100 Government Contractors List ranks the largest government contractors as they face a quickly evolving market fraught with uncertainty and opportunity as government agencies deal with tight budgets and a lame duck administration.
