= Carahsoft =

U.S. information technology company

Carahsoft Technology Corp.
- Founded: 2004
- Headquarters: Reston, Virginia, U.S.
- Key people: Craig P. Abod (CEO) & (President)
- Website: carahsoft.com

Carahsoft is an American technology solutions provider that sells hardware, software, and consulting services to United States federal, state, and local governments, as well as educational institutions. Founded in 2004, it is privately held and headquartered in Reston, Virginia, US.

== Operations ==
Carahsoft sells IT hardware, software and consulting services related to data analysis and storage, cyber defense and security, business intelligence, and other corporate and government functions.

Author Mark Amtower categorized Carahsoft as a “boutique reseller” because the company “sells a limited number of products, usually those that address a specific need in the market.” The company supports more than 3,000 prime contractors, value-added re-sellers, system integrators and other channel partners.

The company operates the Carahsoft Conference & Collaboration Center, a facility used for government and industry events.

== Contracts ==
=== U.S. Department of Defense ===
The U.S. Department of Defense is one of Carahsoft's largest customers.

The DoD awarded an estimated $80,075,312 in contracts to Carahsoft in 2016, $270,475,338 in 2017, and $131,000,866 in 2018 as of June.

In 2019, The U.S. Navy included Carahsoft on a 10-year, $975 million blanket purchase agreement to provide SAP software products, a five-year $69.1 million BPA to provide Symantec software licenses, and a four-year $440 million BPA to provide McAfee hardware, software and services. Carahsoft was awarded a basic ordering agreement from the U.S Army to support a transition to cloud computing environments, for an estimated cost of $247.7 million. The DoD also included Carahsoft on an $820,450,000 BPA to supply information technology asset management software, software maintenance support, information technology professional services; and related services to the DoD, intelligence community and U.S. Coast Guard.

On April 2, 2020, Naval Information Warfare Systems Command contracted Carahsoft for a variety of BlackBerry services. On May 22, 2020, the U.S. Air Force awarded Carahsoft an $81 million contract to help the Space Command and Control Division within Space & Missile Systems Center (Los Angeles Air Force Base) create and implement software development and information technology operations. On July 16, 2020, Carahsoft was awarded roughly $29.8 million to work at Fort Belvoir, moving an Army logistics modernization program to the cloud. On July 27, 2020, the U.S. Army awarded Carahsoft a $16 million contract to support the Army Enterprise Systems Integration Program and Global Combat Support System. On August 31, the DoD included Carahsoft in a 10-year, $13 billion firm-fixed-price contract with 30 other tech companies to supply off-the-shelf enterprise infrastructure software and maintenance to the U.S. Army, Department of Defense and all federal agencies.

In March 2026, the Defense Information Systems Agency entered into a 5-year $970 million blanket purchase agreement for Broadcom software, with a focus on the VMware Cloud Foundation platform.

=== U.S. General Services Administration ===
In 2018, Carahsoft was one of two teams selected by the U.S. GSA as part of a 10-year, $2.5 billion blanket purchase agreement to provide Software-as-a-Service (SaaS) applications for payroll, work schedule and leave management.

In 2019, Carahsoft was one of 11 teams selected by the U.S. GSA and National Geospatial-Intelligence Agency (NGA) as part of a blanket purchase agreement (BPA) to provide geospatial earth observation data, products and services. Carahsoft and Grant Thornton were given multi-million dollar task orders as part of a blanket purchase agreement related to NewPay, a U.S. General Services Administration initiative to modernize federal payroll IT and services.

=== U.S. Immigration and Customs Enforcement ===
In 2025, The Lever reported that US Immigration and Customs Enforcement had signed a five-year, $5.7-million contract with Carahsoft to license Zignal Labs' social media surveillance software to provide "real-time data analysis for criminal investigations." The Surveillance Technology Oversight Project (STOP) described the deal as an assault on democracy and free speech.

== Overcharging allegations ==
In 2010 a lawsuit was filed against Carahsoft and VMware for allegedly overcharging government customers. The firms settled the case with the United States Department of Justice for $75.5m while denying wrongdoing.

In 2023, the US Government filed a case to determine “whether Carahsoft conspired with other companies to rig bids, inflate prices, overcharge, and defraud the Department of Defense (DoD), among other federal government agencies” when it resold products. On September 24, 2024, the US Federal Bureau of Investigation and the Defense Criminal Investigative Service launched a joint raid at the Carahsoft headquarters in Reston, Virginia.
