= Health Net =

American health care insurance provider

Health Net, LLC
- Trade name: Health Net
- Type: Subsidiary
- Industry: Managed health care
- Founded: 1979; 47 years ago
- Headquarters: Woodland Hills, Los Angeles, California
- Key people: J. Brian Ternan (CEO)
- Products: Health insurance
- Number of employees: 3,000
- Parent: Centene
- Website: www.healthnet.com

Health Net, LLC a subsidiary of Centene, is an American health care insurance provider. Health Net and its subsidiaries provide health plans for individuals, families, businesses and people with Medicare and Medicaid, as well as commercial, small business, and affordable care insurance.

In 2016, Centene acquired Health Net for $6.8 billion.

== History ==
Health Net was established as the nonprofit Health Net of California in 1977 by Blue Cross. In 1992, a California order permitted the company to convert from a nonprofit to a for-profit company. Under the terms of the California Department of Corporations' conversion order, the California Wellness Foundation, the successor charity to its nonprofit status, received $300 million plus 80 percent of the equity of Health Net's parent holding company.

In August 1993, Health Net merged with Qualmed to form Health Systems International. In April 1997, Health Systems International merged with Foundation Health Corporation to form Foundation Health Systems. Also in 1997, Foundation Health Systems acquired PACC Health Plans and Physicians Health Services.

In November 2000, Foundation Health Systems changed its name to Health Net, Inc. when the company started trading on the New York Stock Exchange under the symbol HNT.

In July 2009, UnitedHealth Group bought Health Net's northeastern licensed subsidiaries for $510 million, and its Medicare and Medicaid businesses for $60 million. In November 2009, Connecticut's attorney general office investigated a lost, unencrypted hard drive with customer data. Health Net offered two years of free credit protection from a company called Debix to affected customers.

In November 2010, the Centers for Medicare and Medicaid Services (CMS) suspended Health Net for marketing and enrolling new members for compliance issues. The sanctions were lifted in August 2011. In January 2012, the company agreed to sell its Medicare Prescription Drug Plan (PDP) business to CVS Caremark Corp. (CVS) for approximately $160 million in cash. Health Net continued to providing prescription drug plans as part of its Medicare Advantage plans.

=== Mergers and Acquisitions ===
On July 2, 2015, Centene Corporation announced it would acquire Health Net for $6.8 billion. The acquisition was completed in March 2016 and combined headquarters were established in St. Louis, Missouri. The acquisition resulted in Health Net Federal Services (HNFS) becoming a separate subsidiary of Centene.

In 2018, Health Net in Arizona was merged into other Centene holdings to form Arizona Complete Health, and Martha Smith was named as its Plan President and CEO. Separately, in September 2019, Brian Ternan was appointed CEO of Health Net in California, leading operations in that state.

== Legal cases ==
In 2007, a California patient sued Health Net claiming that the company wrongfully terminated her care during chemotherapy treatments. During the case, a company employee performance review revealed that a manager had tied bonuses for an analyst in charge of rescission reviews to the rate of enrollees whose coverage was discontinued. Health Net claimed that the patient withheld health information, including a heart problem, that would have disqualified her from coverage. She replied that the insurance broker had filled out the form for her. In February 2008, the court ruled in Bates' favor and ordered Health Net to over $9 million in damages.

In 2008, Health Net agreed to pay $215M to settle allegations that it had unfairly reimbursed out-of-network providers between 1995 and 2007.

In September 2012, the Los Angeles County Medical Association and two patients sued Health Net for denying medically necessary treatment, including cancer care. The lawsuit alleged that Health Net denied claims based on its own definition of "medical necessity" rather than standards set forth by California law. A judge ruled in Health Net's favor in July 2013.

In 2016, Health Net Federal Services became a wholly owned subsidiary of Centene, ending its time as a publicly traded company. In 2021, Health Net's former subsidiary, Health Net Federal Services, agreed to pay $97M to settle allegations that it had duplicated or inflated claims submitted to the Department of Veterans Affairs between 2013 and 2019.

== See also ==
- Top 100 US Federal Contractors
