= VSE Corporation =

American diversified services company

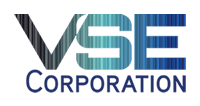
- Company type: Public
- Traded as: Nasdaq: VSEC; Russell 2000 component; S&P 600 component
- Industry: Technical services
- Predecessor: Value Services Engineering Company
- Founded: 1959, Virginia
- Headquarters: Alexandria, Virginia, United States
- Area served: Worldwide
- Key people: John A. Cuomo
- Services: Supply chain management Maintenance, repair, and overhaul (MRO); Logistics; Engineering; Energy services Consulting services
- Revenue: ▲$752.6 (2019); $697.2 (2018); $760.1 million (2017)
- Net income: ▲$37.0 (2019); $35.1 million (2018); $39.1 million (2017)
- Number of employees: 2,775 (2019
- Website: vsecorp.com

VSE Corporation is a leading provider of aftermarket distribution and repair services. Operating through its two key segments, VSE significantly enhances the productivity and longevity of its customers' high-value, business-critical assets. The aviation segment is a leading provider of aftermarket parts distribution and maintenance, repair, and overhaul (MRO) services for components and engine accessories to commercial, business, and general aviation operators. The fleet segment specializes in part distribution, engineering solutions, and supply chain management services catered to the medium and heavy-duty fleet market.

== Business units (sectors) ==
VSE was incorporated in Delaware in 1959 and the parent company serves as a centralized managing and consolidating entity for three operating groups, each of which consists of one or more wholly owned subsidiaries or unincorporated divisions. VSE's operating segments include:

- Aviation Distribution & Repair
  - VSE Aviation Services, including the former:
    - 1st Choice Aerospace
    - Kansas Aviation
    - GlobalParts Aero Services
    - Precision Fuel Components
  - VSE Aviation Distribution, including the former:
    - Air Parts & Supply Co "APSCO"
    - GlobalParts.aero
- Wheeler Fleet Solutions

== Company segments ==
=== Aviation distribution and repair ===
VSE's aviation segment provides aftermarket repair and distribution services to commercial, cargo, business and general aviation, military/defense and rotorcraft customers globally. Core services include parts distribution, component and engine accessory maintenance, repair and overhaul (MRO) services, rotable exchange, and supply chain services.

=== Fleet services ===
VSE's fleet segment provides parts, inventory management, e-commerce fulfillment, logistics, supply chain support and other services to support the commercial aftermarket medium- and heavy-duty truck market, the United States Postal Service (USPS), and the United States Department of Defense. Core services include parts distribution, sourcing, IT solutions, customized fleet logistics, warehousing, kitting, just-in-time supply chain management, alternative product sourcing, engineering and technical support.

== History ==
VSE Corporation was established in 1959 to provide engineering and technical services to the owners and operators of transportation and equipment assets and large, mission critical fleets (ships, vehicles and aircraft.)

VSE is a publicly traded (NASDAQ: VSEC), ISO 9001:2015-registered SCM, MRO, and professional services company. VSE's subsidiary, Wheeler Fleet Solutions received its seventh U.S. Postal Service Supplier Performance Award for 2013. VSE Aviation, Inc. is an FAA and EASA certified independent provider of MRO and SCM services for aircraft engines and engine accessories.
