= Vectrus =

American defense contractor

Vectrus V2X
- Industry: Defense contractor
- Predecessor: Exelis Inc.
- Founded: 2014
- Headquarters: Colorado Springs, Colorado
- Website: https://gov2x.com/

Vectrus, also known as V2X, is an American defense contractor. They are one of the largest federal contractors.

== Overview ==
Vectrus is a defense contractor based in Colorado Springs, Colorado. Vectrus is publicly traded and is listed on the New York Stock Exchange.

== History ==
Vectrus was spun off from Exelis Inc. in 2014. Exelis itself was spun off from ITT Corp. in 2011.

In 2019, they won a $1.38 billion US Army contract to provide logistical service in the Middle East and Asia.

Vectrus merged with Vertex Aerospace Services Holding Corp. in July 2022, and became V2X.

== Leadership ==
Jeremy C. Wensinger is the president and chief executive officer of V2X (Vectrus).
