= UT–Battelle =

American research company

UT–Battelle, LLC is a nonprofit limited liability company (LLC) organized under the laws of Tennessee. Its members consist of the University of Tennessee and Battelle Memorial Institute. UT–Battelle administers, manages, and operates Oak Ridge National Laboratory (ORNL), which is sponsored by the U.S. Department of Energy (DOE). It does so as a federally funded research and development center (FFRDC) under a contract with the DOE.

UT–Battelle first assumed its responsibilities for ORNL in April 2000, after winning a competitive procurement process. After the conclusion of the initial five-year contract with the DOE, the contract was renewed for a second five-year period, extending through 2010. The contract was subsequently renewed in 2010, 2015, 2020, and 2025, each time for a five-year period. DOE's prime contract with UT-Battelle can be viewed at https://primecontract.ornl.gov/.

== See also ==
- Top 100 US Federal Contractors
