= Oak Ridge Historic District =

Historic district in Tennessee, United States

- U.S. National Register of Historic Places
- U.S. Historic district
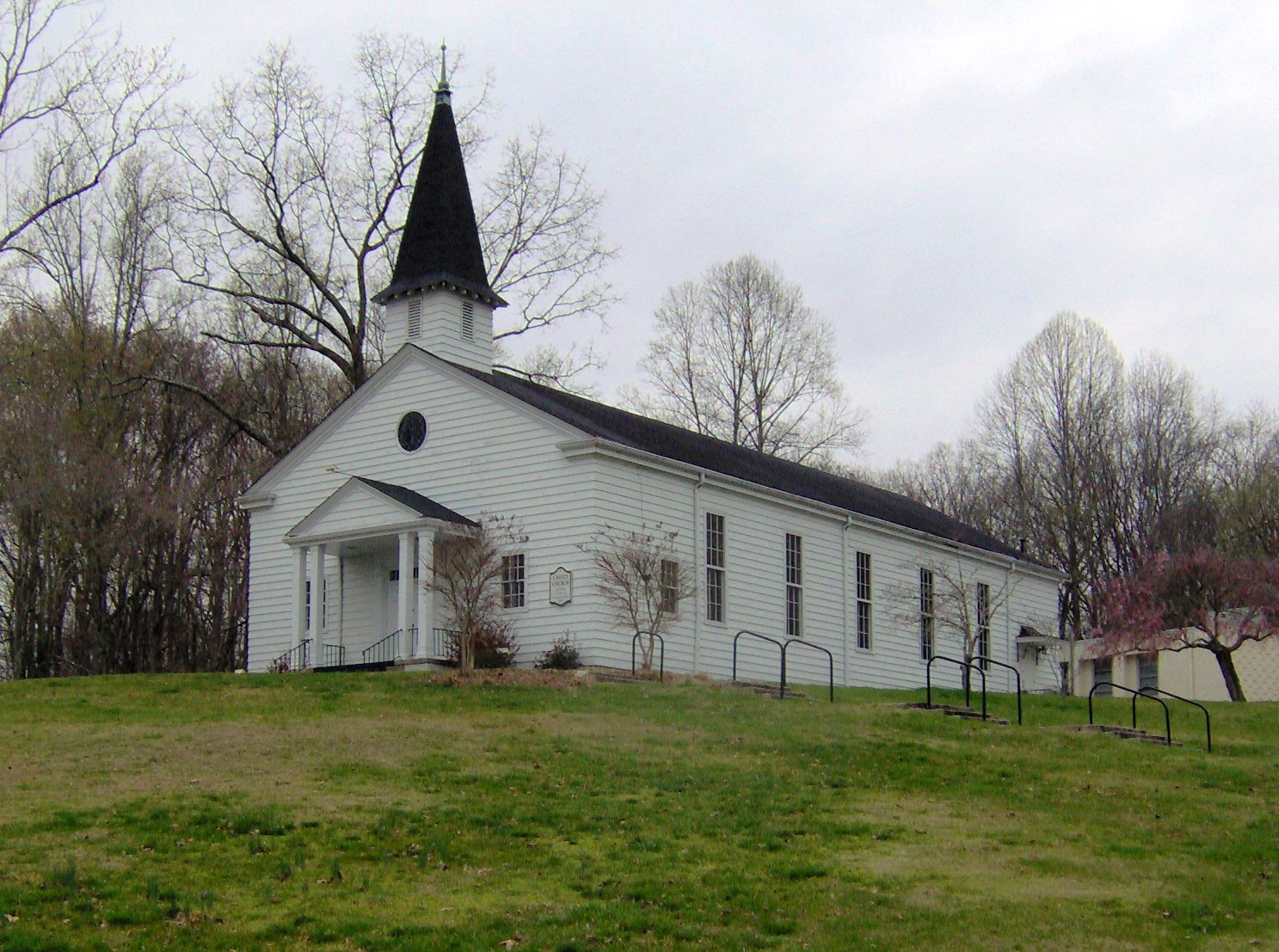
- The Chapel on the Hill

- Location within Tennessee Location within the United States
- Location: Roughly bounded by East Dr., W. Outer Dr., Louisiana and Tennessee Aves., Oak Ridge, Tennessee
- Coordinates: 36°1′41″N 84°15′10″W
- Area: 3,500 acres (1,400 ha)
- Built: 1942
- Architect: Skidmore, Owings,& Merrill; Et al.
- MPS: Oak Ridge MPS
- NRHP reference No.: 91001109
- Added to NRHP: September 05, 1991

Oak Ridge Historic District (also known as Clinton Engineer Works Townsite) is a historic district in Oak Ridge, Tennessee, that is listed on the National Register of Historic Places.

Roughly bounded by East Drive, Outer and West Outer Drives, Louisiana Avenue, and Tennessee Avenue, the district comprises much of Oak Ridge's original Manhattan Project townsite, laid out by Skidmore, Owings and Merrill.

Contributing properties in the historic district include United Church, The Chapel on the Hill, the Alexander Inn, and Highland View Elementary School, which houses the Children's Museum of Oak Ridge. The district was added to the National Register in 1991.
