= United Church, The Chapel on the Hill =

Historic church in Tennessee, United States

- U.S. Historic district – Contributing property
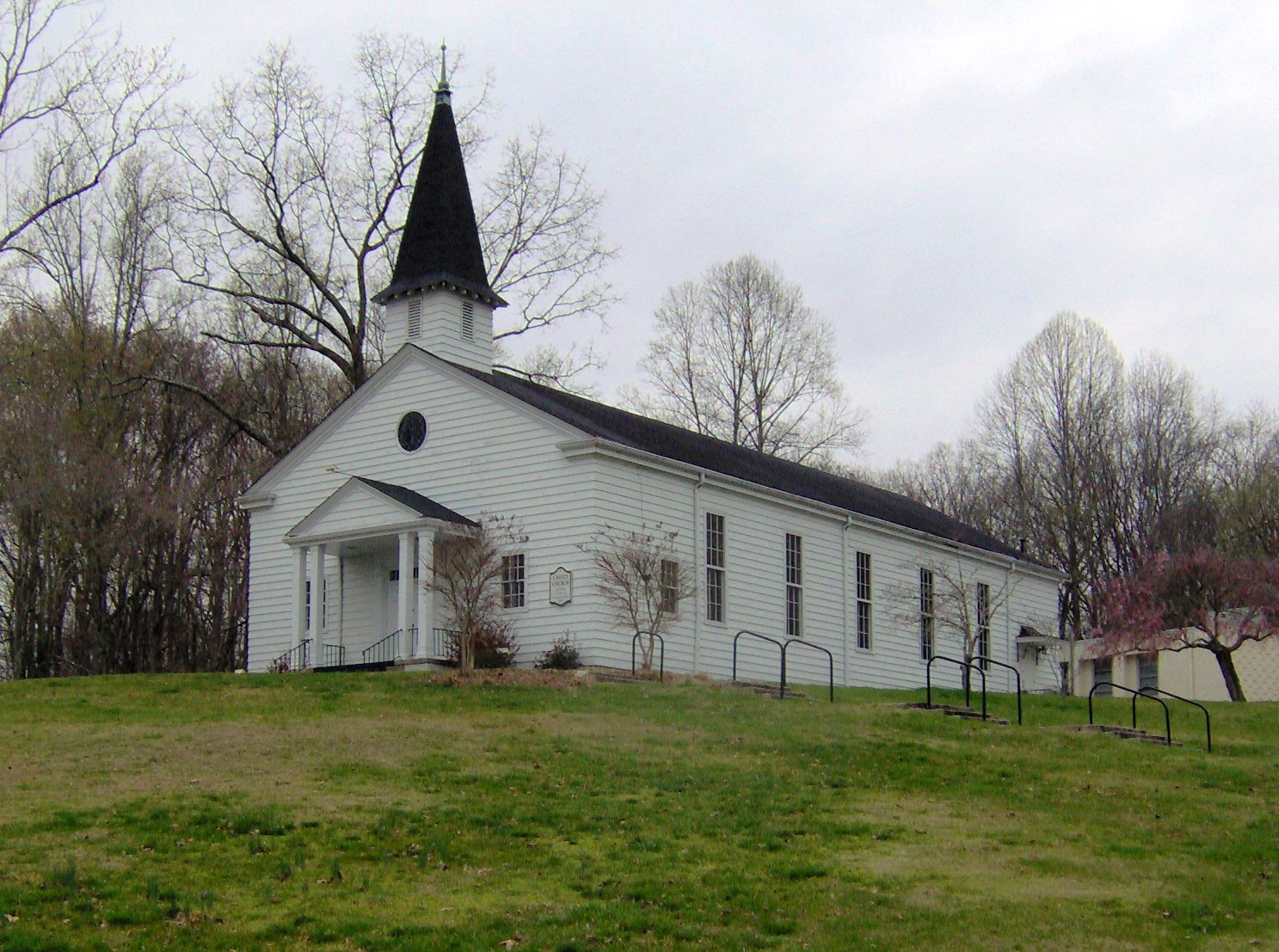
- The Chapel on the Hill

- Location within Tennessee Location within the United States
- Location: Oak Ridge, Tennessee
- Coordinates: 36.03046°N 84.24226°W
- Area: 700-series U.S. Army chapel
- Built: 1943
- Architect: U.S. Army Corps of Engineers
- Part of: Oak Ridge Historic District (ID91001109)
- MPS: Oak Ridge MPS
- Designated CP: September 05, 1991

The United Church, Chapel on the Hill in Oak Ridge, Tennessee was the city's main church during World War II. Dedicated on September 30, 1943, and completed late in October 1943, it was originally a multi-denominational chapel shared by Catholic, Protestant and Jewish congregations.

== Architectural design ==
The building design is a U.S. Army Corps of Engineers 700-series U.S. Army chapel. It is a frame building built on a three-bay rectangular plan with a steepled bell tower and a gable entry porch. It was one of three Army chapels built using the same design in Oak Ridge during World War II. One of the other two chapels, the West Chapel in the city's West Village area, was later torn down, but the East Chapel in the East Village is still in use.

== History ==
The U.S. Army built the chapel to house religious activities, as one of numerous community facilities in the "townsite" area of Oak Ridge. The building was dedicated on September 30, 1943, in a ceremony that included prayers and talks by a Jewish rabbi, a Catholic priest, an Episcopal priest, a Baptist minister, and the minister who was serving the United Church congregation that eventually came to own the chapel. Its name, "The Chapel on the Hill," comes from a reference in a prayer by the Knoxville Baptist minister who participated in the dedication.

The United Church congregation that is housed in the Chapel on the Hill traces its history to July 18, 1943, when some 25 to 30 Christians of diverse denominational backgrounds gathered for Sunday worship in Oak Ridge's main cafeteria. Subsequently, several members of the group made plans to establish an interdenominational Protestant church, led by laypersons, to include all denominations. A Presbyterian minister working in Knoxville was engaged to conduct weekly services, and about 150 people representing 13 Protestant denominations became charter members of "the United Church". Governing boards of laypersons elected to lead the new congregation took up their duties on October 24, 1943.

When the Chapel-on-the-Hill was completed that same month, the United Church and the local Roman Catholic Church were given control of the building, as the only two churches then officially operating in the Manhattan Project community. During the war, when Oak Ridge's Manhattan Project facilities were operating around the clock, the chapel building was also in use nearly 24 hours a day as a venue for worship services, weddings, and other occasions for local workers of various Protestant, Catholic, and Jewish religious backgrounds.

At the peak of wartime activity in Oak Ridge, when the population exceeded 70,000, the United Church employed four ministers and conducted worship services in the Chapel on the Hill, East Village Chapel, and the Jefferson Theater, as well as Sunday school classes in several local schools and a trailer camp. By 1951, the United Church Chapel-on-the-Hill consolidated as a single interdenominational congregation, making its home in the Chapel on the Hill building.

The United Church congregation purchased the chapel and 3.72 acres (1.51 ha) of land from the U.S. Atomic Energy Commission on May 11, 1955, for a price of $17,116. An adjoining educational building was added in 1956–1957. The facility continues to operate as a nondenominational Protestant church under lay leadership, employing ministers with backgrounds in mainstream Protestant denominations. Since 2007 it has been affiliated with the Center for Progressive Christianity. The church's motto is "Where People from All Denominations Meet in Their Differences, but Are One in Their Search for God."

The Chapel-on-the-Hill was placed on the National Register of Historic Places in 1993 as a contributing property in the Oak Ridge Historic District.
