= Alexander Inn =

- The Alexander Inn
- U.S. Historic district – Contributing property
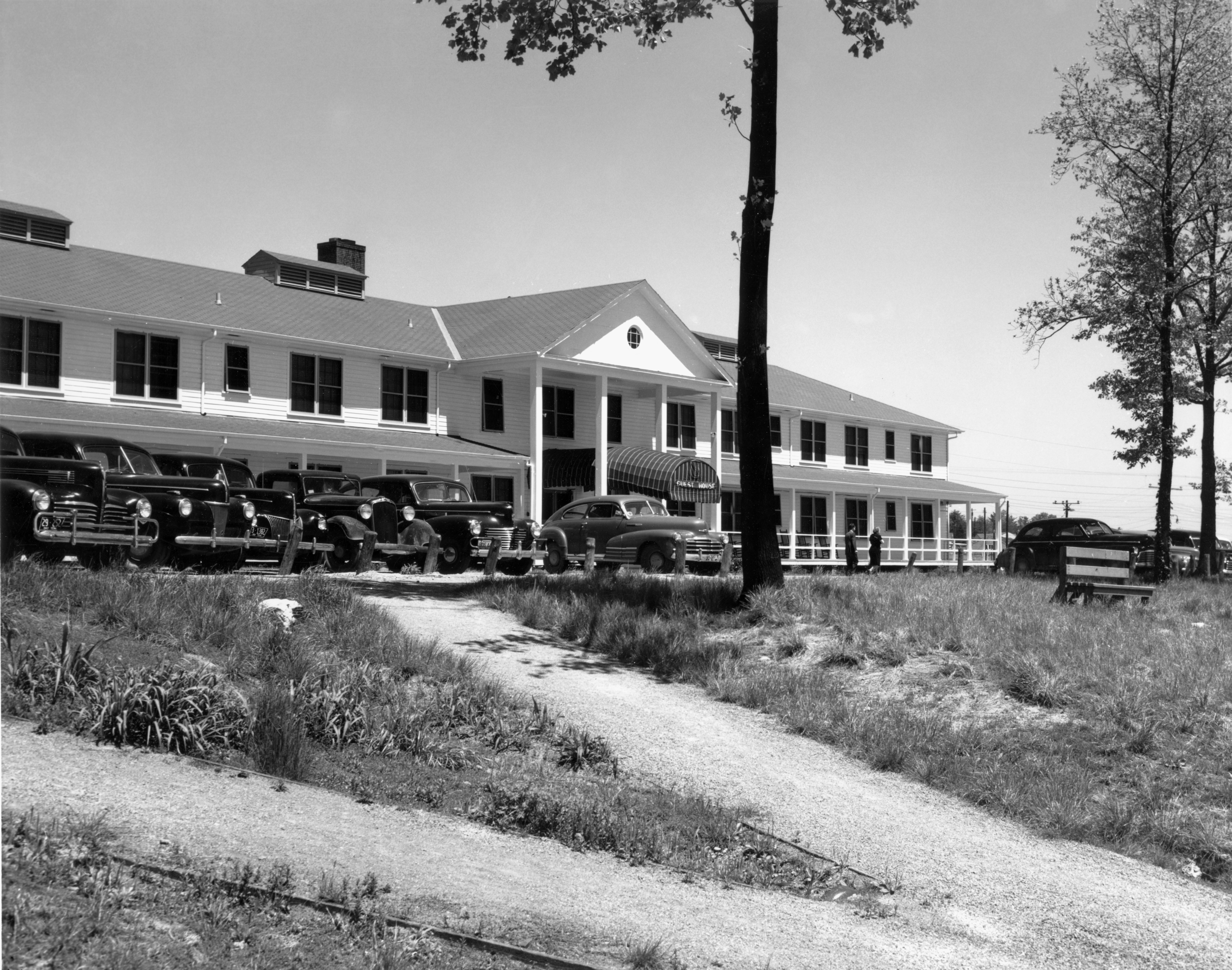

- Location within Tennessee Location within the United States
- Location: Oak Ridge, Tennessee
- Coordinates: 36.0289°N 84.2419°W
- Built: 1943
- Part of: Oak Ridge Historic District (ID91001109)
- Designated CP: September 05, 1991

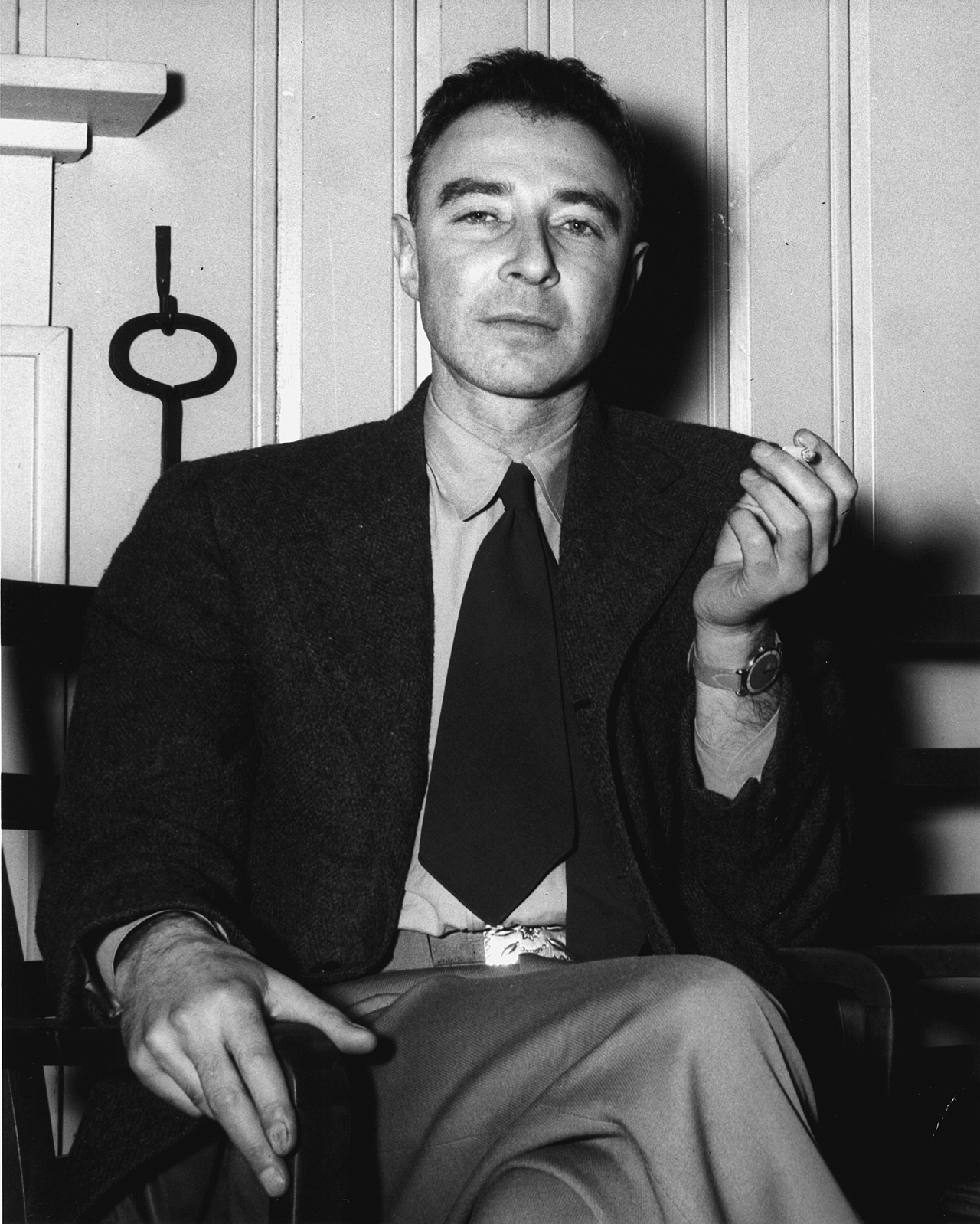
J. Robert Oppenheimer in the Guest House in 1946; photograph by Ed Westcott

The Alexander Inn, originally known as The Guest House and now the Alexander Guest House, is a historic building in Oak Ridge, Tennessee that was built during the Manhattan Project to house official visitors and that later was used as a hotel. It is included on the National Register of Historic Places as a contributing property in a historic district.

== History ==
The Guest House was built in 1943. A wood-framed building, similar to many other World War II period “H-plan” buildings, it served as guest quarters to a number of dignitaries during the top-secret Manhattan Project, including Enrico Fermi, Robert Oppenheimer and General Leslie Groves. In 1949, a 44-room addition was completed. The name was changed to the Alexander Inn in September 1950. The hotel was sold by the government to Mr. W. W. Faw for $34,000 in 1958. At that time, private bathrooms and a ballroom were added, and the kitchen was expanded.

The property was added to the National Register of Historic Places in 1991 as a contributing property in the Oak Ridge Historic District.

The Alexander Inn ceased operating as a hotel in the mid-1990s. Since that time the building had fallen into serious disrepair. On December 18, 2009, the Oak Ridge Revitalization Effort, a local nonprofit organization, announced that it had purchased the historic property. In March 2010, the East Tennessee Preservation Alliance listed the inn at the top of its first East Tennessee's Endangered Heritage list of endangered historic buildings and places in a 16-county region of East Tennessee. The previous, no-interest mortgage of $353,700 expired on June 30, 2011, after that date the property was to revert to its former owner. The Oak Ridge Heritage and Preservation Association (ORHPA), a group concerned with protecting the city's history, them began working with ORRE to develop a new non-profit organization that would focus entirely on restoring the Inn.

The Alexander was for a while on the endangered list by East Tennessee Preservation Alliance. The Oak Ridge Industrial Development Board endorsed, and the Oak Ridge City Council approved, a 90 percent, 10-year tax break for the project to convert the hotel into Senior Living by a private developer.

In November 2015 the building re-opened as a senior living center, after an $8 million renovation via Dover Development. The facility offers memory-care and assisted-living housing.

== In popular culture ==
The Alexander Inn and its grounds are central elements for the crime novel Bones of Betrayal by Jefferson Bass (the writing team of Jon Jefferson and Dr. William Bass), published in 2009 (ISBN 978-0-06-128474-8, ISBN 0-06-128474-2). The book mentioned a below-ground pool that had been left abandoned, filled with water and debris, and was a hazard. Shortly after the book was published, this pool, which did exist prior to the building's conversion into an assisted living center, was drained and filled in with dirt.
