= University of Tennessee Arboretum =

Arboretum in Oak Ridge, Tennessee, US

Coordinates: 35.9936°N 84.2210°W

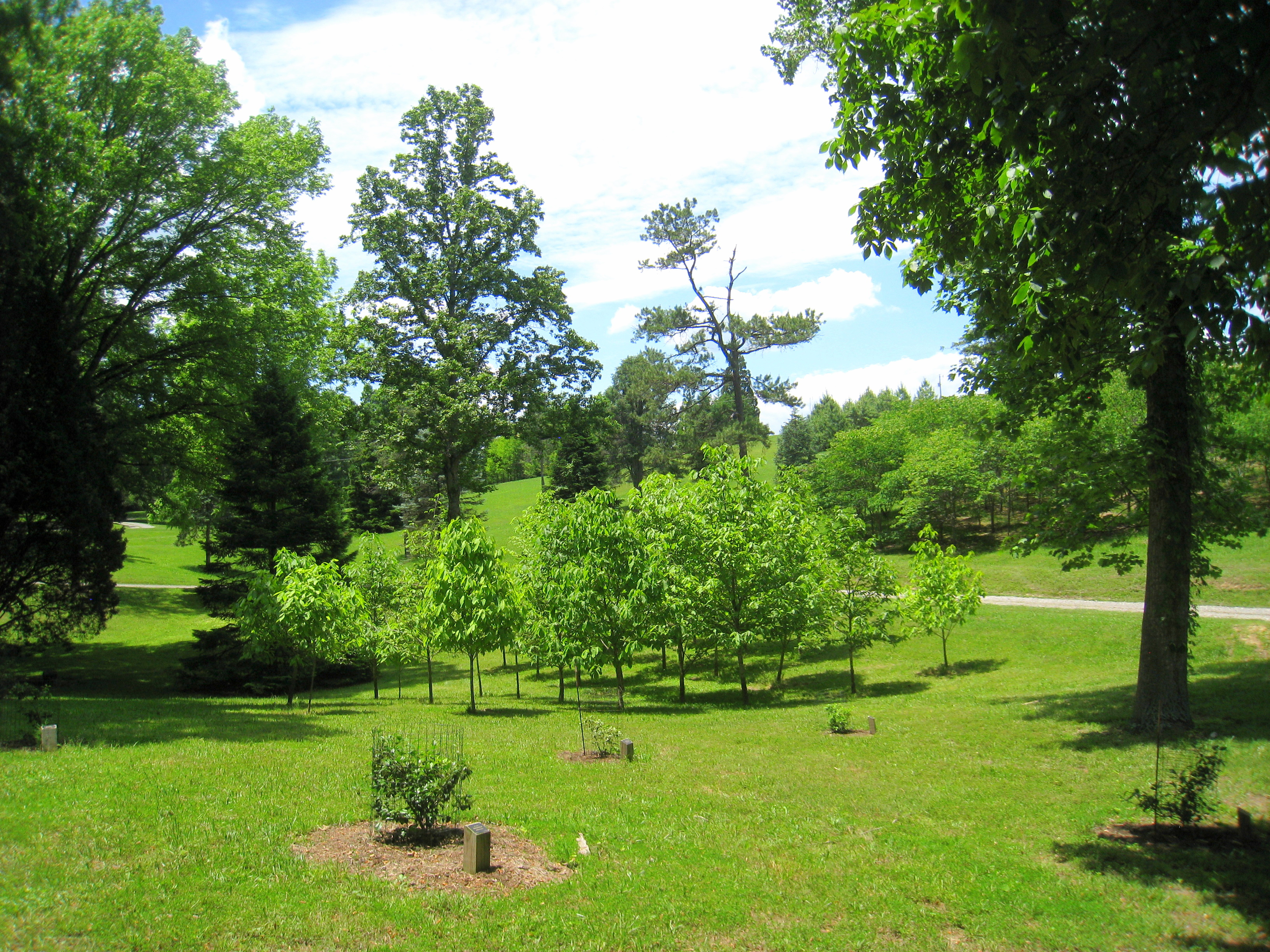
- Interactive map of University of Tennessee Arboretum
- Type: Arboretum
- Location: 901 South Illinois Avenue (State Highway 62), Oak Ridge, Tennessee
- Area: 250 acres (100 ha)
- Owner: University of Tennessee
- Visitors: 30,000 a year
- Open: Open to the public.
- Plants: 2,500
- Species: 800
- Website: utarboretum.tennessee.edu

The University of Tennessee Arboretum is a 250-acre (100 ha) research and educational arboretum operated by the University of Tennessee Agricultural Experiment Station. The arboretum is located at 901 South Illinois Avenue (State Highway 62), Oak Ridge, Tennessee and is open to the public without charge. Outdoor areas are open daily from 8:00 a.m. until sunset; the office and visitor center are open weekdays during normal office hours.

The arboretum contains approximately 2,500 native and exotic woody plant specimens, representing 800 species, varieties, and cultivars, with good collections of azaleas, conifers, crabapples, dogwoods, hollies, junipers, magnolias, oaks, rhododendrons, and viburnums. It also includes geographic groupings of plants from both relatively nearby habitats (Cumberland River gorge, Southern United States coastal plains) and elsewhere in the world (California, central China, and Poland), as well as four nature trails with interpretive signs.

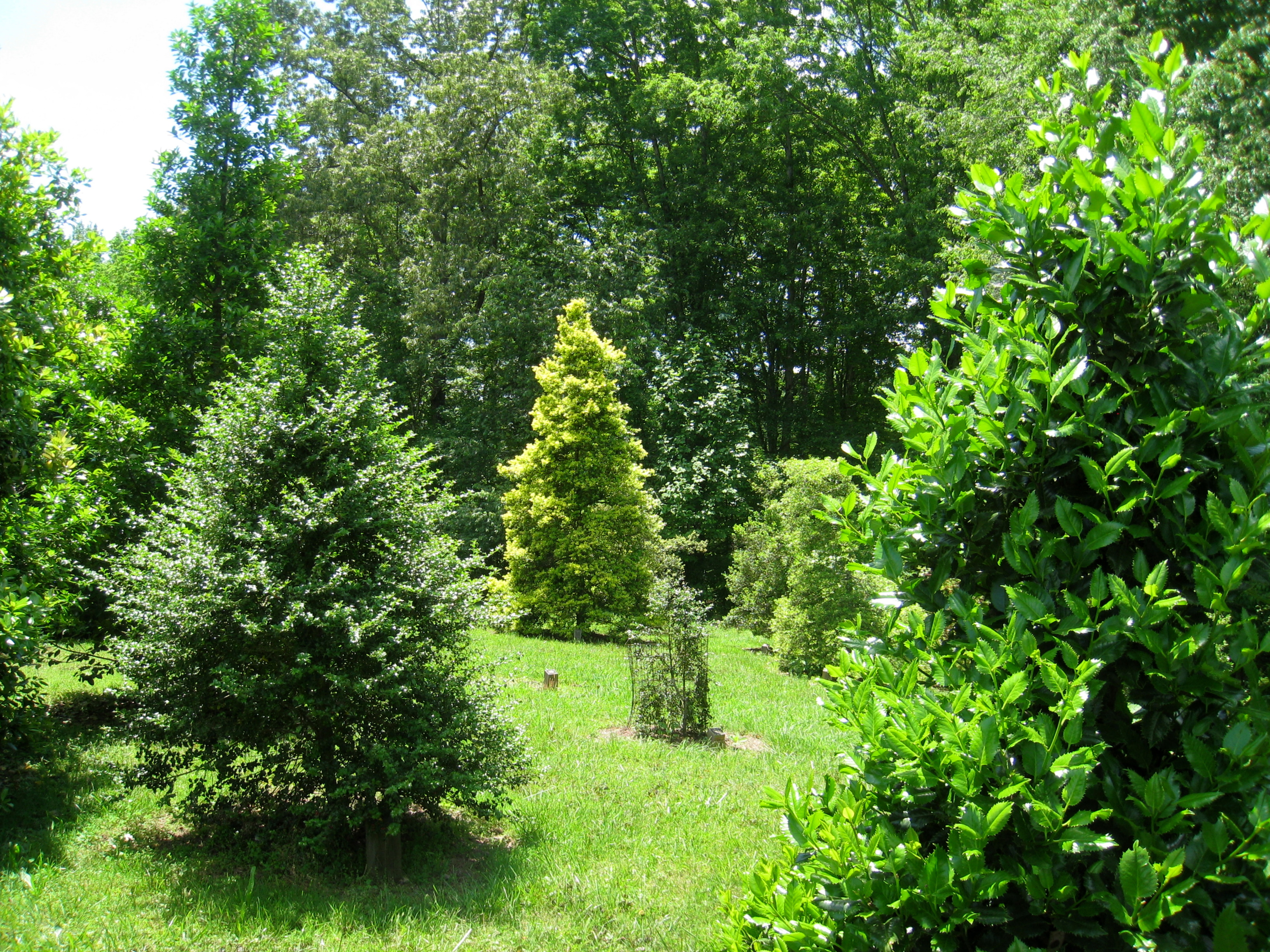
Elmore Holly Collection (detail)

== See also ==
- List of botanical gardens in the United States
