= Children's Museum of Oak Ridge =

Children's museum in Oak Ridge, Tennessee

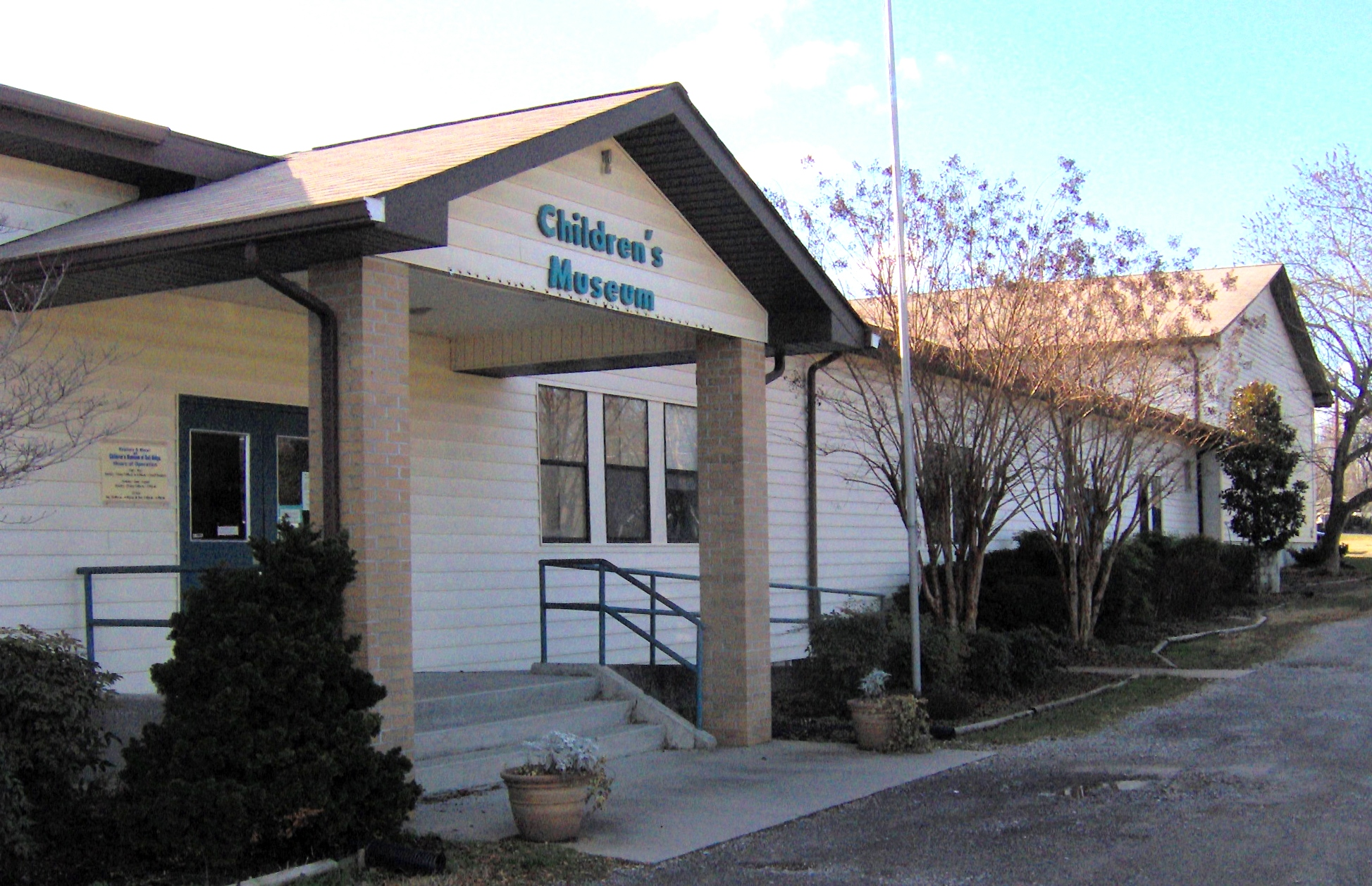
- Museum entrance
- Established: March 11, 1973; 53 years ago
- Location: 461 West Outer Drive; 37830 Oak Ridge, Tennessee; United States
- Coordinates: 36.022933°N 84.272202°W
- Type: Children's museum
- Collections: Toys; Educational programs Local Manhattan Project
- Collection size: 20,000
- Architects: Skidmore, Owings, and Merrill
- Owner: Oak Ridge Historic District
- Website: childrensmuseumofoakridge.org
- Highland View Elementary School
- U.S. Historic district – Contributing property
- Built: 1943
- Architect: U.S. Army Corps of Engineers
- Part of: Oak Ridge Historic District (ID91001109)
- MPS: Oak Ridge MPS
- Designated CP: September 05, 1991

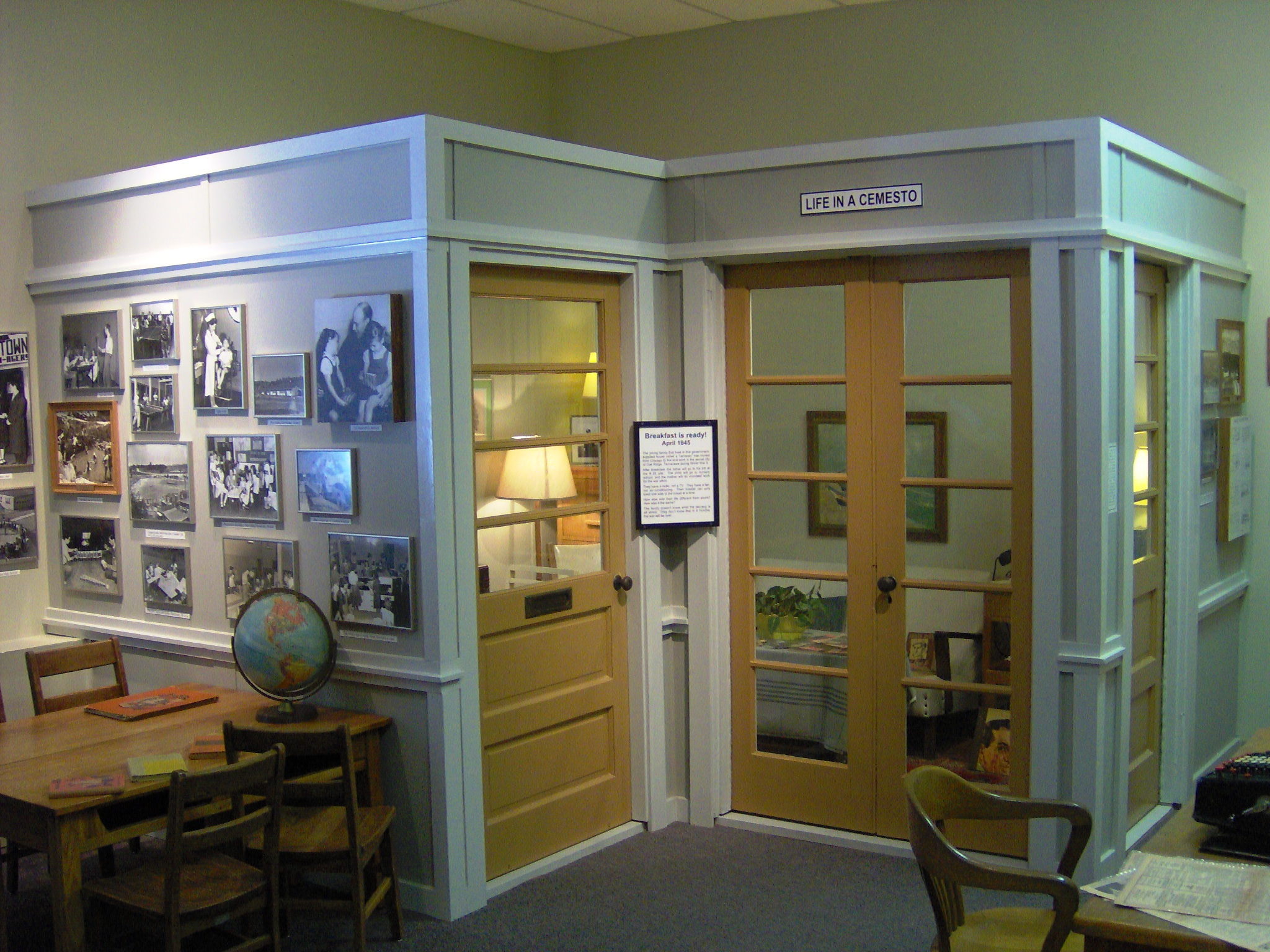
Children's Museum of Oak Ridge display depicting daily life in Oak Ridge during the Manhattan Project

The Children's Museum of Oak Ridge (abbreviated as CMOR) is a non-profit children's museum in Oak Ridge, Tennessee, United States, that provides museum exhibits and educational programs.

== History ==
The museum was first conceived as a Girl Scout project. With the support of a $500 grant from Reader's Digest, it opened on March 11, 1973, in the library of the former Jefferson Junior High School. In January 1974 it moved to the former Highland View Elementary School, where it is still located, with 54,000 square feet (5,000 m^{2}) of space for exhibits, classrooms, and special events. The museum purchased the building and land from the city of Oak Ridge in 1983.

Selma Shapiro was the director of the museum from shortly after its establishment in 1973 until 2004. After her retirement, she continued to serve as a volunteer until shortly before her death in 2011. In the early 1980s Shapiro was the first recipient of the Tennessee Arts Commission's Gordon Holl Arts Administrator Award. In 2005 the American Association of Museums named her to its Centennial Honor Roll, recognizing her as one of 100 American "museum champions" who had worked during the past century to innovate, improve and expand how museums in the United States serve the public.

During the period 1978 to 1982 the Children's Museum conducted a public education project known as "An Appalachian Experience," funded by a $376,000 grant from the National Endowment for the Humanities. The project resulted in the development of teaching materials on Appalachia and the 1982 publication of An Encyclopedia of East Tennessee, edited by James R. Stokely III and Jeff D. Johnson (ISBN 978-0960683208).

== Highland View Elementary School ==
The Highland View Elementary School that houses the museum was one of several elementary schools built in Oak Ridge to serve the children of Manhattan Project employees. It was completed in 1944 at a cost of $181,000. With 25 classrooms, it was intended to house up to 765 students. In 1993, when the Oak Ridge Historic District was listed on the National Register of Historic Places, the school building was included as a contributing property.

== Collections ==
Next to toys the museum also has several historical collections.

- Joyce Maienschein's large Girl Scout collection.
- Historical Oak Ridge newspapers.
- William G. Pollard collection, professor of physics and founder of Oak Ridge Associated Universities.
- Charles Vanden Bulck collection, the chief administrative officer for the Manhattan Project.
- Alvin M. Weinberg collection, nuclear physicist and administrator of Oak Ridge National Laboratory.
- Ed Westcott collection with photos and several of his cameras.
