= Ed Westcott =

American photographer (1922–2019)

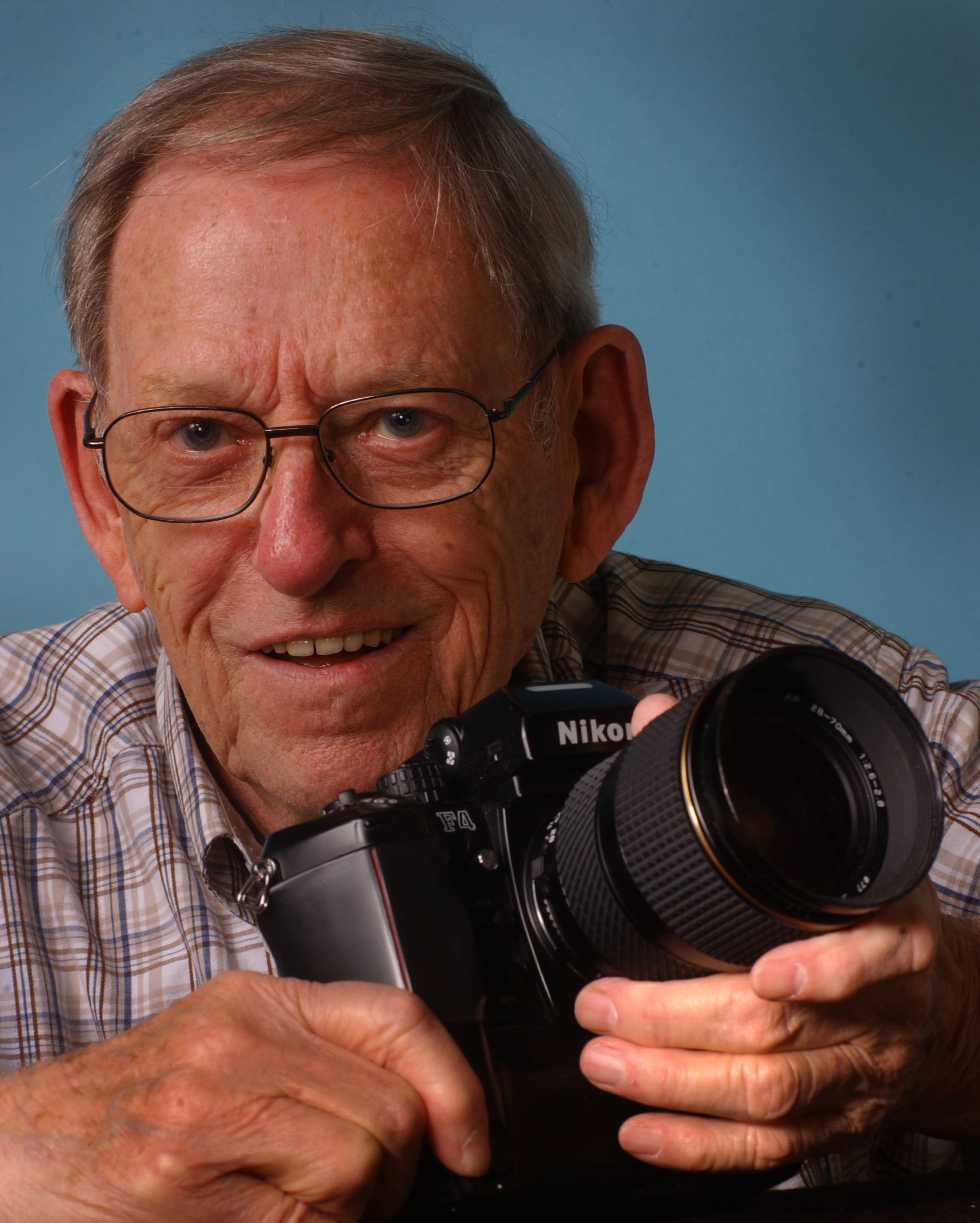
- Westcott in 2004
- Born: James Edward Westcott; January 20, 1922; Chattanooga, Tennessee, U.S.
- Died: March 29, 2019 (aged 97); Oak Ridge, Tennessee, U.S.
- Occupation: Photographer
- Known for: Manhattan Project photography

James Edward Westcott (January 20, 1922 – March 29, 2019) was an American photographer who was noted for his work with the United States government in Oak Ridge, Tennessee, during the Manhattan Project and the Cold War.

As one of the few people permitted to have a camera in the Oak Ridge area during the Manhattan Project, he created the main visual record of the construction and operation of the Oak Ridge production facilities and of civilian life in the enclosed community of Oak Ridge.

== Early life and career ==
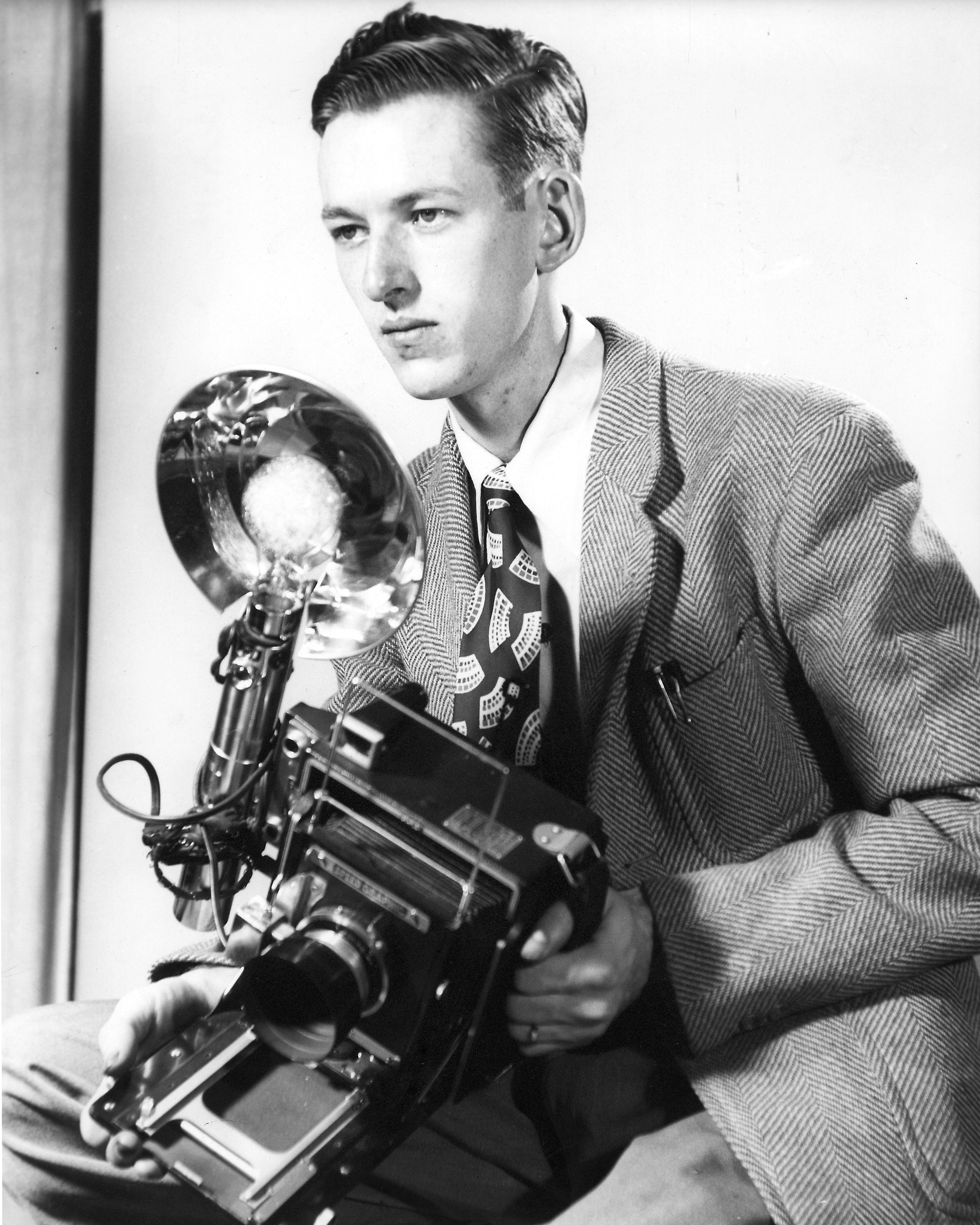
Westcott as a young man

Ed Westcott was born on January 20, 1922, in Chattanooga, Tennessee, the son of Jamie and Lucille Westcott, and moved to Nashville with his family as a child. After Ed expressed an interest in photography, his father saved for a year to buy him a Foth Derby camera that cost $25. The gift of that camera in the Depression year of 1934 started young Ed on the path to his future career. During his teenage years, he got into the business of developing film for friends and neighbors and worked in several Nashville portrait studios.

In 1941, he joined the U.S. Army Corps of Engineers, as a photographer in the Corps' Nashville District. His job for the Corps sent him around the region to create photographic documentation of several dams, a site in Tennessee that later became a prisoner-of-war camp, and the airport and other facilities at Fort Campbell on the Tennessee–Kentucky border.

== Photographer for the Manhattan Project and its aftermath ==
In December 1942, the Army Corps transferred the 20-year-old Westcott to the Clinton Engineer Works at the then-secret Oak Ridge site. He later recalled that:

By November 1942, work was nearing completion on army camps, air bases, dams and enemy internment camps in seven southern states where I photographed many areas for site selection and construction progress reports for the US Corps of Engineers. I was one of the last of the 10 cameramen to leave the Nashville District office of the Corps of Engineers and the only one to accept a transfer with the engineers. Having a choice of a project in Alaska or a new job starting near Knoxville that would take a predicted five years to complete, I selected Knoxville.

Westcott was the 29th employee hired for the Manhattan Project in Oak Ridge, where he was to work as an official government photographer from 1942 to 1966. During much of World War II he was employed by the Roane-Anderson Company, under contract to the Army Corps. As well as photographing the construction and mechanical workings of the X-10, K-25, Y-12, and S-50 production facilities, he photographed civilian activities in Oak Ridge for the community's Army-sponsored weekly newspaper, the Oak Ridge Journal. All of Westcott's wartime photos were produced with either a Speed Graphic or an 8×10 Deardorff view camera.

Some of his images were among the photos that were distributed to news media with the announcement of the first atomic bomb and the secret project that created it. In the weeks before the bombing of Hiroshima and Nagasaki in August 1945, prints of 18 of his photographs were made in secrecy in preparation for the announcement. The photographs were declassified and distributed as part of the press kit. He also processed film taken by the damage assessment teams in his laboratory in Oak Ridge. It took three days to print them; armed guards protected the darkroom.

In June 1945, Westcott became an Army employee again, and in the post-war years he transitioned to employment with the U.S. Atomic Energy Commission (AEC) after its formation in 1946. In 1966 he was assigned to the AEC headquarters near Washington, D.C., in Germantown, Maryland, where he worked for the AEC and its successor agencies (the Energy Research and Development Administration and Department of Energy) until retiring in 1977. He photographed nuclear power stations all over the United States.

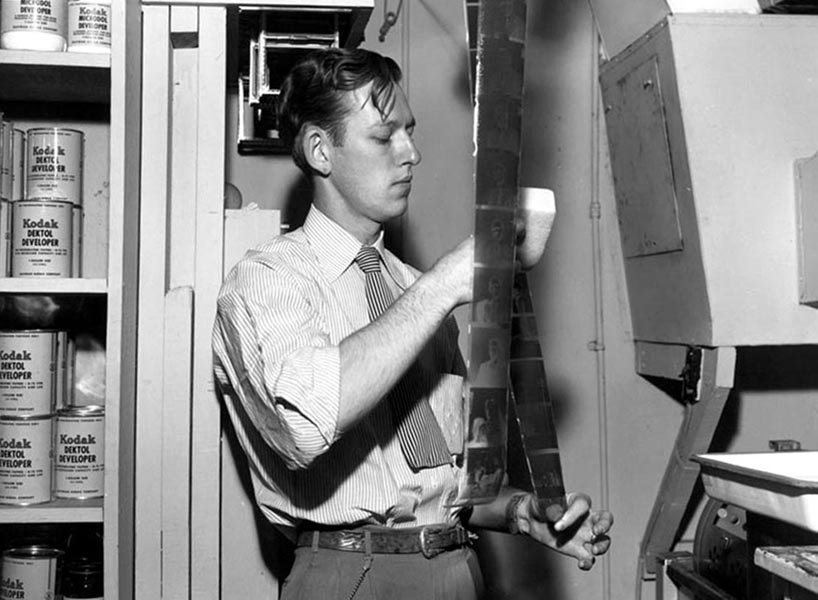
Westcott at work in the Clinton Engineer Works' darkroom in 1945

During Westcott's 35-year professional career, his assignments included creating photographic documentation of many notable people, including Manhattan Project scientists J. Robert Oppenheimer, Arthur Compton, Glenn Seaborg, Vannevar Bush, Ernest O. Lawrence, and James Bryant Conant, U.S. Army Generals Leslie Groves, Maxwell Taylor and Kenneth Nichols, Admiral Hyman Rickover, Secretary of War Robert P. Patterson, U.S. Senators Estes Kefauver and Kenneth McKellar of Tennessee and Robert A. Taft of Ohio, Tennessee Valley Authority director and AEC chairman David Lilienthal, and seven or eight U.S. Presidents.

Westcott's February 1946 photo portrait of Oppenheimer is highly regarded for depicting the Manhattan Project scientific director as a man weary from the tremendous weight of his experience. When he met with Oppenheimer, Westcott learned that the physicist wanted a cigarette but lacked the change to buy some. After Westcott gave him the money he needed, Oppenheimer bought his cigarettes and lit one. Westcott then captured the image of the physicist sitting next to a fireplace mantel in the Oak Ridge Guest House holding the freshly lighted cigarette in his hand.

In spite of the informality suggested by the cigarette, University of Tennessee photography professor Baldwin Lee points out that the photo was carefully planned and posed. According to Lee, Westcott instructed Oppenheimer to sit "slightly askance" and to lean forward slightly, and then he took the photograph from a low vantage point that "makes the viewer physically look up at the man", thus enhancing the subject's perceived importance. Lee's critique also notes that Oppenheimer's gaze does not appear to be directed anywhere in the room, but instead is aimed at "something very distant and something only he can see."

== Exhibits and publications ==
Much of Ed Westcott's photographic work was classified when it was first created, and some of it remained classified for many years, but access to his work is now largely unrestricted. About 5,000 negatives are archived by the National Archives in Washington, DC. His photographs have been widely reproduced, often without naming him as the photographer, in publications and exhibits about the Manhattan Project.

The first museum exhibition devoted to Westcott's work was organized by the Children's Museum of Oak Ridge in 1981, entitled "Oak Ridge Seen 1943–1947: 20 Photographs by Edward Westcott". In 2005, the Ewing Gallery of Art and Architecture at the University of Tennessee in Knoxville mounted an exhibition of his photos, entitled "Through the Lens of Ed Westcott: A Photographic History of World War II's Secret City". The American Museum of Science and Energy and the Children's Museum of Oak Ridge both have exhibits devoted to Westcott and his work, in addition to displaying his photos as part of exhibits on the city's history. A selection of works from the Ewing Gallery exhibit is now a touring museum exhibit.

A photograph of an Oak Ridge supermarket that Westcott created in 1945, "Tulip Town Market, Grove Centre", was featured by the National Archives as part of a 2005–2006 exhibit named "The Way We Worked". Collections of Westcott's Oak Ridge photographs have been published in the catalog to the Ewing Gallery exhibit (University of Tennessee, 2005; ISBN 0-9761663-1-3) and in the book Oak Ridge by Ed Westcott (Arcadia Publishing, 2005; ISBN 0-7385-4170-2, ISBN 978-0-7385-4170-9). A photo by Westcott of shift change at Y-12 during the Manhattan Project, blown up to 20 feet (6.1 m) by 50 feet (15 m), is displayed on the wall of the cafeteria at the Y-12 National Nuclear Security Complex.

== Personal life ==
Westcott resided in Oak Ridge. He was married to Esther Seigenthaler Westcott for 56 years before her death. They had five children. His grandson Phil works as a photographer in Alaska for the National Park Service, documenting the effects of global warming. In 2005, Westcott suffered a stroke that impaired his speech. The Oak Ridge Kroger Marketplace shopping center, which opened in 2014, is named the "Westcott Center" in his honor.

Westcott died on March 29, 2019, in Oak Ridge, at the age of 97.

== Gallery ==
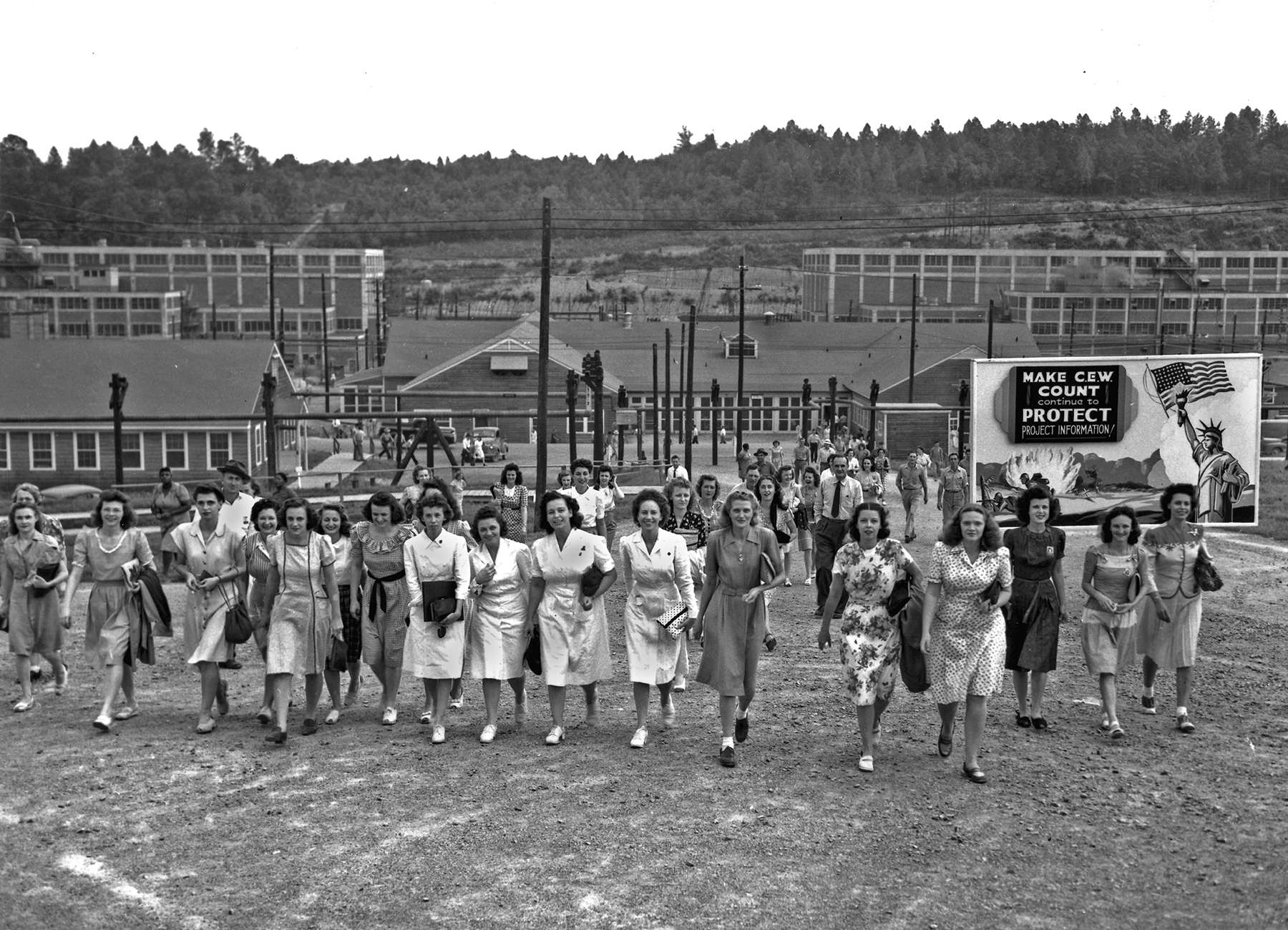
Shift change at the Y-12 during the Manhattan Project

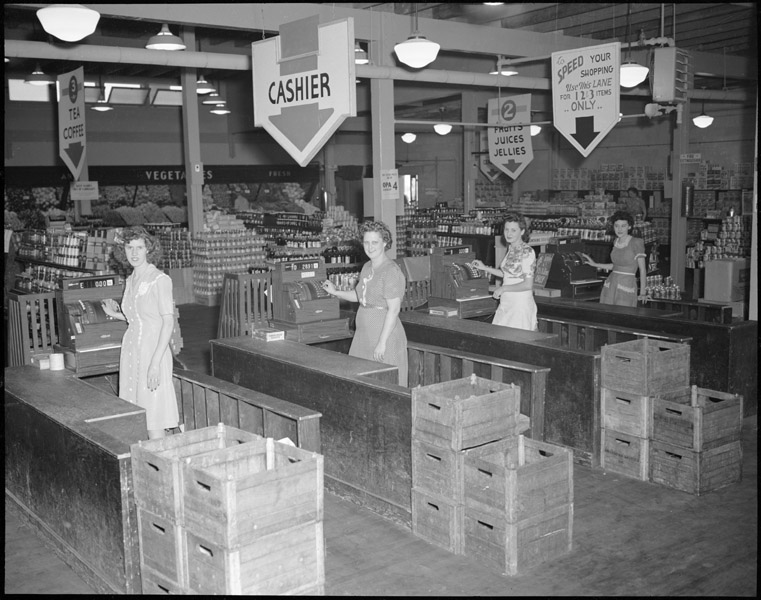
Oak Ridge supermarket. Exhibited by National Archives with the title "Tulip Town Market, Grove Center"

Calutron operators at the Y-12 plant in Oak Ridge. This photo motivated Denise Kiernan to write Girls of Atomic City.

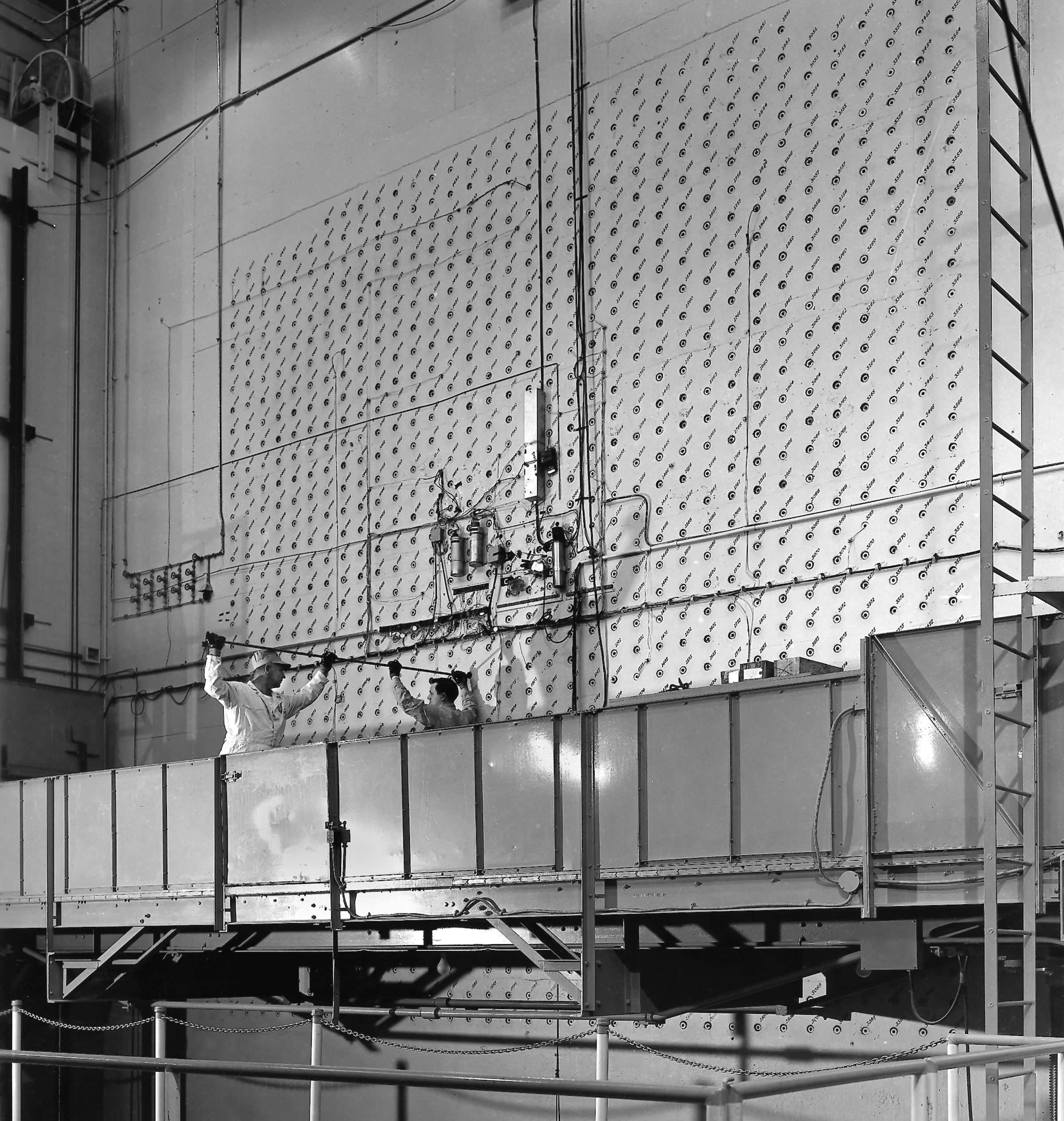
Workers load uranium slugs into the X-10 Graphite Reactor's concrete face.
