= Oak Ridge, Tennessee =

City in Tennessee, United States

- City
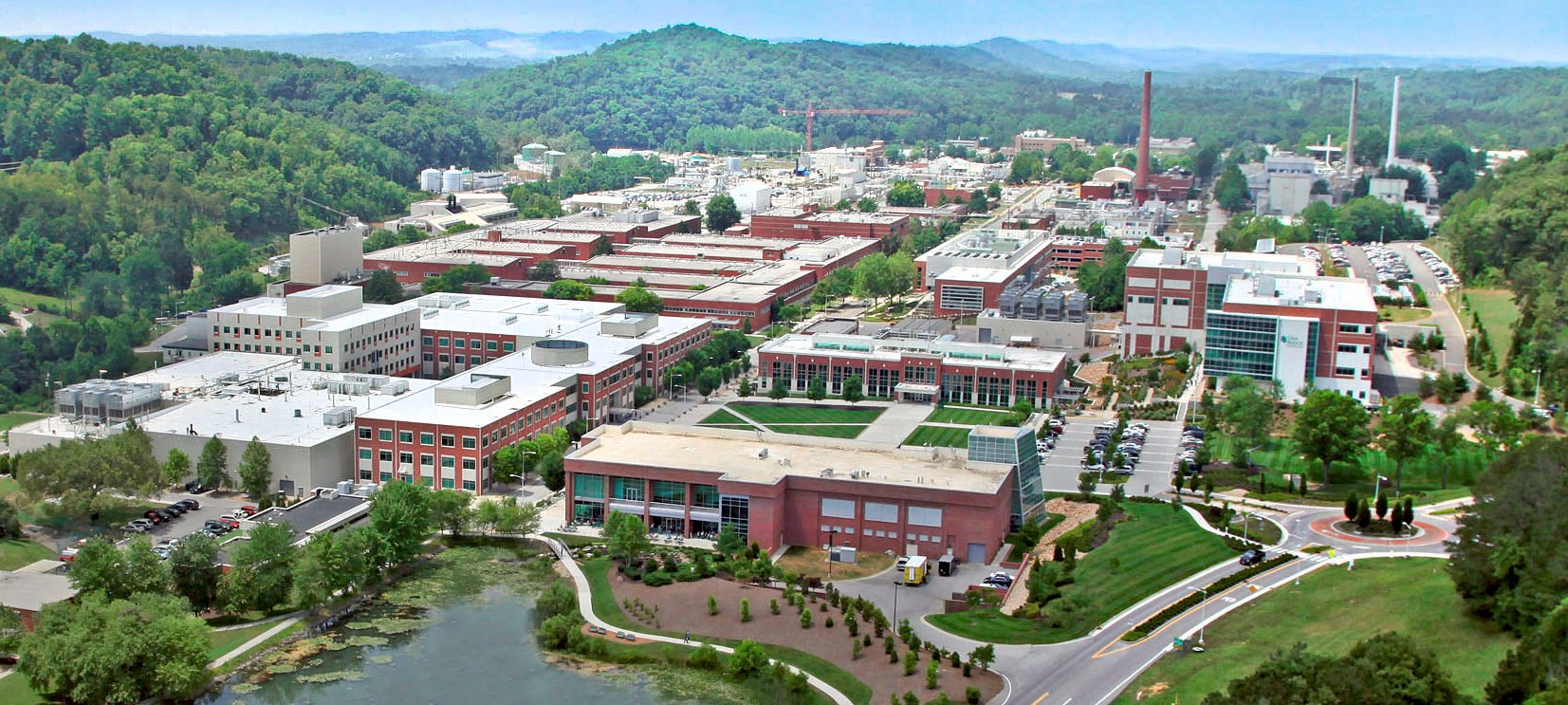
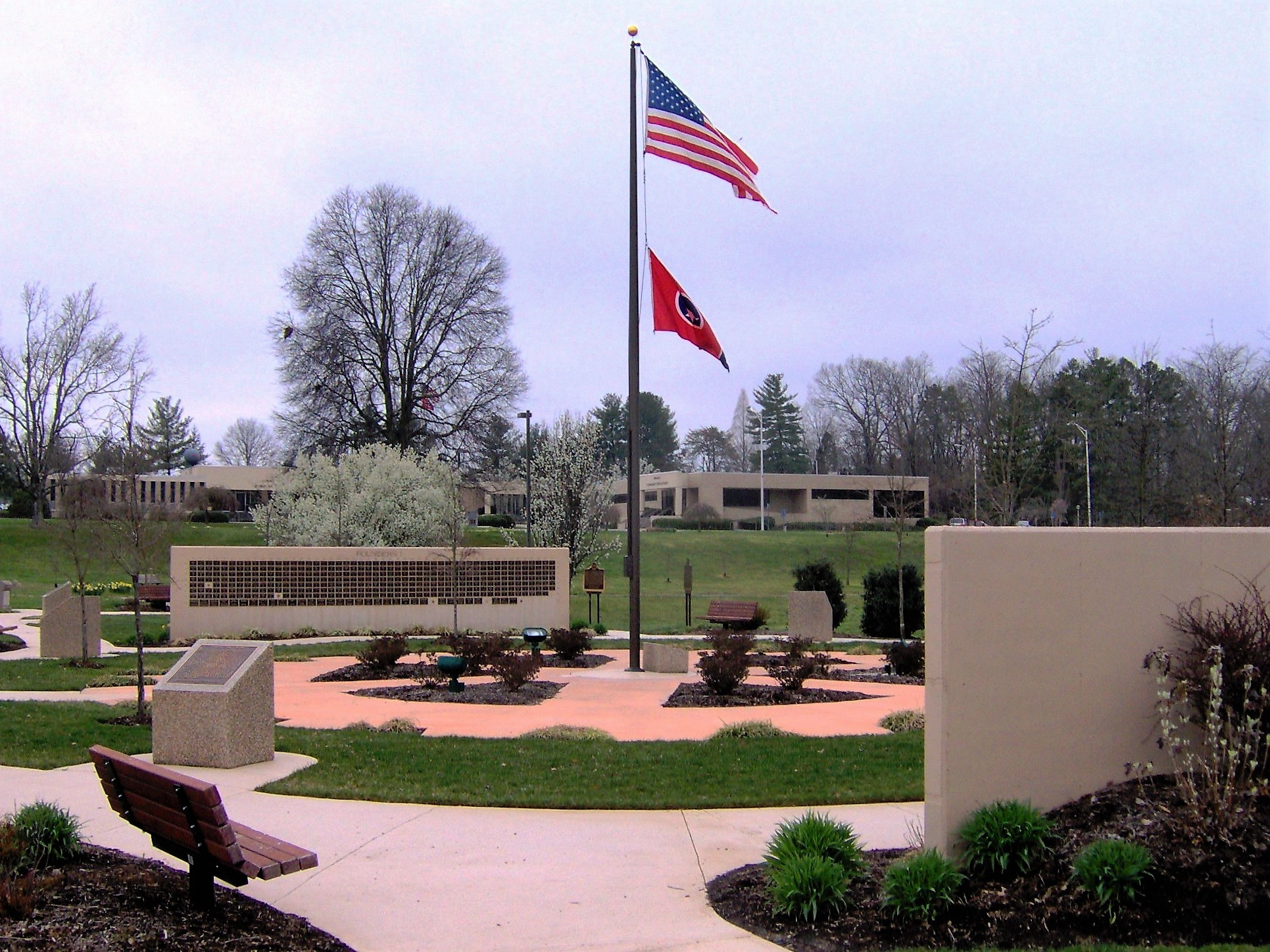
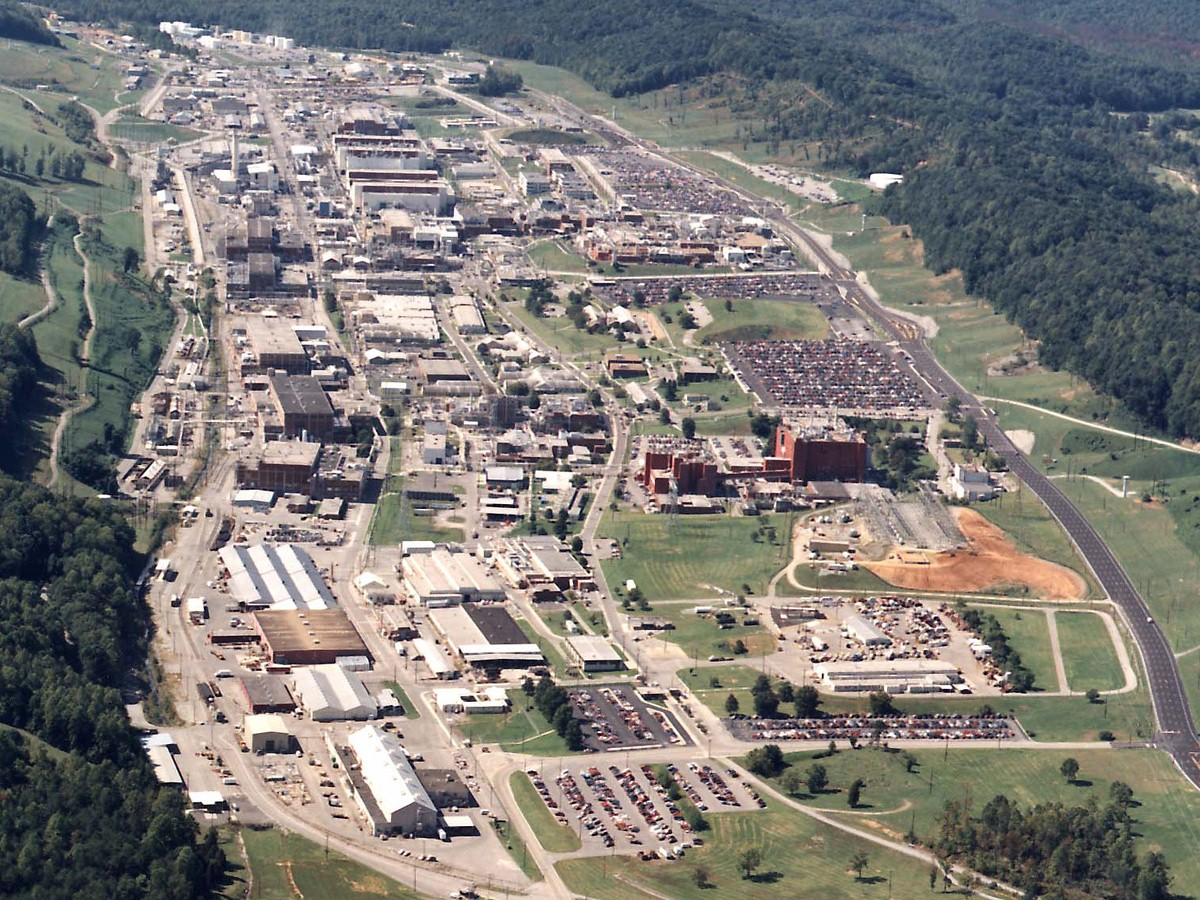
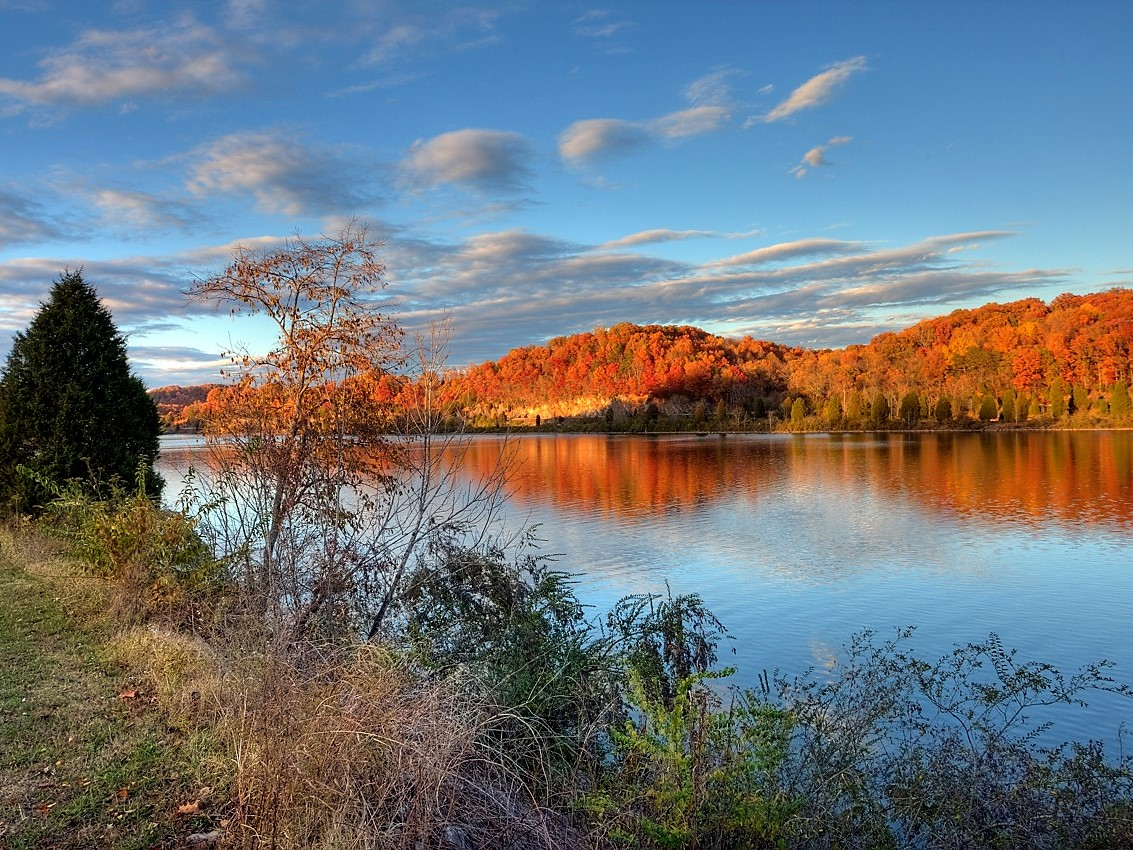
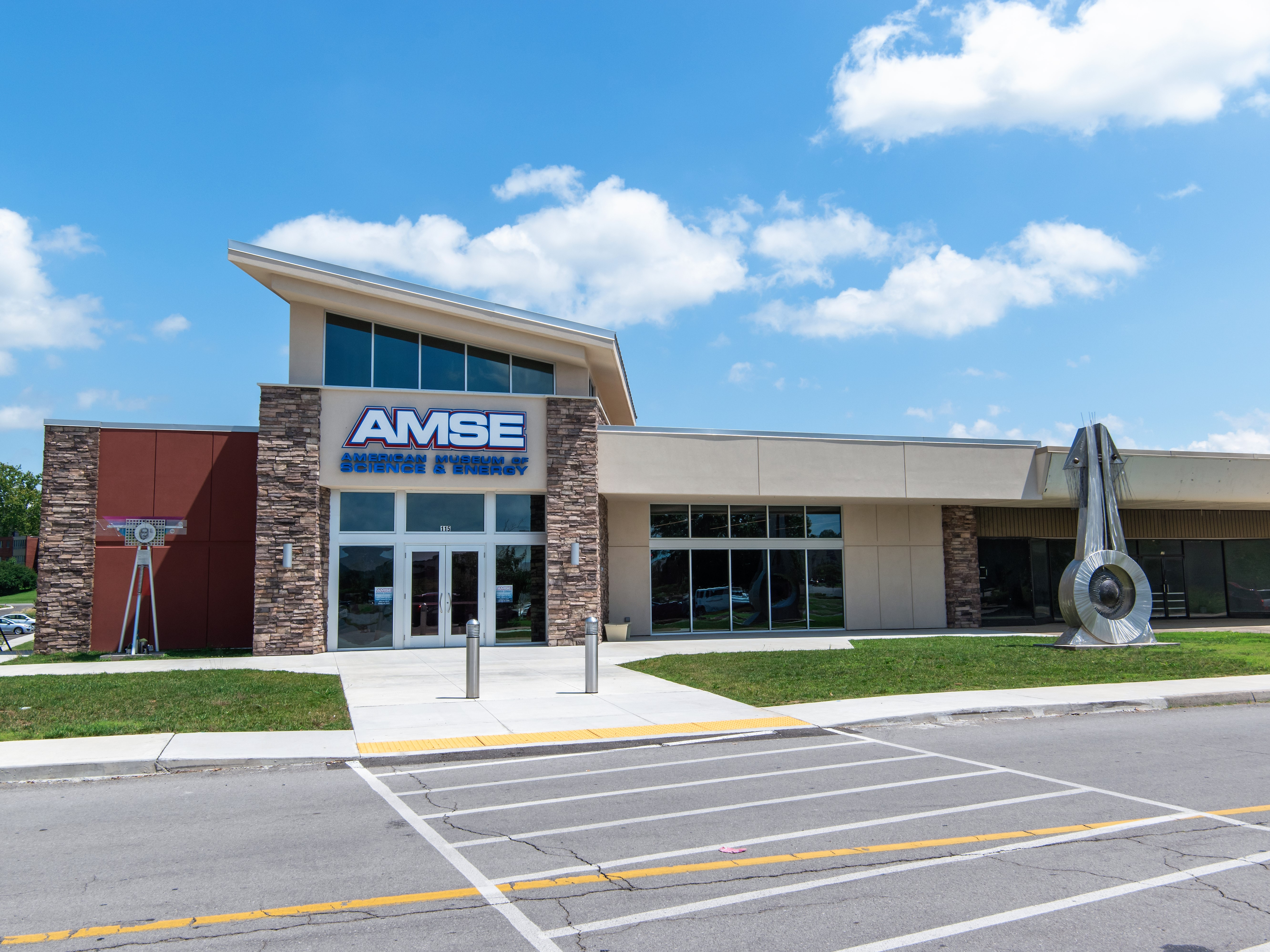
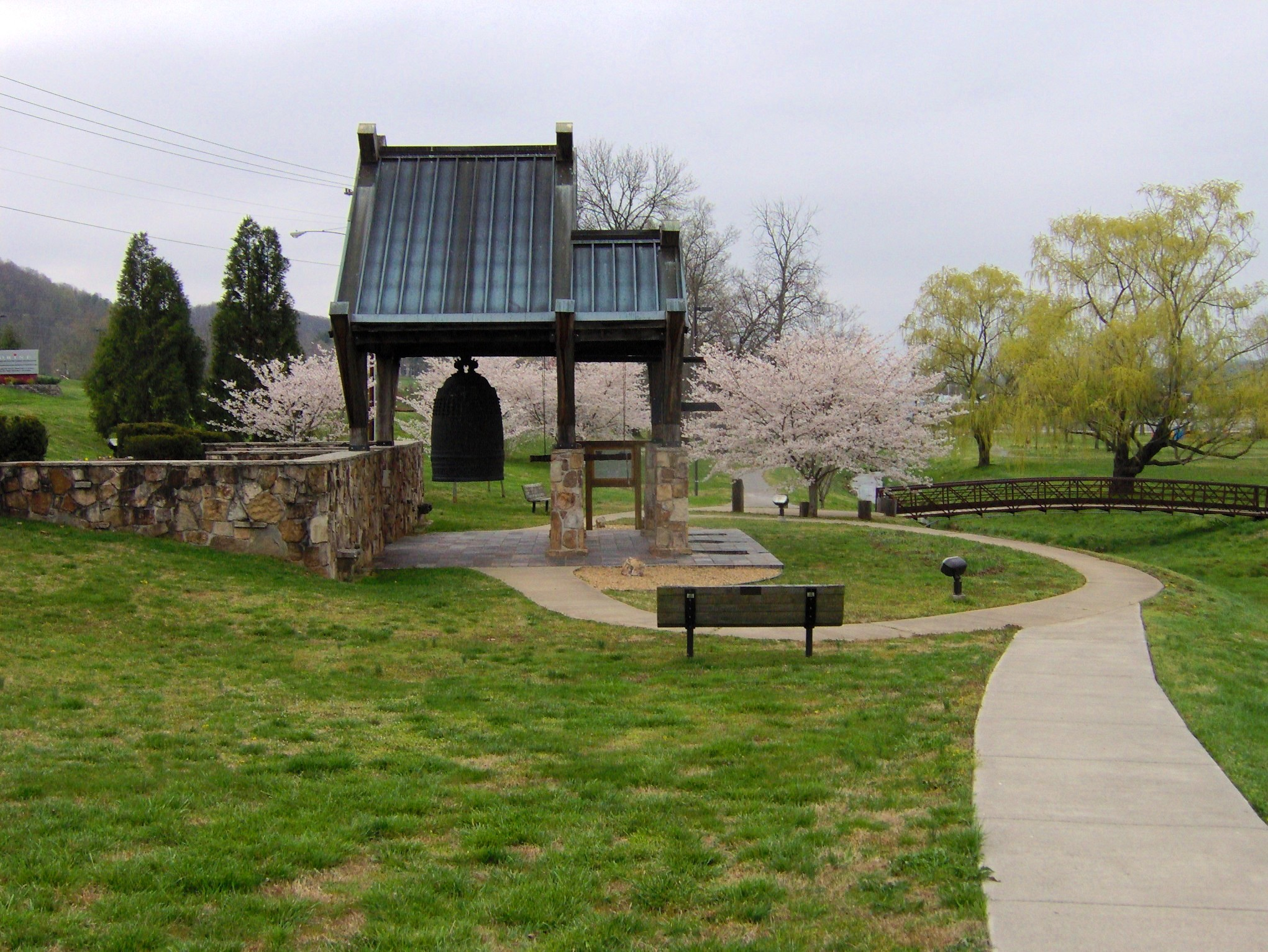
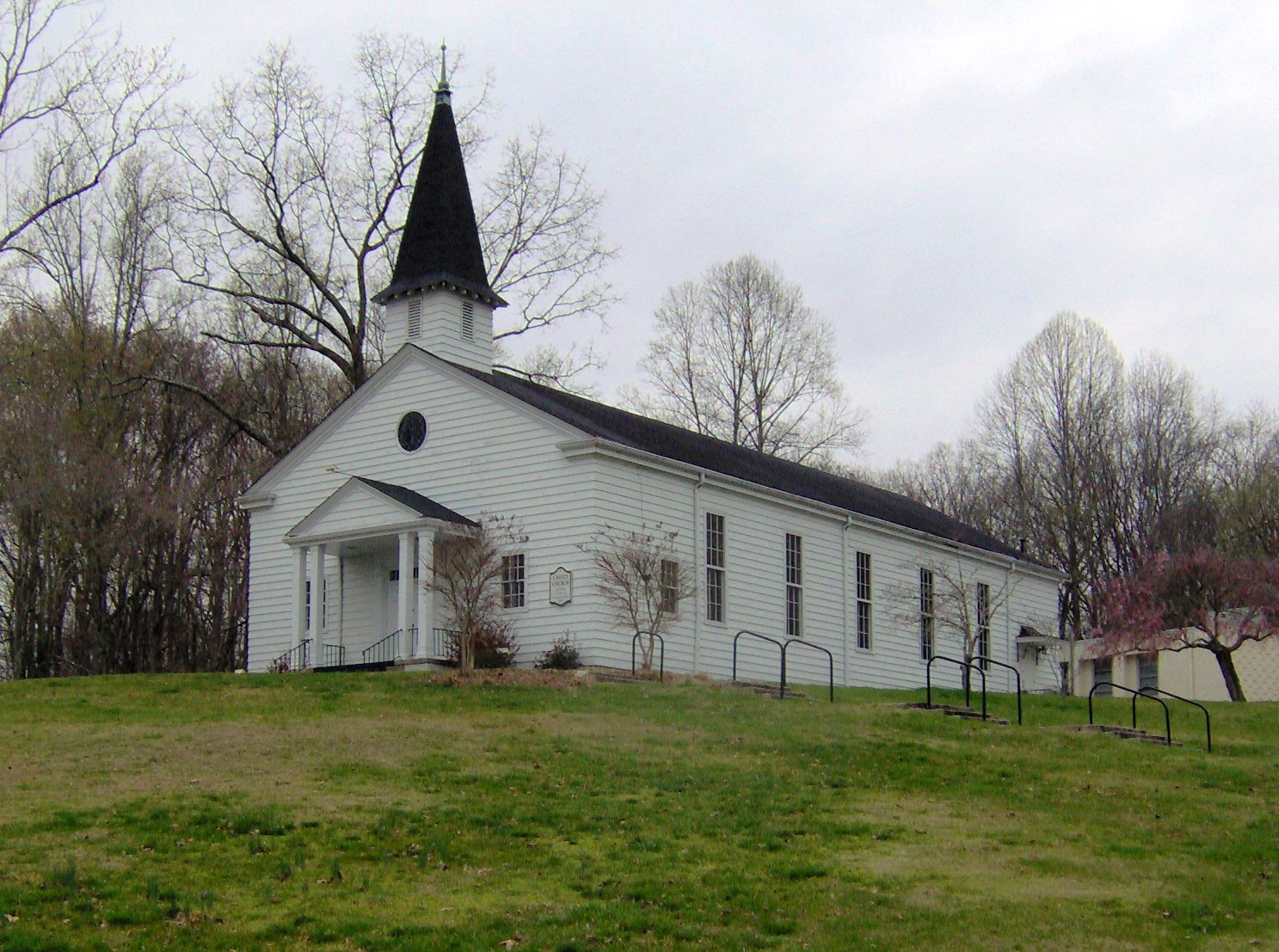
- Images, from top down, left to right: Oak Ridge National Laboratory, Commemorative Walk monument, Y-12 National Security Complex, Melton Hill Lake, American Museum of Science and Energy, International Friendship Bell, The Chapel on the Hill

- Flag Seal Logo
- Nicknames: The Atomic City, The Secret City, The City Behind a Fence
- Motto: "The Vision Lives On"
- Location of Oak Ridge in Anderson and Roane Counties, Tennessee.
- Coordinates: 36°0′37″N 84°16′11″W
- Country: United States
- State: Tennessee
- Counties: Anderson, Roane
- Established: 1942
- Incorporated: 1959

Government
  - Type: Council-manager (under home-rule charter)
  - Mayor: Warren Gooch (D) (Note: Tennessee Code 2-13-208 requires all municipal elections and their respective offices to be nonpartisan.)
  - City Manager: Randall Hemann
  - City Council: List of Councilmembers: Jim Dodson (also Mayor pro tempore); Sean Gleason; Warren Gooch (also Mayor); Derrick Hammond; Charlie Hensley; Charles Hope II; Ellen Smith

Area
  - Total: 89.95 sq mi (232.98 km^{2})
  - Land: 85.25 sq mi (220.80 km^{2})
  - Water: 4.70 sq mi (12.18 km^{2})
  - Rank: 134th US
- Elevation: 850 ft (260 m)

Population (2020)
  - Total: 31,402
  - Density: 368.3/sq mi (142.22/km^{2})
- Time zone: UTC−5 (EST)
  - Summer (DST): UTC−4 (EDT)
- ZIP codes: 37830-37831
- Area code: 865
- FIPS code: 47-55120
- Website: oakridgetn.gov

Oak Ridge is a city in Anderson and Roane counties in the eastern part of the U.S. state of Tennessee, about 25 miles (40 km) west of downtown Knoxville. Oak Ridge's population was 31,402 at the 2020 census. It is part of the Knoxville Metropolitan Area. Oak Ridge's nicknames include the Atomic City, the Secret City, and the City Behind a Fence.

In 1942, the U.S. government forcibly purchased nearly 60,000 acres (240 km^{2}) of farmland in the Clinch River valley for the development of a planned city supporting 75,000 residents. It was constructed with assistance from architectural and engineering firm Skidmore, Owings & Merrill, from 1942 to 1943. Oak Ridge was established in 1942 as a production site for the Manhattan Project—the massive American, British, and Canadian operation that developed the atomic bomb. Oak Ridge National Laboratory, Y-12 National Security Complex, and several private nuclear and scientific facilities are still in Oak Ridge, and scientific and technological development plays a crucial role in its economy and culture. In 2016, the element tennessine was named for Tennessee, in recognition of the role Oak Ridge and other institutions in the state played in its discovery.

== History ==
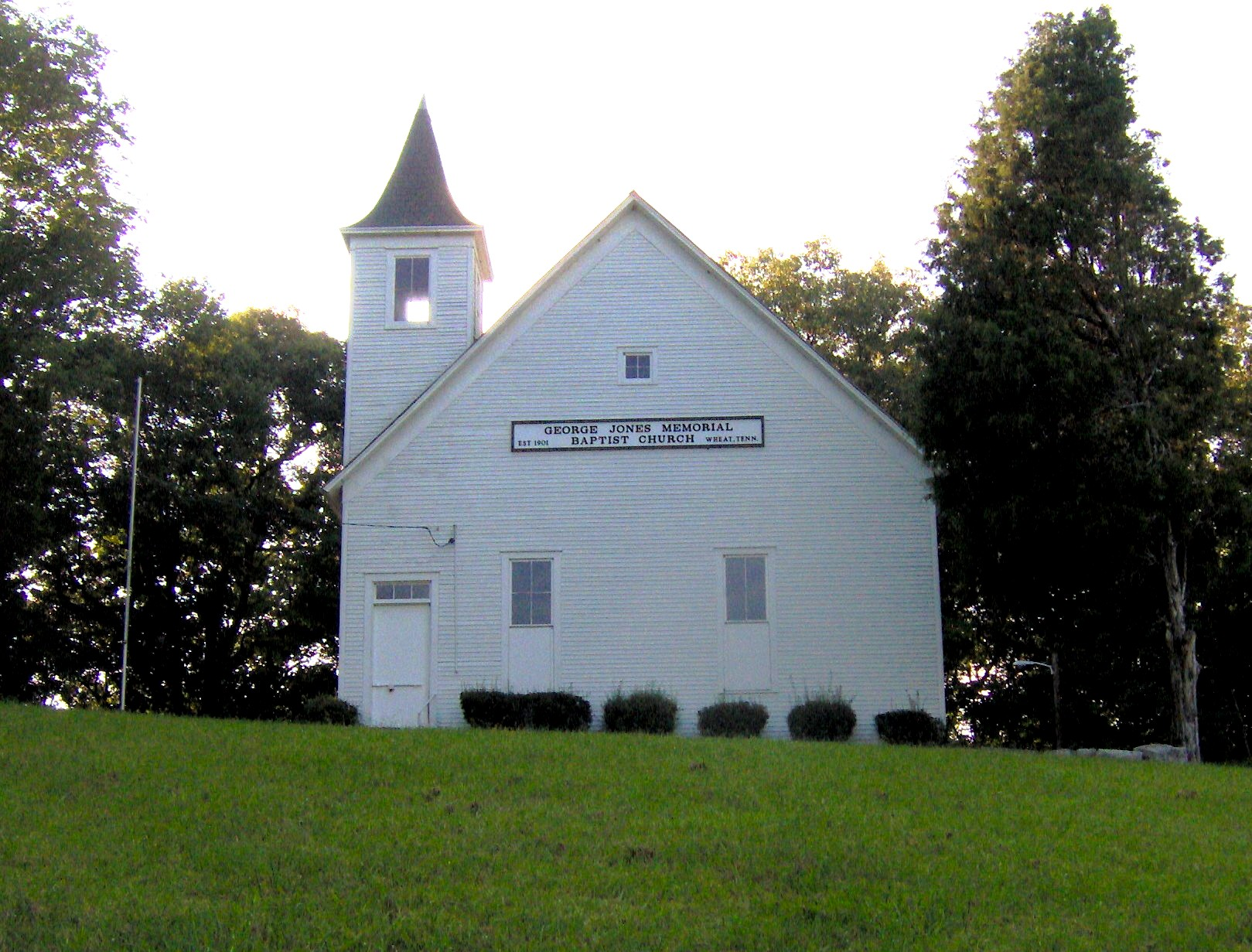
George Jones Memorial Baptist Church, built by the residents of Wheat in 1901

The earliest substantial occupation of the Oak Ridge area occurred during the Woodland period (c. 1000 BC – 1000), although artifacts dating to the Paleo-Indian period have been found throughout the Clinch River valley. Two Woodland mound sites—the Crawford Farm Mounds and the Freels Farm Mounds—were uncovered in the 1930s as part of the Norris Basin salvage excavations. Both sites were just southeast of the former Scarboro community. The Bull Bluff site, which was occupied during the Woodland and Mississippian (c. 1000–1600) periods, was uncovered in the 1960s in anticipation of the construction of Melton Hill Dam. Bull Bluff is a cliff immediately southeast of Haw Ridge, opposite Melton Hill Park.

The Oak Ridge area was largely uninhabited when Euro-American explorers and settlers arrived in the late 18th century, although the Cherokee claimed the land as part of their hunting grounds. The European-American settlers who founded these communities arrived in the late 1790s after the American Revolutionary War and after the Cherokee signed the Treaty of Holston, ceding what is now Anderson County to the United States.

During the early 19th century, several rural farming communities developed in the Oak Ridge area, namely Edgemoor and Elza in the northeast, East Fork and Wheat in the southwest, Robertsville in the west, and Bethel and Scarboro in the southeast.

A popular legend holds that John Hendrix (1865–1915), a largely unknown local man, predicted the creation of the city of Oak Ridge around 40 years before construction on the project began. Hendrix lacked any formal education and was a simple logger for much of his life. Following the death of his youngest daughter, Ethel, to diphtheria, and the subsequent departure of his wife and three remaining children, Hendrix began hearing voices in his head. These voices urged him to stay in the woods and pray for guidance for 40 days and 40 nights, which Hendrix proceeded to do. As the story is told, following these 40 days spent in rugged isolation, Hendrix began seeing visions of the future, and he sought to spread his prophetic message to any who would listen. According to published accounts, one vision that he described repeatedly was a description of the city and production facilities built 28 years after his death, during World War II.

The version recalled by neighbors and relatives reported:

In the woods, as I lay on the ground and looked up into the sky, there came to me a voice as loud and as sharp as thunder. The voice told me to sleep with my head on the ground for 40 nights and I would be shown visions of what the future holds for this land.... And I tell you, Bear Creek Valley someday will be filled with great buildings and factories, and they will help toward winning the greatest war that ever will be. And there will be a city on Black Oak Ridge and the center of authority will be on a spot middle-way between Sevier Tadlock's farm and Joe Pyatt's Place. A railroad spur will branch off the main L&N line, run down toward Robertsville and then branch off and turn toward Scarborough. Big engines will dig big ditches, and thousands of people will be running to and fro. They will be building things, and there will be great noise and confusion and the earth will shake. I've seen it. It's coming.

Hendrix, in light of his tales of prophetic visions, was considered insane by most and at one point was institutionalized. His grave lies in an area of Oak Ridge now known as the Hendrix Creek Subdivision. There are ongoing concerns over the preservation of his gravestone, as the man who owns the lot adjacent to the grave wishes to build a home there, while members of the Oak Ridge Heritage and Preservation Association are fighting to have a monument placed on the site of his grave.

=== Manhattan Project ===
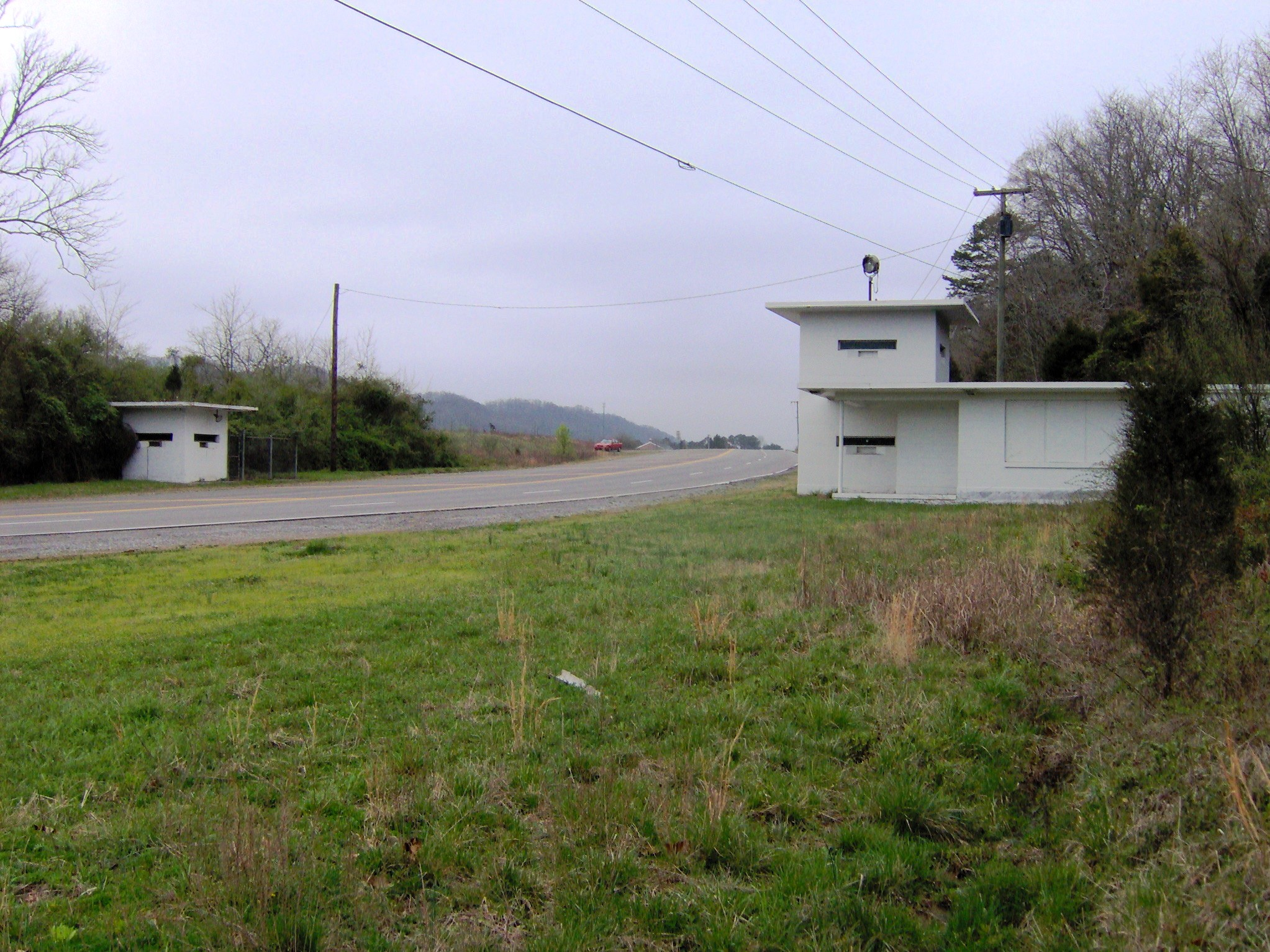
The Bethel Valley Checking Station

In 1942, the federal government chose the area as a site for developing materials for the Manhattan Project. Major General Leslie Groves, military head of the Manhattan Project, liked the area for several reasons. Its relatively low population made acquisition affordable, yet the area was accessible by highway and rail, and utilities such as water and electricity were readily available with the recent completion of Norris Dam. The project location was established within a 17-mile-long (27 km) valley. This feature was linear and partitioned by several ridges, providing natural protection against the spread of disasters at the four major industrial plants—so the plants would not blow up "like firecrackers on a string".

In October 1942, the United States Army Corps of Engineers began acquiring approximately 59,000 acres (24,000 ha) in the Oak Ridge area for the Manhattan Project. Due to the project's urgency and secrecy, the Corps' "declaration of taking" was swift and final. Many residents came home to find eviction notices on their doors. Others found out when their children came home from school with a message from the principal: Senator McKellar wants me to tell you to go home and tell your parents you are going to have to find another place to live." There was no further explanation. All the students were told was, "The government is going to take your property for the war effort." Several families who had moved to the Oak Ridge area after displacement by the Tennessee Valley Authority were displaced again by the Manhattan Project campaign. The average price per acre paid was $46.86.

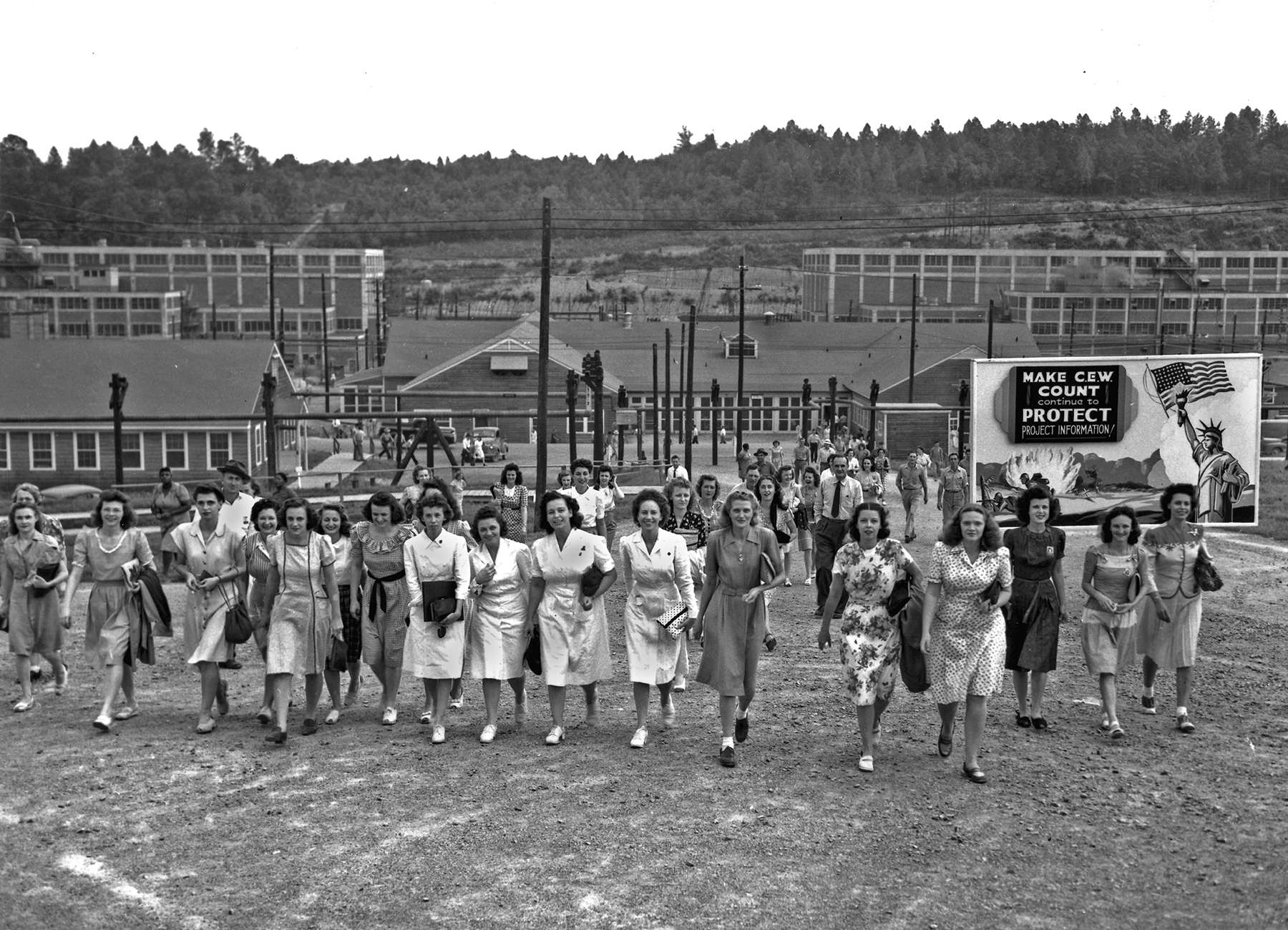
Workers leaving the Manhattan Project's Y-12 plant at shift changing time, 1945

By March 1943 the Corps had removed the area's earlier communities and established fences and checkpoints. Anderson County lost one-seventh of its land and $391,000 in annual property tax revenue. The manner in which the government acquired Oak Ridge created a tense, uneasy relationship between the Oak Ridge complex and the surrounding towns. Although the area's original residents were allowed to be buried in existing cemeteries, every coffin was reportedly opened for inspection. The Corps' Manhattan Engineer District (MED) managed the acquisition and clearing for what was to be first known as the Clinton Engineer Works. The Y-12, K-25, and S-50 plants were each built in Oak Ridge to separate the fissile isotope uranium-235 from natural uranium, which consists almost entirely of the isotope uranium-238. The X-10 site, now the site of Oak Ridge National Laboratory, was established as a pilot plant for production of plutonium using the Graphite Reactor, used to develop full-scale plutonium production at the Hanford Site.

During construction of the electromagnets required for the uranium separation process at the Y-12 site, a shortage of copper forced the MED to borrow 14,700 tons of silver bullion from the United States Treasury as a copper substitute in wire for the electromagnet coils.

When Tennessee Governor Prentice Cooper was officially handed the July 1943 presidential proclamation by a junior officer (a lieutenant)—making Oak Ridge a military district not subject to state control—he tore it up and refused to see the Manhattan Project engineer, Lieutenant Colonel James C. Marshall. The new district engineer, Lieutenant Colonel Kenneth Nichols, had to placate him. Cooper came to see the project (except for the production facilities under construction) on November 3, 1943, and he appreciated the bourbon-laced punch served (although Anderson County was "dry").

House and dormitory accommodations to support construction workers contracted to build the Clinton Engineer Works (CEW) in Oak Ridge were basic, consisting of trailers, barracks, and many "hutments"—pre-fabricated five-person huts heated by a central coal-powered furnace. Construction camps were segregated between black workers and white workers. Two of the largest were Gamble Valley, with up to 4,000 trailer spaces, and Happy Valley, whose population grew from about 5,000 to about 15,000. In addition to trailers and hutments, the camp towns included various recreational buildings (e.g., theaters and bowling alleys), cafeterias, and commissaries. Medical care was provided by Army doctors and hospitals, with civilians paying $2.50 per month ($5 for families) to the medical insurance fund.

=== Planned community ===
The location and low population helped keep the town a secret, though the settlement grew from 3,000 to 3,750 in 1942 to about 75,000 by 1945. Because of the large number of workers recruited to the area for the Manhattan Project, the Army planned a town for project workers at the eastern end of the valley. The time required for the project's completion caused the Army to opt for a relatively permanent establishment rather than an enormous camp. The name "Oak Ridge" was chosen for the settlement in 1943 from suggestions submitted by project employees. The name evoked the settlement's location along Black Oak Ridge, and officials thought the rural-sounding name "held outside curiosity to a minimum". The name was formally adopted in 1949.

The architectural and engineering firm Skidmore, Owings & Merrill was contracted to provide the layout for the town and house designs. John O. Merrill moved to Tennessee to take charge of designing Oak Ridge's secret buildings. He directed the creation of a town, which soon had 300 miles (480 km) of roads, 55 miles (89 km) of railroad track, ten schools, seven theaters, 17 restaurants and cafeterias, and 13 supermarkets. A library with 9,400 books, a symphony orchestra, sporting facilities, church services for 17 denominations, and a Fuller Brush Company salesman served the new city and its 75,000 residents. No airport was built, for security reasons. Prefabricated modular homes, apartments, and dormitories, many made from cemesto (bonded cement and asbestos) panels, were quickly erected. Streets were laid out in the manner of a "planned community".

The original streets included several main east-to-west roads, namely the Oak Ridge Turnpike, Tennessee Avenue, Pennsylvania Avenue, Hillside Road, Robertsville Road, and Outer Drive. North-to-south oriented streets connecting these main roads were designated "avenues", and streets branching off from the avenues were designated "roads", "places", "lanes", or "circles". "Roads" connected two streets, while "lanes" and "places" were dead ends. The names of the main avenues generally progressed alphabetically from east to west (e.g., Alabama Avenue in the east, Vermont Avenue in the west), and the names of the smaller streets began with the same letter as the main avenue from which they started (e.g., streets connected to Florida Avenue began with "F").

The dramatic population increase and the secret nature of the project meant chronic shortages of housing and supplies during the war years. The town was administered by Turner Construction Company through a subsidiary named the Roane-Anderson Company. But most residents knew their "landlord" as "MSI" (Management Services, Inc.). All workers wore badges. The town was surrounded by guard towers and a fence with seven gates.

=== Segregation and desegregation ===
Oak Ridge was developed by the federal government as a segregated community at the insistence of the Southern bloc of Democrats in Congress, which authorized its funding. Because Black workers generally held lower-ranked jobs, their assigned dwellings were predominantly government-built "hutments" (one-room shacks) very close to the Y-12 plant, in the one residential area designated as colored. Nichols, the MED District Engineer, was told by the main construction contractor for the K-25 plant that the black construction labor force had a large turnover rate, so Nichols gave permission to set up a separate black women's camp. When Groves visited the plant with K. T. Keller of Chrysler, Keller saw twelve Black women sweeping the 30-foot wide alley between the production units, and said, "Nichols, don't you know there is a machine made to sweep a concrete floor like this?" Nichols replied, "Sure I do, but these gals can do more than one of those machines". The men had an opportunity to "fracas" on Saturday night, and labor turnover had reduced.

During the war, plans were made for a colored neighborhood of houses equal in quality to those for whites, but it was not implemented because of limited resources. After the war, all hutments were dismantled, and a colored neighborhood of permanent houses was developed in the Gamble Valley area, which during wartime had been occupied by a white trailer community.

Oak Ridge elementary education before 1954 was segregated; it was legally part of the Anderson County system but built and operated primarily with federal funds. Black children could attend only the Scarboro Elementary School. Oak Ridge High School was closed to black students, who had to be bused to Knoxville for education. Starting in 1950, Scarboro High School was established at Scarboro Elementary School to offer classes for African-American students. In 1955, 85 young Black students from the Scarboro community were the first to enter all-white classes in Oak Ridge High School and Robertsville Junior High School (now Robertsville Middle School). In 2023, on the 68th anniversary, a Scarboro 85 Monument was erected in Oak Ridge.

Robertsville Junior High School, serving Oak Ridge's western half, was desegregated at the same time as the high school. Elementary schools in other parts of the city and Jefferson Junior High School, serving the city's eastern half, were desegregated slowly as African-American families moved into housing outside Gamble Valley. In 1967 Scarboro Elementary School was closed, and African-American students from Gamble Valley were bused to other schools around the city.

The nearby high school in Clinton was desegregated in 1956. On October 5, 1958, the school was severely damaged after a series of dynamite explosions. An estimated 75 to 100 sticks of dynamite had been placed in three locations in the building. No one was injured, but the school closed while it was rebuilt. Oak Ridge provided space at a recently vacated elementary school building (the original Linden Elementary School) for the education of high school students from Clinton for two years while Clinton High School was rebuilt.

After the Brown decision, public accommodations in Oak Ridge were integrated over several years. In 1955, the spring-fed Oak Ridge Municipal Outdoor Swimming Pool, which had been completed in 1945, became integrated. In the early 1960s, Oak Ridge briefly experienced protest picketing against racial segregation in public accommodations, notably outside a local cafeteria and a laundromat.

=== Since World War II ===
Two years after World War II ended, Oak Ridge was shifted to civilian control, under the authority of the U.S. Atomic Energy Commission. The Roane Anderson Company administered community functions, including arranging housing and operating buses, under a government contract. In 1959 the town was incorporated. The community adopted a city manager and City Council form of government rather than direct federal control.

The S-50 liquid thermal diffusion plant was demolished soon after the war. The K-25 building, where uranium was enriched by the gaseous diffusion process until 1985 as the Oak Ridge Gaseous Diffusion Plant (ORGDP), was demolished in 2013–15 under Superfund as well as the other nearby production and support facilities in the years after. Much of the land associated with the former ORGDP has been transferred or leased for private and federal industrial reuse or dedicated as a National Historic Park.

Two of the four major plants created for the wartime bomb production remain in use today:

- Y-12, originally used for electromagnetic separation of uranium, is now used for nuclear weapons processing and materials storage and known as the Y-12 National Security Complex. Y-12 is managed by the National Nuclear Security Administration.
- X-10, site of a graphite test reactor, is now Oak Ridge National Laboratory (ORNL). The Department of Energy (DOE) runs ORNL, a nuclear and high-tech research establishment.

In 1983, the DOE declassified a report showing that significant amounts of mercury had been released from the Oak Ridge Reservation into the East Fork Poplar Creek between 1950 and 1977. Circa 1989, a federal court ordered the DOE to bring the Oak Ridge Reservation into compliance with federal and state environmental regulations, such as RCRA. In addition, the Oak Ridge Reservation was put on the Environmental Protection Agency's National Priorities List as a Superfund site.

Oak Ridge National Laboratory is the largest multipurpose lab in the DOE's National Laboratory system. It is home to the Spallation Neutron Source, a $1.4 billion project completed in 2006, and "Titan", one of the world's most powerful scientific supercomputers, which has peak performance of more than one quadrillion operations per second. In 2018, IBM and ORNL unveiled Summit, the "world's fastest supercomputer", claimed to be more than twice as powerful as the previous world leader, with a peak performance of 200,000 trillion calculations per second.

The Y-12 National Security Complex is a component of the U.S. nuclear weapons complex. The DOE's Environmental Management office is conducting an extensive program of decontamination and decommissioning, environmental cleanup, and waste management to remove or stabilize the hazardous residue remaining from decades of government production and research activities.

Oak Ridge's scientific heritage is curated in the American Museum of Science and Energy. Its role in the Manhattan Project is preserved in the Manhattan Project National Historical Park (along with sites in Hanford, Washington, and Los Alamos, New Mexico), run cooperatively by the National Park Service and the Department of Energy. A bus tour and several virtual tours are available for the public.

== Geography ==
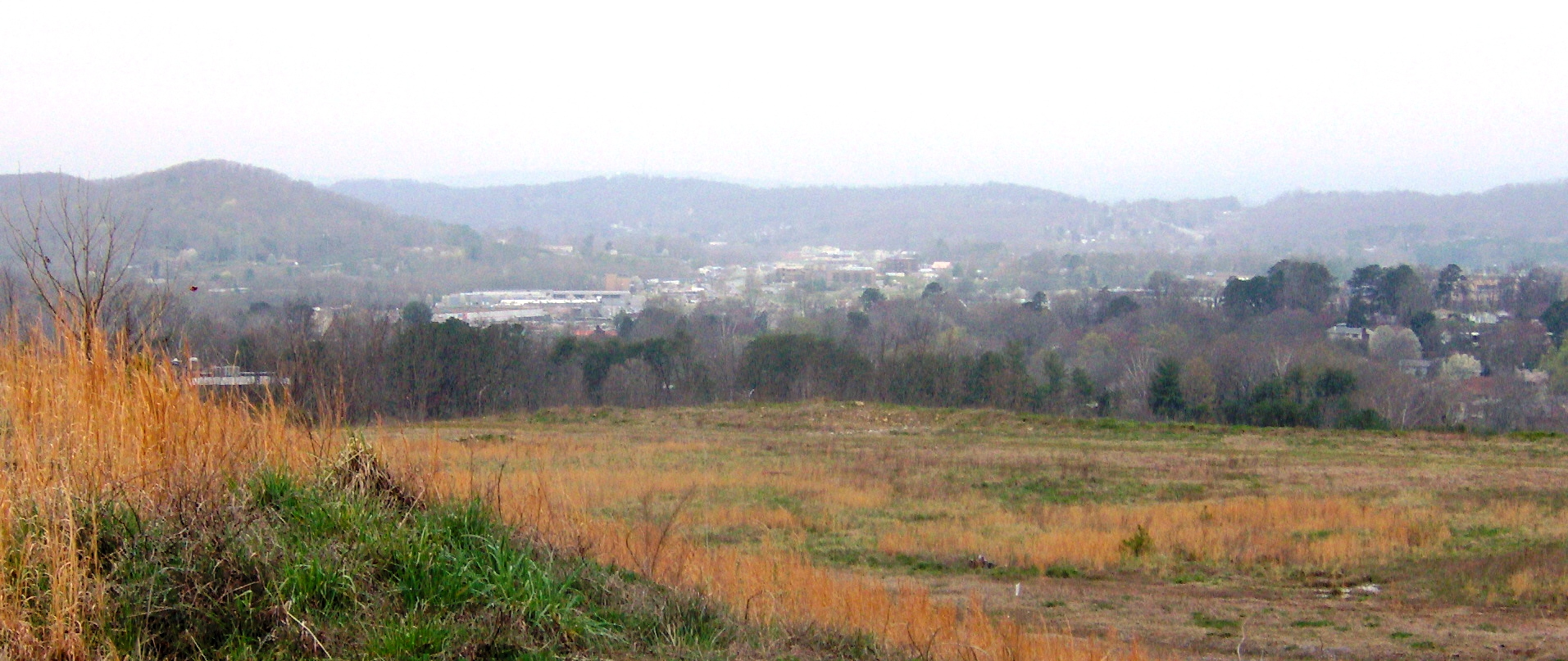
View from the Oak Ridge Summit, a barren knob on the north slope of Pine Ridge; East Fork Ridge is on the left, Blackoak Ridge spans the horizon.

Immediately northeast of Oak Ridge, the southwestward-flowing Clinch River bends sharply to the southeast for roughly 6 miles (10 km) toward Solway, where it turns again to the southwest. After flowing for approximately 17 miles (27 km), the river bends sharply to the northwest at Copper Ridge, and continues in this direction for nearly 7 miles (11 km). At the K-25 plant, the Clinch turns southwest again and flows for another 11 miles (18 km) to its mouth along the Tennessee River at Kingston. This series of bends creates a half-rectangle formation—surrounded by water on the northeast, east, and southwest—in which Oak Ridge is situated.

The Oak Ridge area is striated by five ridges that run roughly parallel to one another in a northeast-to-southwest direction. In order from west to east, they are Blackoak Ridge (which connects the Elza and K-25 bends of the Clinch and thus "walls off" the half-rectangle), East Fork Ridge, Pine Ridge, Chestnut Ridge, and Haw Ridge. The five ridges are divided by four valleys: East Fork Valley (between Blackoak Ridge and East Fork Ridge), Gamble Valley (between East Fork Ridge and Pine Ridge), Bear Creek Valley (between Pine Ridge and Chestnut Ridge), and Bethel Valley (between Chestnut and Haw). These ridges and valleys are part of the Ridge-and-Valley Appalachians physiographic province. The city's main section is in the northeast, where East Fork and Pine Ridge give way to low, scattered hills. Many of the city's residences are along Blackoak Ridge's relatively steep northeastern slope.

The completion of Melton Hill Dam (along the Clinch near Copper Ridge) in 1963 created Melton Hill Lake, which borders the city on the northeast and east. The lakefront on the east side of the city is a popular recreation area, with bicycling trails and picnic areas lining the shore. The lake is well known as a venue for rowing competitions. Watts Bar Lake, an impoundment of the Tennessee River that covers the lower 23 miles (37 km) of the Clinch, borders Oak Ridge to the south and southwest.

According to the United States Census Bureau, the city has an area of 90.0 square miles (233.0 km^{2}), of which 85.3 square miles (220.8 km^{2}) is land and 4.7 square miles (12.2 km^{2}), or 5.25%, is water. The highest point is Melton Hill (35.90962°N 84.30525°W) on the DOE reservation, at 1,356 feet (413 m).

=== Climate ===
Like much of the rest of the state, Oak Ridge has a humid subtropical climate (Cfa in the Köppen climate classification); it is part of USDA hardiness zone 7a. The normal monthly mean temperature ranges from 37.9 °F (3.3 °C) in January to 77.5 °F (25.3 °C) in July, while on average there are 4.3 days where the temperature stays at or below freezing and 39 days with a high at or above 90 °F (32 °C) per year. The all-time record low is −17 °F (−27 °C), set on January 21, 1985, while the all-time record high is 105 °F (41 °C), set on June 30, 2012, and July 28, 1952. Temperatures reaching either 0 °F (−18 °C) or 100 °F (38 °C) are uncommon, having last occurred on February 5, 1996 (the date of the all-time record low for February), and July 1, 2012.

Precipitation averages 59.70 inches (1,516 mm) annually and reaches a low in late summer. The rainiest calendar day on record is August 10, 1960, when 7.45 inches (189 mm) of rain fell; monthly precipitation has ranged from trace amounts in October 1963 to 19.27 inches (489 mm) in July 1967.

Climate data for Oak Ridge (Atmospheric Turbulence & Diffusion Division), Tennessee (1991–2020 normals, (Note: Mean monthly maxima and minima (i.e. the expected highest and lowest temperature readings at any point during the year or given month) calculated based on data at said location from 1991 to 2020.) extremes 1947–present)
Month	Jan	Feb	Mar	Apr	May	Jun	Jul	Aug	Sep	Oct	Nov	Dec	Year
Record high °F (°C)	76 (24)	82 (28)	86 (30)	92 (33)	96 (36)	105 (41)	105 (41)	103 (39)	102 (39)	98 (37)	85 (29)	78 (26)	105 (41)
Mean maximum °F (°C)	67.3 (19.6)	71.2 (21.8)	79.4 (26.3)	86.0 (30.0)	89.6 (32.0)	93.8 (34.3)	96.0 (35.6)	94.8 (34.9)	92.5 (33.6)	84.6 (29.2)	75.3 (24.1)	67.4 (19.7)	96.8 (36.0)
Mean daily maximum °F (°C)	46.6 (8.1)	51.4 (10.8)	60.7 (15.9)	70.4 (21.3)	77.7 (25.4)	84.0 (28.9)	87.0 (30.6)	86.6 (30.3)	81.0 (27.2)	71.0 (21.7)	58.9 (14.9)	49.3 (9.6)	68.7 (20.4)
Daily mean °F (°C)	37.9 (3.3)	41.7 (5.4)	49.7 (9.8)	58.6 (14.8)	66.9 (19.4)	74.1 (23.4)	77.5 (25.3)	76.8 (24.9)	70.8 (21.6)	59.7 (15.4)	48.1 (8.9)	40.9 (4.9)	58.6 (14.8)
Mean daily minimum °F (°C)	29.2 (−1.6)	32.1 (0.1)	38.7 (3.7)	46.8 (8.2)	56.1 (13.4)	64.1 (17.8)	68.1 (20.1)	67.0 (19.4)	60.6 (15.9)	48.4 (9.1)	37.3 (2.9)	32.4 (0.2)	48.4 (9.1)
Mean minimum °F (°C)	11.3 (−11.5)	16.2 (−8.8)	22.4 (−5.3)	31.5 (−0.3)	41.0 (5.0)	53.7 (12.1)	60.4 (15.8)	59.3 (15.2)	47.4 (8.6)	33.2 (0.7)	23.8 (−4.6)	17.7 (−7.9)	8.7 (−12.9)
Record low °F (°C)	−17 (−27)	−13 (−25)	1 (−17)	20 (−7)	30 (−1)	39 (4)	49 (9)	50 (10)	33 (1)	21 (−6)	0 (−18)	−7 (−22)	−17 (−27)
Average precipitation inches (mm)	5.50 (140)	5.93 (151)	5.55 (141)	5.58 (142)	4.50 (114)	4.76 (121)	5.90 (150)	3.72 (94)	4.13 (105)	3.29 (84)	5.00 (127)	5.84 (148)	59.70 (1,516)
Average snowfall inches (cm)	1.8 (4.6)	1.4 (3.6)	0.6 (1.5)	0.0 (0.0)	0.0 (0.0)	0.0 (0.0)	0.0 (0.0)	0.0 (0.0)	0.0 (0.0)	0.0 (0.0)	0.0 (0.0)	0.6 (1.5)	4.4 (11)
Average precipitation days (≥ 0.01 in)	11.9	11.7	12.3	11.0	12.0	12.3	12.5	10.0	8.2	8.4	9.2	12.2	131.7
Average snowy days (≥ 0.1 in)	1.2	1.1	0.4	0.0	0.0	0.0	0.0	0.0	0.0	0.0	0.0	0.6	3.3
Source: NOAA

== Demographics ==
Historical population
Census	Pop.	Note	%±
1960	27,169		—
1970	28,319		4.2%
1980	27,662		−2.3%
1990	27,310		−1.3%
2000	27,387		0.3%
2010	29,330		7.1%
2020	31,402		7.1%
2025 (est.)	35,395	▲	12.7%

=== 2020 census ===
As of the 2020 census, Oak Ridge had a population of 31,402, 13,363 households, and 8,241 families. The population density was 368.4 per square mile (142.2/km^{2}). 92.6% of residents lived in urban areas, while 7.4% lived in rural areas.

There were 13,363 households in Oak Ridge, of which 27.5% had children under the age of 18 living in them. Of all households, 43.3% were married-couple households, 19.6% were households with a male householder and no spouse or partner present, and 30.7% were households with a female householder and no spouse or partner present. About 32.8% of all households were made up of individuals and 13.6% had someone living alone who was 65 years of age or older.

There were 14,678 housing units at an average density of 172.2 per square mile (66.5/km^{2}); 9.0% were vacant. The homeowner vacancy rate was 2.0% and the rental vacancy rate was 9.2%.

21.3% of the population was under the age of 18, 7.9% from 18 to 24, 24.3% from 25 to 44, 25.6% from 45 to 64, and 20.9% who were 65 years of age or older. The median age was 42.0 years. For every 100 females there were 91.6 males, and for every 100 females age 18 and over there were 88.4 males.

Racial composition as of the 2020 census
Race	Number	Percent
White	24,679	78.6%
Black or African American	2,353	7.5%
American Indian and Alaska Native	136	0.4%
Asian	822	2.6%
Native Hawaiian and Other Pacific Islander	47	0.1%
Some other race	842	2.7%
Two or more races	2,523	8.0%
Hispanic or Latino (of any race)	1,933	6.2%

The proportion of residents with a bachelor's degree or higher was estimated at 23.8%.

According to the 2016–2020 five-year American Community Survey estimates, the median household income was $55,869 (with a margin of error of +/− $3,567). The median family income was $67,282 (+/− $4,238). Men had a median income of $41,848 (+/− $4,832) versus $29,292 (+/− $3,190) for women. The median income for those above 16 years old was $34,291 (+/− $1,809). About 12.2% of families and 15.6% of the population were below the poverty line, including 21.2% of those under the age of 18 and 7.8% of those ages 65 or over.

=== 2010 census ===
As of the 2010 United States census, there was a population of 29,330, with 12,772 households and 7,921 families residing in the city. The population density was 344.0 inhabitants per square mile (132.8/km^{2}). There were 14,494 housing units at an average density of 161.2 per square mile (62.2/km^{2}). The racial makeup of the city was 86.8% White (81.8% non-Hispanic), 8.1% African American, 0.4% Native American or Alaska Native, 2.5% Asian, 0.03% Pacific Islander, 2.0% from other races, and 3.0% from two or more races. Hispanics or Latinos of any race were 4.6% of the population.

The median income for a household in the city was $48,716, and the median income for a family was $69,333. Full-time, year-round male workers had a median income of $54,316 versus $36,140 for females in the same employment situation. The per capita income for the city was $30,430. About 10.7% of families and 16.0% of the population were below the poverty line, including 28.1% of those under age 18 and 6.7% of those age 65 or over.

== Economy ==
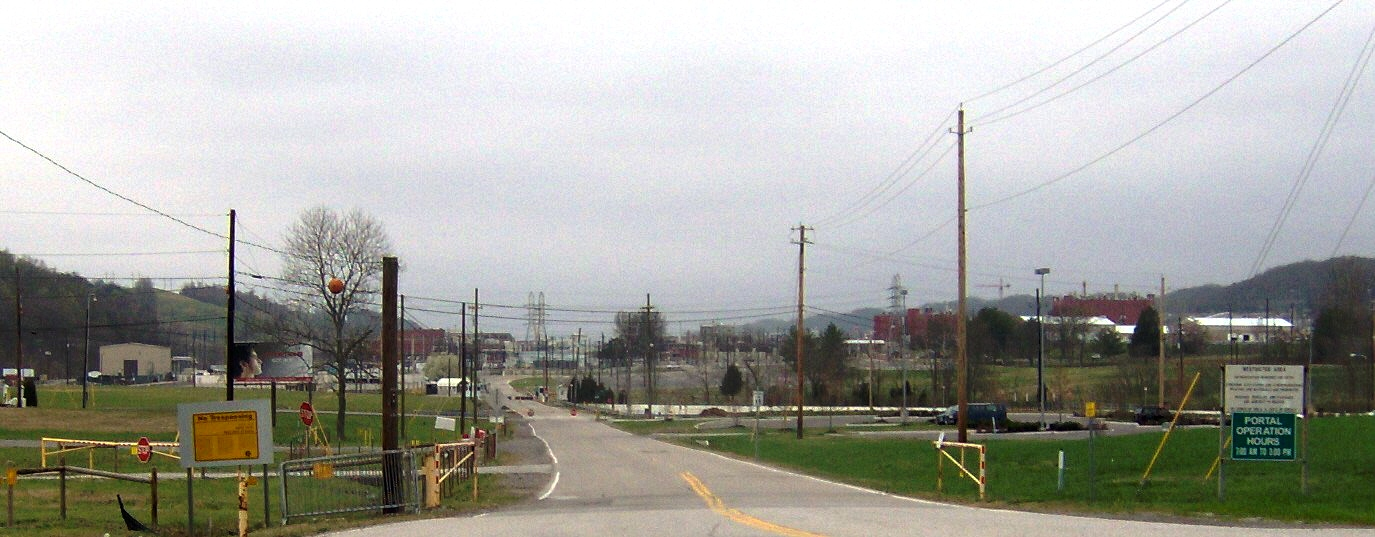
One of the entrances to Y-12

Federal government projects at Oak Ridge are reduced in size and scope, but are still the city's principal economic activity and one of the Knoxville metropolitan area's largest employers. The DOE—including the Office of Science, the Office of Environmental Management, and NNSA—owns the federal sites and maintains a major office in the city. Several federal prime contractors have roles on the Oak Ridge Reservation, including Consolidated Nuclear Security, UCOR (an Amentum-led company), and UT–Battelle.

The DOE Office of Scientific and Technical Information disseminates government research and development information and operates the website science.gov. The Oak Ridge Institute for Science and Education, operated by Oak Ridge Associated Universities, conducts research and education programs for the DOE, Department of Homeland Security, and other federal agencies. The Atmospheric Turbulence and Diffusion Division (ATDD), one of several field divisions of the National Oceanic and Atmospheric Administration Air Resources Laboratory, is also in the city. ATDD began under AEC sponsorship in 1948 as a Weather Bureau research office providing meteorological information and expertise for the AEC. Its main function now is to perform air quality-related research for issues of national and global importance.

The nuclear industry has continued to grow in Oak Ridge since the K-25 site was demolished. To date, more than 1,700 acres of the Oak Ridge Reservation have been transferred to the community that now house other nuclear companies, including Triso-X (nuclear fuel production), Kairos Power (small modular reactor project), and Ultra Safe Nuclear Corporation. In September 2024, Orano USA selected Oak Ridge as the future site of a new multi-billion-dollar uranium enrichment facility.

Boeing operated a manufacturing plant in the city beginning in the early 1980s. It closed in 2007. IPIX, Remotec (now a subsidiary of Northrop Grumman), ZYP Coatings, ORTEC (now a subsidiary of AMETEK), Nuclear Lead, Vol Case & Container, American Magnetics, RbM Services, Vacuum Technology, and several other technology-based companies were founded in Oak Ridge, including Greg LeMond's carbon fiber-manufacturing business, LeMond Composites. Several radioactive waste processing companies, including EnergySolutions, have operations in Oak Ridge.

The infrastructure that was new in the 1940s is aging. The once isolated city is now incorporated into the Knoxville metropolitan area. Oak Ridge is now challenged to blend into Knoxville's suburban orbit as its heritage as a "super secret" government installation subsides. Changing economic forces have led to continuing changes in the commercial sector. For example, the Oak Ridge City Center, a shopping center built in the 1950s and converted to an indoor shopping mall in the 1980s, sat largely empty in the years leading to its eventual partial demolition and redevelopment.

In 2003, Oak Ridge extended its borders west beyond the Clinch River boundary to annex the master planned community the Preserve at Oak Ridge. In 2020, the Oak Ridge City Council approved the "Wilson Street Corridor" project plan, intended to develop and construct a downtown area along Wilson Street. The plan consists of a mixed-use development of retail, residential usage, and restaurants, with a primary focus on multi-story residential space.

== Arts and culture ==
Points of interest include:

- Alexander Inn (retirement home)
- American Museum of Science and Energy
- Children's Museum of Oak Ridge
- East Tennessee Technology Park
- Manhattan Project National Historical Park, National Park Service and Department of Energy site
- Oak Ridge National Laboratory
- Office of Scientific and Technical Information
- United Church, The Chapel on the Hill
- University of Tennessee Arboretum
- Y-12 National Security Complex

== Sports ==
Oak Ridge has a rowing venue on the Melton Hill Lake that hosts U.S. Rowing events such as the US Rowing Youth Summer National Championship. Oak Ridge has hosted cycling events for USA Cycling, including the USA Cycling Individual Time Trial National Championships.

A Minor League Baseball team called the Oak Ridge Pioneers played at the city's Ridgeview Park for one season in 1954. The Oak Ridge Bombers played briefly in 1948 before relocating.

== Government ==
Oak Ridge uses the council-manager government system, which was established in 1959 when the city was incorporated. It is governed by a seven-member city council composed of the mayor and six council members.

Oak Ridge is represented in the Tennessee House of Representatives in the 33rd District in Anderson County, and the 32nd district in Roane County, by Representatives John Ragan and Kent Calfee respectively, both of whom are Republican. In the Tennessee Senate, Oak Ridge is represented in the 5th district in Anderson County and the 12th district in Roane County, by Lieutenant Governor of Tennessee and Senator Randy McNally, and Senator Ken Yager respectively, both of whom are Republican. Oak Ridge is represented in the United States House of Representatives by Republican Chuck Fleischmann of the 3rd congressional district.

=== Political makeup ===
Oak Ridge generally tilts Republican in statewide elections but can be competitive. The portion of the city in Roane County is more Republican and the portion in Anderson County is the most competitive.

Oak Ridge Presidential election results
Year	Republican	Democratic	Third parties
2024	51.01% 8,239	47.30% 7,641	1.69% 273
2020	48.90% 7,480	48.57% 7,429	2.52% 386
2016	49.60% 6,521	43.19% 5,679	7.21% 948

== Education ==
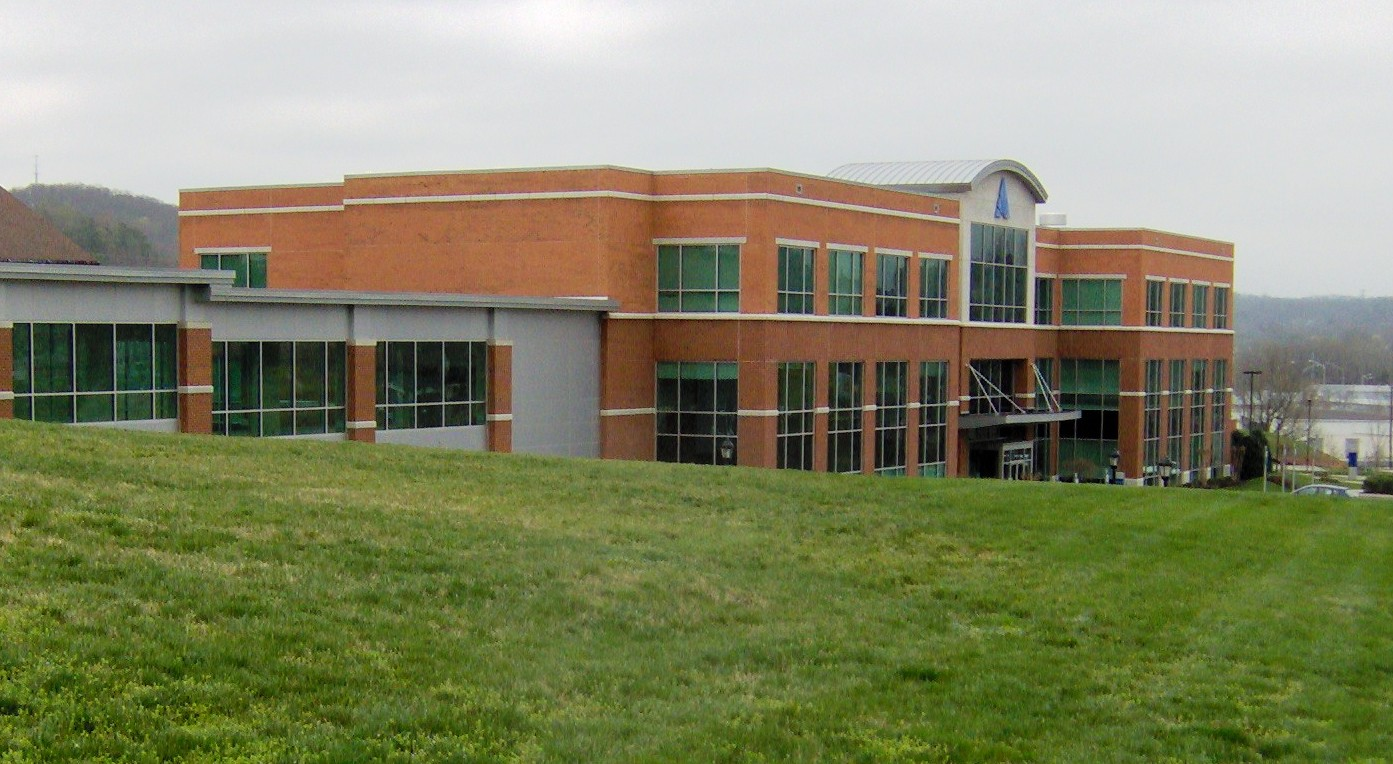
The ORISE building at Oak Ridge Associated Universities

The city operates a preschool, four elementary schools enrolling kindergarten through grade 4, two middle schools enrolling grades 5 through 8, and one high school enrolling grades 9 through 12. The Oak Ridge school district was ranked number one in the state of Tennessee, and Oak Ridge High School was ranked the number three high school in the state of Tennessee, in the Niche 2017 Best School Districts. Independent schools in the city include the Montessori School of Oak Ridge, St. Mary's School, and several preschools. The Oak Ridge Institute for Continued Learning offers a diverse array of educational opportunities for adults.

Roane State Community College has its largest branch campus in Oak Ridge. Other higher education organizations present in the community but not offering classes locally include the Oak Ridge Institute for Science and Education, Oak Ridge Associated Universities, and the University of Tennessee Forestry Stations and Arboretum.

== Media ==
Oak Ridge is served by a daily newspaper, The Oak Ridger.

For many years, Oak Ridge was the home of AM radio station WATO. WATO's call letters were chosen as the first three letters in "Atomic City" (one of the city's nicknames).

== Notable people ==
Notable persons who were born or lived in Oak Ridge:

- Arnold Anderson, chemical engineer on Manhattan Project, consultant for American Indian Policy Review Commission and founder of American Indian Science and Engineering Society
- E. Riley Anderson, Tennessee Supreme Court justice
- Jennifer Azzi, WNBA player, coach, and Olympic gold medalist
- General B.B. Bell, retired general, commander of U.S. Forces Korea and previously of U.S. Army, Europe and NATO's Joint Command
- Manson Benedict, nuclear engineering pioneer
- A. Keith Bissell, member of Tennessee House of Representatives and chairman of Tennessee Public Service Commission
- Jane Blankenship, spectroscopist
- Mike Caldwell, NFL player and coach
- Nikki Caldwell Fargas, president of the Las Vegas Aces of the WNBA and previously women's basketball head coach for LSU
- Paulo Campos, Filipino physician and educator, was dubbed as "The Father of Nuclear Medicine in the Philippines", conferred the rank and title of National Scientist of the Philippines
- Kenneth Lee Carder, United Methodist Church bishop
- Lee Clayton, country-rock singer/songwriter
- Waldo Cohn, biochemist
- Charles Counts, artist, potter, and author
- Trae Crowder, comedian and author
- Sheldon Datz, chemist
- Dean Dillon, songwriter in the Country Music Hall of Fame
- Charlie Ergen, businessman, co-founder and CEO of EchoStar Communications Corporation
- Megan Fox, actress
- Matthew Friedman, film editor
- Jeannine Hall Gailey, author
- John H. (Jack) Gibbons, director of Office of Technology Assessment and White House Office of Science and Technology Policy
- Eugene Guth, physicist
- Elaine Hendrix, actress
- Tee Higgins, NFL player
- Alexander Hollaender, researcher in radiation biology, 1983 recipient of the Enrico Fermi Award
- Otis Howard, NBA player
- Alston Scott Householder, mathematician who invented Householder transformation
- Mary Gaulden Jagger, radiation geneticist, helped lead the desegregation movement in Anderson County
- Kathy Johnson, gymnast
- Gene Kimmelman, consumer advocate and attorney
- Kai-Fu Lee, Google executive
- Doug Martin, football coach
- Thomas Mason, physicist and director of Oak Ridge National Laboratory
- Matt McMahon, basketball head coach
- Randy McNally, Tennessee Lieutenant Governor
- John O. Merrill, architect
- Edgar Meyer, Grammy Award-winning bassist
- Sarah Monette, author
- Karl Z. Morgan, health physicist at the Oak Ridge site of the Manhattan Project
- Witold Nazarewicz, nuclear physicist, researcher, and educator, John A. Hannah Distinguished Professor in Physics and Chief Scientist at the Facility for Rare Isotope Beams (FRIB) and the Department of Physics and Astronomy at Michigan State University, and a Professor at the University of Warsaw, Faculty of Physics, Institute of Theoretical Physics
- Clarice Phelps, nuclear chemist
- Ward Plummer, physicist
- William G. Pollard, nuclear physicist, author, and Episcopal priest
- Herman Postma, physicist and former director of the Oak Ridge National Laboratory
- Ellen Reid, Pulitzer Prize-winning composer
- Bobby Richards, NFL player
- Mitch Rouse, actor, director, and screenwriter
- Danny Sanders, football player
- Sophia Schubert, golfer
- Cameron Sexton, Tennessee state representative and Speaker of the State House
- William Shepherd, astronaut, commander of Expedition 1, first crew on International Space Station
- Clifford Shull, Nobel Prize-winning physicist
- Louis Slotin, physicist and chemist
- Gore Verbinski, film director of Pirates of the Caribbean series
- Muse Watson, American actor
- Alvin Weinberg, nuclear physicist, director of the Oak Ridge National Laboratory, 1955–1974
- Ed Westcott, photographer, the Manhattan Project
- Richard White, actor
- Eugene Wigner, Nobel Prize-winning physicist, founding director of the Oak Ridge National Laboratory
- Adam Wingard, director
- Herbert York, nuclear physicist

== Sister cities ==
Oak Ridge has two sister cities, as designated by Sister Cities International:

- Naka, Japan
- Obninsk, Russia
