= Oak Ridge History Museum =

History museum in Oak Ridge, Tennessee, US

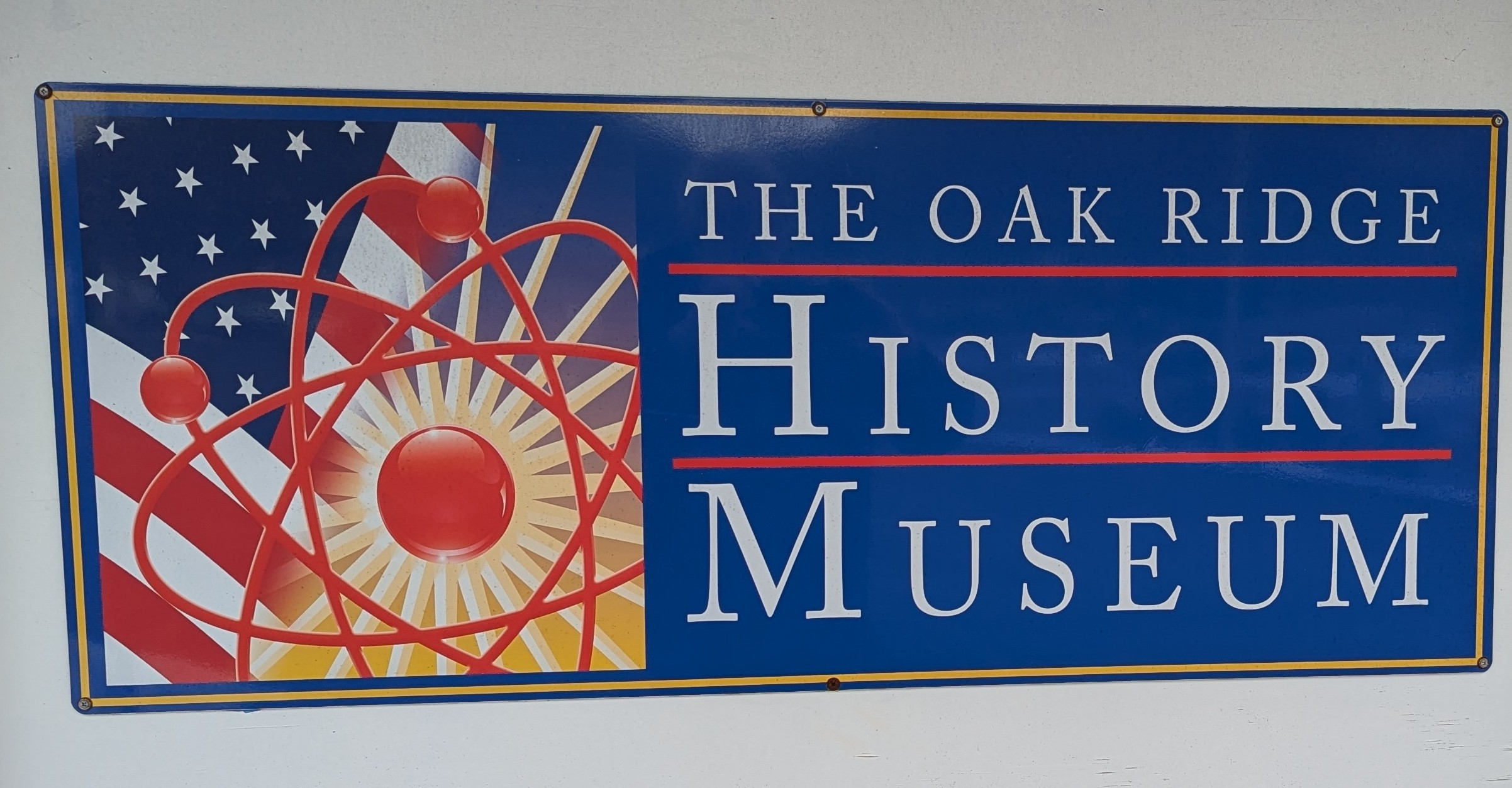

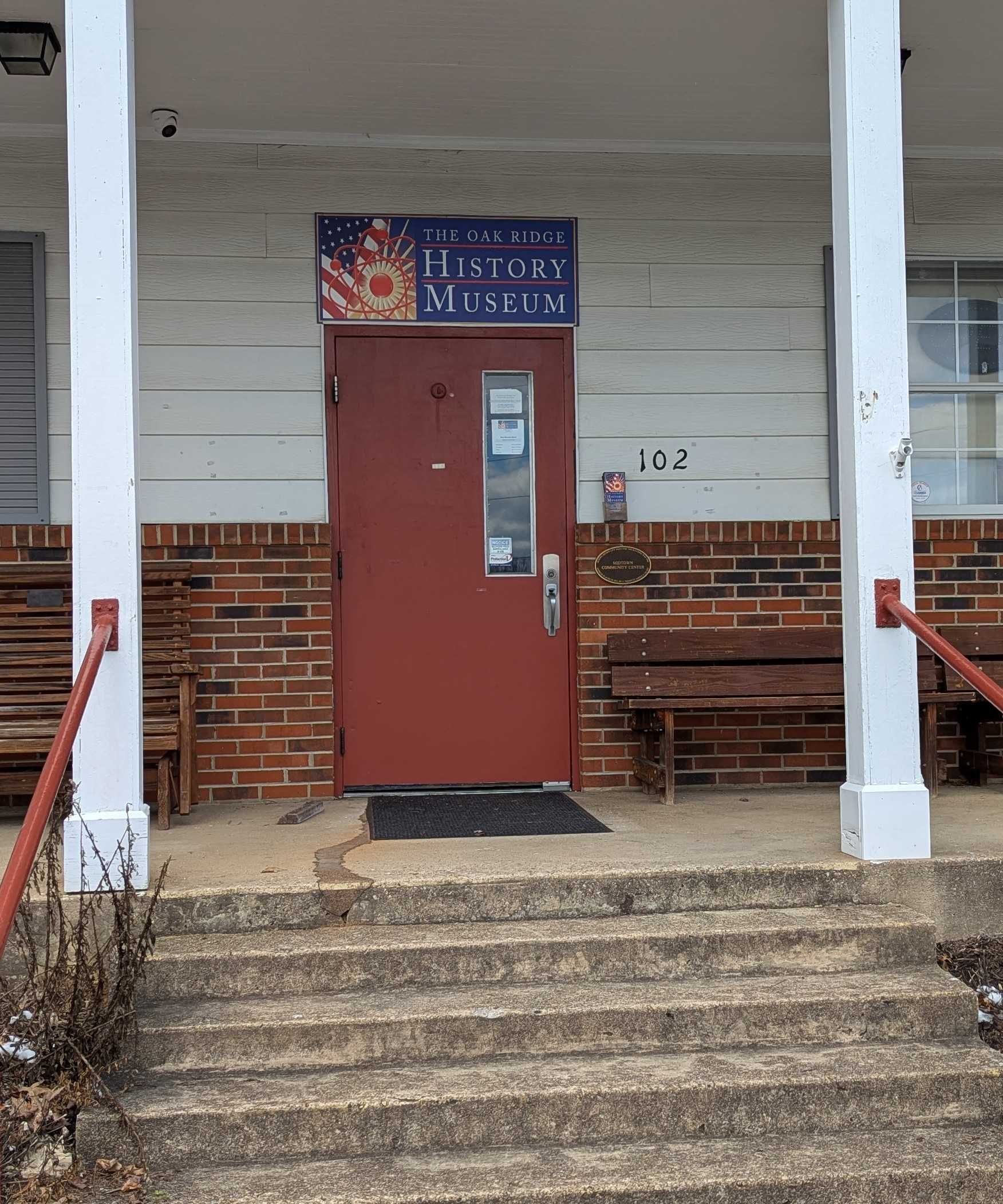
- Established: 2019
- Location: 102 Robertsville Road, Oak Ridge, Tennessee
- Coordinates: 36°00′46″N 84°15′55″W
- Type: History museum
- Chairpersons: Betty and Lloyd Stokes
- Website: oakridgehistorymuseum.com

The Oak Ridge History Museum is a history museum in Oak Ridge, Tennessee. Its mission is to document the social impact on Oak Ridge from its role in the World War II Manhattan Project. This is in contrast to the nearby American Museum of Science and Energy, which concentrates of the technical aspects of the Manhattan Project in Oak Ridge.

The museum is a member of the Manhattan Project National Historical Park.

== See also ==
- Bradbury Science Museum
- National Atomic Testing Museum
- National Museum of Nuclear Science & History
- American Museum of Science and Energy
