= Economy of Tennessee =

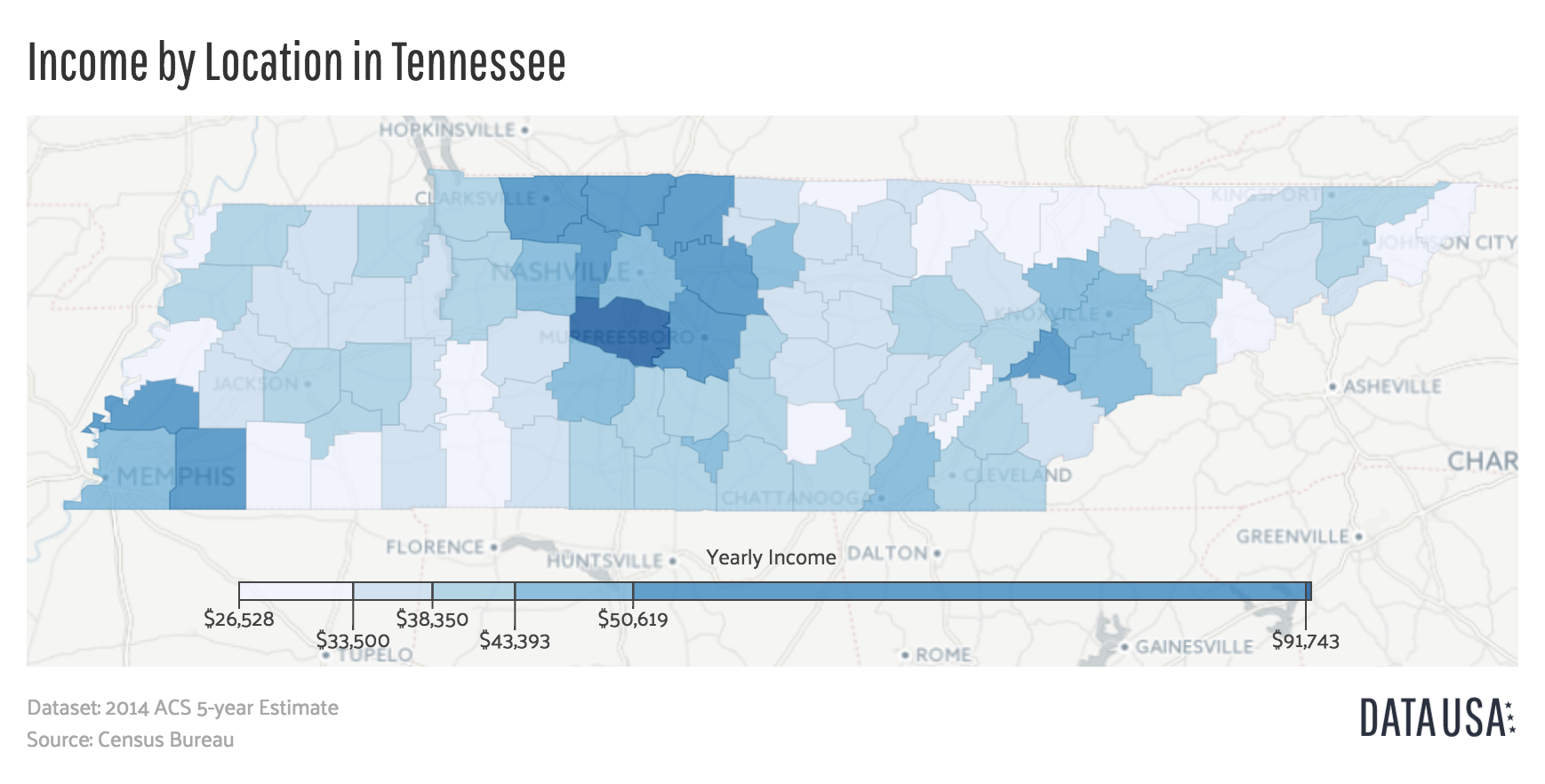
A geomap showing the counties of Tennessee colored by the relative range of that county's median income. Source: 2014 American Community Survey five-year estimate report.

Chart showing poverty in Tennessee, by age and gender (red = female)

The U.S. state of Tennessee contains a diverse economy that is made up of many sectors with a mix of industries including manufacturing, agriculture, healthcare, and tourism. The state is home to several major corporations, including FedEx, the largest courier company in the world, and AutoZone, the largest retailer of auto parts in the United States.

Agriculture is an important part of the economy of Tennessee, with the state ranking among the top producers of soybeans, tobacco, and cotton in the United States. The state is also home to a thriving healthcare industry, with Nashville being a major hub for healthcare services and research. Tourism is another significant contributor to the economy of Tennessee, with millions of visitors each year drawn to the state's natural beauty and cultural attractions, including the Great Smoky Mountains National Park and the Country Music Hall of Fame.

== Economic statistics ==
As of 2020, Tennessee had a gross state product of $364.5 billion. In 2019, the state's per capita personal income was $29,859. The median household income was $58,516 in 2021. About 13.9% percent of the population was below the poverty line. In 2018, the state reported a total employment of 2,683,214, and a total number of 138,269 employer establishments.

For 2012, the state held an asset surplus of $533 million, one of only eight states in the nation to report a surplus. Tennessee is a right to work state, as are most of its Southern neighbors. Unionization has historically been low and continues to decline as in most of the U.S. generally.

== Taxation ==
Tennessee has a reputation as low-tax state and is usually ranked as one of the five states with the lowest tax burden on residents. It is one of nine states that do not have a general income tax; the sales tax is the primary means of funding the government. The Hall income tax was a tax imposed on most dividends and interest. The tax rate was 6% from 1937 to 2016, but was completely phased out by January 1, 2021. The first $1,250 of individual income and $2,500 of joint income was exempt from this tax.

The state's sales and use tax rate for most items is 7%, the second-highest in the nation, along with Mississippi, Rhode Island, New Jersey, and Indiana. Food is taxed at a lower rate of 4%, but candy, dietary supplements and prepared food are taxed at 7%. Local sales taxes are collected in most jurisdictions at rates varying from 1.5% to 2.75%, bringing the total sales tax to between 8.5% and 9.75%, with an average rate of about 9.5%, the nation's highest average sales tax. Intangible property tax is assessed on the shares of stock of stockholders of any loan, investment, insurance, or for-profit cemetery companies. The assessment ratio is 40% of the value times the jurisdiction's tax rate. Since January 1, 2016, Tennessee has had no inheritance tax.

While the sales tax remains the main source of state government funding, property taxes are the primary source of revenue for local governments.

== Agriculture ==
Tennessee has the eighth-most farms in the nation, which cover more than 40% of the state's land area, and have an average size of about 155 acres (0.63 km^{2}). Cash receipts for crops and livestock have an estimated annual value of $3.5 billion, and the agriculture sector has an estimated annual impact of $81 billion on the state's economy.

Beef cattle is the state's largest agricultural commodity. Tennessee ranks 12th in the nation for the number of heads of cattle, with more than half of the state's farmland dedicated to cattle grazing. Soybeans are the most common crop produced in the state, followed by corn and cotton. Most soybeans in Tennessee are grown in West and Middle Tennessee, especially in the northwestern corner of the state. Broilers and poultry constitute the state's second most common livestock commodity.

Although cotton was an early crop in Tennessee, large-scale cultivation of the fiber did not begin until the 1820s with the opening of the fertile soils and level plains of West Tennessee for European settlement. Today, Tennessee ranks seventh overall in the nation in cotton production, most of which is still grown in the western part of the state. Tennessee has been one of the top tobacco-producing states for most of its history, which is predominantly grown in the Ridge-and-Valley region of East Tennessee, and still ranks fourth nationwide. Springfield, Tennessee is known for its dark fired tobacco. The state is also the sixth-largest producer of tomatoes, with Grainger County being recognized as one of the top tomato-producing communities in the nation. Other important cash crops raised in the state include hay, wheat, eggs, and snap beans.

The Nashville Basin is a top equestrian region, due to soils that produce grass ideal for feeding horses. The Tennessee Walking Horse, first bred in the region in the late 18th century, is one of the most recognized horse breeds in the world. The state also ranks second nationwide for mule breeding and the production of goat meat.

Horticultural products are an important aspect of the economy of the Eastern Highland Rim, particularly in Warren County, which is nicknamed the "Nursery Capitol of the World". Forests cover more than half of Tennessee's land area, but the state's timber industry is largely concentrated on the Cumberland Plateau, which ranks as one of the top producers of hardwood nationwide.

== Industry and manufacturing ==
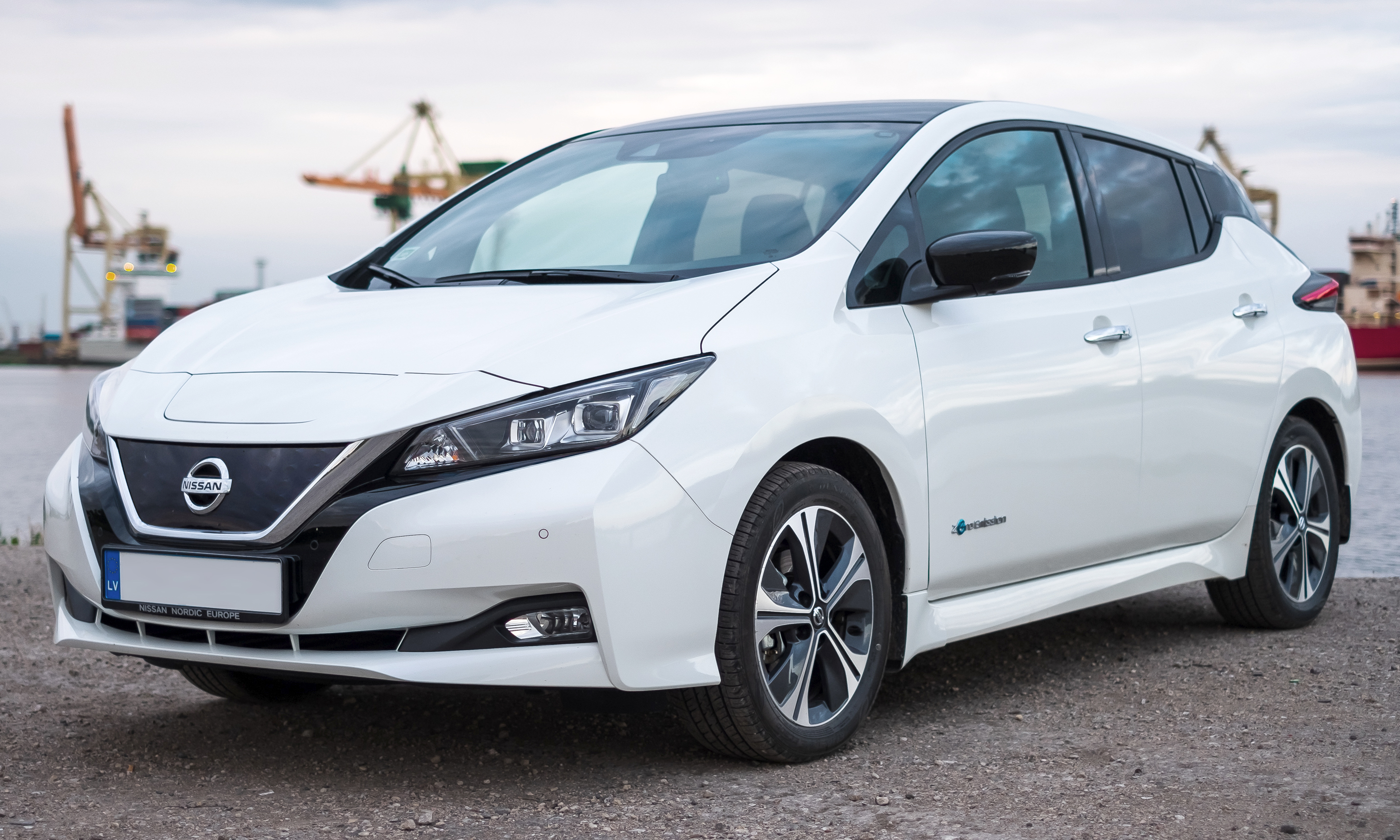
A Nissan Leaf, one of six models manufactured at the Nissan Smyrna Assembly Plant, the largest automotive assembly plant in North America

Until World War II, Tennessee, like most Southern states, remained predominantly agrarian. But Chattanooga became one of the first industrial cities in the south in the decades following the Civil War, when many factories, including iron foundries, steel mills, and textile mills were constructed there. Most of Tennessee's industrial growth, however, began with the federal investments in the Tennessee Valley Authority and the Manhattan Project in the 1930s and 1940s. The state's industrial and manufacturing sector continued to rapidly expand in the succeeding decades, and Tennessee is now home to more than 2,400 advanced manufacturing establishments, which produce a total of more than $29 billion worth of goods annually. Today, Tennessee's top manufacturing outputs include automotive and transportation products, processed foods and drinks, chemicals, electrical equipment and appliances, and fabricated metals, and machinery.

Since the early 1980s, Tennessee has emerged as a major hub for the automotive industry, which is now the largest manufacturing sector in the state. Nissan's assembly plant in Smyrna, is the largest automotive assembly plant in North America. Three other auto manufacturers have assembly plants in Tennessee: General Motors in Spring Hill, Van Hool in Morristown, and Volkswagen in Chattanooga. Ford is constructing an assembly plant in Stanton that is expected to be operational in 2025, and Mullen Technologies is constructing a plant in Memphis. In addition, the state is home to more than 900 automotive suppliers. Nissan moved its North American corporate headquarters from California to Franklin in 2005, and Mitsubishi Motors did the same in 2019.

Food and drink production has also been an important industry in Tennessee since the late 19th century, and is today the second largest manufacturing sector. The world's first Coca-Cola bottling plant opened in Chattanooga in 1899. Other well-known brands produced in the state include Jack Daniel's, George Dickel, Mountain Dew, Mayfield, Goo Goo Cluster, Moon Pie, Bush's Beans, Little Debbie, M&M's, and Pringles.

Tennessee is one of the top producers of chemicals, especially non-petrochemicals. Chemical products manufactured in Tennessee include industrial chemicals, paints, pharmaceuticals, plastic resins, and soaps and hygiene products. Kingsport is the headquarters of Eastman Chemical Company, which was founded there in 1920. Other important chemical manufacturers include Matheson in New Johnsonville, Wacker Chemie and Olin Corporation in Bradley County, Resolute Forest Products in Calhoun, and Hemlock Semiconductor in Clarksville.

Tennessee is also one of the top states where consumer electronics, electrical appliances, and other electrical equipment historically have been produced, including brands such as Monogram Refrigeration, Whirlpool, Thomas & Betts, LG Electronics, Magnavox, and Electrolux. Other major products manufactured in the state include nonelectrical machinery and fabricated metal products.

== Business ==
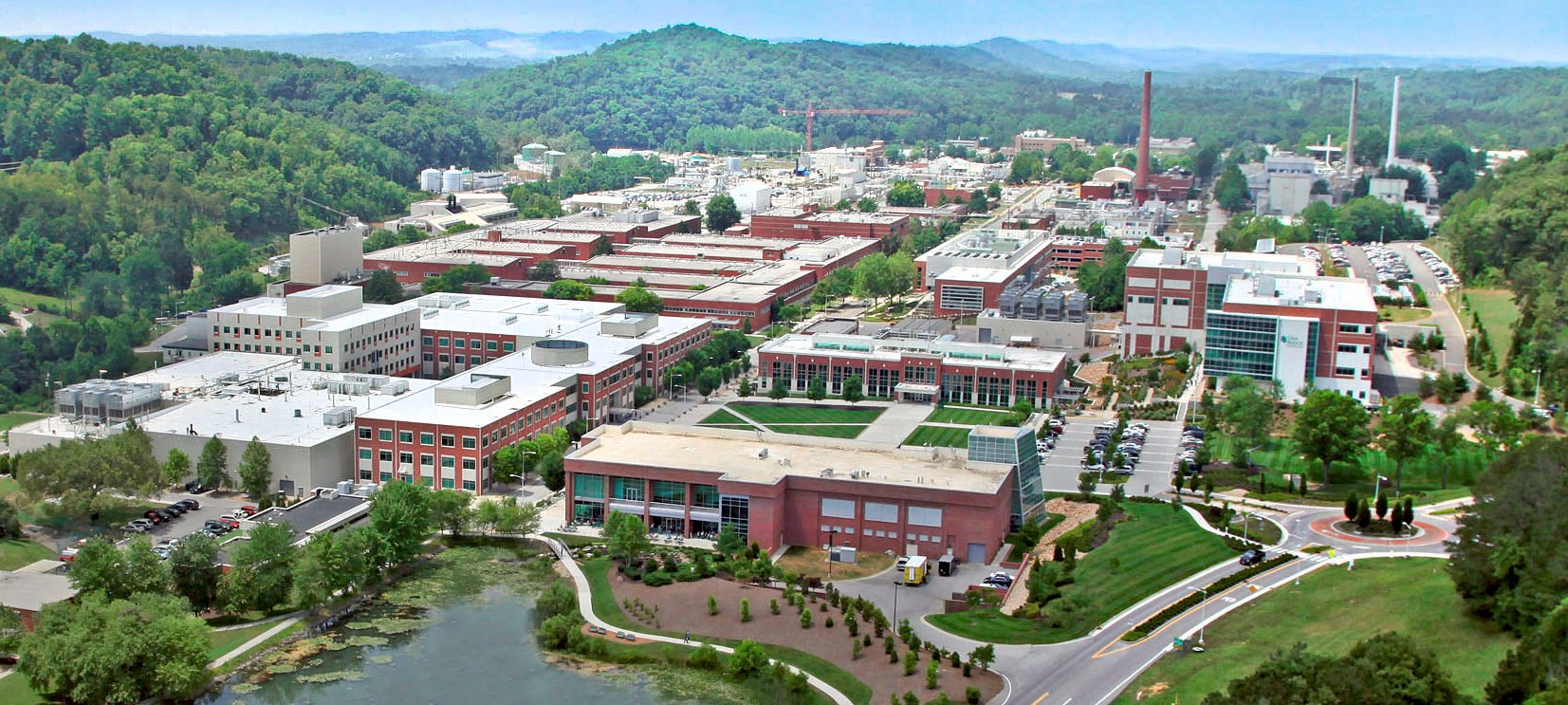
Established in 1942, Oak Ridge National Laboratory is the largest national laboratory in the Department of Energy system.

Tennessee's commercial sector is dominated by a wide variety of companies, but its largest service industries include health care, transportation, music and entertainment, banking, and finance. Large corporations with headquarters in Tennessee include FedEx, AutoZone, International Paper, and First Horizon Corporation, all based in Memphis; Pilot Corporation and Regal Entertainment Group in Knoxville; Hospital Corporation of America and Caterpillar Inc., based in Nashville; Unum in Chattanooga; Acadia Senior Living and Community Health Systems in Franklin; Dollar General in Goodlettsville, and LifePoint Health, Tractor Supply Company, and Delek US in Brentwood.

== Technology ==
The research and development industry in Tennessee is also one of the largest employment sectors, mainly due to the prominence of Oak Ridge National Laboratory (ORNL) and the Y-12 National Security Complex in the city of Oak Ridge. ORNL conducts scientific research in materials science, nuclear physics, energy, high-performance computing, systems biology, and national security. It is also the largest national laboratory in the Department of Energy (DOE) system by size, and has the third highest budget. Since the 1990s, the geographical area between Oak Ridge and Knoxville has been known as the Tennessee Technology Corridor, with more than 500 high-tech firms located in the region. The technology sector is also a rapidly growing industry in Middle Tennessee, particularly in the Nashville metropolitan area. In 2018, Amazon established its East Coast operations center in Nashville, and plans to eventually employ about 5,000.

== Energy and mineral production ==
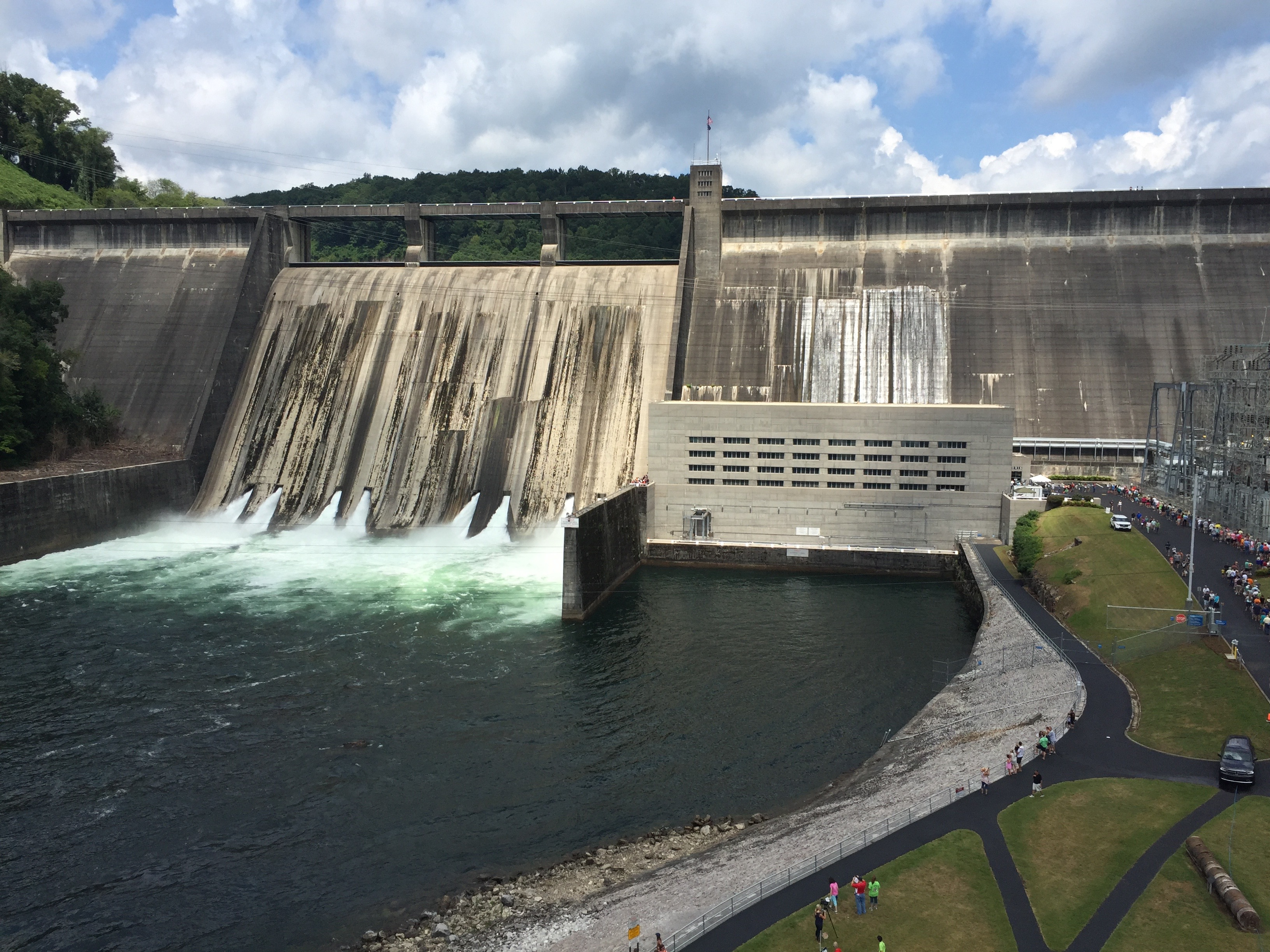
Norris Dam, a hydroelectric dam operated by the Tennessee Valley Authority that was among the first projects the TVA performed as part of the New Deal in 1933

Tennessee's electric utilities are regulated monopolies, as in many other states. As of 2020, the Tennessee Valley Authority owned over 90% of the state's generating capacity. Nuclear power is Tennessee's largest source of electricity generation producing about 47.3% of its power in 2020. The same year, 20.2% of the power was produced from natural gas, 18.4% from coal, 13.4% from hydroelectric power, and 1.6% from other renewables. About 61.3% of the electricity generated in Tennessee produces no greenhouse gas emissions. Tennessee is a net consumer of electricity, receiving power from other TVA facilities in neighboring states, such as the Browns Ferry Nuclear Plant in northern Alabama.

Tennessee is home to the two newest civilian nuclear power reactors in the United States, at Watts Bar Nuclear Plant in Rhea County. Unit 1 began operation in 1996 and Unit 2 in 2016, making it the first and only new nuclear power reactor to begin operation in the United States in the 21st century. As of 2020, officials at Oak Ridge National Laboratory and the TVA are studying advancements in nuclear power as an energy source, including small modular reactors, in a joint effort. Tennessee was also an early leader in hydroelectric power, first with the now defunct Chattanooga and Tennessee Electric Power Company; later, the United States Army Corps of Engineers and the TVA constructed several hydroelectric dams on Tennessee rivers. Tennessee is the third-largest hydroelectric power-producing state east of the Rocky Mountains.

Tennessee has very little petroleum and natural gas reserves, but is home to one oil refinery, in Memphis. Bituminous coal is mined in small quantities in the Cumberland Plateau and Cumberland Mountains. There are sizable reserves of lignite coal in West Tennessee that remain untapped. Coal production in Tennessee peaked in 1972, and today less than 0.1% of coal production in the United States comes from Tennessee mines.

Tennessee is the nation's leading producer of ball clay. Other major mineral products produced in Tennessee include sand, gravel, crushed stone, Portland cement, marble, sandstone, common clay, lime, and zinc. The Copper Basin, in Tennessee's southeastern corner in Polk County, was one of the nation's most productive copper mining districts between the 1840s and 1980s. Mines in the basin supplied about 90% of the copper the Confederacy used during the Civil War, and also marketed chemical byproducts of the mining, including sulfuric acid. Mining activities in the basin resulted in a major environmental disaster, which left the landscape in the basin barren for more than a century. Iron ore was another major mineral mined in Tennessee until the early 20th century. Tennessee was also a top producer of phosphate until the early 1990s.

== Tourism ==
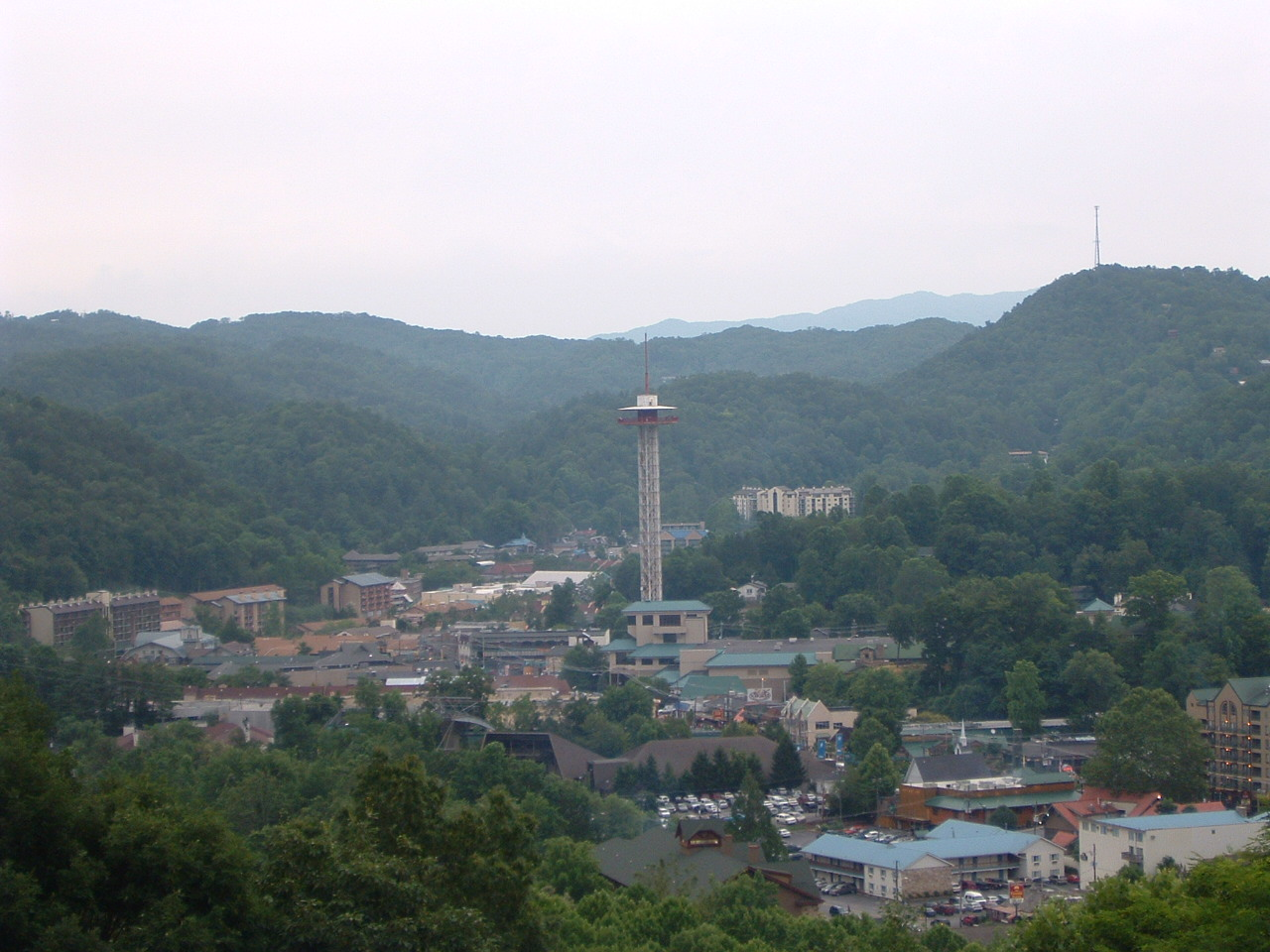
The resort city of Gatlinburg borders the Great Smoky Mountains National Park, which is the most visited national park in the United States.

Tourism contributes billions of dollars every year to Tennessee's economy, and it is the 11th-most visited state in the nation. In 2019 a record 126 million people visited the state, up from 119 million the previous year. This resulted in $23.3 billion of tourism-related spending in the state, approximately $1.1 billion of which came from international travelers. Tax revenue from tourism totaled $1.92 billion. Each county saw at least a $1 million economic impact from tourism, while 21 counties received at least $100 million, and five (Davidson, Shelby, Sevier, Knox, and Hamilton) received more than $1 billion. Tourism-related jobs in the state reached 195,000.

Tennessee is home to the Great Smoky Mountains National Park, the most visited national park in the U.S., with more than 12 million visitors annually. The park anchors a large tourism industry based primarily in nearby Gatlinburg and Pigeon Forge, which consists of such attractions as Dollywood, the most visited ticketed attraction in Tennessee, Ober Gatlinburg, and Ripley's Aquarium of the Smokies. Major attractions in Memphis include Graceland, the home of Elvis Presley, Beale Street, the National Civil Rights Museum, the Memphis Zoo, and the Stax Museum of American Soul Music. Nashville contains many attractions related to its musical heritage, including Lower Broadway, the Country Music Hall of Fame, the Ryman Auditorium, Grand Ole Opry, and the Gaylord Opryland Resort. Other major attractions in Nashville include the Tennessee State Museum, The Parthenon, and the Belle Meade Plantation. Major attractions in Chattanooga include Lookout Mountain, the Chattanooga Choo-Choo Hotel, Ruby Falls, and the Tennessee Aquarium, the largest freshwater aquarium in the United States. Other attractions include the American Museum of Science and Energy in Oak Ridge, the Bristol Motor Speedway in Bristol, Jack Daniel's Distillery in Lynchburg, and the Hiwassee and Ocoee rivers in Polk County.

Four Civil War battlefields in Tennessee are preserved by the National Park Service: Chickamauga and Chattanooga National Military Park, Stones River National Battlefield, Shiloh National Military Park, and Fort Donelson National Battlefield. Big South Fork National River and Recreation Area is within the Cumberland Mountains in northeastern Tennessee. Other major historical attractions preserved by the National Park Service include Cumberland Gap National Historical Park, Overmountain Victory National Historic Trail, Trail of Tears National Historic Trail, and the Manhattan Project National Historical Park. Tennessee is home to eight National Scenic Byways, including the Natchez Trace Parkway, the East Tennessee Crossing Byway, the Great River Road, the Norris Freeway, Cumberland National Scenic Byway, Sequatchie Valley Scenic Byway, The Trace, and the Cherohala Skyway. Tennessee maintains 45 state parks, covering some 132,000 acres (530 km^{2}). Many reservoirs the TVA created to generate electricity have also created water-based tourist attractions and real estate development with an estimated $12 billion economic impact based on a 2016 study by the University of Tennessee Institute of Agriculture.
