= NATM (disambiguation) =

NATM usually refers to the New Austrian Tunnelling method.

NATM may also refer to:

- National Atomic Testing Museum in Las Vegas, Nevada, United States
- Not Another Teen Movie, a 2001 film
- Night at the Museum, a 2006 film
