= Katrina Groth =

American mechanical engineer and professor (born 1982)

- Born: 1982 (age 43–44)
- Education: University of Maryland (BS), (MS), (PhD)
- Occupations: Engineer; professor
- Title: Associate Professor
- Scientific career
- Workplaces: University of Maryland; Sandia National Laboratories
- Thesis: A data-informed model of performance shaping factors and their interdependencies for use in human reliability analysis (2009)
- Website: enme.umd.edu/clark/faculty/807/Katrina-Groth

Katrina Groth (born 1982) is an American mechanical engineer and professor. Groth is an associate professor in Mechanical Engineering at the University of Maryland, College Park, where she is the associate director for research for the Center for Risk and Reliability and the director of the Systems Risk and Reliability Analysis lab (SyRRA). Groth previously served as the Principal Research & Development Engineer at Sandia National Laboratories.

== Biography ==
Groth received a Bachelor of Science in Nuclear Engineering from the University of Maryland in 2004. She received a Master of Science in Reliability Engineering in 2008 and a Ph.D. in Reliability Engineering in 2009, both from the University of Maryland.

From 2009 to 2017, Groth worked for the Sandia National Laboratories. While working at Sandia, Groth developed Hydrogen Plus Other Alternative Fuels Risk Assessment Models (HyRAM+), a software toolkit integrating publicly available hydrogen storage data and models. HyRAM+ was used to develop both the American and international safety standards for hydrogen fueling stations—NFPA 2 and ISO 19880–1.

In 2017, Groth joined the University of Maryland's School of Engineering. There, Groth is the associate director of the Center for Risk & Reliability. Groth is also the director of the Systems Risk & Reliability Analysis (SyRRA) laboratory.

In 2021, Groth received the NSF CAREER award for Modernizing Risk Assessment Through Systematic Integration of Probabilistic Risk Assessment (PRA) and Prognostics and Health Management (PHM).

Groth serves on the board of the National Museum of Nuclear Science & History.

== Honors and awards ==
- Mid-Career Award, Fundamental & Applied Research, Catalyzing Energy Education & Excellence (C3E) Initiative, 2025
- Junior Faculty Outstanding Research Award, A. James Clark School of Engineering, 2024
- Landis Young Member Engineering Achievement Award, American Nuclear Society, 2022
- Early Career Distinguished Alumni, A. James Clark School of Engineering, 2022
- CAREER Award, National Science Foundation, 2021
- David Okrent Award for Nuclear Safety, American Nuclear Society, 2021
- United States Department of Energy Hydrogen Program Safety, Codes, and Standards Award, 2016
- Robert Schefer Memorial Best Paper Award, 2015

== Notable works ==
- Chapter 15 - Hydrogen safety, risk, and reliability analysis
- A data-informed PIF hierarchy for model-based Human Reliability Analysis
- Bridging the gap between HRA research and HRA practice: A Bayesian network version of SPAR-H
- Deriving causal Bayesian networks from human reliability analysis data: A methodology and example model
- HyRAM: A methodology and toolkit for quantitative risk assessment of hydrogen systems
- Hydrogen storage and delivery: Review of the state of the art technologies and risk and reliability analysis
