= National Museum of Nuclear Science & History =

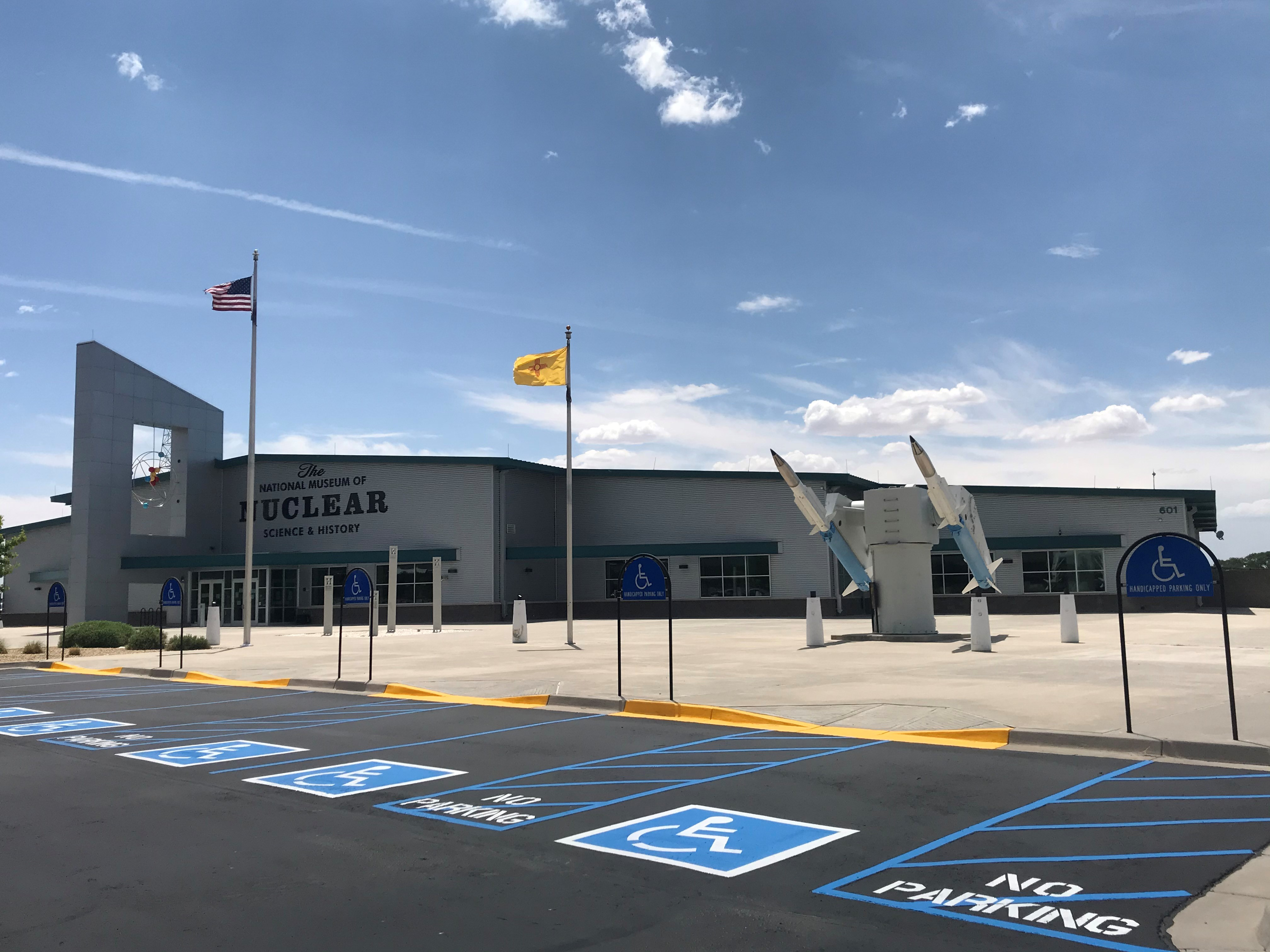
- Former names: Sandia Atomic Museum; National Atomic Museum
- Established: 1969
- Location: 601 Eubank Blvd SE, Albuquerque, NM 87123
- Coordinates: 35.0660°N 106.5339°W
- Type: Atomic History and Science museum
- Accreditation: American Alliance of Museums
- Visitors: 68,978 (2023)
- Executive director: Jennifer Hayden
- Curator: James Stemm
- Employees: 25
- Public transit access: Central @ Eubank (ART)
- Parking: On-site (no charge)
- Website: nuclearmuseum.org

The National Museum of Nuclear Science & History (formerly named National Atomic Museum) is a national repository of nuclear science and weapons materials chartered by the 102nd United States Congress under Public Law 102-190. It is located in unincorporated Bernalillo County, New Mexico, with an Albuquerque postal address; specifically, the Museum is in the Sandia Science and Technology Park which is near Sandia National Laboratories; the Albuquerque city limit; and Kirtland Air Force Base.

"The mission of the National Atomic Museum is to serve as America's resource for nuclear history and science. The museum presents exhibits and quality educational programs that convey the diversity of individuals and events that shape the historical and technical context of the nuclear age."

== History ==
A PGM-11 Redstone rocket on display at its current location.

The museum was initially sited in 1969 on the grounds of Sandia Base (now Kirtland Air Force Base) in an old 90 mm anti-aircraft gun repair facility, and named "Sandia Atomic Museum". It was the result of a six-year effort to establish a museum focused on nuclear weapons. The Museum was intended to build better relationships between the public and the military and to focus on nuclear weapons and their contributions to American national power. It was staffed by United States Air Force (USAF) personnel with help from Sandia National Laboratories (SNL). In 1973, the museum's name changed to "National Atomic Museum", but it did not yet have a national charter.

The Energy Research and Development Administration, in 1976, took over ownership and operation of the National Atomic Museum from Field Command, Defense Nuclear Agency. The Museum, with an "operating figure" of $100,000 and approximately four paid staff, had been threatened with closure as a result of budget cuts.

In 1985, the United States Department of Energy (DOE) became responsible for the museum, and the staff became DOE employees. In 1991 the museum received its charter as a national museum, and its mission expanded to include aspects of nuclear science and history beyond manufacturing nuclear weapons. The museum also became affiliated with the Smithsonian Institution. In 1992 the National Atomic Museum Foundation (NAMF) was a non-profit organization created to run and fund the museum and reduce the financial burden on taxpayers. DOE transferred the museum operation to SNL in 1995, and Museum staff became SNL employees.

After the terror attacks in September 2001, increased security restricted public access to the museum's on-base site and forced relocation to a former REI store in Old Town Albuquerque's museum district. In 2005, SNL transferred operational responsibility to NAMF. SNL employees working as museum staff moved to other positions within Sandia. The museum hired new staff who became employees of NAMF.

When the museum relocated to Albuquerque's museum district, the site had inadequate space for outdoor exhibits. In January 2005, NAMF asked DOE/NNSA (National Nuclear Security Administration) for 12 acres (4.9 hectares) of land at the intersection of Eubank and Southern Boulevards in southeast Albuquerque for construction of a new museum. In October 2006, a formal Land Use Agreement was signed with SNL as Grantor and NAMF as Grantee. The museum broke ground and began construction, with staff documenting its construction project via a blog and a Flickr gallery where photos were posted weekly to show the building's progress.

The new museum opened on April 4, 2009, in its new location under the new name National Museum of Nuclear Science & History.

Funding for construction came from multiple sources, including:

- $5 million in Federal funds for design and construction
- $1 million transferred from the State of New Mexico to the City of Albuquerque for infrastructure
- $2.63 million from corporations
- $25,000 from foundations
- $500,000 from individual contributions

The new facility incorporates 16 permanent indoor exhibit areas, two classrooms, a theater, a combined library and conference room, a gallery for temporary exhibits, and the Museum's store in 30,000 sq ft (0.28 ha). of space. The site provides nine acres (3.6 hectares) of outdoor space for exhibits of military aircraft, missiles, vehicles, and the sail of the USS James K. Polk nuclear submarine.

Museum operating costs of approximately $2.5M annually are provided by NAMF through earned and contributed revenues associated with the operation of the museum from admissions, NAMF memberships, grants, summer camps, events/rentals, and Museum store proceeds. A contract for services between Sandia National Laboratories and NAMF exists as well.

== Exhibits and displays ==
Section source: NMoNSH

The sail of the USS James K. Polk on display in Heritage Park.

The Museum is dedicated to preserving and presenting information about scientific, historical, and cultural aspects of the Atomic Age. Permanent exhibits focus on the following:

A B-29 Superfortress on display.

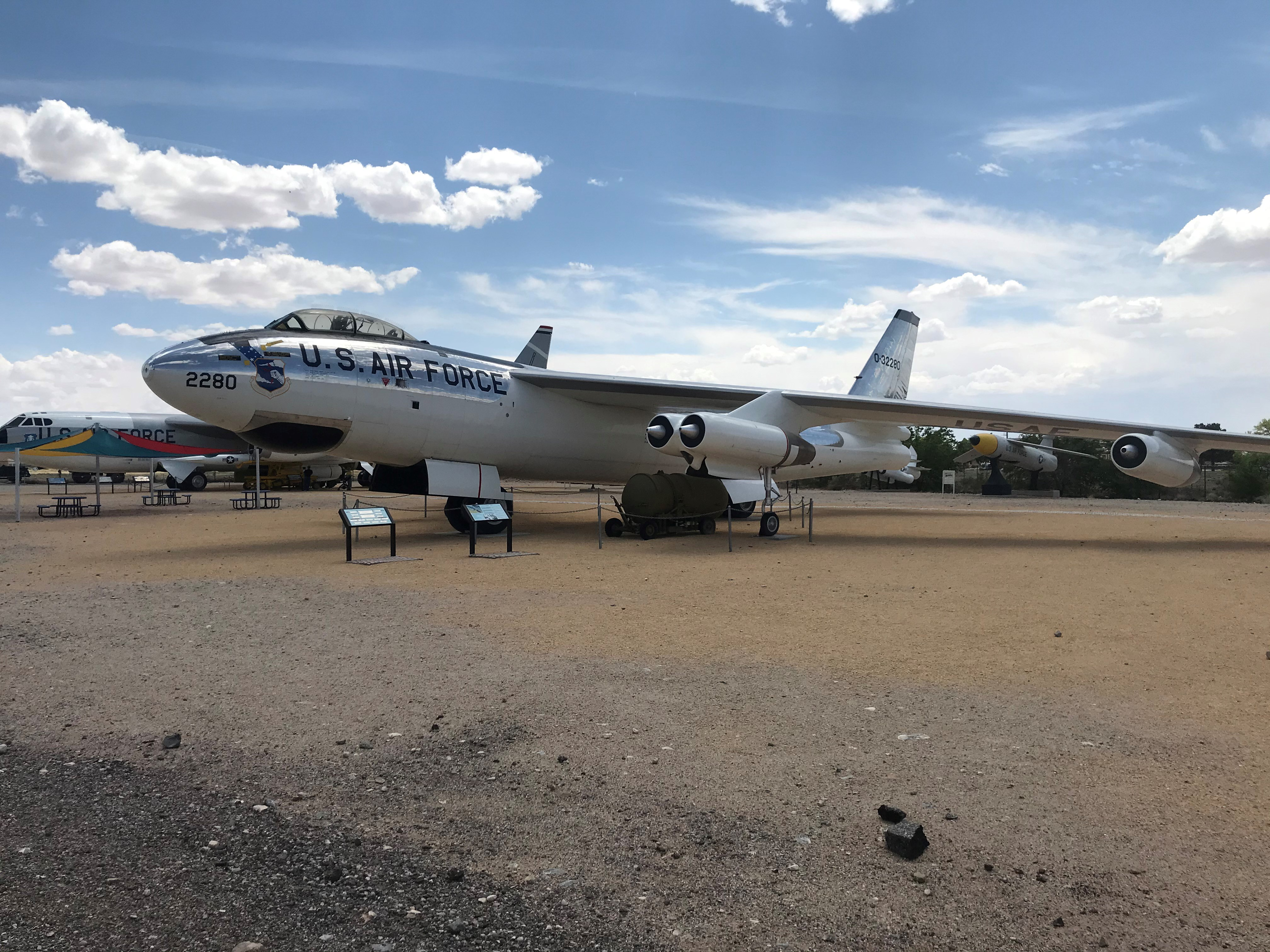
A B-47 Stratojet on display.

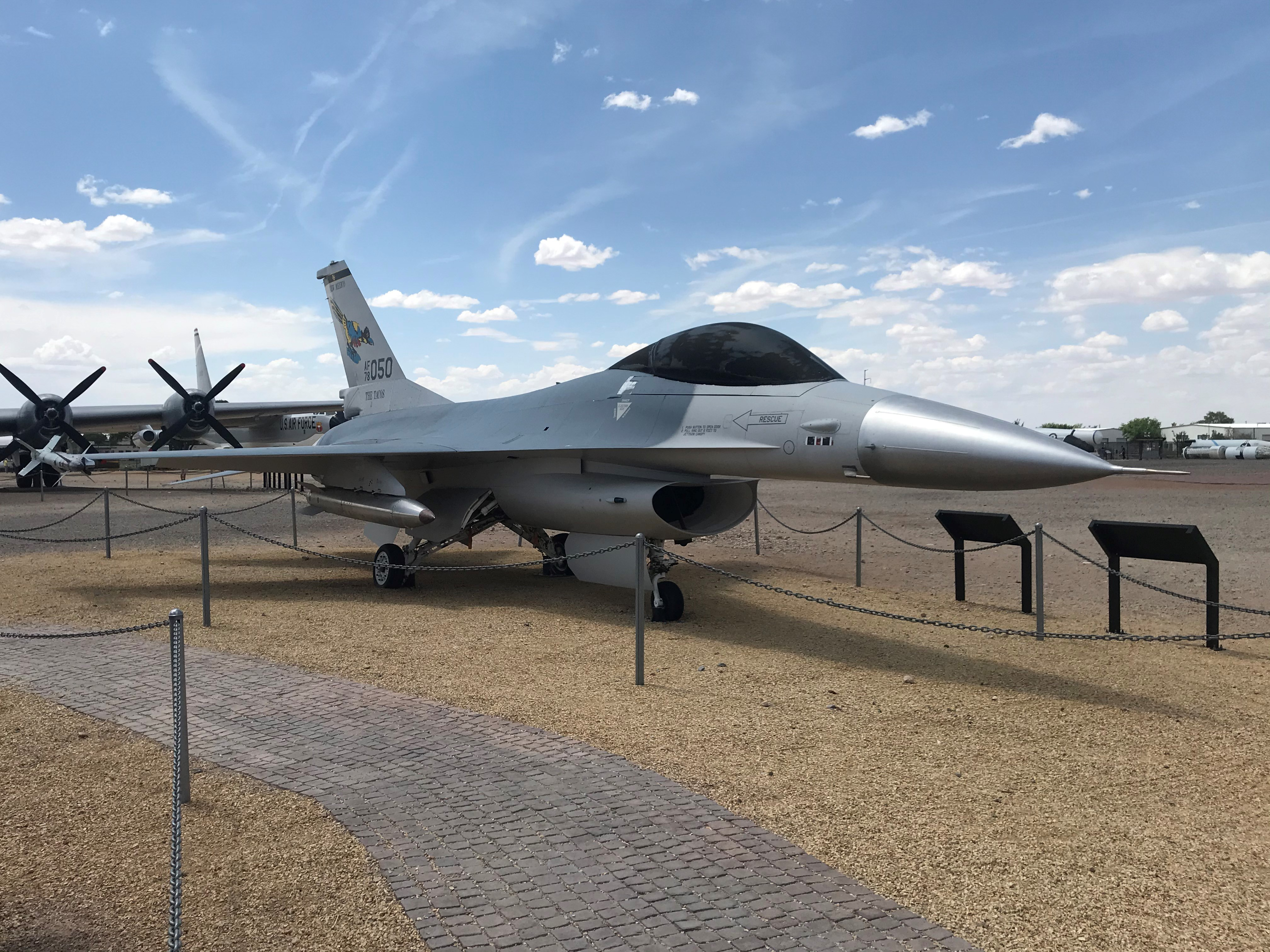
An F-16A on display. Note the simulated B61 bomb under the wing

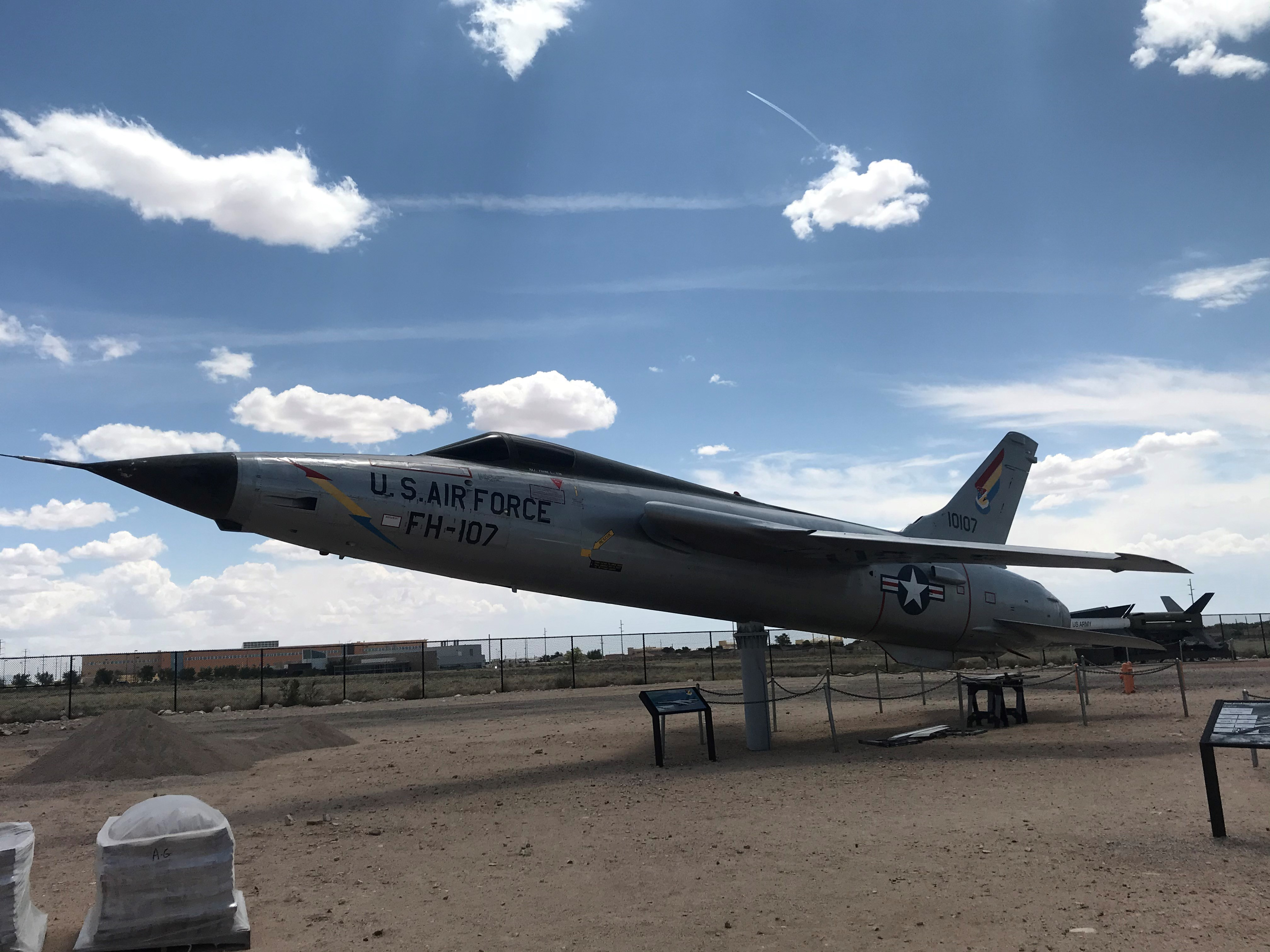
An F-105D Thunderchief on display.

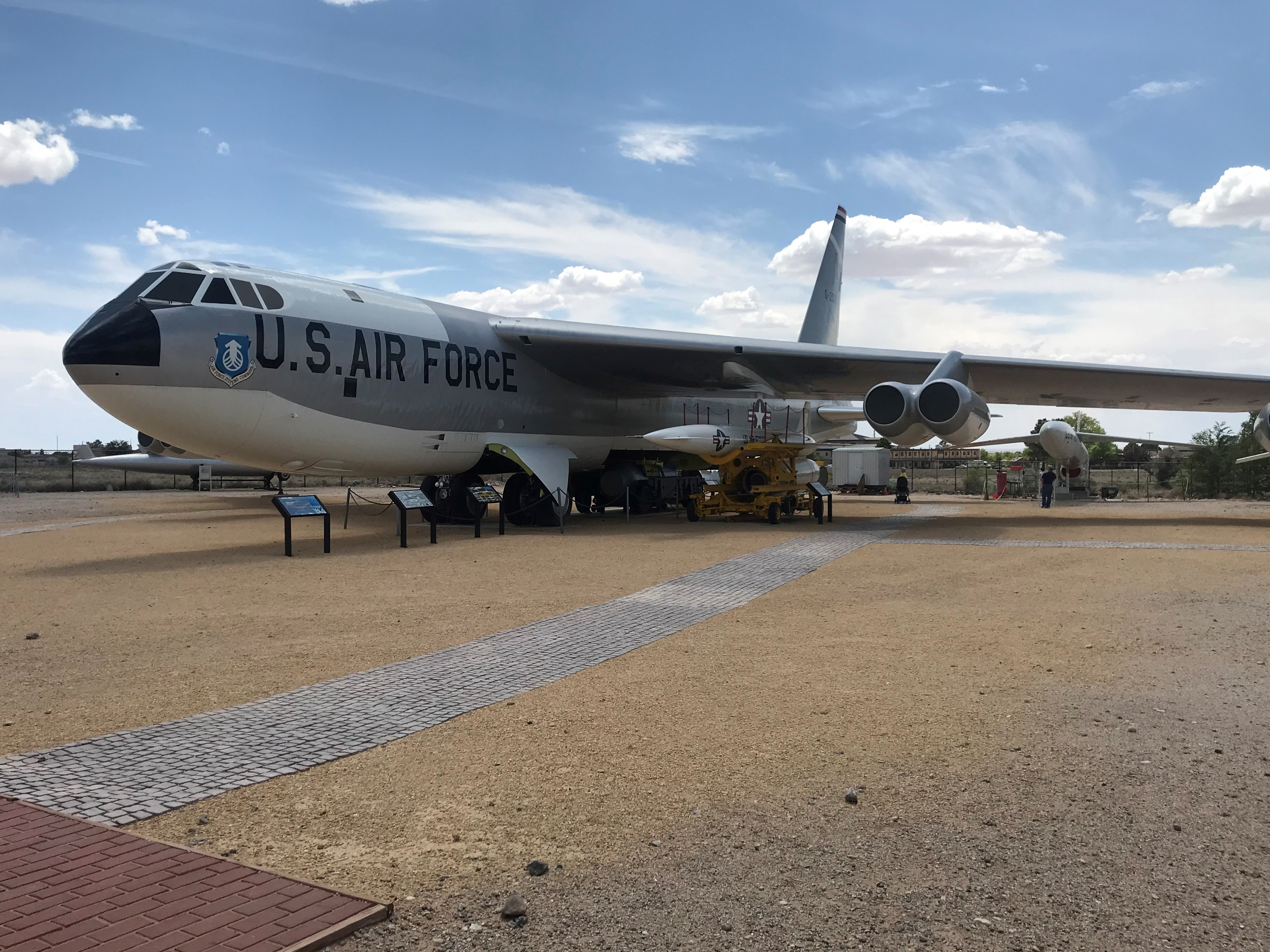
Boeing B-52B on display with AGM-28 Hound Dog under the wing

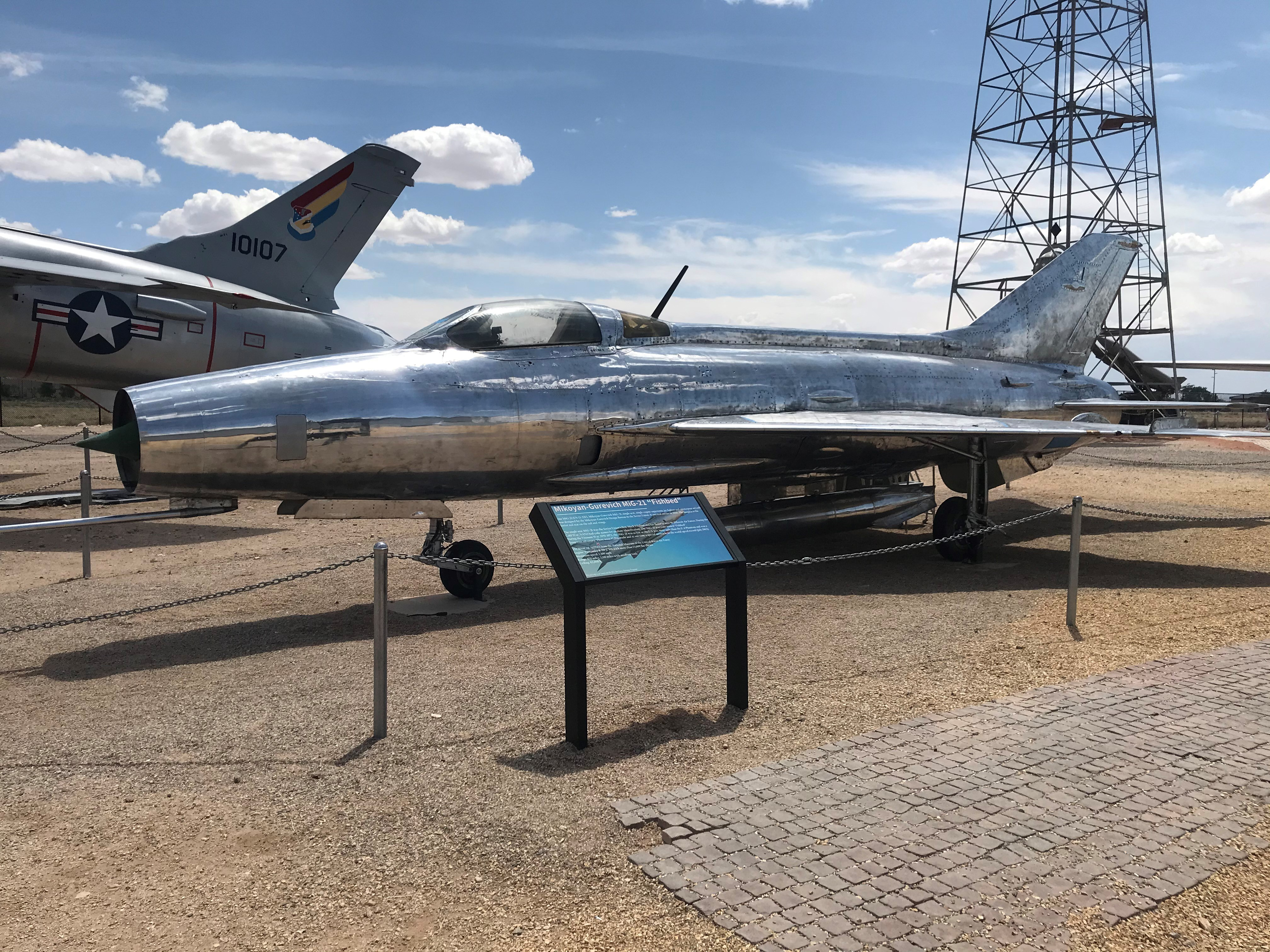
Mig-21 on display.

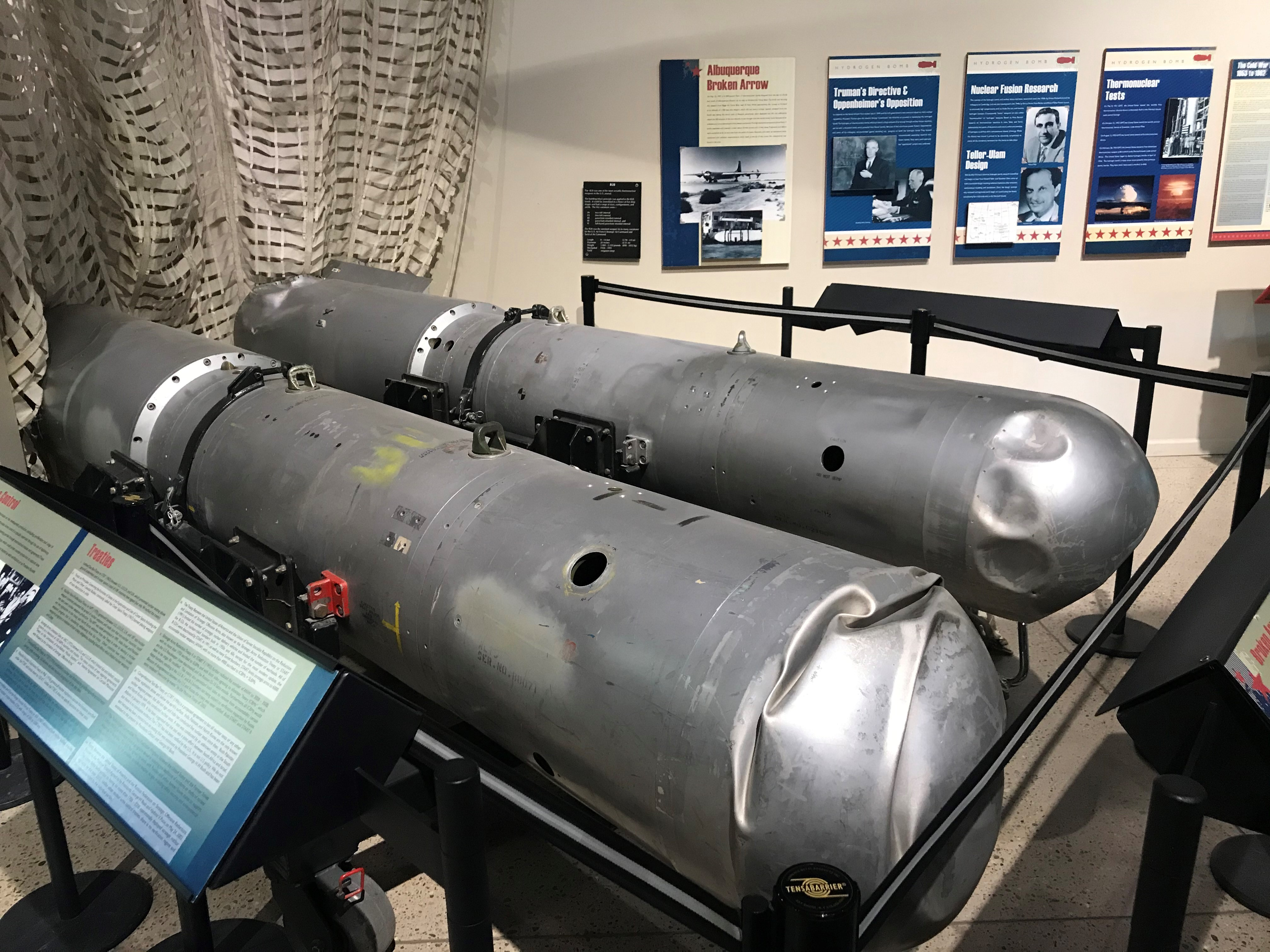
B28 bomb casings recovered after 1966 Palomares B-52 crash.

Pioneers of the Atom – An interactive display that introduces the individuals who questioned and defined the matter which makes up the universe. Visitors can use the interactive kiosk to trace the study of the atom.

World War II – A display that teaches the history leading up to the creation and use of the atomic bomb and the countries that became involved.

Critical Assembly, the Secrets of Los Alamos 1944: An Installation by Jim Sanborn – A special exhibition, staged as a tableau, that recreates the laboratory environment in which the first atomic bomb was assembled. Based on scholarly and eyewitness accounts, this exhibit features many artifacts that would have been (or were actually) present at Los Alamos National Laboratory in the 1940s. (This exhibit replaced "Secrets, Lies & Atomic Spies" in 2017.)

The Decision to Drop – The dawn of the Atomic Age began with the design and testing of the world's first atomic bomb during the Manhattan Project. Visitors are introduced to the daily lives of the scientists who lived at Los Alamos and journey with them to the Trinity site, where the first explosion occurred in 1945. These exhibits include a series of displays striving for an objective examination of the history leading up to and the policy decisions regarding the deployment of the first nuclear weapons code-named Little Boy and Fat Man.

The exhibit includes the text of comments by Manhattan Project staff (including a contentious Edward Teller statement advocating a high-altitude night-time demonstration detonation over Tokyo to precipitate Japanese surrender), the text of statements by Japanese politicians and military leaders, a copy of the petition protesting use without warning submitted by nuclear physicist Leó Szilárd, and photographs from the Hiroshima Peace Memorial Museum. The display also features video footage of the reminiscences of Col. Paul Tibbets (pilot of the Enola Gay, the B-29 bomber that dropped the atomic bomb on Hiroshima, Japan), and coverage of the emotion the surrender of Japan produced in the United States.

Hiroshima and Nagasaki – This exhibit pays tribute to the people affected by the detonation of the atomic weapons that the Manhattan Project developed. This exhibit features images of these cities before, during, and after the bombings and representations of the commitment to peace that these communities continue to uphold today.

Cold War – An examination of the strategic conflict between the United States and the USSR in the second half of the 20th century, through US nuclear testing in the Marshall Islands and at the Nevada Test Site, Soviet nuclear development, the October 1962 Cuban Missile Crisis, and leading to the eventual collapse of the Soviet Union. This also includes the Palomares exhibition, an extensive accounting of the January 17, 1966 Palomares B-52 crash – a mid-air collision between two USAF aircraft (a B-52 bomber and a KC-135 tanker) over Palomares, Almería, resulting in radioactive contamination following the accidental dropping of four hydrogen bombs.

Heritage Park – This 9-acre outdoor exhibit is complete with planes, rockets, missiles, cannons, and a nuclear submarine sail.

Nuclear Medicine – A display of early and modern medical equipment using nuclear physics principles.

Little Albert's Lab – An area presided over by an animatronic version of Albert Einstein, provides hands-on, family-friendly science activities for children.

Nano – An interactive exhibition where visitors can imagine and discover a world they cannot see and learn about big ideas from the small nanoscience world. (This display is now part of Little Albert's Lab.)

Energy Encounter – A series of displays focusing on the civilian use of nuclear power, including:

- history of nuclear reactors and discussion of their engineering principles
- examination of nuclear power accidents, safety engineering, and waste treatment/storage
- models of the American Palo Verde Nuclear Generating Station and French Superphénix Fast breeder reactor
- a model of the NS Savannah, the first nuclear-powered merchant ship
- nuclear energy as one part of a spectrum of alternative energy-producing methods

Radiation 101 – A display of everyday items and activities that expose people to ionizing radiation as well as a free-standing case containing the companion exhibit to the online exhibition: Atomic Advertising

Atomic Pop Culture – Visitors may be entertained while viewing how American popular culture reflected the dawning of the Atomic Age. This includes vintage movie memorabilia, comic books, accessories, and more.

Nuclear Waste Transportation – The TruPact II container is on display in this exhibit – a type of transportation container used by the US Department of Energy (DOE) to transport transuranic waste.

What's Up With U(ranium) – An exhibit that seeks to engage visitors in answering questions like "where does uranium come from," "how does it move through the environment," "how does it affect us," and "is it radioactive?"

Uranium; Enriching Your Future – A partially interactive exhibit that explains how nuclear power contributes to the energy industry.

Dark Cube: Heisenberg's Race for the Bomb – A special exhibition where visitors can learn about Nazi Germany's futile effort to outpace the Manhattan Project's atomic weapons research featuring a "dense, two-inch charcoal-black cube made of pure uranium metal that Nazi scientists suspended with 663 other similar cubes."

Nuclear by Mail – This exhibit displays the development of nuclear science and technology in the 20th century through these developments' appearance on stationery.

Temporary Exhibit Hall – An area devoted to different temporary exhibits.

Both self-guided and docent-led tours are available.

=== Noteworthy artifacts ===
- Little Boy and Fat Man casings
- the only full size replica of the "Gadget" and Trinity Test Tower
- assorted modern nuclear bombs and warheads
- a WE.177 bomb (British nuclear weapon deployed from the 1960s until 1998)
- a Norden bombsight
- two of the actual B28 bomb casings from the 1966 Palomares accident
- a collection of items reflecting daily life at Los Alamos during the Manhattan Project as well as a case representing Oak Ridge
- an assortment of kitsch and products exemplifying the impact of the Atomic Age on US culture.
- an early fluoroscope X-ray device
- a PRISM 2000 XP Gamma Camera (example of more modern nuclear imaging technology)
- a display of nuclear and homeopathic medical quackery artifacts
- an extensive model collection of military aircraft and other vehicles
- a Lego model of Chicago Pile-1
- a cube of uranium used by the Nazis in their effort to build an atomic weapon (on indefinite loan from Dr. Tim Koeth)
- a 260 mm M65 Atomic Cannon, often referred to as "Atomic Annie"

Controversy arose when the Museum relocated to the Old Town museum district and erected its Redstone rocket at the corner of 20th Street and Mountain Road NW. Some people saw the erecting of the rocket in an area of the city frequented by lovers of the arts and families with children as emblematic of pervasive military-industrial complex influence in Albuquerque and New Mexico. Others saw the rocket as relevant to an accurate portrayal of New Mexico's involvement in the nuclear age. With the opening of the new museum, the Redstone rocket was relocated to the Eubank site.

=== Aircraft on display ===
Due to its colocation with Kirtland AFB, the museum has acquired several historically significant aircraft.

Type	S/N	Service	Note
Boeing B-29 Superfortress	45-21748	1945–19??	Formerly of the 509th Bombardment Group, Roswell Army Airfield, NM. Modified to carry nuclear weapons as part of the Silverplate Project.
Boeing B-47E-111-BW	53-2280	1953–1970	Formerly of the 4950th Test Wing flight test platform for fly-by-wire technology in 1969. Formerly on display at National Museum of the United States Air Force until 2012 when transferred to the museum.
Boeing RB-52B-10-BO	52-013	1953–1963	This individual airplane has dropped more than a dozen live nuclear bombs during weapons testing. One of only seven RB-52s built.
F-105D-20-RE	61-0107	1962–1981	Formerly of the 49th Tactical Fighter Wing, later the Kansas Air National Guard. Retired in 1981 and assigned to Kirtland AFB as a battle damage maintenance simulator.
F-16A Block 5	78-0050	1979–1997	Formerly of the 466th Fighter Squadron, Hill AFB. Displayed in the colors of the New Mexico Air National Guard.
TA-7C Corsair II	64-17666	1968–1991	Vietnam veteran.
Mig-21F Fishbed	74-2313	1975–19??	Former Hungarian Air Force aircraft. Displayed in colors of the Soviet Air Force.

== Governance ==
In 2023, Jennifer Hayden became the president and CEO of the NMNSH, replacing Jim Walther, who was executive director of the museum for 26 years. The museum is governed by a board of trustees of 23 members, including Sandra Biedron and Katrina Groth. The board also includes persons honored as trustees by the museum, including Richard Rhodes, and once included Pete Domenici and Murray Gell-Mann.

== Science education and community activities ==
The Museum conducts year-round primary, secondary, and adult education programs both in-house and via outreach using the Up'n'Atom Mobile. Professional educator development programs support New Mexico school curriculum standards. The museum hosts guest speakers, annual special events, and week-long youth science camps in the summer. Rental space is available for birthdays, weddings, conferences, and other occasions.

== In popular culture ==
The former museum site was used in the 2008 AMC television show Breaking Bad in a storyline as a drug drop area. It appeared in several scenes in the season 2 episode Negro y Azul.

== See also ==
- American Museum of Science and Energy
- Bradbury Science Museum
- National Atomic Testing Museum
