= Bradbury Science Museum =

Museum in Los Alamos, New Mexico

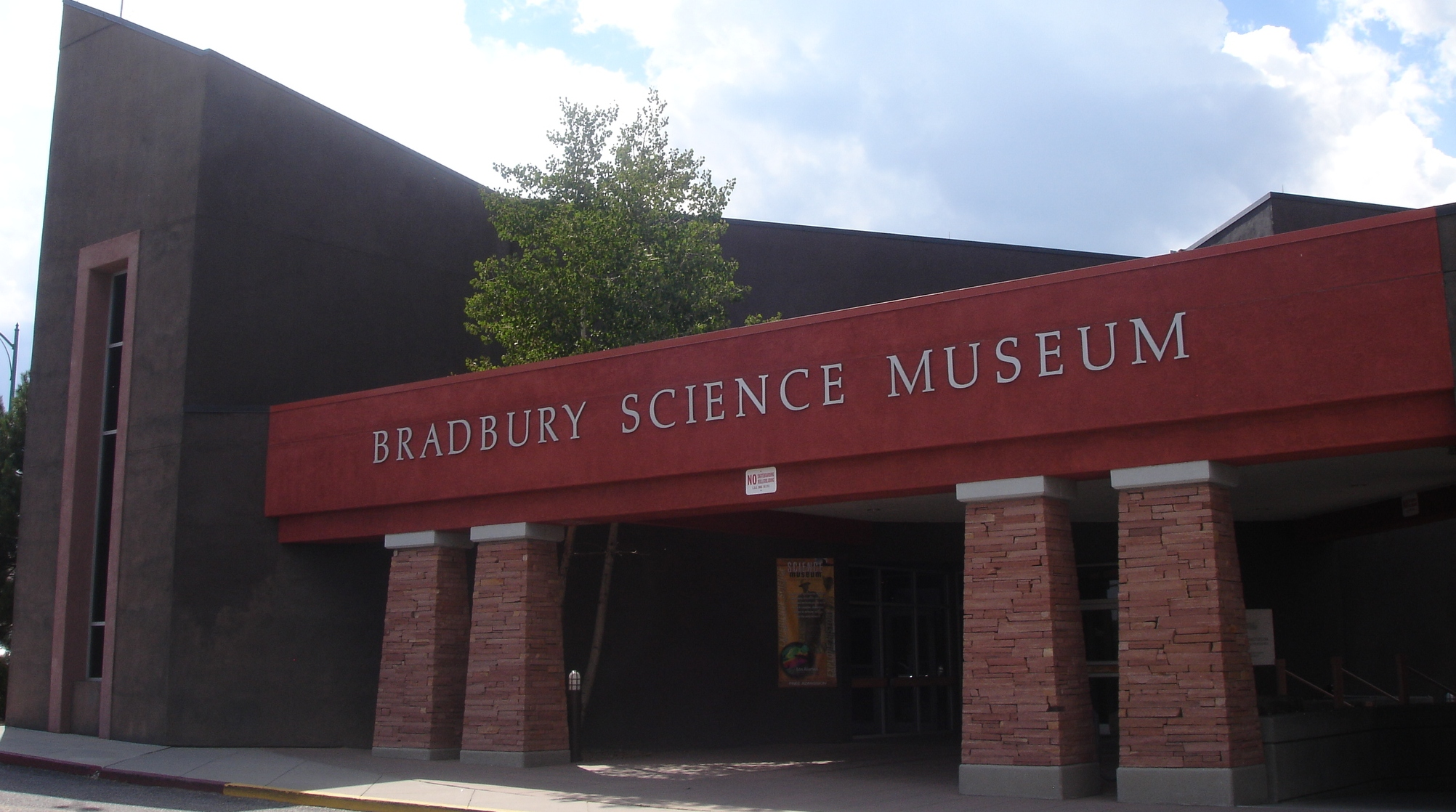
- Established: 1953
- Location: Los Alamos, New Mexico
- Coordinates: 35.881575°N 106.298518°W
- Director: Linda T. Deck
- Website: www.lanl.gov/museum/

The Bradbury Science Museum is the chief public facility of Los Alamos National Laboratory, located at 1350 Central Avenue in Los Alamos, New Mexico, in the United States. It was founded in 1953, and was named for the Laboratory's second director (1945–1970), Norris E. Bradbury. Among the museum's early exhibits, artifacts and documents from World War II Manhattan Project were displayed upon declassification. Other exhibits include full-size models of the Little Boy and Fat Man atomic bombs. Admission is free.

== Early years ==
Robert Krohn, who oversaw early nuclear testing at what was then known as Los Alamos Scientific Laboratory, thought the facility required a museum to house historical relics related to weapons research in 1953. Krohn convinced Norris Bradbury (Laboratory director, 1945–1970) a museum could preserve the Laboratory's history and provide a place for official visitors to learn about the Laboratory's weapon programs.

An old ice house on the bank of Ashley Pond across from Fuller Lodge became the first Laboratory museum. Already fitted with a vault door, the ice house satisfied security standards for housing the classified exhibits Krohn wanted to preserve. The ice house Museum opened to official visitors in 1954.

In 1963, Robert Porton, director of community relations at the Laboratory, expressed an interest in adding unclassified exhibits to the Museum.

Bradbury approved the transfer of unclassified exhibits to an area open to the public, and soon World War II-era documents and photographs, tracing the development of the town and the Laboratory, were displayed with scientific memorabilia and working models of unclassified research projects. In its first year, 14,000 visitors from 50 states and 40 countries visited the Museum.

In 1965, the Museum was moved to larger quarters. The range and number of exhibits grew rapidly and included many hands-on models contributed by scientific groups and divisions within the Laboratory.

== Named after Norris E. Bradbury ==
In 1970, the museum was renamed the Norris E. Bradbury Science Museum, honoring the laboratory's second director. Eventually, the museum's official name was shortened to the Bradbury Science Museum. Major renovations to the Museum took place in 1981. Informal, donated exhibits gave way to professionally designed exhibits in a formal museum atmosphere. Videotapes, videodisks, and interactive computer programs were introduced. New artifacts included a Mark 12A warhead, models of Vela and Navistar verification and communication satellites, and an air-launched cruise missile.

== Moved to downtown Los Alamos ==
By 1987, annual attendance had reached 80,000, and parking space for visitors was disappearing. Laboratory officials began exploring options for relocating the Museum site. In April 1993, the Museum moved into its new and present location in the heart of downtown Los Alamos. The building was designed by William Agnew and Associates and is leased by the Laboratory from a private owner.

== Today ==
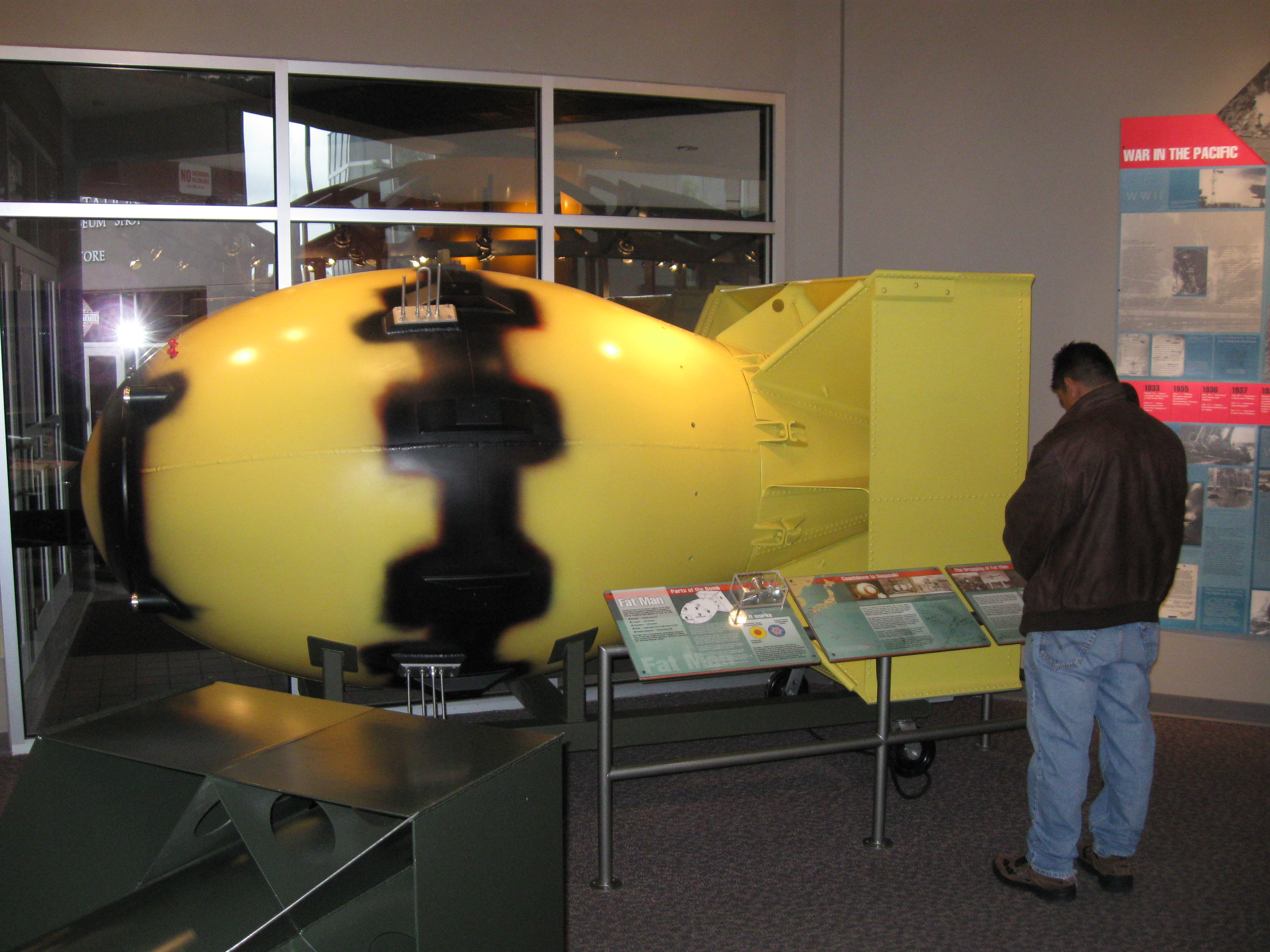
Model of the Fat Man atomic bomb.

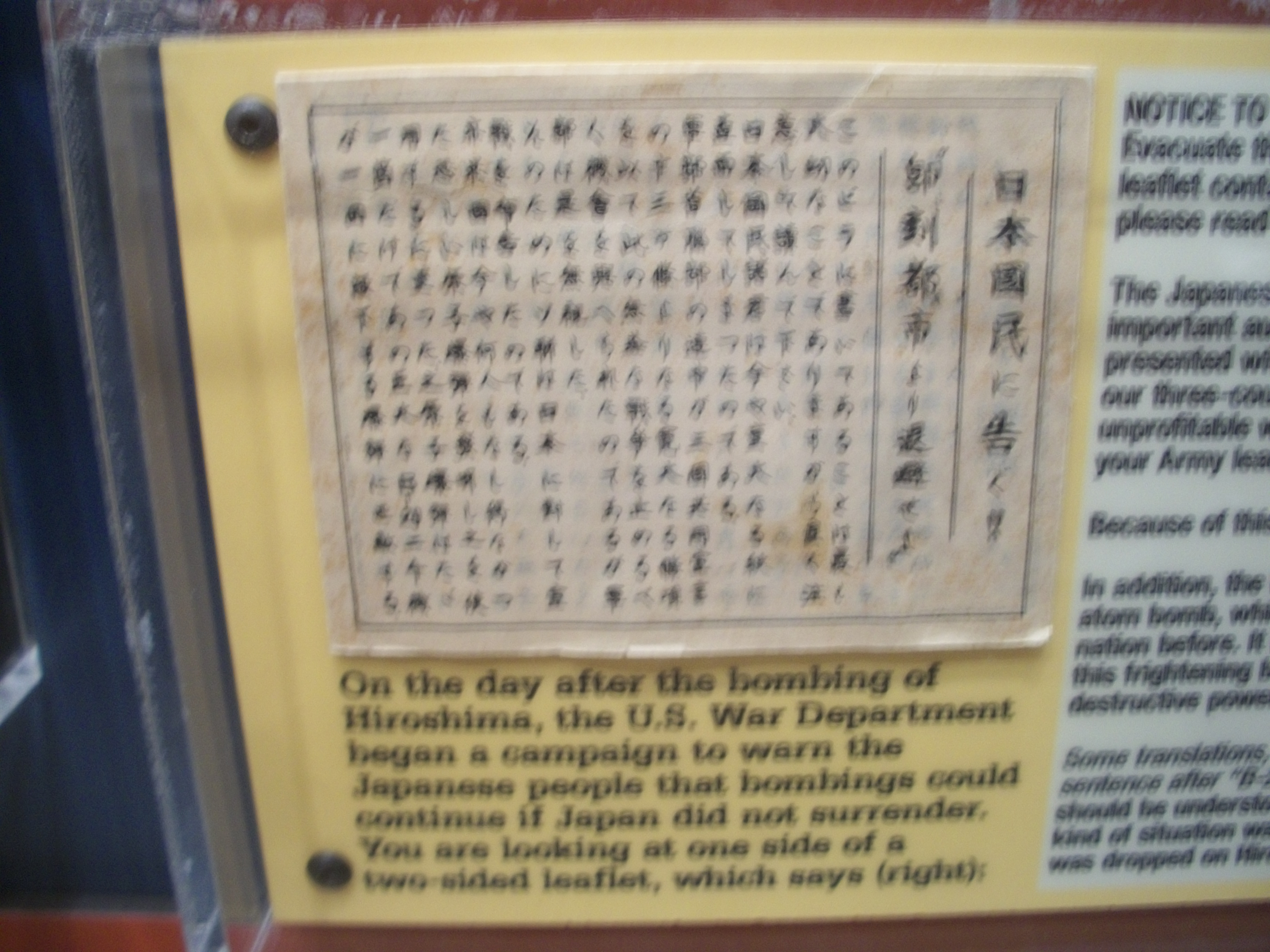
One of the thousands of leaflets dropped on Hiroshima warning the Japanese of further atomic attacks unless the government surrendered.

Approximately 40 interactive exhibits trace the history of the World War II Manhattan Project, highlight the Laboratory's current and historic research projects related to defense and technology, and focus on Laboratory research related to national security, nuclear weapons stockpile stewardship, and other fields. Recent additions to the museum's collections are exhibits about the history of supercomputers, the Los Alamos Neutron Science Center, Los Alamos' contributions to the Mars Science Laboratory (Curiosity rover), nanotechnology, algae biofuels, and high explosives.

== See also ==
- American Museum of Science and Energy
- National Atomic Testing Museum
- National Museum of Nuclear Science & History
