= American Museum of Science and Energy =

Science museum in Oak Ridge, Tennessee, US

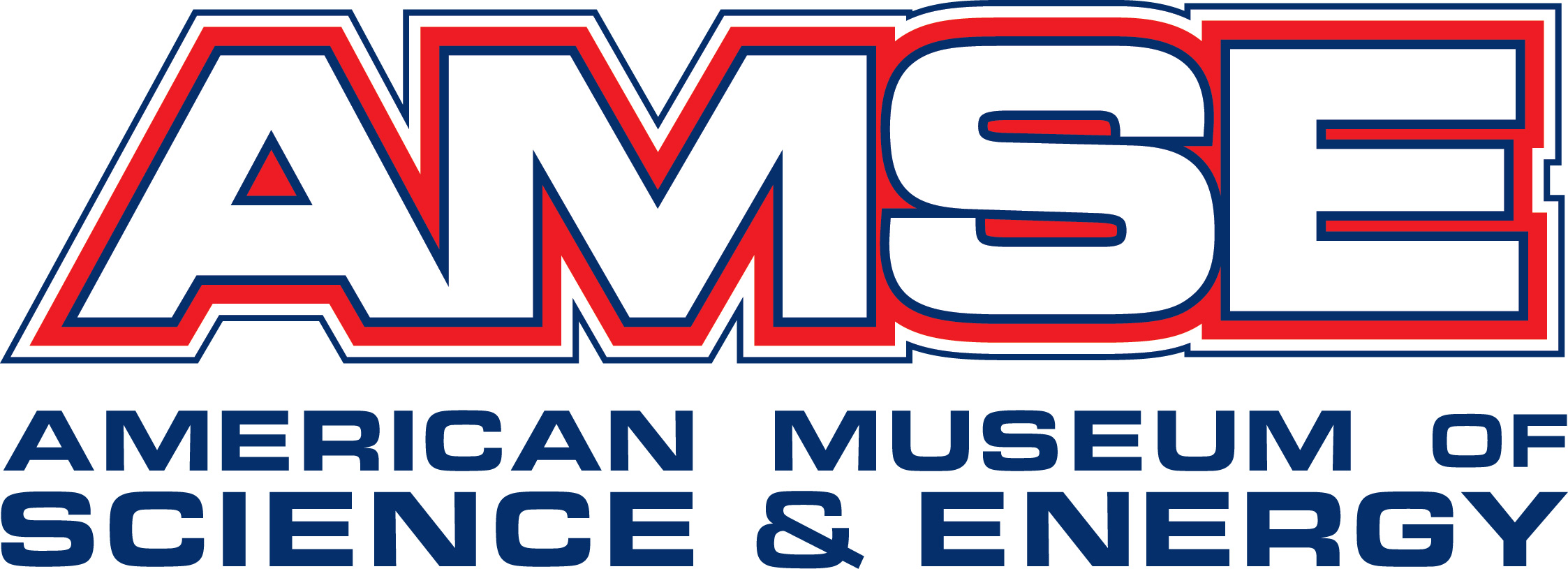

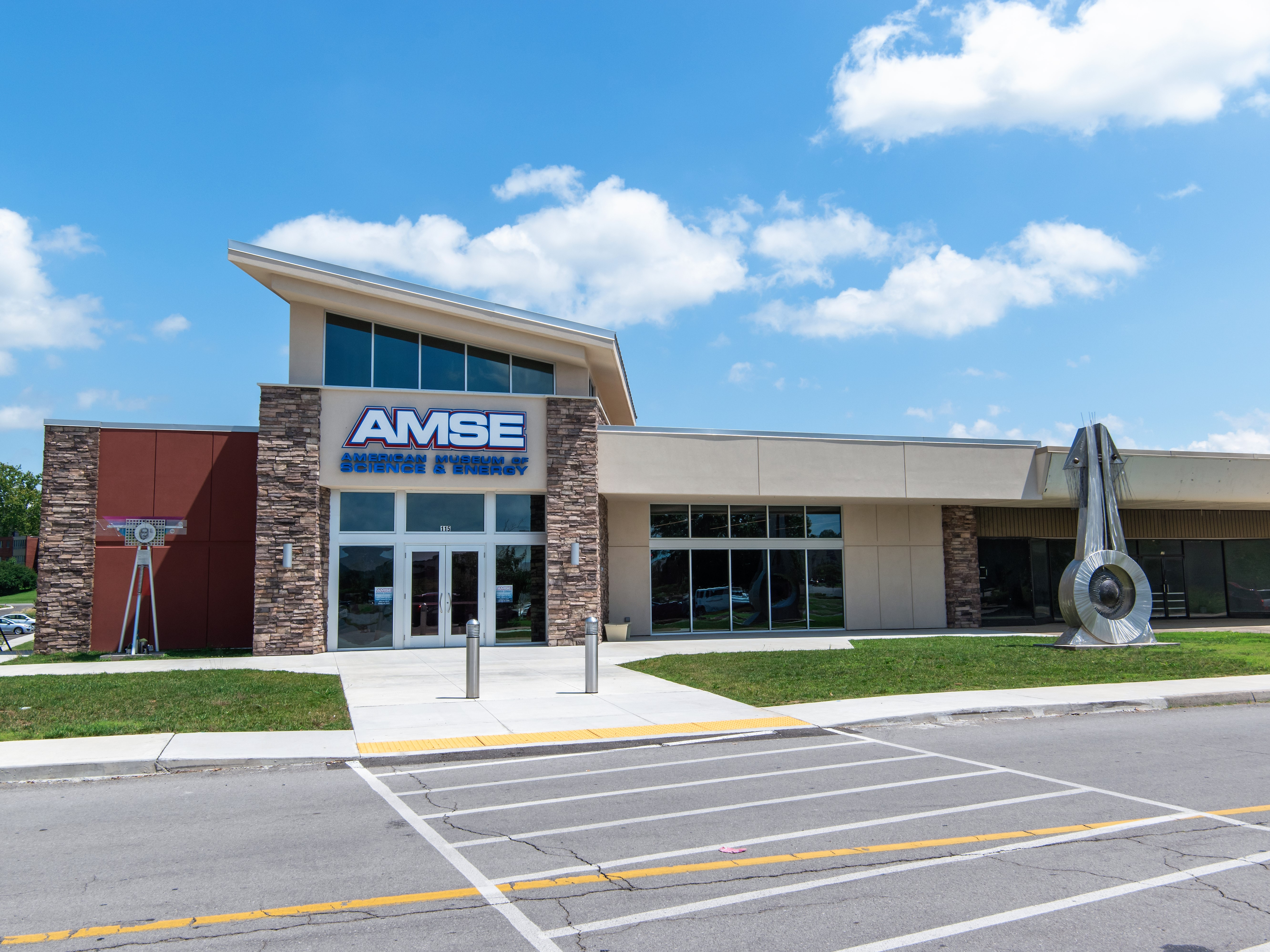
- Established: 1949
- Location: 115 East Main Street, Oak Ridge, Tennessee
- Coordinates: 36°00′45″N 84°15′10″W
- Type: Science museum
- Accreditation: American Alliance of Museums, Smithsonian Affiliations, Association of Science-Technology Centers
- Executive director: Alan Lowe
- Curator: Quinn Argall
- Owner: AMSE Foundation
- Website: amse.org

The American Museum of Science and Energy (AMSE) is a science museum in Oak Ridge, Tennessee, designed to teach children and adults about energy, especially nuclear power, and to document the role Oak Ridge played in the Manhattan Project. The focus of the museum is on technology; the nearby Oak Ridge History Museum concentrates more on the social impacts of the Manhattan Project on the town of Oak Ridge.

== Exhibits and tours ==
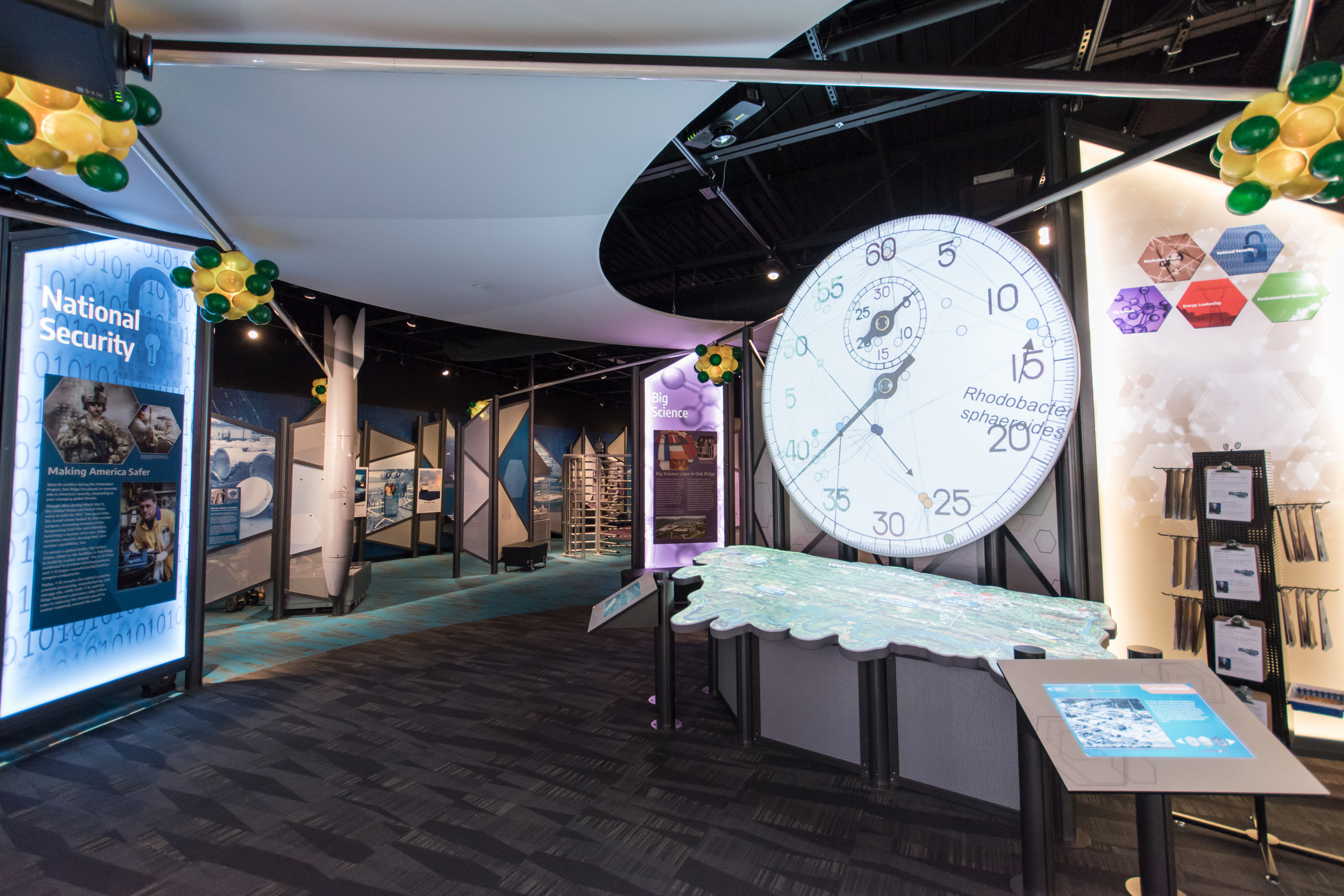
Exhibit space, 2019

The museum has both permanent and rotating exhibits, including robots, science puzzles, a NOAA weather station, a timeline of atomic discoveries, a large Van de Graaff generator, a display devoted to nuclear weapons and the Y-12 Plant, and a solar energy demonstration project. Its flagship exhibit, titled "Secret City - The Oak Ridge Story", was completely redesigned and rebuilt in 2007. A World War II-vintage flat top house, one of many inhabited by Manhattan Project workers in Oak Ridge, opened as a walk-through attraction in 2009, but was moved to the grounds of the Children's Museum of Oak Ridge in 2018 and is now used by the Manhattan Project National Historical Park as part of a display of the history of Oak Ridge. Several photos by Ed Westcott are on display.

The museum also provides bus tours of the local sites of the Manhattan Project National Historical Park including the X-10 Graphite Reactor National Historic Landmark, the Y-12 National Security Complex and the East Tennessee Technology Park, located on the site of the K-25 Building.

The K-25 History Center, a 7,500-square foot museum operated by AMSE opened at the K-25 site in 2020.

The museum is open seven days a week. The museum was free to the public for many years when its operation was fully funded by the U.S. federal government, but now charges for admission. The museum is a Smithsonian Affiliate.

== History ==
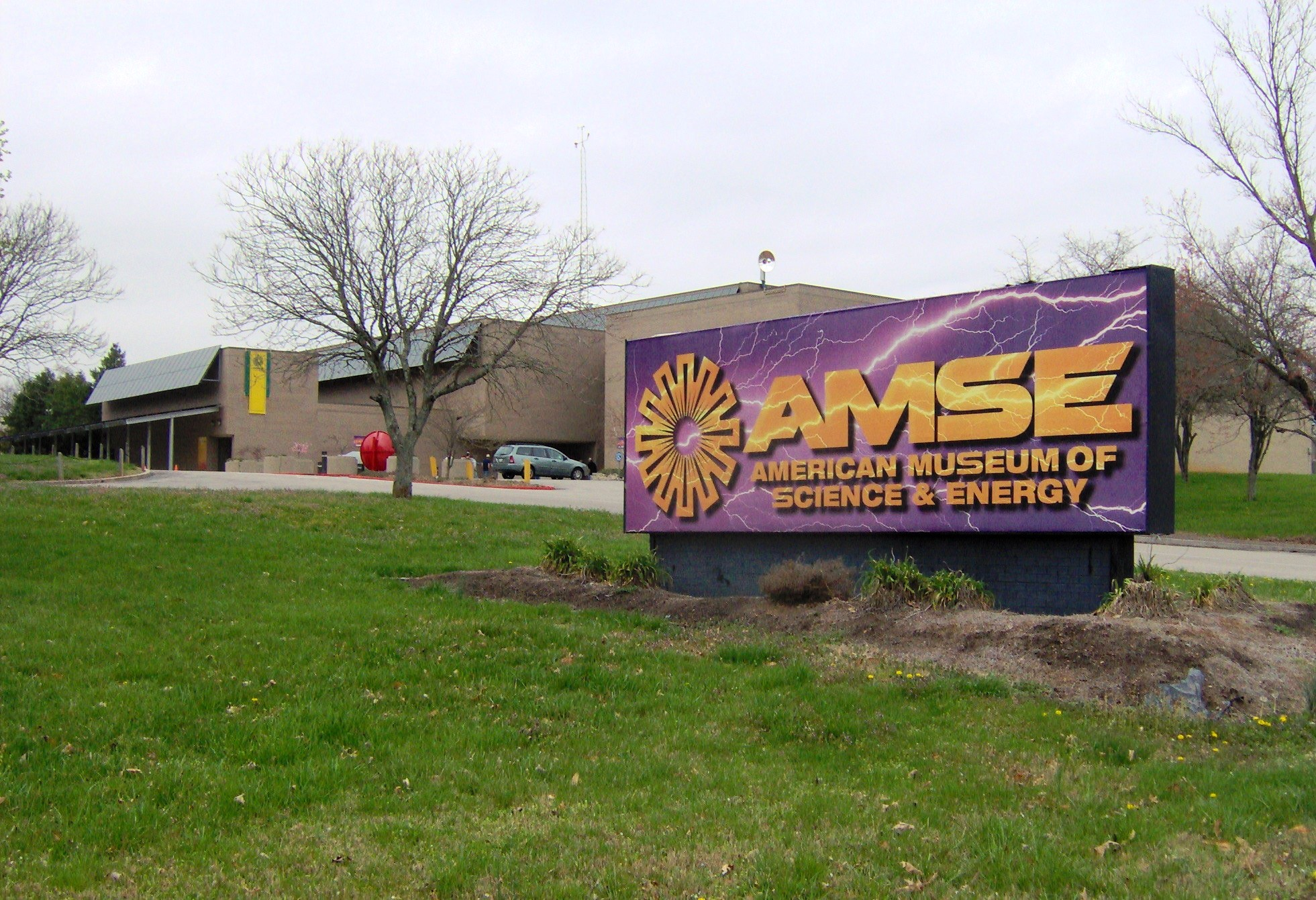
Former location

The museum opened as the American Museum of Atomic Energy on March 19, 1949 in an old World War II cafeteria on Jefferson Circle. It moved to its second facility, a new building at 300 South Tulane Avenue, in 1975 and was renamed AMSE in 1978. As of June 2019, the museum is located in the shopping mall across the street from the old location. The one-story building has 18,000 square feet (1,700 m^{2}).

== See also ==
- Bradbury Science Museum
- National Atomic Testing Museum
- National Museum of Nuclear Science & History
