= Manhattan Project National Historical Park =

National Historical Park of the United States

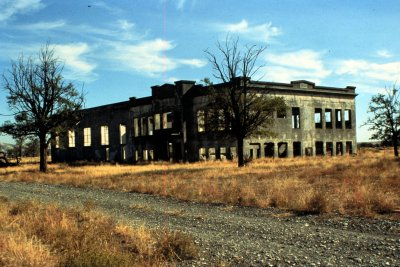
- Hanford High, a part of the park in Washington
- Interactive map of Manhattan Project National Historical Park
- Location: Oak Ridge, Tennessee, Los Alamos, New Mexico, and Hanford, Washington, United States
- Coordinates: 35°56′13″N 84°23′40″W (Tennessee Unit)
- Established: November 10, 2015
- Visitors: 56,390 (in 2025)
- Governing body: National Park Service, Department of Energy
- Website: Manhattan Project National Historical Park

Manhattan Project National Historical Park is a United States National Historical Park commemorating the Manhattan Project that is run jointly by the National Park Service and Department of Energy. The park consists of three units: one in Oak Ridge, Tennessee, one in Los Alamos, New Mexico, and one in Hanford, Washington. It was established on November 10, 2015 when Secretary of the Interior Sally Jewell and Secretary of Energy Ernest Moniz signed the memorandum of agreement that defined the roles that the two agencies had when managing the park.

The Department of Energy had owned and managed most of the properties located within the three different sites. For over ten years, the DoE worked with the National Park Service and federal, state and local governments and agencies with the intention of turning places of importance into a National Historical Park. After several years of surveying the three sites and five other possible alternatives, the two agencies officially recommended a historical park be established in Hanford, Los Alamos and Oak Ridge.

The Department of Energy would continue to manage and own the sites while the National Park Service would provide interpretive services, visitor centers and park rangers. After two unsuccessful attempts at passing a bill in Congress authorizing the park in 2012 and 2013, the House and Senate ultimately passed the bill in December 2014, with President Obama signing the National Defense Authorization Act shortly thereafter which authorized the Manhattan Project National Historical Park.

== Sites ==
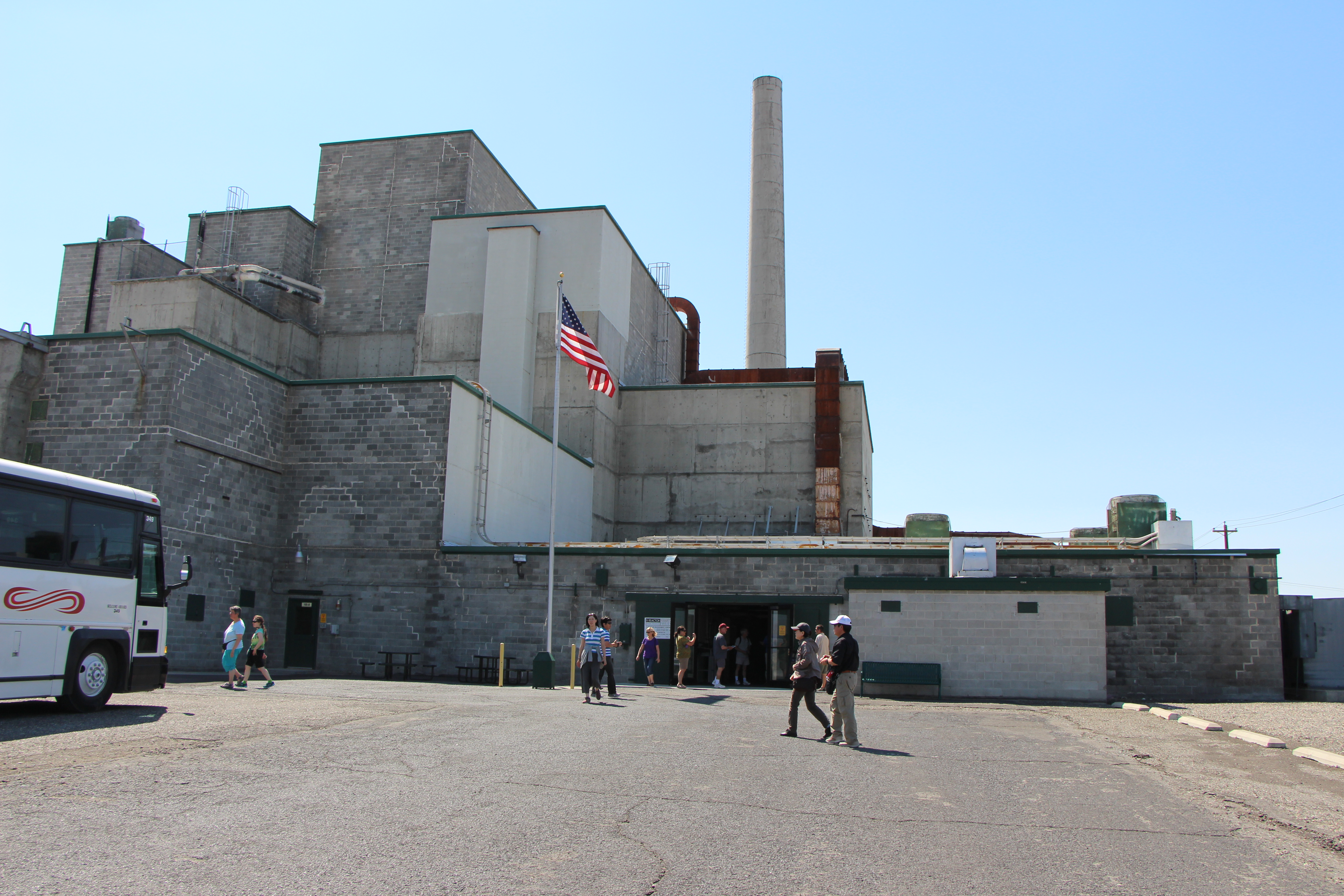
Hanford B Reactor

The Manhattan Project National Historical Park protects many structures associated with the Manhattan Project, but only some are open for touring.

=== Hanford, Washington ===
- B Reactor National Historic Landmark – bus tours are available by advance reservation
- the previous Hanford High School in the former Town of Hanford and Hanford Construction Camp Historic District
- Bruggemann's Agricultural Warehouse Complex
- White Bluffs Bank and Hanford Irrigation District Pump House

=== Los Alamos, New Mexico ===
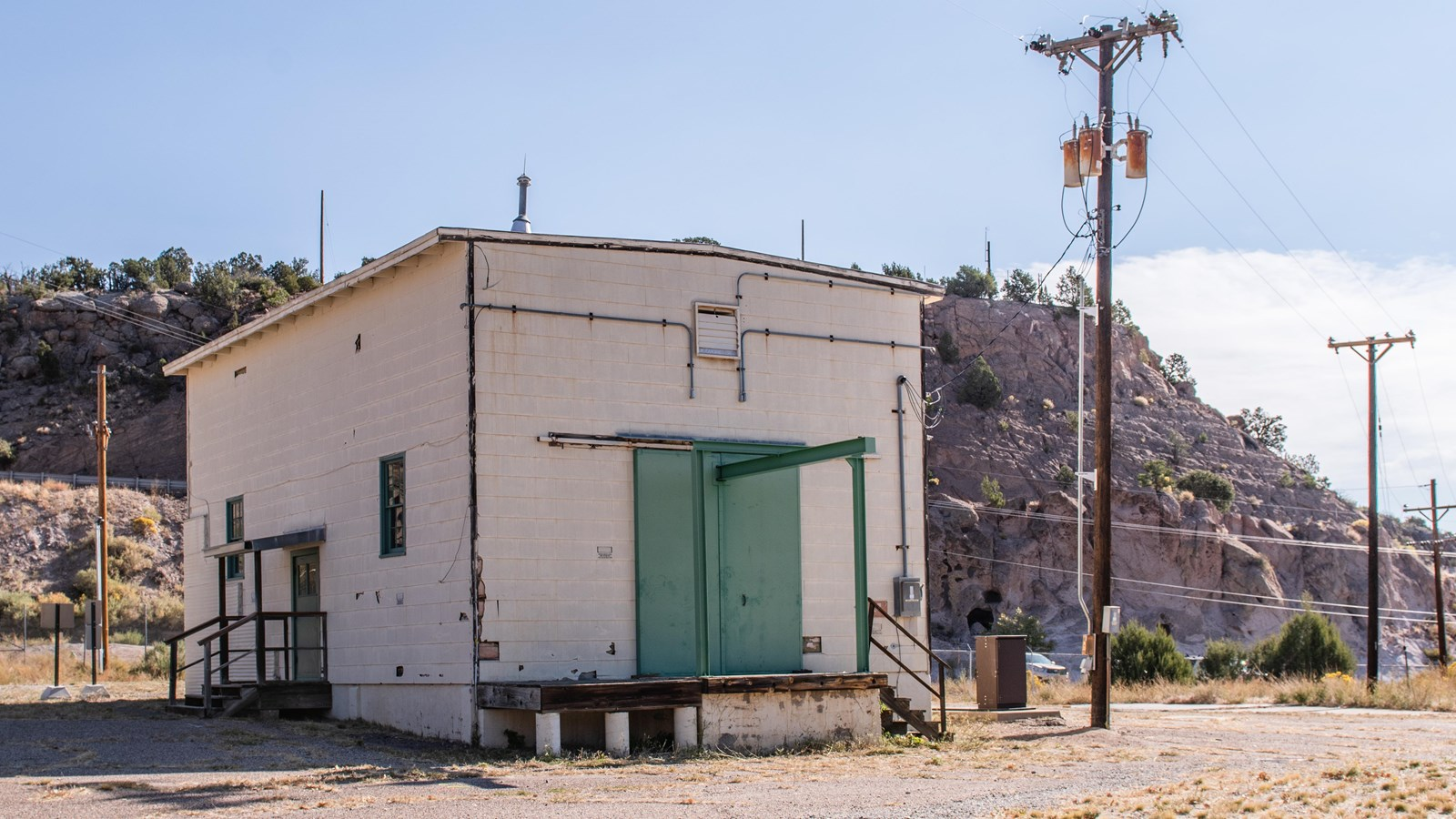
The Slotin Building

The Los Alamos Visitor Center for the Manhattan Project NHP is located at 475 20th Street in downtown Los Alamos. This location is open Friday through Monday from 10 am to 3 pm. It is in the Los Alamos Community Building on the front left as you face the building from the street (next to the Los Alamos Teen Center). Visitors can learn about the Manhattan Project and related sites in the vicinity.

There are three areas of the park located on Los Alamos National Laboratory property. These locations are only open to the public by special bus tours organized by the Department of Energy:

- Gun Site Facilities: three bunkered buildings (TA-8-1, TA-8-2, and TA-8-3), and a portable guard shack (TA-8-172).
- V-Site Facilities: TA-16-516 and TA-16-517 V-Site Assembly Building
- Pajarito Site: TA-18-1 Slotin Building, TA-8-2 Battleship Control Building, and the TA-18-29 Pond Cabin.

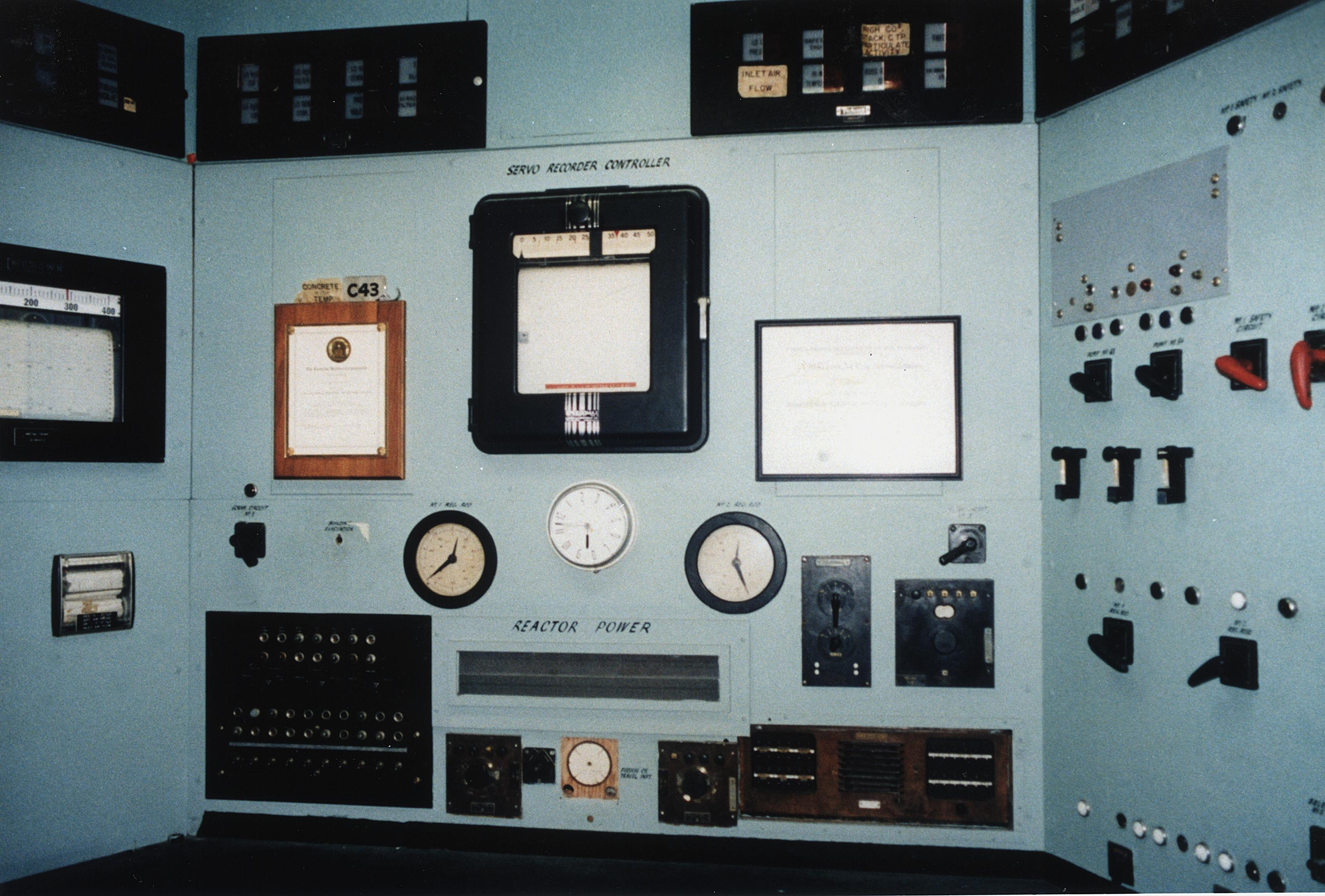
Controls of the X-10 Graphite Reactor

=== Oak Ridge, Tennessee ===
The American Museum of Science and Energy provides bus tours of several buildings in the Clinton Engineer Works including the:

- X-10 Graphite Reactor
- Buildings 9731 and 9204-3 at the Y-12 complex
- East Tennessee Technology Park, located on the site of the K-25 Building

The Oak Ridge History Museum concentrates on the social impact on Oak Ridge from the Manhattan Project.
