= National Atomic Testing Museum =

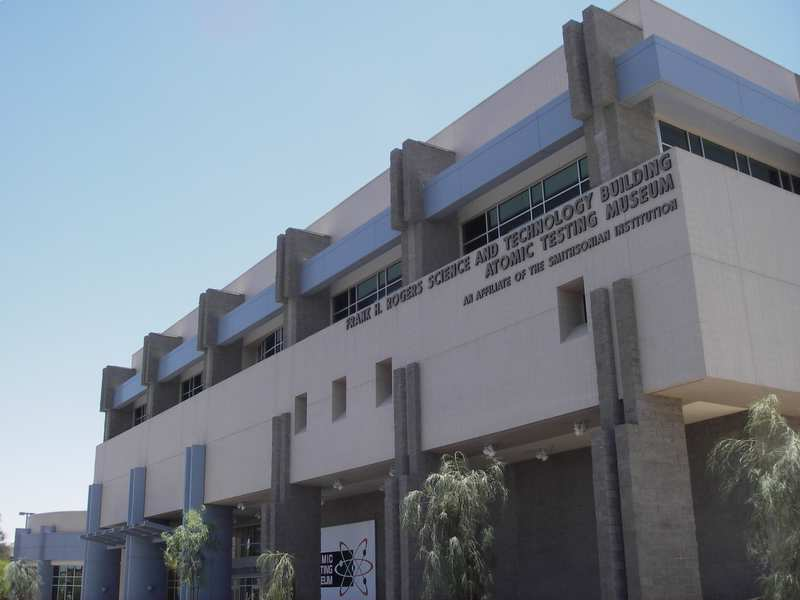
- Established: March 2005
- Location: Las Vegas, Nevada, United States
- Coordinates: 36.11416°N 115.1486°W
- Type: History museum
- Website: www.atomicmuseum.vegas

The National Atomic Testing Museum in Las Vegas, Nevada, documents the history of nuclear testing at the Nevada Test Site (NTS) in the Mojave Desert about 65 miles (105 km) northwest of Las Vegas. The museum operates as an affiliate of the Smithsonian Institution.

== Founding ==
The museum opened in March 2005 as the "Atomic Testing Museum", operated by the Nevada Test Site Historical Foundation as a 501(c)(3) non-profit organization. It is located in Las Vegas, Nevada, at 755 E. Flamingo Rd., just north of Harry Reid International Airport and just east of the Las Vegas Strip, adjacent to the UNLV campus. Funding included support from purchasing commemorative Nevada Test Site license plates issued by the Nevada Department of Motor Vehicles.

On December 31, 2011, President Barack Obama signed a military spending bill that included designating the museum as a national museum affiliated with the Smithsonian Institution. The National Atomic Testing Museum is one of 37 national museums in the U.S.

== Exhibits ==
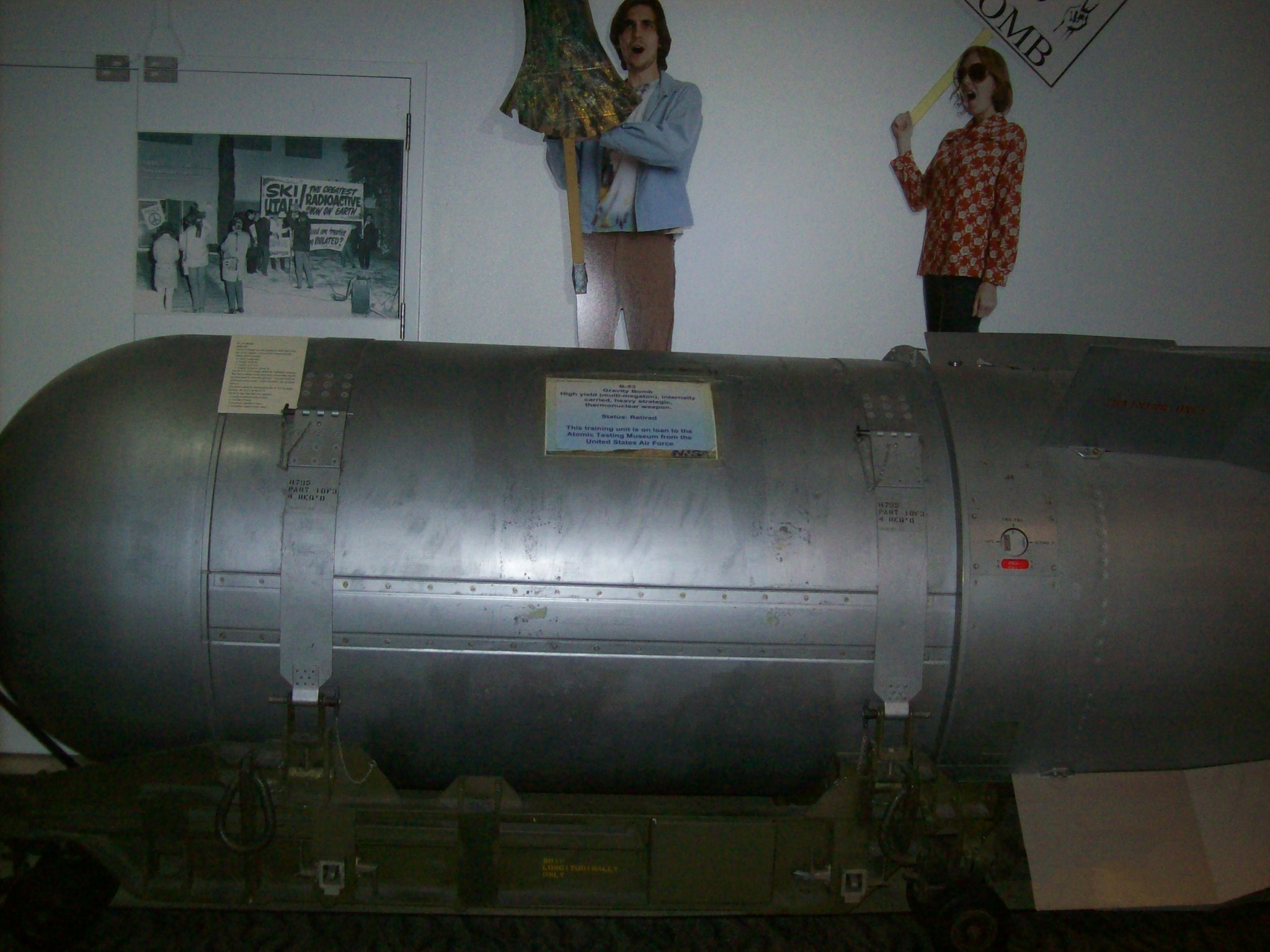
B53 nuclear bomb on display

The museum covers the period from the first test at NTS on January 27, 1951, to the present. Among its exhibits covering American nuclear history is a "Ground Zero Theater", which simulates the experience of observing an atmospheric nuclear test.

Other exhibits include Geiger counters, radio badges and radiation testing devices, Native American artifacts from around the test area, pop culture memorabilia related to the atomic age, and equipment used in testing the devices. Other displays focus on important figures at the facility, videos, and interactive exhibits about radiation. The museum also features a piece of the Berlin Wall, Berlin Wall graffiti art, and two pieces from the World Trade Center.

In 2012 the museum added an exhibit about Area 51, and expanded the exhibit two years later.

== Weather monitoring ==
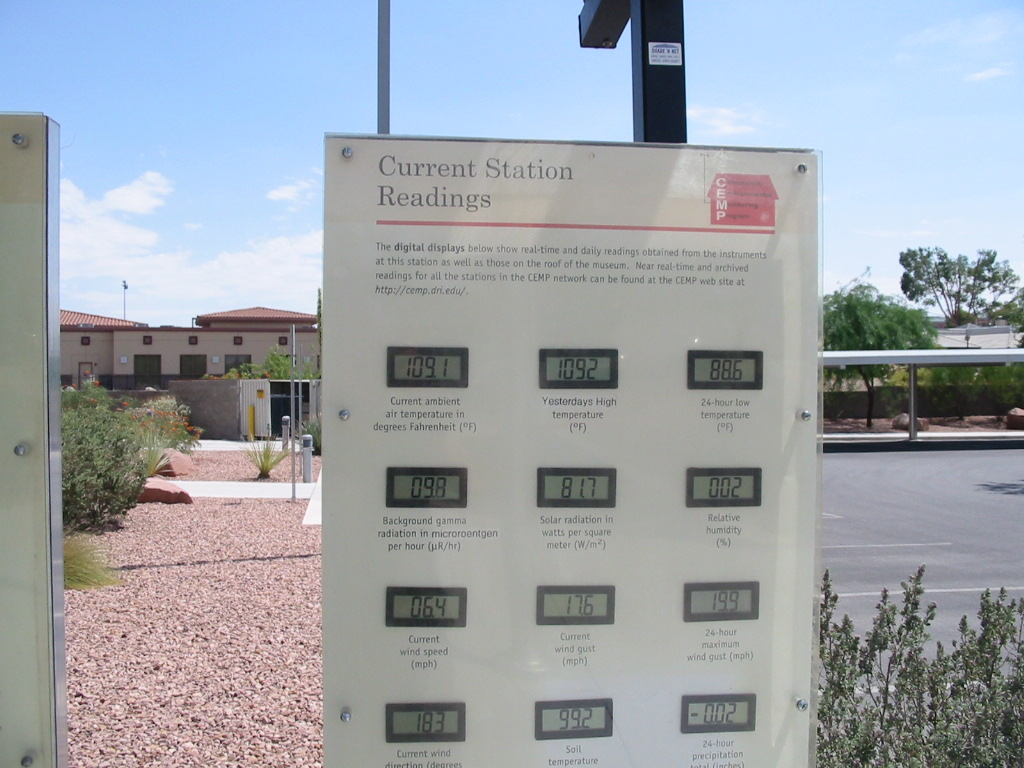
Weather station outside the National Atomic Testing Museum

The weather station outside of the National Atomic Testing Museum records weather data for downtown Las Vegas. The data include temperature, wind speed, and background gamma radiation in microroentgens per hour. The station is part of the Community Environmental Monitoring Network (CEMP).

== See also ==
- How to Photograph an Atomic Bomb
- American Museum of Science and Energy
- Bradbury Science Museum
- National Museum of Nuclear Science & History
