= National Register of Historic Places listings in Roane County, Tennessee =

Location of Roane County in Tennessee

This is a list of the National Register of Historic Places listings in Roane County, Tennessee.

This is intended to be a complete list of the properties and historic districts in Roane County, Tennessee, United States, that are listed on the National Register of Historic Places. Latitude and longitude coordinates are provided for many National Register properties and districts; these locations may be seen together on a map.

The county has 20 properties and districts listed on the National Register, including one National Historic Landmark.

See also National Register of Historic Places listings in Anderson County, Tennessee for additional properties in Oak Ridge and Oliver Springs, cities spanning the county line.

Contents: Counties in Tennessee
Anderson – Bedford – Benton – Bledsoe – Blount – Bradley – Campbell – Cannon – Carroll – Carter – Cheatham – Chester – Claiborne – Clay – Cocke – Coffee – Crockett – Cumberland – Davidson – Decatur – DeKalb – Dickson – Dyer – Fayette – Fentress – Franklin – Gibson – Giles – Grainger – Greene – Grundy – Hamblen – Hamilton – Hancock – Hardeman – Hardin – Hawkins – Haywood – Henderson – Henry – Hickman – Houston – Humphreys – Jackson – Jefferson – Johnson – Knox – Lake – Lauderdale – Lawrence – Lewis – Lincoln – Loudon – Macon – Madison – Marion – Marshall – Maury – McMinn – McNairy – Meigs – Monroe – Montgomery – Moore – Morgan – Obion – Overton – Perry – Pickett – Polk – Putnam – Rhea – Roane – Robertson – Rutherford – Scott – Sequatchie – Sevier – Shelby – Smith – Stewart – Sullivan – Sumner – Tipton – Trousdale – Unicoi – Union – Van Buren – Warren – Washington – Wayne – Weakley – White – Williamson – Wilson

This National Park Service list is complete through NPS recent listings posted January 9, 2026.

== Current listings ==
	Name on the Register	Image	Date listed	Location	City or town	Description
1	Abston Garage	Abston Garage	March 10, 2009 (#09000117)	301 Kingston Ave; 36°02′39″N 84°20′39″W	Oliver Springs	
2	Bethel Cemetery	Bethel Cemetery	June 26, 2006 (#06000547)	Euclid Ave. and 3rd St. 35°52′16″N 84°31′02″W	Kingston	
3	Colonial Hall	Colonial Hall	September 11, 1975 (#75001774)	104 Morgan St; 36°02′39″N 84°20′26″W	Oliver Springs	Antebellum house currently being restored
4	Cornstalk Heights Historic District	Cornstalk Heights Historic District	January 11, 1991 (#90002142)	Roughly bounded by Georgia Ave., Sewanee St., Morgan Ave., and Trenton St. 35°56′03″N 84°32′48″W	Harriman	Contains several dozen contributing houses built in the 1890s through the 1930s
5	Harriman City Hall	Harriman City Hall	April 16, 1971 (#71000828)	330 N Roane St. 35°56′03″N 84°33′06″W	Harriman	Building originally housed American Temperance University.
6	George Jones Memorial Baptist Church	George Jones Memorial Baptist Church	May 6, 1992 (#92000408)	Blair Rd. 35°56′21″N 84°22′22″W	Oak Ridge	
7	Kingston Avenue Historic District	Kingston Avenue Historic District	December 1, 1997 (#97001500)	Roughly along N. Kingston, S. Kingston, and E. Rockwood Aves. 35°51′56″N 84°41′04″W	Rockwood	
8	Molyneux Chevrolet Company-Rockwood Fire Department Building	Molyneux Chevrolet Company-Rockwood Fire Department Building	March 20, 2002 (#02000234)	228 West Rockwood St. 35°52′07″N 84°41′14″W	Rockwood	Building which was part fire station and part car dealership.
9	Col. Gideon Morgan House	Col. Gideon Morgan House	January 27, 1983 (#83003060)	149 N Kentucky St. 35°52′20″N 84°30′59″W	Kingston	Oldest house in county. Bought in 1936 by William B. Ladd, Republican candidate for U.S. Senate in 1946
10	New Bethel Baptist Church	New Bethel Baptist Church	May 6, 1992 (#92000409)	Bethel Valley Rd. 35°56′01″N 84°18′19″W	Oak Ridge	
11	Oak Ridge Turnpike Checking Station	Oak Ridge Turnpike Checking Station	May 6, 1992 (#92000412)	Oak Ridge Turnpike; 35°58′49″N 84°20′03″W	Oak Ridge	One of three NRHP-listed World War II-era checkpoint gatehouses in Oak Ridge
12	Post Oak Springs Christian Church	Post Oak Springs Christian Church	March 15, 2007 (#07000156)	Roane St. Highway (Old Kingston Highway) at Post Oak Rd. 35°52′25″N 84°38′02″W	Rockwood	
13	Roane County Courthouse	Roane County Courthouse	July 14, 1971 (#71000829)	119 Court St; 35°52′18″N 84°30′57″W	Kingston	Now a museum; the new courthouse is located across the street
14	Roane Street Commercial Historic District	Roane Street Commercial Historic District	June 29, 1989 (#89000506)	Roughly Roane St. between Morgan Ave., NW. and Crescent Ave., NW. 35°56′04″N 84°33′01″W	Harriman	Includes a theater, a Carnegie library, an old post office, and several storefronts along Roane Street
15	Rockwood Post Office	Rockwood Post Office	December 30, 1999 (#99001621)	340 W. Rockwood St. 35°52′11″N 84°41′18″W	Rockwood	
16	Southwest Point	Southwest Point	July 31, 1972 (#72001252)	1 mile southwest of Kingston; 35°51′39″N 84°31′44″W	Kingston vicinity	Fort no longer standing; currently being reconstructed
17	Dr. Fred Stone, Sr. Hospital	Dr. Fred Stone, Sr. Hospital	November 29, 2006 (#06001097)	101 Roane St. 36°02′50″N 84°20′27″W	Oliver Springs	Unique building constructed piecemeal in various phases, many of which can be discerned from the exterior brickwork
18	Tennessee Highway Patrol Buildings	Tennessee Highway Patrol Buildings	March 14, 2001 (#01000255)	Junction of Kingston Ave. and Nelson St.; also Belson St. and U.S. Route 70; 35°51′36″N 84°40′52″W	Rockwood	Second address represents a boundary increase of March 15, 2011
19	Valley View Farm	Valley View Farm	March 21, 1997 (#97000257)	160 Martin Rd. 35°54′09″N 84°36′29″W	Harriman vicinity	mid-19th century farmstead
20	X-10 Reactor, Oak Ridge National Laboratory	X-10 Reactor, Oak Ridge National Laboratory	October 15, 1966 (#66000720)	Oak Ridge National Laboratory; 35°55′41″N 84°19′03″W	Oak Ridge	

== See also ==
- List of National Historic Landmarks in Tennessee
- National Register of Historic Places listings in Tennessee
