= Bunt Stephens =

American fiddler

Uncle Bunt Stephens
- Also known as: Uncle Bunt Stephens
- Born: John L. Stephens; February 2, 1879
- Origin: Bedford County, Tennessee, USA
- Died: May 25, 1951 (aged 72) Moore County, Tennessee, United States
- Genre: Old-time music
- Instrument: Fiddle
- Years active: 1926
- Label: Columbia Records

John L. "Bunt" Stephens (February 2, 1879 — May 25, 1951), known as Uncle Bunt, was an American Old-time fiddle player. He attempted to capitalize on the attention Henry Ford gave to fiddlers like Mellie Dunham and falsely claimed to have won a national fiddle contest sponsored by Ford. Stephens went on to record several tracks for Columbia Records and made several guest appearances on what would later become the Grand Ole Opry in Nashville before retiring to his farm near Lynchburg, Tennessee. His style of fiddle playing is believed to resemble a style that was popular before the American Civil War.

== Life ==
=== Early life ===
Stephens was born in Bedford County, Tennessee on February 2, 1879 (although some sources suggest he was older). He was orphaned at a young age and raised by his aunt in Flatcreek, a small community located about halfway between Lynchburg and Shelbyville. When he was 11, he bought a fiddle from a tramp, and taught himself how to play. He began performing at local square dances in 1896, and played regularly at various events throughout the early 1900s.

Over the years, Stephens' repertoire grew to include folk tunes such as "Sail Away Lady", "The Arkansas Traveler", and "Mississippi Sawyer." Others included "Candy Girl", "Left in the Dark Blues", and "Louisburg Blues", all of which he later recorded. His favorite tune was probably "Old Hen Cackled," which is believed to have won him the blue ribbon at the Ford fiddlers' contest in 1926.

=== The Ford contest ===
In early 1926, Ford Motor Company executives attempted to improve sales by capitalizing on the phenomenal media success of Maine fiddler Mellie Dunham's visit in December 1925 to Henry Ford and in the thousands who came to a Tuesday evening appearance at a Detroit ballroom of Ford's own old-time dance orchestra. During the second week of January, the orchestra broadcast from the Ford showroom on Broadway in New York. An experimental network of radio stations around the country was organized. Local Ford dealers were to participate by getting loudspeakers and inviting the public in to dance to the broadcasts. The two broadcasts were on Tuesday and Friday. However, the Cincinnati station did not operate on Friday. To get around this situation, Ford dealers in Kentucky quickly organized fiddlers' contests, as did those in Tennessee and southern Indiana, all areas covered by the Cincinnati station. After capturing first prize at the Ford dealership in Lynchburg, Stephens proceeded to the Tennessee statewide contest in Nashville, which began on the morning of January 19, 1926. Stephens survived the first round of the state contest, and with five other finalists, was selected to play at a sold-out Ryman Auditorium that night to decide which three fiddlers the state would send to the Southeast regional contest. Stephens won third place behind Uncle Jimmy Thompson and a one-armed fiddler from Hartsville named Marshall Claiborne.

The "Champion of Dixie" contest took place at Brown Theatre in Louisville, Kentucky on January 26–27, 1926. The three finalists from Tennessee competed against three finalists from Kentucky and two from southern Indiana. Stephens won second place behind Indiana fiddler W.H. Elmore, and, being in the top three, earned a trip to Detroit. On February 9–10, 1926, Stephens, along with Elmore and Claiborne, played at a banquet in Dearborn that was held during a convention of Ford dealers from around the country. Henry Ford was present. No contest was held.

=== Recording and performing career ===
After his appearance in Detroit, Stephens went on a tour in an attempt to replicate the commercial success of Mellie Dunham. Stephens played at various venues across the Eastern United States, which included a radio guest spot in Chicago and several guest appearances on the Grand Ole Opry (then called the WSM Barn Dance) in Nashville. In March 1926, Stephens traveled to New York to record several sides for Columbia Records. They remain his only known recordings. In conversations with reporters, Stephens exaggerated the nature of his appearance before Ford, making himself out to be the winner of a series of national contests, when in fact Ford never held any such contest.

Stephens died at his home near Lynchburg on July 25, 1951. He is buried at the Hurricane Church Cemetery just outside Lynchburg. After his death, his recording of "Sail Away Lady" was analyzed by ethnomusicologist Harry Smith, who believed it to be played in a style that pre-dated the American Civil War.

== Discography ==
- Nashville - The Early String Bands, Vol. 2 (County CO-3522, 2000) — contains the track "Candy Girl"
