= Colonial Hall =

Historic house in Tennessee, United States

- U.S. National Register of Historic Places
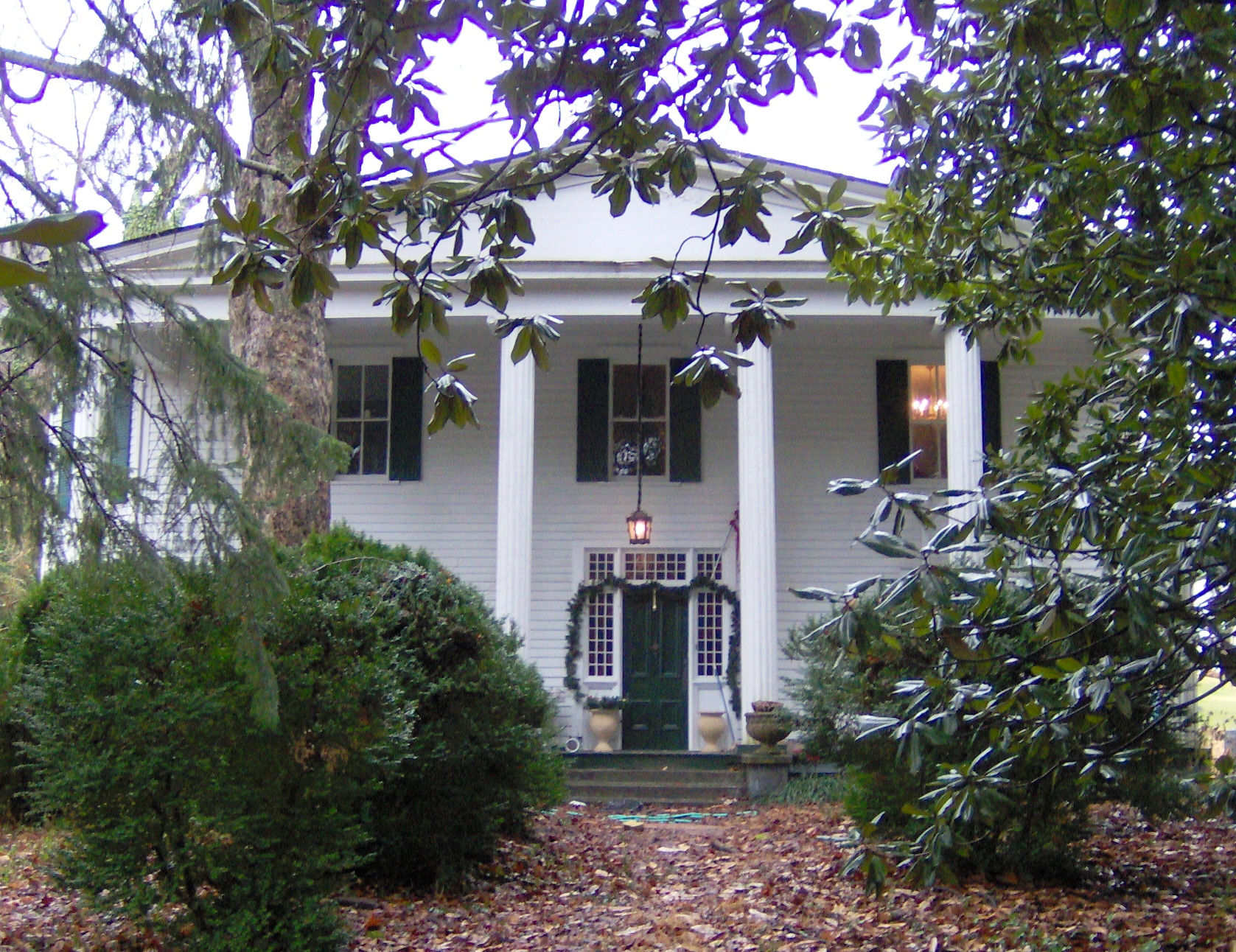
- Colonial Hall in 2010

- Location within Tennessee Location within the United States
- Location: Spring and Main Sts., Oliver Springs, Tennessee
- Coordinates: 36°2′39″N 84°20′26″W
- Area: 6 acres (2.4 ha)
- Built: 1799
- Architect: Winters, Maj. Moses C.
- Architectural style: Dog-Trot
- NRHP reference No.: 75001774
- Added to NRHP: September 11, 1975

Colonial Hall is a historic mansion in Oliver Springs, Tennessee, United States.

== History ==
The two-story house was completed prior to 1799. It is the oldest house in Oliver Springs. It was built for Major Moses C. Winters.

In 1852, the house was purchased by Joseph Estabrook, who served as the fifth president of the University of Tennessee. It was later purchased by Major John Scott, followed by Eliza Gerding Hannah McFerrin, an heiress to coal mines, the widow of Confederate Major John Harvey Hannah and future wife of Dr. R. A. McFerrin, in 1886. The McFerrins lived here with their two sons, General Harvey H. Hannah and Gerald Gerding Hannah, and their daughter, Bernice McFerrin. They added a front porch in 1898. The house was inherited by their daughter, who married Lewis Vaughan Blanton.

== Architectural significance ==
It has been listed on the National Register of Historic Places since September 11, 1975.
