= Uncle Jimmy Thompson =

American singer-songwriter

- Born: Jesse Donald Thompson; January 1, 1848; Smith County, Tennessee, United States
- Died: February 17, 1931 (aged 83) Laguardo, Tennessee, United States
- Genres: Old-time music
- Instrument: Fiddle
- Years active: 1925–1931
- Labels: Columbia, Brunswick/Vocalion

Jesse Donald "Uncle Jimmy" Thompson (January 1, 1848 – February 17, 1931) was an American old-time fiddle player and singer-songwriter. He is best remembered as the first performer to play on Nashville's Grand Ole Opry (then called the WSM Barn Dance), appearing with founder and host George D. Hay on the evening of November 28, 1925. The positive response generated by Thompson's performance would be an important influence on the show's creative direction in its formative years. While Thompson made only a handful of recordings late in his life, his cantankerous and eccentric personality and his fiddle skills have made him one of the best-known icons of early country music.

== Early life ==
Thompson was born in Smith County, Tennessee (near the town of Baxter) in 1848. Around 1860, his family moved to Texas, and Thompson began playing fiddle shortly thereafter. He likely learned a number of tunes (including "Flying Clouds", which he recorded in 1930) from veterans returning from the American Civil War (1861–1865), and his fiddle style always showed a strong Texas influence. In the 1880s, Thompson moved back to Smith County, where he married his first wife. They stayed in Tennessee for about 20 years before they moved again to Texas. In 1907, Thompson gained regional fame as a fiddler when he won an eight-day fiddle contest in Dallas.

Thompson returned to Tennessee a few years after the Dallas contest, this time settling near Hendersonville, a town located a few miles northeast of Nashville. His first wife died shortly afterward, however, and around 1912 he married his second wife, Ella Manners. In 1916, Thompson and Ella moved to Laguardo, in Wilson County, Tennessee. Being too old to farm, Thompson purchased a Ford truck which he outfitted with a makeshift camper, and he and Ella spent the next several years travelling around the state, performing at various fairs and other gatherings. Thompson played fiddle while "Aunt Ella" buck-danced on a red rug. In 1923, Thompson drove all the way to Dallas, where he again captured first prize in the city's eight-day fiddle contest.

== The WSM Barn Dance years, 1925-1928 ==
In 1925, the National Life and Accident Insurance Company established WSM, the first radio station in Nashville that could reach a regional audience. In September of that year, WSM began airing rural musicians from the Nashville area, namely Humphrey Bate, Sid Harkreader, and Uncle Dave Macon. Realizing the popularity of old-time music, WSM hired George D. Hay, a Chicago radio announcer and host of the National Barn Dance on Chicago's WLS. Hay adapted his show's format to WSM, where it was to be called the WSM Barn Dance. For the show's initial airing on November 28, Thompson's niece, Eva Thompson Jones, who worked as piano accompanist for WSM at the time, suggested her uncle to Hay as his first guest.

Thompson's performance began at 8:00 that night, with Hay introducing Thompson and stating that Thompson would take requests from listeners. Phone calls and telegrams immediately began pouring into the station. At the end of the hour, Hay asked Thompson if he had done enough fiddling, to which Thompson replied, "a man don't get warmed up in an hour," and showed Hay the blue ribbon he had recently won at the eight-day fiddle contest in Dallas.

Thompson's performance on November 28 and his follow-up performances on WSM in subsequent weeks made him an instant celebrity. During this period, Hay issued a challenge to Maine fiddler Mellie Dunham, who had recently captured first prize in a nationwide fiddle contest held by automobile magnate Henry Ford. Dunham declined, prompting Thompson to say "he's affeared of me." Nevertheless, Ford held a second national contest in 1926, which Thompson entered. Thompson easily advanced through the early rounds to the contest's Tennessee state finals, which were held at the Ryman Auditorium in Nashville on the evening of January 19. Thompson outplayed five other finalists, including Lynchburg fiddler Uncle Bunt Stephens and a one-armed fiddler from Hartsville named Marshall Claiborne, to capture the state championship. In the contest's regional finals in Louisville, Kentucky the following day, however, Thompson failed to place in the top three, being ousted by both Stephens and Claiborne and a South Indiana fiddler named W.H. Elmore (Stephens went on to win the national contest).

== Later career ==
Thompson continued making appearances on Barn Dance (renamed the Grand Ole Opry in 1927) throughout 1926 and 1927, but as the show became more structured, Thompson's role was minimized. Hay grew impatient with Thompson's general unreliability, and the two bickered over such things as Thompson's penchant for drinking a jug of whiskey before each program to "lubricate" his playing arm, and Thompson's tendency to play well over his allotted time. In 1928, Thompson made only two appearances on the program.

In 1926, Thompson went to Atlanta, where he recorded two traditional tunes, "Billy Wilson" and "Karo" for Columbia Records. The latter, "Karo," is probably derived from the folk song "Flop-Eared Mule." Thompson's only other recording session occurred on April 5, 1930 in Knoxville, Tennessee, for Brunswick/Vocalion. This session produced the recording known as "Uncle Jimmy's Favorite Fiddlin' Pieces," a mini-interview conducted by producer Bill Brown in which Thompson plays "Flying Clouds" and "Leather Britches", and discusses whiskey and the violin's superiority over the guitar (the brief guitar solo was probably played by Willie Sievers of the Tennessee Ramblers).

Thompson died of pneumonia at his Laguardo home on February 17, 1931. Music historian Charles Wolfe notes that while Thompson's active career (1925–1931) was relatively short, it was "one of the most potent" in the history and development of country music, and that the photographs of Thompson seated with his fiddle before a WSM microphone are among the Grand Ole Opry's most enduring images. Thompson claimed to have known over a thousand fiddle tunes, and once boasted he could "fiddle the bugs off a tater vine." According to Wolfe, an analysis of Thompson's last recordings show a fiddle player of "great ability."

Thompson's fiddle was still in working condition as of 2025 and was used for the opening number to the Grand Ole Opry's 100th anniversary radio broadcast on November 28, 2025, with Ricky Skaggs playing the instrument.

== Discography ==
Catalog number	Title	Record label
15118 D	Billy Wilson/Karo	Columbia Records
Vocalion 5456	Uncle Jimmy’s Favorite Fiddlin’ Pieces/Lynchburg	Conqueror Records
