= Tennessee Ramblers =

Tennessee Ramblers may refer to:

- Tennessee Ramblers (Tennessee band), an old-time string band led by the Sievers family that recorded for Brunswick/Vocalion in 1928 and 1929
- Tennessee Ramblers (North Carolina band), a country music group formed by Dick Hartman that recorded for the Bluebird label in 1935
