= OSHS =

OSHS may refer to:

- Ocean Springs High School, Ocean Springs, Mississippi, United States
- Office of Safe and Healthy Students, an agency of the United States Department of Education
- Olathe South High School, Olathe, Kansas, United States
- Old Saybrook Senior High School, Old Saybrook, Connecticut, United States
- Oliver Springs High School, Oliver Springs, Tennessee, United States
- Oscar F. Smith High School, Chesapeake, Virginia, United States
