= Robertsville =

Robertsville may refer to:

Places in the United States

- Robertsville, Connecticut
- Robertsville, Missouri
- Robertsville, New Jersey
- Robertsville, Ohio
- Robertsville, Tennessee
- Robertsville State Park, a state park in Missouri

Places in Canada

- Robertsville, Ontario
- Robertsville, Frontenac County, Ontario
