= Col. Gideon Morgan House =

Historic house in Tennessee, United States

- U.S. National Register of Historic Places
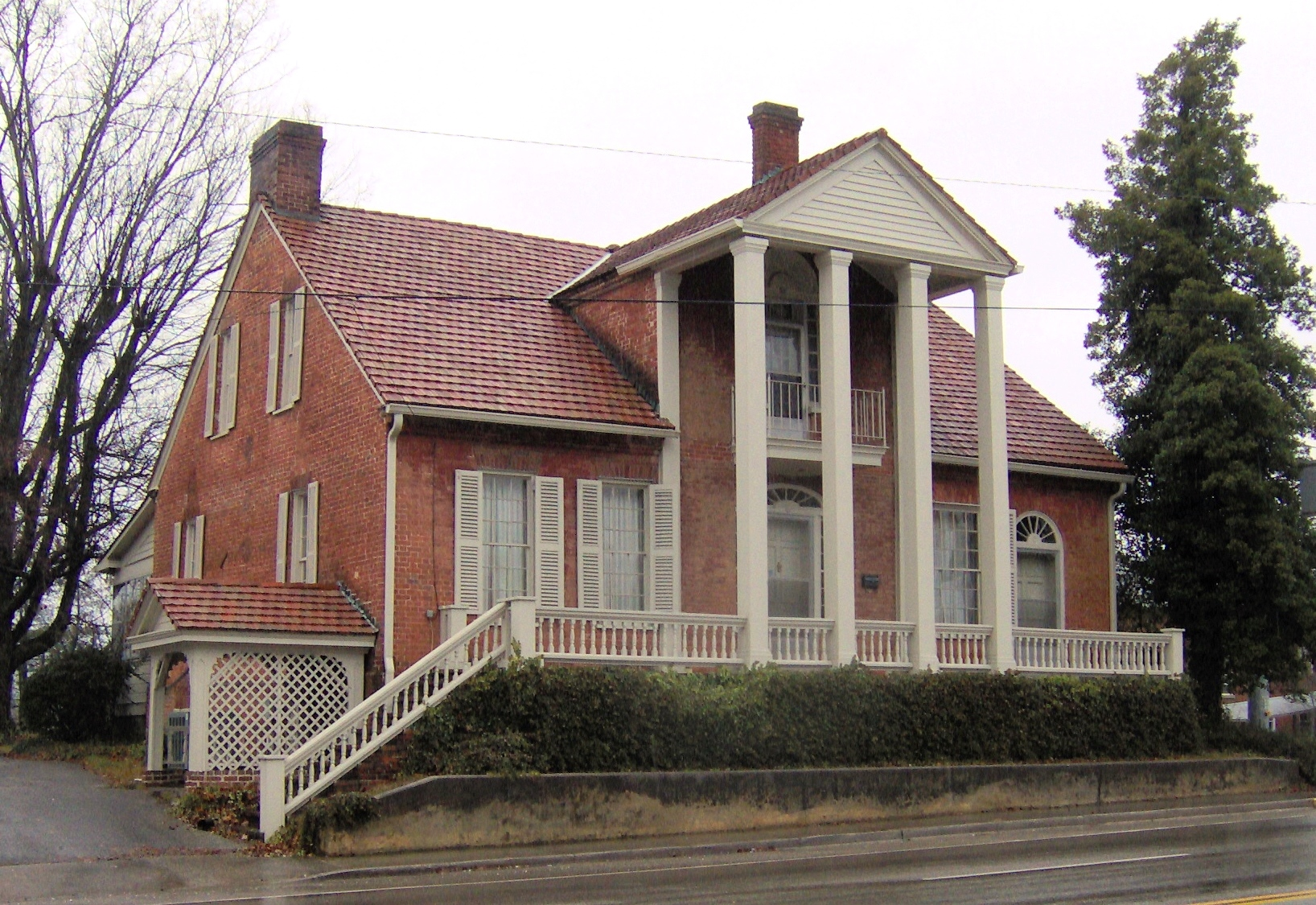
- The Col. Gideon Morgan House in 2010

- Location within Tennessee Location within the United States
- Location: 149 Kentucky St., Kingston, Tennessee
- Coordinates: 35°52′20″N 84°30′59″W
- Area: less than one acre
- Built: 1810
- Architectural style: Federal
- NRHP reference No.: 83003060
- Added to NRHP: January 27, 1983

The Col. Gideon Morgan House is a historic house in Kingston, Tennessee.

== Description and history ==
The 2 1/2-story house was built from 1810 to 1813. It was designed in the Federal architectural style. It has been listed on the National Register of Historic Places since January 27, 1983.
