= Dr. Fred Stone Sr. Hospital =

- U.S. National Register of Historic Places
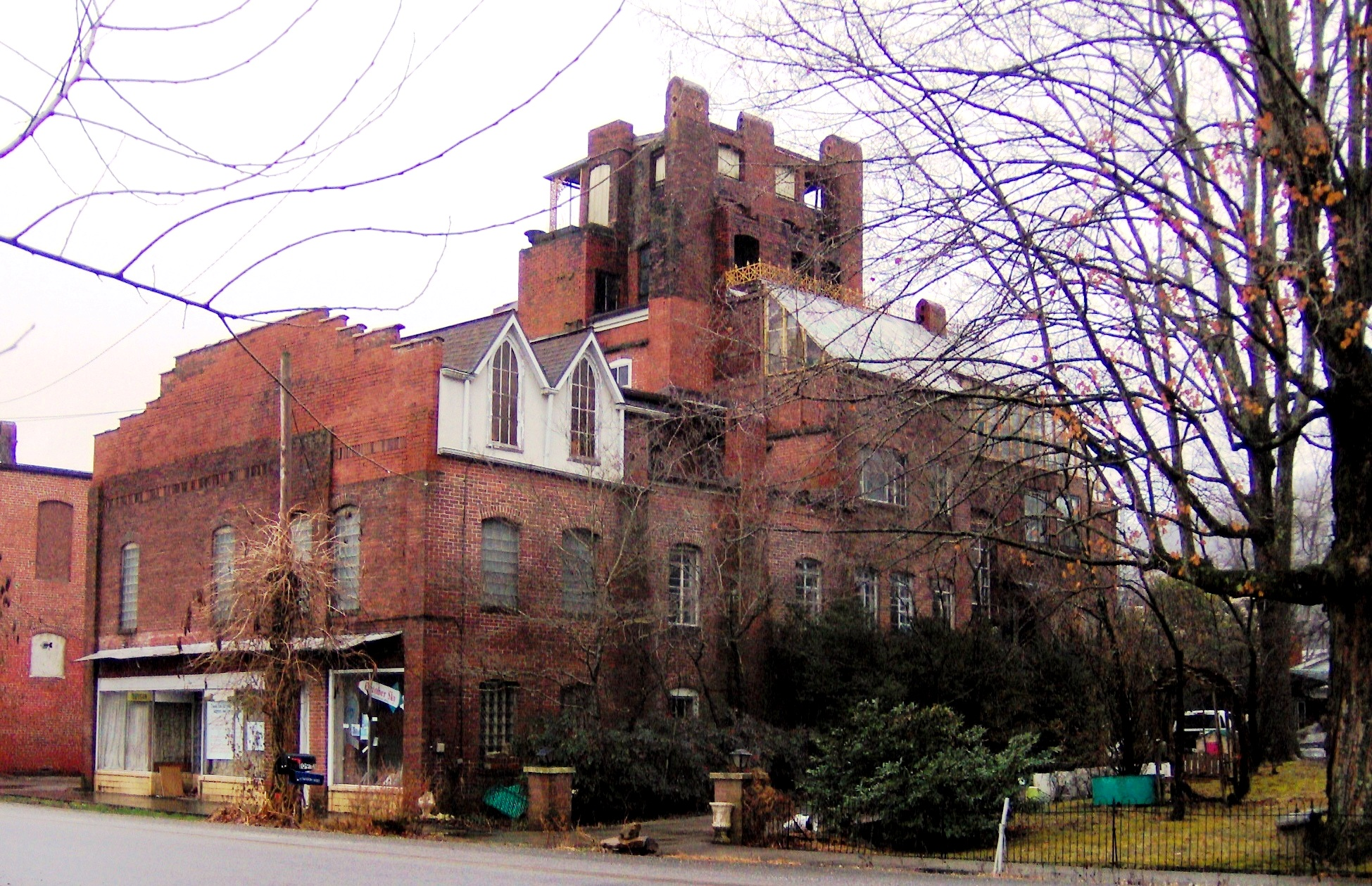
- Dr. Fred Stone Sr. Hospital

- Location within Tennessee Location within the United States
- Location: 105 Roane St.
- Nearest city: Oliver Springs, Tennessee
- Coordinates: 36°2′50″N 84°20′27″W
- Area: Less than one acre
- Architect: Dr. Fred Stone Sr.
- NRHP reference No.: 06001097
- Added to NRHP: November 29, 2006

The Dr. Fred Stone Sr. Hospital is a six-story brick structure in Oliver Springs, Tennessee. Noted for its castle-like appearance and eccentric, unplanned design, the building was home to a one-doctor hospital operated by retired U.S. Army physician Fred Stone Sr. (1887–1976) in the 1940s, 1950s, and 1960s. Stone delivered over 5,000 babies while working at the hospital, and expanded the building room-by-room, floor-by-floor in his spare time. In 2006, the building was added to the National Register of Historic Places for its association with the region's medical services history, namely the transition from rural country doctors to modern hospitals.

The grandson of a noted Claiborne County doctor, Stone spent his teen years drifting around the country before returning to East Tennessee to obtain his medical degree in 1916. Stone served as an American medical aide to the British Army during World War I, and in 1918 was awarded the British Military Cross. After travelling around the world, he returned to East Tennessee, where in the early 1940s he worked as an examiner for new Manhattan Project employees at Oak Ridge. In 1943, Stone purchased what was then a simple two-story building in Oliver Springs for use as a hospital, and spent the next three decades expanding it, adding multiple stories, hidden corridors, marble terraces, and a six-story central observation tower. In 1999, the building and its environs appeared in the film October Sky.

== Location ==
The Dr. Fred Stone Sr. Hospital is located in downtown Oliver Springs, about a block away from the Roane-Anderson county line. The NRHP-listed Colonial Hall is located just across the street to the south, and the NRHP-listed Oliver Springs Banking Company building is located just across the county line to the east. A contributing property in the hospital listing, known as the "Hayes House" after its builder, is located in a partially wooded lot adjacent to the hospital.

== History ==
=== Fred Stone Sr. biography ===
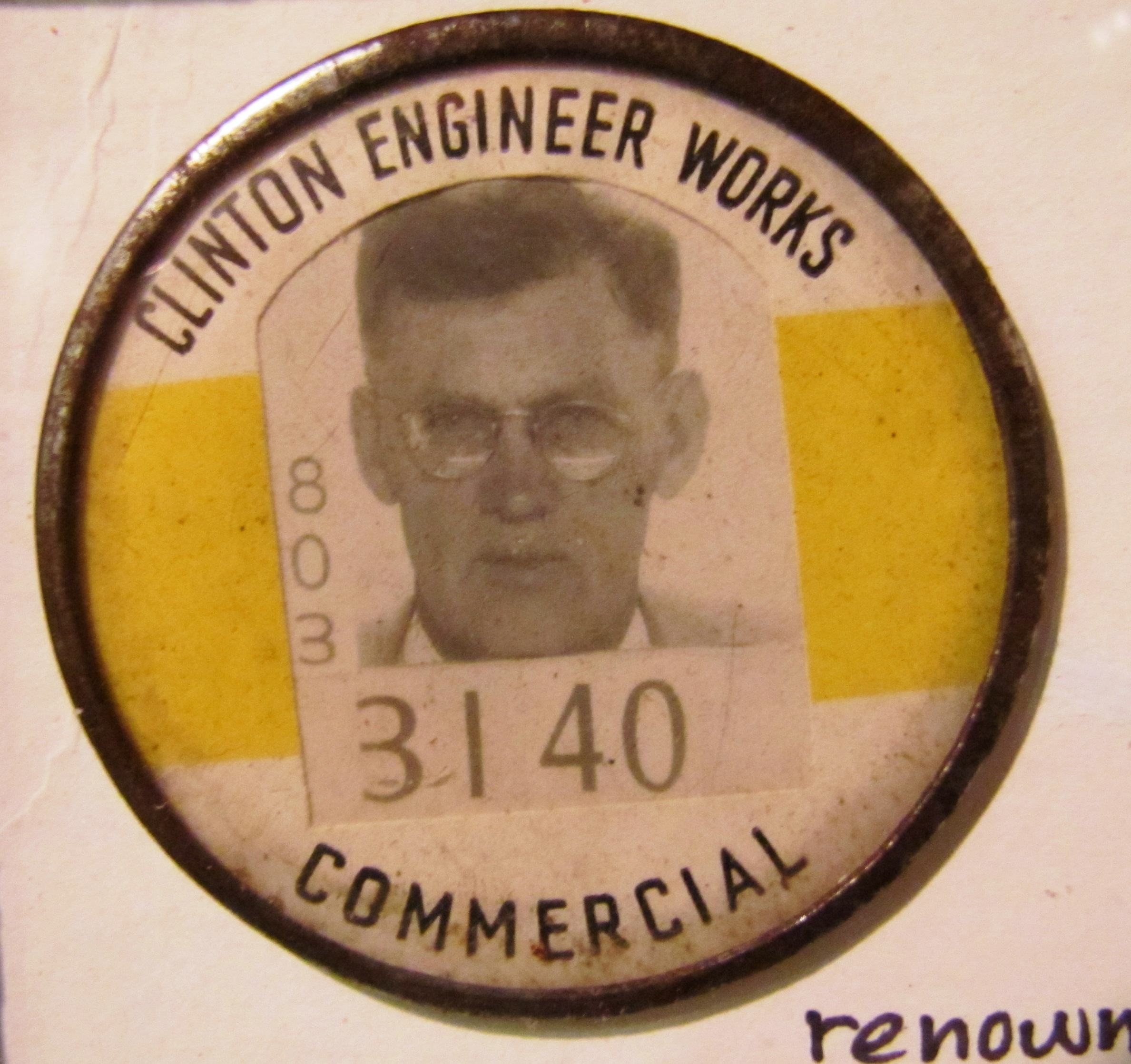
Stone's Oak Ridge security badge

Fred Oscar Stone was born in Claiborne County, Tennessee, in 1887. His grandfather, Samuel Stone, was a country doctor, and accompanying his grandfather on calls as a child inspired Fred to seek a career in medicine later in life. At the age of 19, Fred moved to New Mexico to homestead a small plot of land, and within a few years had joined several relatives in Oregon, where he worked in hops vineyards.

Using money he had saved up, Stone returned to East Tennessee and enrolled in Lincoln Memorial University Medical School in Knoxville, from which he graduated in 1916. He briefly practiced medicine in Loyston, Tennessee, before joining the U.S. Army Medical Corps at the height of World War I. Stone was "loaned" to the British Fourth Battalion Regiment, and was awarded the British Military Cross for actions performed at Bucquoy in August 1918. After the war, Stone served in various places around the world, including the Philippines and India, before retiring from the Army in 1937.

After retirement, Stone purchased a large plot of land in Claiborne County, where he began building a large stone mansion embedded into a cliff-side overlooking Bear Creek (the mansion burned in 1975). In 1942, Stone was hired by Stone & Webster— the firm which built the Manhattan Project facilities at Oak Ridge— as an examiner for its new employees, a task Stone carried out from a makeshift clinic at the city's Elza Gate. After World War II, Stone devoted himself primarily to his Oliver Springs hospital, which he purchased in 1943, seeing patients at all hours of the day and expanding the building room-by-room in his spare time. He died in 1976.

=== Structure history ===
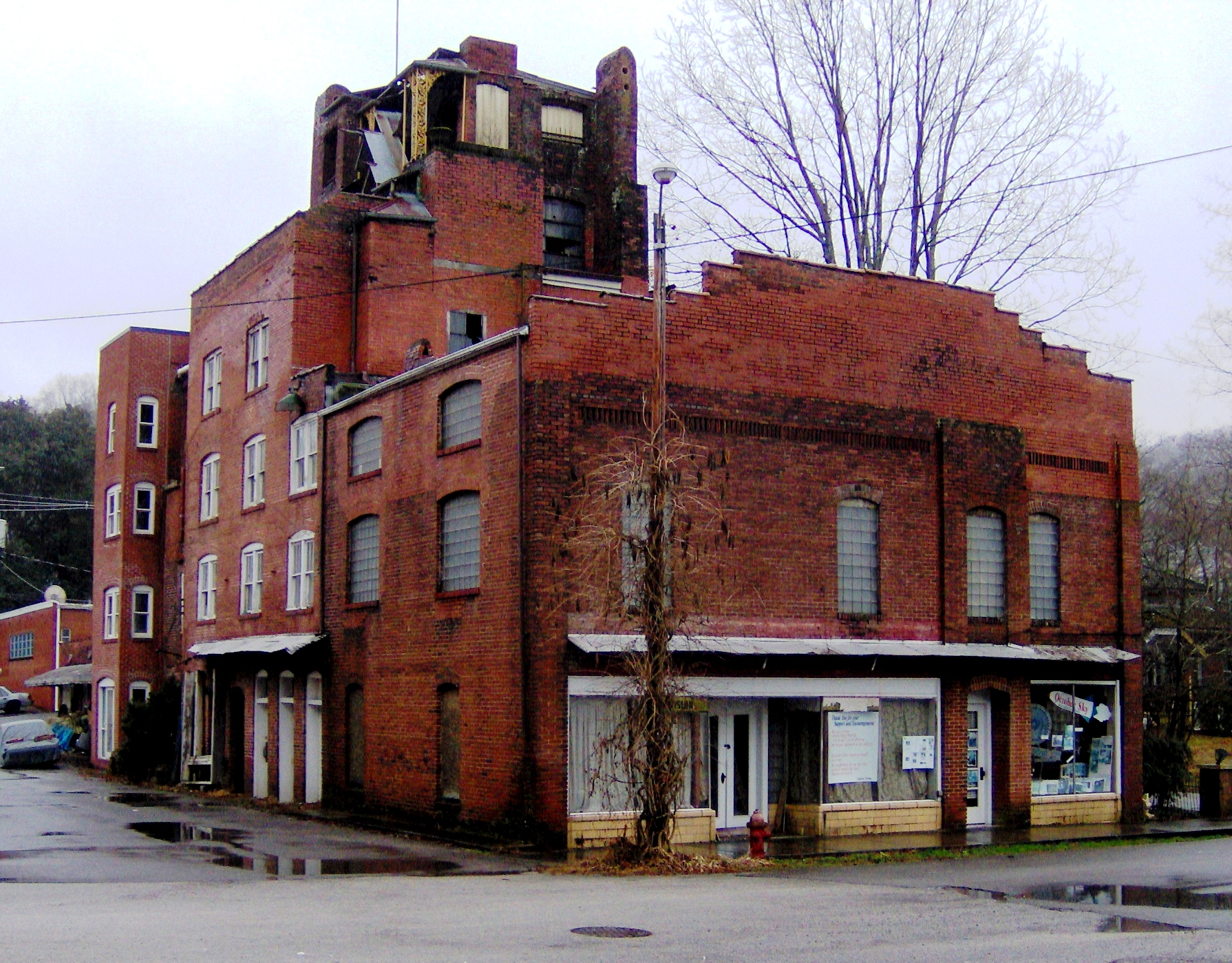
The hospital's facade, with the original structure discernible from the brick types; Stone Alley is on the left

In the early 1900s, Oliver Springs was a small mountain town focused primarily on a lavish mineral springs resort known as the Oliver Springs Resort Hotel and coal mining activities at the base of the Cumberland Plateau to the west. A German-born physician, Henry Sienknecht, acquired a plot of land that included the later Stone hospital lot, and opened a general store which still stands near the hospital. When Sienknecht died in 1916, his daughter Ella and son-in-law Dr. Jesse Thaxton Hayes inherited the property. Around 1920, Hayes built a two-story clinic (the original section of the Stone hospital) on this property, and in 1924 he and his wife built a Bungalow-style house (the Hayes House) in the adjacent lot.

While inspecting the roof of his clinic in 1940, Hayes slipped and fell, and died shortly thereafter. His heirs sold the clinic and house to Charles and Alice Davis in 1940, and the Davises in turn sold the clinic (but not the house) to Stone in 1943. Stone immediately began expanding the building. He hired a brick-mason named Joe Chittum and mobilized idle nurses and relatives to mix mortar and aide in bricklaying. By 1946, the building rose five stories at its highest point. As the building continued to grow, Stone modified its design to fit around an old Maple tree growing on the lot, giving the building's northeast corner its awkward appearance. The building's central six-story tower, completed in 1949, briefly served as a Civil Defense lookout for the nearby atomic energy installations at Oak Ridge.

By the time of Stone's death, the building, which originally covered 1,036 square feet (96.2 m^{2}), had grown to over 4,000 square feet (370 m^{2}). The building's subsequent owners removed the Maple tree and added fiberglass covers to parts of the roof to prevent water leakage. An architect named Charles Tichy eventually acquired the building, and began restoring it in the early 1990s. Several scenes from the 1999 film October Sky (which was set in a West Virginia mining town) were shot in Oliver Springs, including a scene in the alley adjacent to the hospital. The nearby Sieknecht store still bears the "Olga Coal Company" facade from the movie.

== Design ==
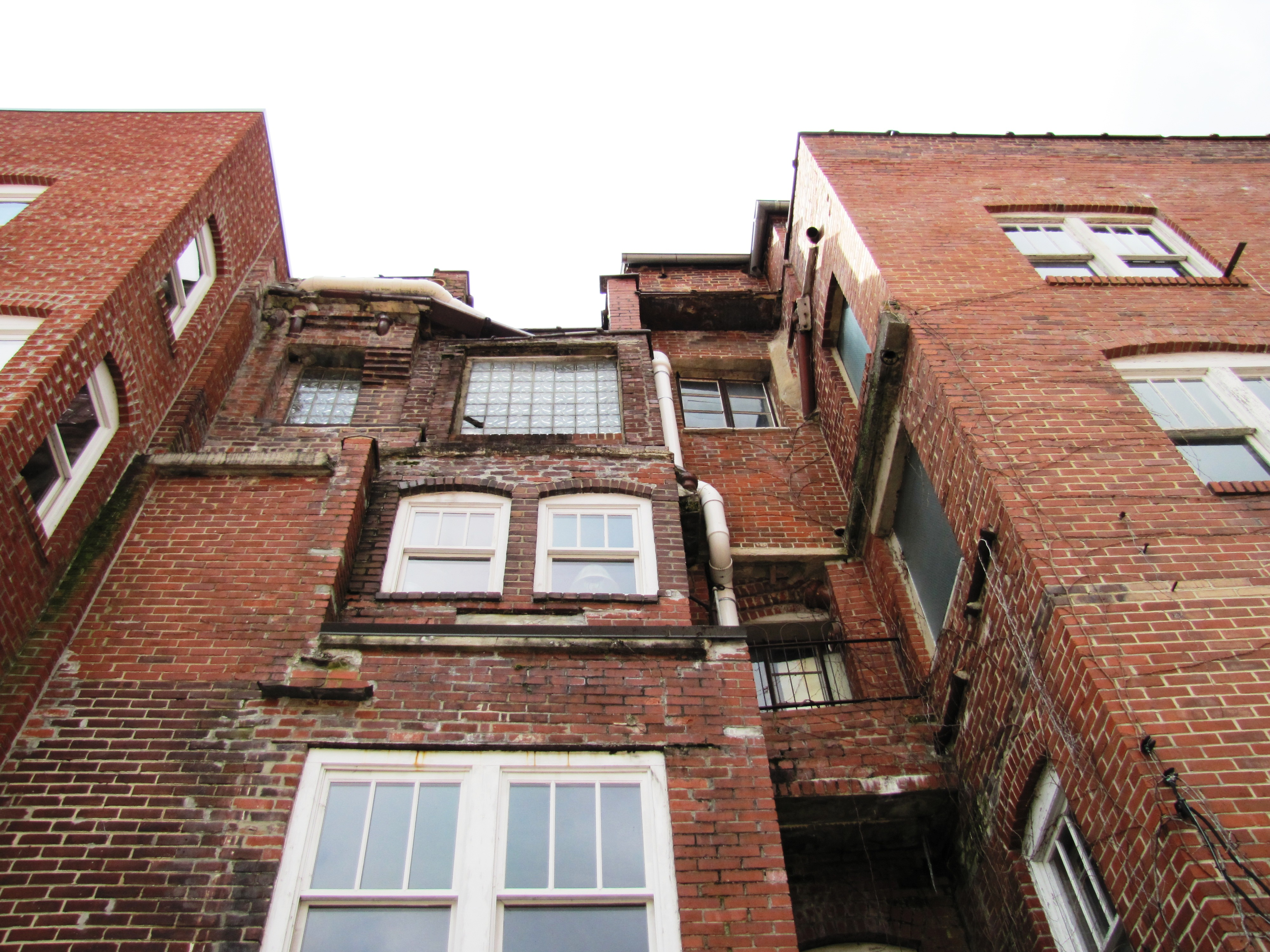
Irregularly built northeast wall

The Dr. Fred Stone Sr. Hospital can be roughly divided into three sections— the "front" section, containing the original 1920 structure built by Hayes, the "middle" section surrounding the tower, and the four-story "rear" section. The original 1920 structure measured 28 by 37 feet (8.5 by 11.3 m), and consisted of a typical shop front with a recessed entrance flanked by two windows. In 1943, Stone extended it from 37 feet (11 m) to 43 feet (13 m) to include a second shop front, with its own window and entrance, and united the two shops with a stepped-gabled facade. Two dormer windows were added to the third story of this section's southwest wall in the 1980s.

The middle section rises to four stories, with various decks and terraces rising to five stories, and the central 20-by-20-foot (6.1 by 6.1 m) tower rising to six stories. There are six doors at the northeast base (facing Stone Alley) of the middle section, some accessing the first floor, others accessing stairways leading to the upper floors. A brick between stories five and six in the tower is stamped with "1946," and a marble slab in the tower's open-air pavilion is stamped with "1949," giving some idea of the dates of completion. Along with the tower, the roof of the middle section consists of a series of irregular marble terraces, some accessed by exterior stairways, and some accessed by interior stairways.

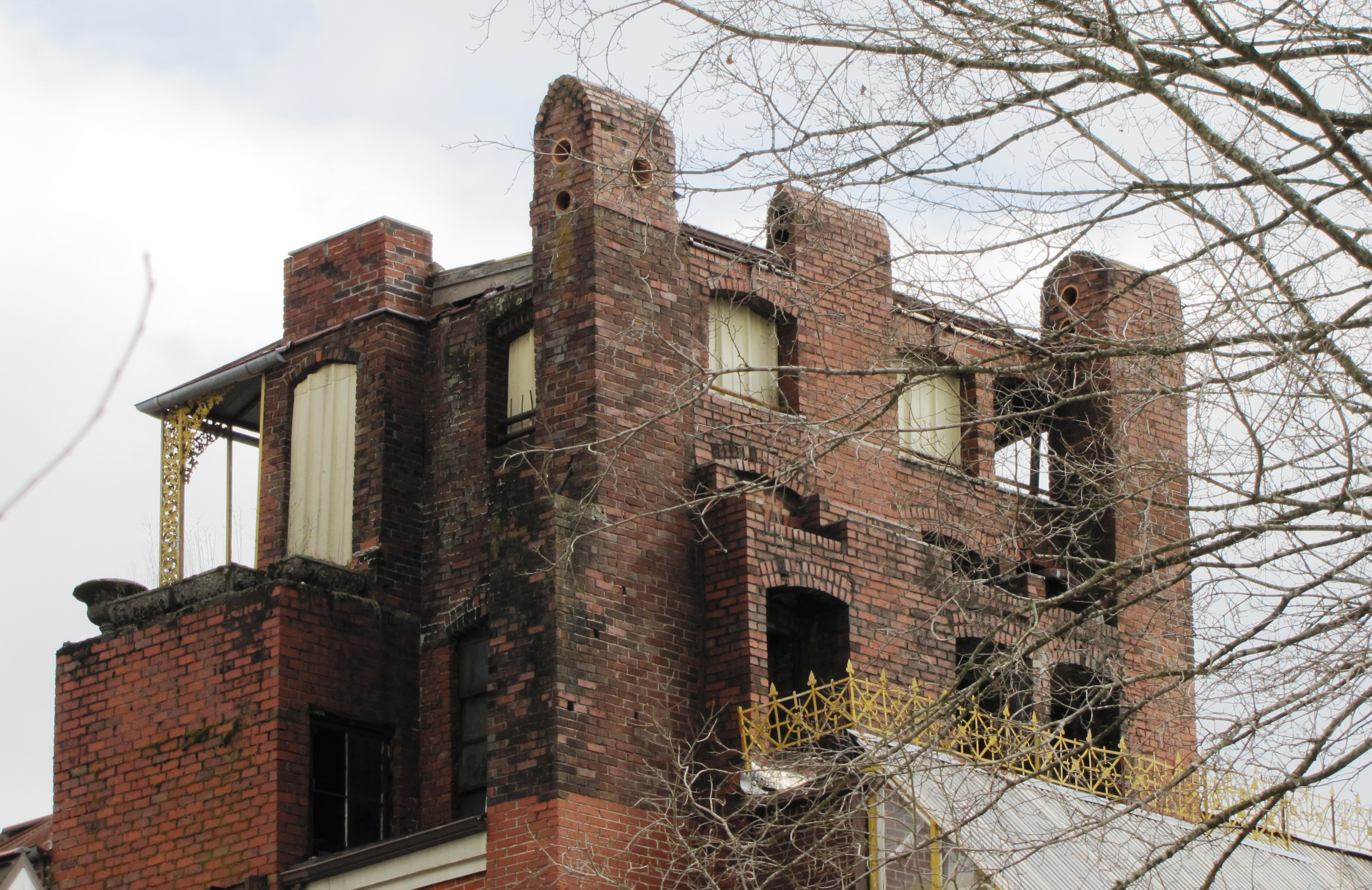
Detail of the observation tower

The building's rear section rises to four stories, but the southwestern one-third of this section rises to three stories topped by a terrace (currently covered with protective fiberglass). Part of the rear section's northeast wall is recessed, as Stone attempted to build around a Maple tree growing on the lot. The walls of this section were set irregularly to accommodate the tree's branches.

Most of the building's interior rooms are small and simple. Fireplaces typically consist of brick or marble hearths with brick mantels. Some of the interior walls contain windows, revealing that they were once exterior walls. Most of the interior walls are plastered, although some contain clay tiles. Upper floors are accessed via wood or marble staircases, although the building contains a crude rope-and-pulley elevator. Aside from the two storefronts (which were rented as commercial space), the first floor was essentially a basement and garage. The second floor contained the clinic space and the Stone family's residential space.

=== Hayes House ===
The Hayes House, located in an adjacent lot southwest of the hospital, is the National Register listing's only other contributing structure. The Bungalow-style house, built by Dr. J. T. Hayes in 1924, is a one-and-one-half store brick structure with a green-painted tiled hip roof. Two sets of dormer windows rise from the front of the roof (facing Roane Street). The first floor of the house contains a central living room, dining room, kitchen, and three bedrooms. The second floor contains a bedroom and an attic.
