= Robertsville, Tennessee =

Former community in Tennessee, USA

Coordinates: 36°00′49″N 84°16′28″W

Robertsville was a farming community in Anderson County, Tennessee, that was disbanded in 1942 when the area was acquired for the Manhattan Project. Its site is now part of the city of Oak Ridge, Tennessee.

Robertsville was established in 1804 by a merchant named Collins Roberts, who received a 4,000-acre (16 km^{2}) land grant. The community was located on the Old Emory Coach Road, and a natural spring in Robertsville called Cross Spring was a rest stop where travelers on that road could water and rest their horses. During the 19th century, Robertsville was the site of a slave block; during the Civil War, however, community residents generally supported the Union cause.

Notable residents included Swiss-German immigrant Henry Sienknecht, a Confederate Army physician who practiced medicine in Robertsville for several decades after the Civil War before moving in 1890 to Oliver Springs, where he operated a store.

The community existed until 1942, when the United States government acquired the land as a part of the Manhattan Project. The residents of Robertsville were displaced, along with the residents of several other communities. Robertsville is now in the residential and commercial portion of the city of Oak Ridge.

The present Robertsville Middle School is located on the site of the old Robertsville High School, which was built in about 1915. The high school gymnasium was retained to become the middle school's gym. Collins Roberts is buried in the Robertsville Baptist Cemetery. In the 1930s Cross Spring was dammed by a local farmer to form a small lake that the Army Corps of Engineers lined with concrete during World War II to convert it into a large swimming pool. The site of the lake is still the location of Oak Ridge's outdoor municipal swimming pool.

== See also ==
- Elza, Tennessee
