= I'm Alabama Bound =

Song
- Published: 1909
- Genre: Ragtime
- Composer(s): Robert Hoffman

"I'm Alabama Bound" is a ragtime melody composed by Robert Hoffman in 1909. Hoffman dedicated it to an M. T. Scarlata. The cover of its first edition, published by Robert Ebberman, New Orleans, 1909, advertises the music as "Also Known As The Alabama Blues" which has led some to suspect it of being one of the first blues songs. However, as written, it is an up-tempo rag (Rag Time Two Step) with no associated lyrics. The song has been recorded numerous times in different styles—both written and in sound recordings—with a number of different sets of lyrics.

Two recording artists claimed composing credits for the tune under two different titles and both with differing lyrics: Trixie Smith for "Railroad Blues" (Paramount 12262, 1925) and Ferdinand "Jelly Roll" Morton for "Don't You Leave Me Here" (Bluebird 10450, 1939). In addition, Lead Belly also recorded another well-known version of "I'm Alabama Bound", in 1940.

== History ==
Chorus of Pike's "I Hab Leff Alabama", 1849.

The earliest lyrics expressing the sentiment found in some of the later songs are found in a minstrel song, "I Hab Leff Alabama", written by Marshall S. Pike and published in 1849. The chorus did not have the same melody, and was written in dialect.

The first lyrics actually recorded to the music were by Prince's Band (Columbia A-901) in November, 1909. The music was attributed to Hoffman and words to John J. Puderer, owners of a New Orleans sheet music publishing company. Charles Adams Prince was a popular march band leader of the day, performing cake-walks and military marches. Puderer was the proprietor of The Music Shop in New Orleans, who published Hoffman's sheet music. The verses, in rag-time, were pretty much the same as those found in later versions. The actual source of the lyrics is unclear, but they may have come out of a folk tradition.

John W. "Blind" Boone included a short section of "I'm Alabama Bound" in his "Southern Rag Medley No. Two (Strains from Flat Branch)." The sheet music, published by Allen Music Co., Columbia, Missouri, (copyright 1913), was transcribed from Boone's piano roll which he recorded for the QRS company in 1912.

Alan Lomax attested to words found in his 1934 collection of "Alabama Bound" as being found in Newman I. White's Negro Folk-Songs (1915–1916). White's fragments were not set to music. Alan Lomax's "Alabama Bound", collected from prisoners in Texas, Louisiana, and Mississippi, contains verses including the words "Alabama bound".

Trixie Smith's 1925 "Railroad Blues" contains lyrics with "I'm Alabama bound".

The Tennessee Ramblers' 1928 recording "Preacher Got Drunk and Laid His Bible Down" contains the chorus with the words "Alabama bound". The Ramblers' banjo player, James "Mack" Sievers, claimed to have learned the song from an African-American blues musician in Knoxville, Tennessee.

Jelly Roll Morton's 1939 "Don't You Leave Me Here" has verses including "Alabama bound".

Lead Belly recorded perhaps the best-known version of "I'm Alabama Bound" ("Alabama Bound", Victor 27268, 1940). In the 1960s, the Charlatans recorded a version of "Alabama Bound" based on Lead Belly's in their San Francisco psychedelic style. Lonnie Donegan released a version named as "I'm Alabamy Bound" on his 1956 Pye 10" LP Showcase, which reached no. 26 in the UK Singles Chart.

Odetta released a version of "Alabama Bound" on the 1956 Tradition label Odetta Sings Ballads and Blues, featuring folk songs, spirituals and blues.

== Recorded versions ==
Date	Artist	Title	Label
1909	Prince's Band	"I'm Alabama Bound" (instr.)	Columbia A-0901
1924	Paul Whiteman & His Orchestra	"Alabamy Bound" (instr.)	Victor 19557
1925	Charlie Jackson	"I'm Alabama Bound"	Paramount 12289
1925	Trixie Smith	"Railroad Blues" †	Paramount 12262
1927	Charlie Johnson's Original Paradise Ten	"Don't You Leave Me Here" (instr.)	Victor 20653
1929	Henry Thomas	"Don’t Leave Me Here" †	Vocalion 1443
1938	Delmore Brothers	"I'm Alabama Bound"	Bluebird 8264
1939	Jelly Roll Morton	"Don't You Leave Me Here" †	Bluebird 10450
1940	Louis Jordan & His Tympani 5	"I'm Alabama Bound"	Decca 7723
1940	Lead Belly & The Golden Gate Quartet	"Alabama Bound"	Victor 27268
† These songs only partially have "I'm Alabama bound" lyrics.

== See also ==
- List of train songs

== Bibliography ==
- Boone, John W. "Blind Boone's Southern Rag Medley No. Two: Strains From The Flat Branch". Allen Music Co., 1913. (Sheet music)
- Cohen, Norm. Long Steel Rail: The Railroad in American Folksong. University of Illinois Press, 2000. ISBN 0-252-06881-5
- Hoffman, Robert. "I'm Alabama Bound". Robert Ebberman, 1909. (Charles H. Templeton, Sr. Sheet Music Collection–Mississippi State University)
- Lomax, John A. and Alan Lomax. American Ballads and Folk Songs. Dover Publications (reprint), 1994 [1934]. ISBN 0-486-28276-7
- Pike, Marshall S. "I Hab Leff Alabama". The Harmoneons: New and Original Melodies Sung by Them at Their Principal Concerts, pp. 3–5. A & J.P. Ordway, 1849. (Library of Congress)
- Waltz, Robert B; David G. Engle. "Alabama Bound ". The Traditional Ballad Index: An Annotated Bibliography of the Folk Songs of the English-Speaking World. Hosted by California State University, Fresno, Folklore, 2007.
- Wolfe, Charles K. Notes to Rural String Bands of Tennessee (p. 7) [CD liner notes]. County Records, 1997.
