= Oliver Springs High School =

Location
- 317 Roane Street; Oliver Springs, Tennessee; United States; 36.0423°N 84.3472°W

Information
- School type: Public, First
- Established: 1930
- School district: Roane County Schools
- Principal: Steve Branham
- Teaching staff: 17.00 (FTE)
- Grades: 9th – 12th
- Enrollment: 284 (2023-2024)
- Student to teacher ratio: 16.71
- Colors: Purple and Gold
- Mascot: Bobcat
- Website: https://oshs.roaneschools.com/o/oshs
- Oliver Springs High School Bobcat

Oliver Springs High School (OSHS) is the Roane County high school operated by Roane County Schools (Tennessee) that serves the city of Oliver Springs, Tennessee. The campus of 6.6 acres (2.7 ha) is located next to Arrowhead Park. Some of the park's facilities are used for school extracurricular programs. The school is STEAM certified. The school has 44 faculty for a student-teacher ratio at Oliver Springs High School of 21:1.
