= Roane County Courthouse (Tennessee) =

- Old Roane County Courthouse
- U.S. National Register of Historic Places
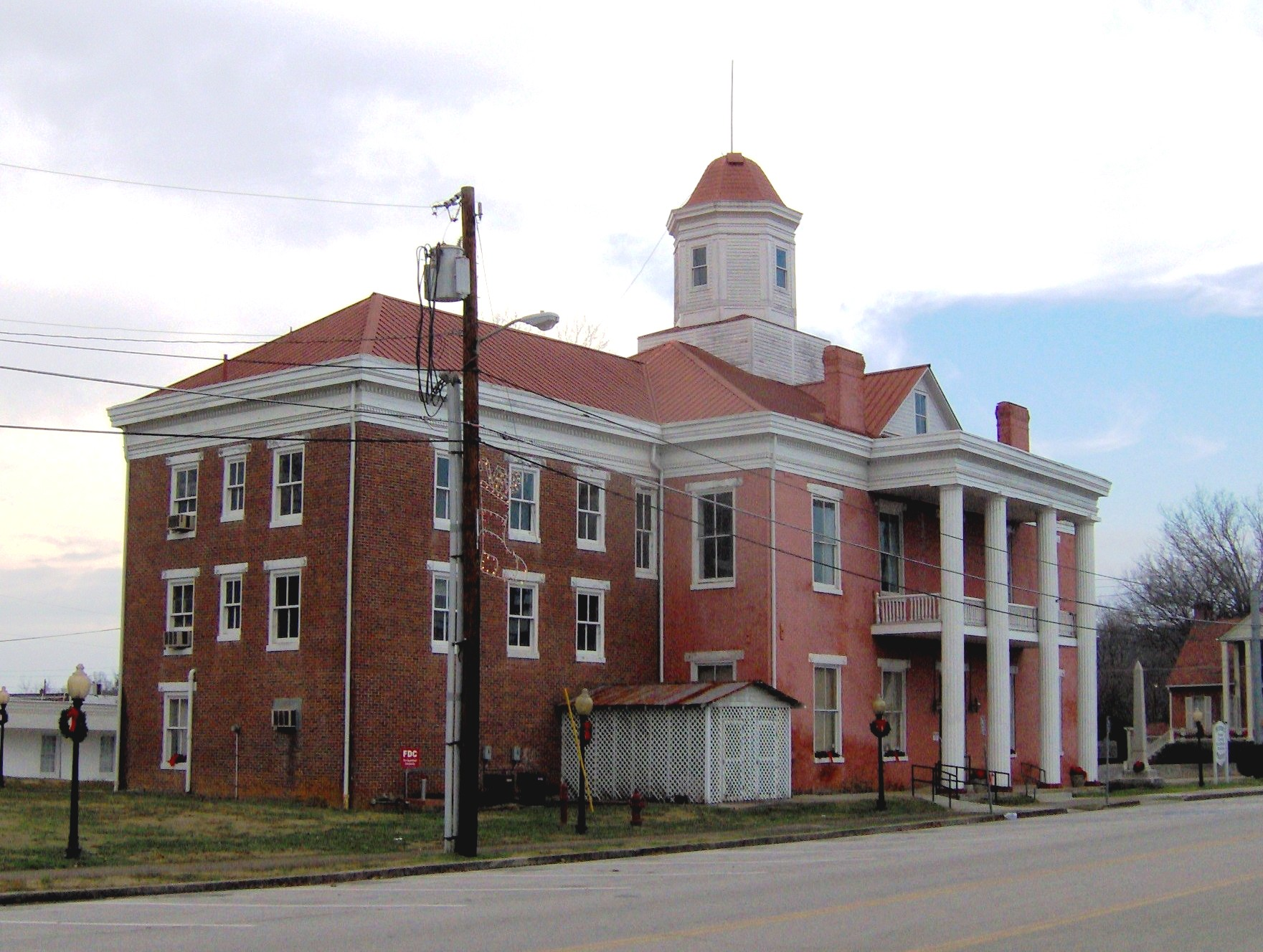
- The old Roane County Courthouse

- Location within Tennessee Location within the United States
- Location: Kentucky Ave., Kingston, Tennessee
- Coordinates: 35°52′18″N 84°30′57″W
- Area: 3 acres (1.2 ha)
- Architect: Lowery, John D.; Fisher, Augustus O.
- Architectural style: Greek Revival
- NRHP reference No.: 71000829
- Added to NRHP: July 14, 1971

The old Roane County Courthouse building in Kingston, Tennessee, the county seat of Roane County. Built in the 1850s, it is one of six remaining antebellum county courthouses in the state of Tennessee.

The old courthouse was the county's second courthouse building, replacing the original brick courthouse built in 1803. Construction of the new courthouse was authorized by the Roane County Court in January 1853. A local newspaper reported on November 25, 1854, that the building was "nearly completed," but records suggest that it was not ready for occupancy until about 1856.

Architects for the building's design were Augustus O. Fisher and Frederick B. Guenther. Fisher was from a family that was active in the building trade in southwest Virginia and east Tennessee. Guenther, who was born in Dresden, Germany, had arrived in the United States in 1844 as an agent for a land company. He had been one of the founders of the town of Wartburg in nearby Morgan County, Tennessee, and had overseen the construction of several buildings in Wartburg. The courthouse is designed in the Greek Revival style with some influences of Federal architecture.

The material for the courthouse construction included locally grown lumber, stone from a local source, and bricks manufactured on the project site by African-American slaves.

The building was used as a courthouse until 1974, when Roane County's court and government offices were relocated to a new courthouse building on an adjacent site. The old courthouse currently houses a museum.

In 1971, the courthouse was added to the National Register of Historic Places.
