= Tennessee Ramblers (Tennessee band) =

- Also known as: Sievers Ramblers
- Origin: Clinton, Tennessee, U.S.
- Genres: Old-time
- Years active: 1922–1954
- Label: Brunswick/Vocalion
- Past members: William Sievers; James "Mack" Sievers; Willie Sievers; Walter McKinney; Jerry Taylor; J.T. Jones

The Tennessee Ramblers were an American old-time string band originally consisting of William "Fiddlin' Bill" Sievers (1875–1954) on fiddle, his son James "Mack" Sievers on banjo and vocals, daughter Willie Sievers (1909–1998) on guitar, and cousin Walter McKinney (d. 1960) on steel guitar. The band was one of the most popular performing groups in East Tennessee during the 1920s through the 1940s, gaining initial fame as a backing band in fiddle contests held at Market Hall in Knoxville, Tennessee, and later performing at fairs and other gatherings around the eastern United States. They recorded several sides for Brunswick/Vocalion in 1928 and 1929, which were issued on the Vocalion label. After the death of William Sievers in 1954, siblings James and Willie formed a Hawaiian music group known as Mack's Novelty Hawaiians. Willie Sievers' guitar solos recorded with the band in 1928 and 1929 are among the first by a female lead guitarist in Country music.

== Origins ==
William Sievers (the name is sometimes spelled "Seivers") was born in Elza, Tennessee (now part of Oak Ridge) in 1875 and worked as a barber in nearby Clinton, where James and Willie were born in 1904 and 1909, respectively. William's grandfather and mother had been fiddle players, and his children later recalled that most everyone in the family played an instrument of some sort. William's wife, Myrtle McKinney, occasionally sang with the band in its early years. Aside from his parents, William's influences included an obscure Knoxville fiddle player known as "Old Bill" Jones (Georgia fiddler Earl Johnson also claimed Jones as an influence) and a Knoxville blues group known as the "Kinser Brothers."

James Sievers began playing banjo with his cousin, Walter McKinney, in 1913, and learned much of his technique from a north Anderson County banjo player named Steve Cole. Willie initially took piano lessons, but quit after her instructor told her she would only learn an instrument by "playing it by ear." She took up guitar shortly thereafter, and would later go on to win several contests. Within a few years, James and his sister Willie were playing at school assemblies. The two developed what would become a lifelong interest in Hawaiian music during this period, at the same time learning old-time music their father taught them.

== Career ==
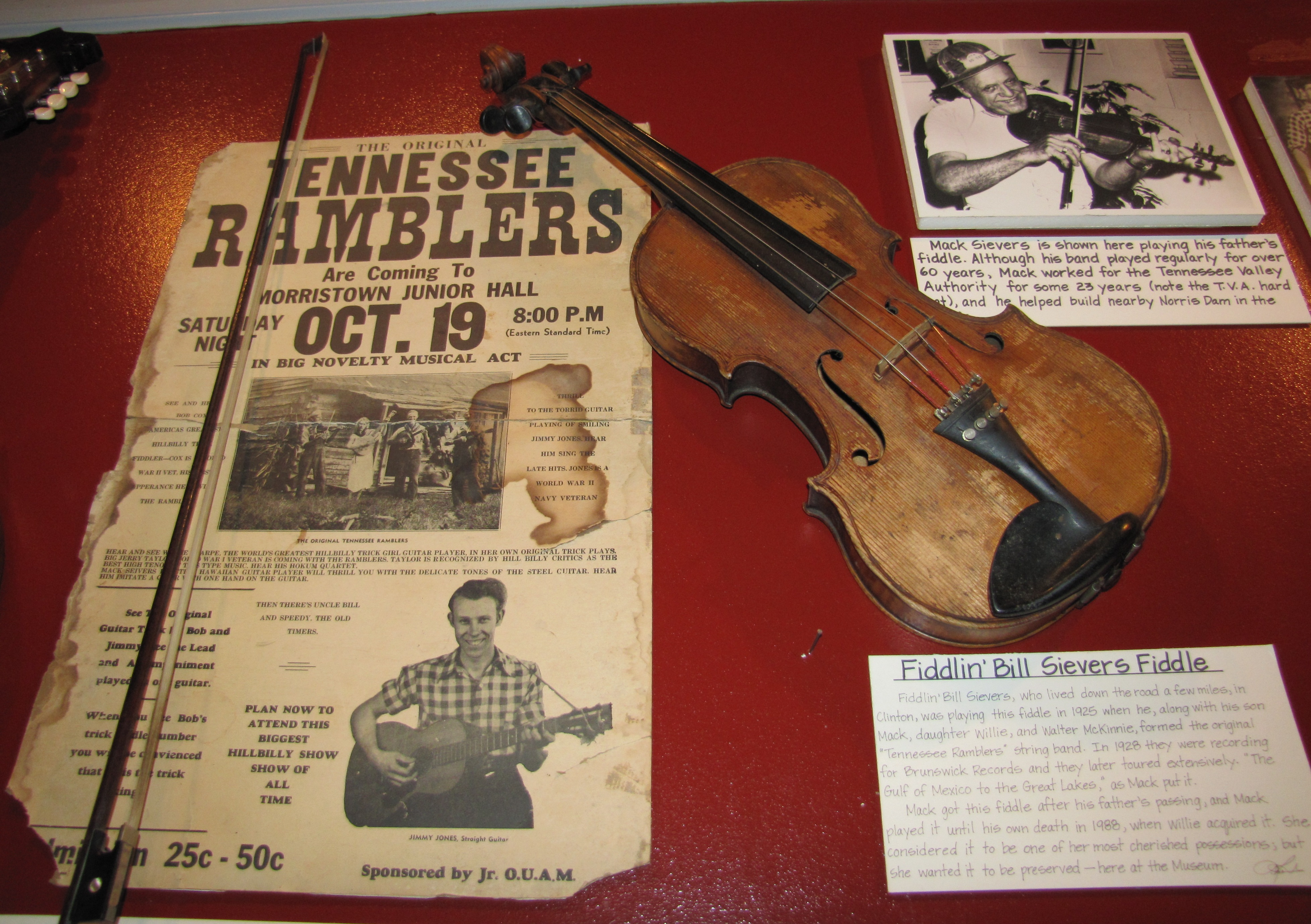
Tennessee Ramblers display at the Museum of Appalachia

William Sievers and his two children formed the Tennessee Ramblers in 1922. Walter McKinney typically appeared with the band playing steel guitar or Hawaiian guitar. James chose the name "Tennessee Ramblers" one night while they were driving to a show in Virginia. Throughout the 1920s, the band played at various venues across the eastern United States. They appeared on numerous radio stations, including WNOK in Knoxville, WLW in Cincinnati, and WFJC in Akron. At the fiddler conventions held by Frank Murphy at Market Hall in Knoxville, the Tennessee Ramblers were often paired with fiddlers Charlie Bowman and Earl Johnson.

In February 1928, the Tennessee Ramblers recorded their first record at a Brunswick session in Ashland, Kentucky. The recordings included "Cackling Pullet," which is based on the traditional tune "Hen Cackle," and "Fiddler Contest," which includes a guitar solo by Willie and a banjo solo by James. The session also produced "Preacher Got Drunk and Laid His Bible Down," which, as the chorus suggests, is based on the 1909 Robert Hoffman song, "I'm Alabama Bound."

In August 1929, Brunswick began the first of a series of large-scale recording sessions at the St. James Hotel in Knoxville. At this session, the Tennessee Ramblers recorded "Ramblers March," which was written by James, and "Garbage Can Blues," which they typically used to open performances. The group recorded several sides at Brunswick's follow-up Knoxville session in April of the following year, but no recordings from this session were released. Willie, however, is believed to have supplied the brief guitar solo on Uncle Jimmy's Favorite Fiddlin' Pieces, recorded at the same session by fiddler Uncle Jimmy Thompson of Grand Ole Opry fame.

== Later years ==
In 1931, Walter McKinney left the group and moved to the western United States. He was replaced by a mandolin player named Jerry Taylor, who played with the Ramblers throughout the 1930s. In 1938, the Ramblers also added J.T. Jones. The band continued playing at various gatherings around the region, including a large concert in St. Petersburg, Florida in 1932, and continued playing various venues in downtown Knoxville.

The Tennessee Ramblers disbanded with the death of William Sievers in 1954. The following year, James and Willie decided to focus on Hawaiian music, and formed a band called "Mack's Novelty Hawaiians." This band, which included Jo Adkins on drums, played regularly in downtown Knoxville through the 1970s.

Willie Sievers appeared briefly in the 1985 documentary Louie Bluie, performing alongside Blues musician Howard Armstrong (the "Louie Bluie" of the title).

== Discography ==
- Rural String Bands of Tennessee (County, 1997) — contains the band's 1928 recording, "Preacher Got Drunk and Laid His Bible Down"
