= Molyneux Chevrolet Company Building =

- Molyneux Chevrolet Company--Rockwood Fire Department Building
- U.S. National Register of Historic Places
- Location within Tennessee
- Location: 104 N. Chamberlain St., Rockwood, Tennessee
- Coordinates: 35.868749°N 84.687122°W
- Area: 1 acre (0.40 ha)
- Built: 1927
- Architectural style: two part commercial
- NRHP reference No.: 02000234
- Added to NRHP: March 20, 2002

The Molyneux Chevrolet Company Building, also known as the Rockwood Fire Department Building, is a historic building in Rockwood, Tennessee. It was built in 1927 and listed on the National Register of Historic Places in 2002.

It is an L-shaped two part commercial building. It was made of poured concrete walls, with concrete made by forms in a block-like pattern. It has decorative concrete pilasters. It was built to hold a flat-roofed fire hall in one bay on the eastern side, and the Molyneux Chevrolet Company in three other bays covered by a hipped roof.

The building still existed in 2011.
