= New Bethel Baptist Church (Oak Ridge, Tennessee) =

Historic church in Tennessee, United States

- U.S. National Register of Historic Places
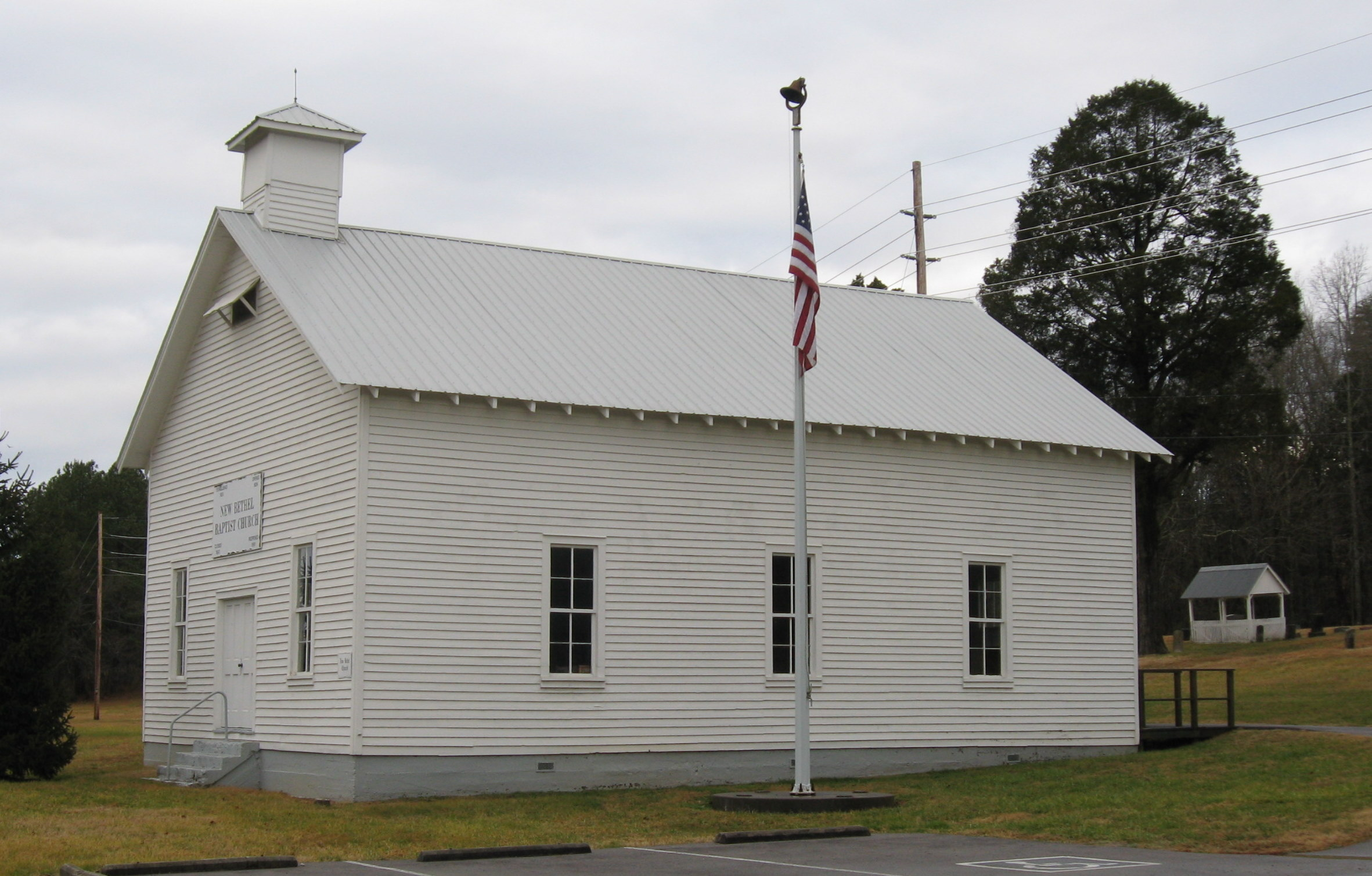

- Location within Tennessee Location within the United States
- Location: Bethel Valley Rd., Oak Ridge, Tennessee
- Coordinates: 35°56′1″N 84°18′19″W
- Area: 1.5 acres (0.61 ha)
- Built: 1900
- MPS: Oak Ridge MPS
- NRHP reference No.: 92000409
- Added to NRHP: May 06, 1992

New Bethel Baptist Church is a historic church on Bethel Valley Road in Oak Ridge, Tennessee.

The church was built in about 1900. One of the concrete steps that leads to the church entrance is inscribed with the date "1924," but this is not thought to be an original part of the church. The property was added to the National Register of Historic Places in 1992.

The church was founded in 1851. The church ceased operation in 1942 when the land was taken over by the U.S. federal government for Manhattan Project facilities. A large stone marker was erected behind the church in 1949 to commemorate the church and its congregation. It is inscribed "The church having been left in extended session in 1942, this monument was dedicated and the final church session closed at Memorial Day services May 29, 1949." The New Bethel Baptist Church is the only remaining structure from the pre-World War II community of Scarboro, Tennessee.

The church building is a frame, gable-front, three-bay structure with weatherboard siding, resting on a poured concrete foundation.
