= Elza, Tennessee =

Human settlement in Tennessee, United States of America

Coordinates: 36.052579°N 84.202976°W

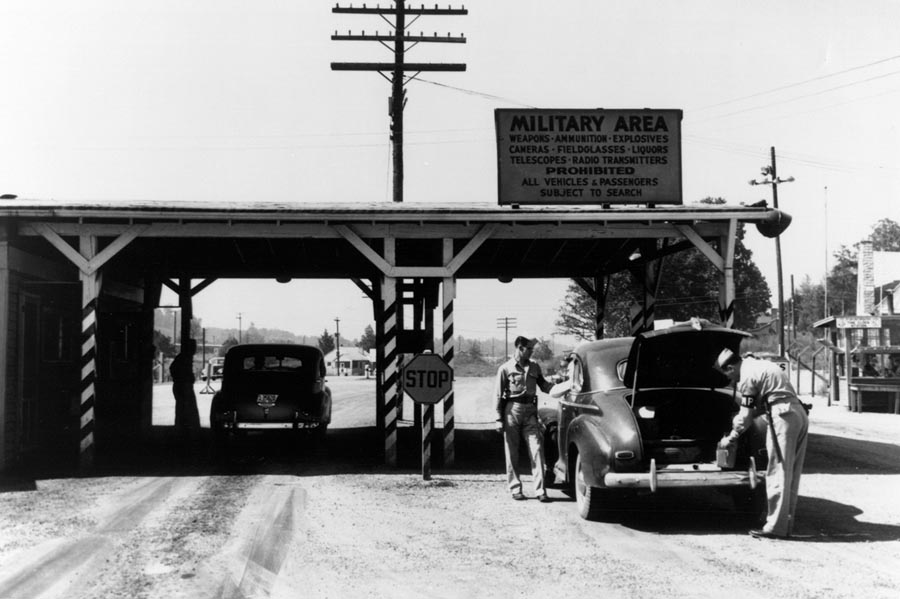
Military guards searching a car at the Elza security gate (photo by Ed Westcott)

Elza was a community in Anderson County, Tennessee, that existed before 1942, when the area was acquired for the Manhattan Project. Its site is now part of the city of Oak Ridge, Tennessee.

== History ==
Elza formed around a flagstop on the Louisville and Nashville Railroad. The community had a country store but no post office, instead receiving mail through the nearby community of Dossett. The community's name was derived from the surname of a railroad construction engineer named Paul Elza. Construction materials for a bridge over the Clinch River and an underpass near Dossett were marked "Elza" and were delivered to a shed near the railroad tracks.

William "Fiddlin' Bill" Sievers, an early country music guitarist and member of the Tennessee Ramblers band, was born in the Elza area in 1875.

=== Manhattan Project ===
When the federal government evaluated sites for the Manhattan Project facilities that ultimately were sited at Oak Ridge, the Oak Ridge site was described in internal memos as "near Elza." During World War II, Elza was the site of one of the security gates on the borders of the closed city of Oak Ridge. Located on the road from Clinton to Oak Ridge, the Elza gate was "the busiest and most public" of Oak Ridge's entrance gates. When the Oak Ridge townsite was first opened to outsiders in 1949, the gate-opening ceremony was conducted at the Elza gate.

== Community legacy ==
The Luther Brannon House, built in 1941 and razed in 2021, was a surviving structure associated with the Elza community. During World War II and for some time thereafter, the Manhattan Engineer District and the U.S. Atomic Energy Commission used several warehouses in the Elza area for storage of uranium ore and other materials. In the early 1990s, the U.S. Department of Energy cleaned up the site, where soil had been found to be contaminated by PCBs and uranium.
