= Mellie Dunham =

American fiddler (1853–1931)

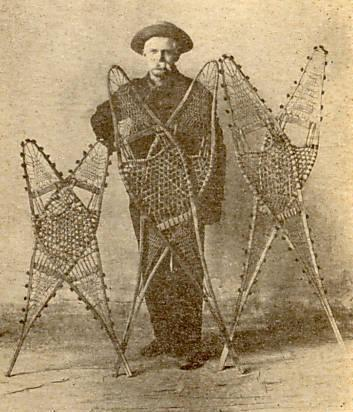
- Dunham, c. 1910

Background information
- Born: Alanson Mellen Dunham; July 29, 1853; Norway, Maine, U.S.
- Died: September 28, 1931 (aged 78) Lewiston, Maine, U.S.
- Genres: Country
- Occupation: Snowshoe maker
- Instrument: Fiddle

Mellie Dunham (July 29, 1853 – September 27, 1931) was an American fiddler.

== Biography ==
Dunham was born on July 29, 1853, in Norway, Maine, to Alanson Mellen Dunham and Christiana Bent. He came to prominence after he was invited to play for Henry Ford at his house in Dearborn, Michigan. Ford sent a Pullman car for Dunham and his wife, Emma "Gram" Dunham (née Richardson), because of Ford's love of country music. While Ford had invited 38 other fiddlers before Dunham, none received as much attention as Dunham did.

He was also a snowshoe maker, supplying 60 pairs of snowshoes to Commodore Robert Peary for an Arctic expedition.

Dunham died on September 27, 1931, aged 78, in Lewiston, Maine, after a two-week illness, and was buried in Pine Grove Cemetery, South Paris, Maine.
