= Oliver Springs, Tennessee =

- Town
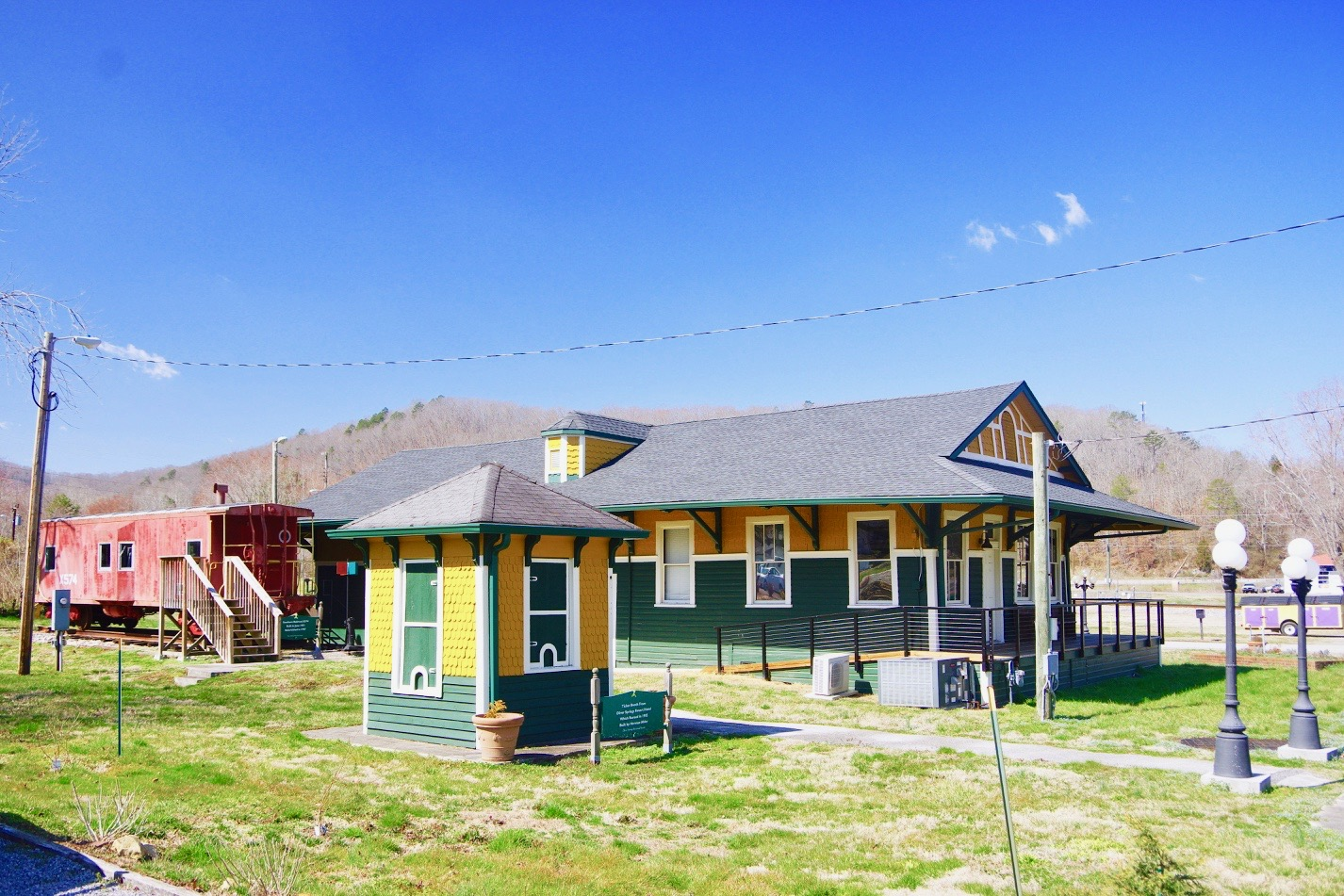
- Oliver Springs Depot, now the Oliver Springs Library

- Location of Oliver Springs in Anderson, Morgan, and Roane counties, Tennessee
- Coordinates: 36°02′23″N 84°19′43″W
- Country: United States
- State: Tennessee
- Counties: Anderson, Roane, Morgan
- Founded: 1821
- Incorporated: 1903
- Named for: Richard Oliver (early postmaster)

Government
  - Mayor: David Collett
  - City Manager: Connor Shivers

Area
  - Total: 5.78 sq mi (14.96 km^{2})
  - Land: 5.78 sq mi (14.96 km^{2})
  - Water: 0 sq mi (0.00 km^{2})
- Elevation: 902 ft (275 m)

Population (2020)
  - Total: 3,297
  - Density: 571.0/sq mi (220.45/km^{2})
- Time zone: UTC-5 (Eastern (EST))
  - Summer (DST): UTC-4 (EDT)
- ZIP code: 37840
- Area code: 865
- FIPS code: 47-55800
- GNIS feature ID: 2407045
- Website: www.oliversprings-tn.gov

Oliver Springs is a town in Anderson, Morgan, and Roane counties in the U.S. state of Tennessee. As of the 2020 census, Oliver Springs had a population of 3,297. It is included in the Harriman, Tennessee Micropolitan Statistical Area, which consists of Roane County.

== History ==
Oliver Springs was founded in 1821 as Winter's Gap. It was named for its first permanent settler of European descent, Major Moses Winters, who had settled in the area before 1799.

Before that time, the area around Oliver Springs had been used by Native Americans as a hunting ground and campsite. Natural mineral springs and abundant wildlife on Windrock Mountain encouraged Native Americans to stay. The springs, whose reputation for miraculous medicinal properties lasted until the 20th century, were called Tah-hah-lehaha, which meant "healing waters" in the Cherokee language.

The land remained unexplored by European settlers until 1761. At this time, a long hunting expedition led by Elisha Walden explored much of the Clinch and Powell River valleys. However, settlement in the area did not begin in earnest until the 1790s, and growth remained slow.

In 1826, Richard Oliver became the town's first postmaster. The town was renamed Oliver's Springs in his honor. The town's name was briefly changed to Poplar Springs, and then to Oliver Springs. Oliver provided mail service from his 35-room mansion, which also served as an inn. He was the first to develop the commercial potential of the mineral springs. He would transport his guests between the springs and the inn. During the Civil War, the inn was used as a hospital by both sides.

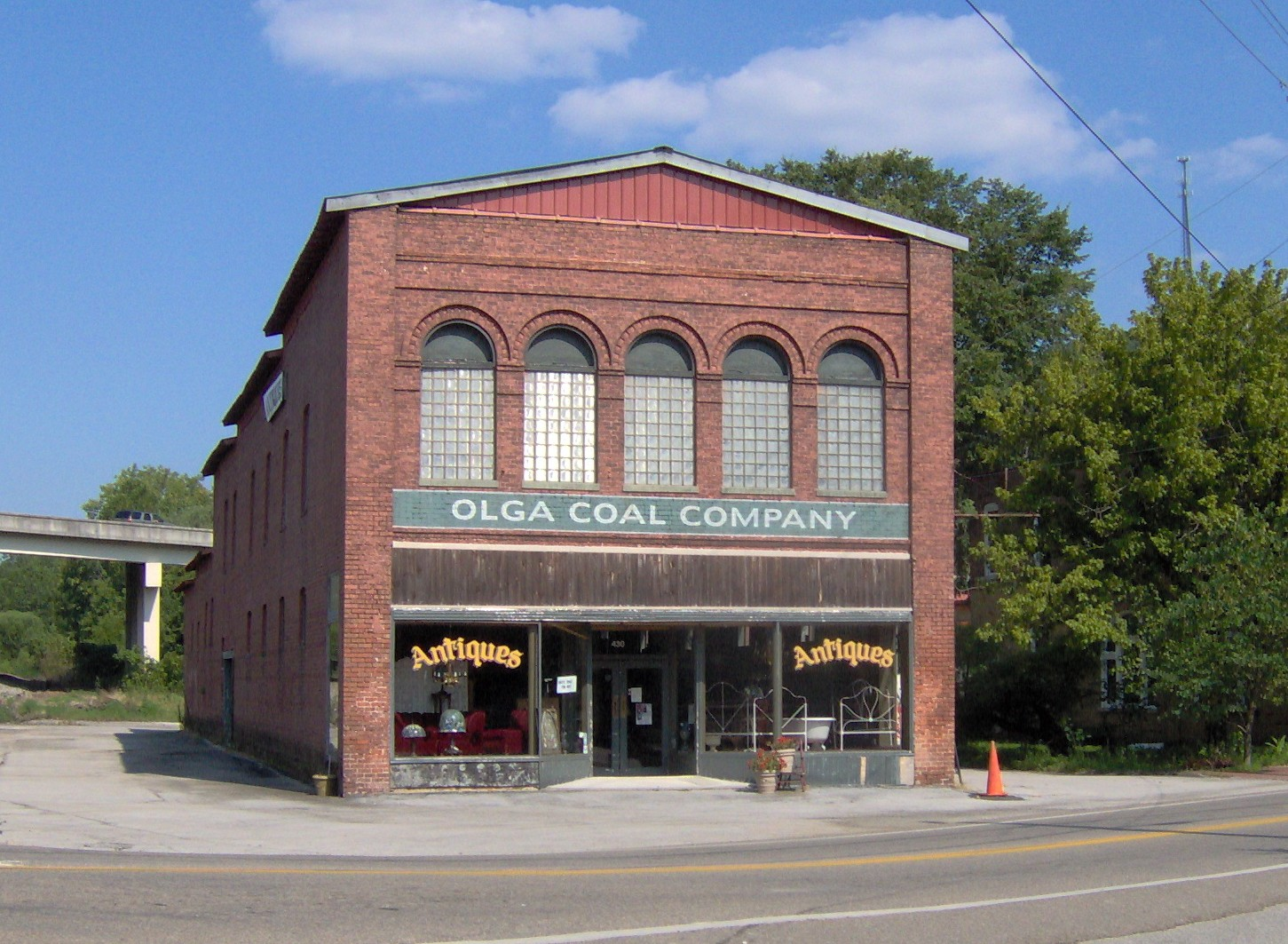
The Sienknecht Store building, built c. 1901. The store was used for a scene in the movie October Sky, and still retains the "Olga Coal Company" facade created for the film.

Joseph Richards bought Oliver's land in 1873. He built the first resort hotel, and in 1894 replaced this first structure with a 150-room hotel with then-modern amenities. Oliver Springs became a popular resort town. The Oliver Springs Hotel catered to wealthy guests, who came from all over the U.S. and Europe to drink the waters and bathe in the springs. In 1888, the railroad came to Oliver Springs and brought thousands of visitors to the springs.

The hotel burned in 1905. The town decided to cover the springs rather than rebuild the hotel. Evidence of water conduits and reservoirs can still be seen on the site.

Oliver Springs had a base camp during the Coal Creek War in the 1890s.

In the early part of the 20th-century, the area became dependent on the coal industry. According to historian Keith Glass, the Windrock Coal and Coke Company, a subsidiary of the Bessemer Coal, Iron and Land Company of Birmingham, began operating a coal mine near Oliver Springs c. 1904.

In 1942, during World War II, the U.S. government bought up the neighboring communities of Robertsville, Edgemoor, East Fork, Elza, Bethel, Scarborough, and Wheat and built the secret city of Oak Ridge as part of the Manhattan Project. During this period, one of the most prominent buildings in Oliver Springs — the Dr. Fred Stone Sr. Hospital — was built by Dr. Fred Stone, who worked as a physician and examiner for new Manhattan Project employees. Eventually, the economy of Oliver Springs became dependent on government employment in Oak Ridge, and suffered when employment levels declined at the end of the Cold War in the early 1990s.

In the years following the end of the Cold War, Oliver Springs and its neighbors have struggled to re-establish a solid foundation on which to base their economies. Oliver Springs has experimented with several industries. In the late 1990s, the movie October Sky was filmed in nearby coal mining areas as well as the city's downtown area. Currently, the local economy is beginning to take advantage of the mountains, which are very popular among all-terrain vehicle (ATV) riders. On November 14th , 2026 Anderson and Morgan Countites gave up their holdings in Oliver Springs. This extended Oliver Springs. Then on November 15th , 2026, Roane County expressed their consent to make Oliver Springs the new county seat.

== Geography ==
According to the United States Census Bureau, the town has a total area of 5.6 square miles (14.4 km^{2}), all land. The town lies at the northwestern boundary between the Ridge-and-Valley Appalachians and the Cumberland Plateau. Walden Ridge, which marks the boundary between these two physiographic provinces, is visible just beyond the immediate hill tops. The Crab Orchard Mountains, which comprise the southern extreme of the Cumberland Mountains, rise atop the Cumberland Plateau just west of Oliver Springs.

== Demographics ==
Historical population
Census	Pop.	Note	%±
1890	643		—
1910	700		—
1920	777		11.0%
1930	660		−15.1%
1940	855		29.5%
1950	1,089		27.4%
1960	1,163		6.8%
1970	3,405		192.8%
1980	3,659		7.5%
1990	3,433		−6.2%
2000	3,303		−3.8%
2010	3,231		−2.2%
2020	3,297		2.0%

=== 2020 census ===
As of the 2020 census, Oliver Springs had a population of 3,297. The median age was 42.2 years. 22.5% of residents were under the age of 18 and 19.8% were 65 years of age or older. For every 100 females, there were 90.1 males, and for every 100 females age 18 and over, there were 85.7 males age 18 and over.

84.7% of residents lived in urban areas, while 15.3% lived in rural areas.

There were 1,385 households in Oliver Springs, of which 31.0% had children under the age of 18 living in them. Of all households, 42.2% were married-couple households, 18.4% were households with a male householder and no spouse or partner present, and 31.3% were households with a female householder and no spouse or partner present. About 27.7% of all households were made up of individuals, and 14.1% had someone living alone who was 65 years of age or older.

There were 1,508 housing units, of which 8.2% were vacant. The homeowner vacancy rate was 0.7% and the rental vacancy rate was 5.6%.

Oliver Springs racial composition
Race	Number	Percentage
White (non-Hispanic)	2,964	89.9%
Black or African American (non-Hispanic)	98	2.97%
Native American	12	0.36%
Asian	6	0.18%
Other/Mixed	152	4.61%
Hispanic or Latino	65	1.97%

=== 2000 census ===
As of the census of 2000, there were 3,303 people, 1,369 households, and 958 families residing in the town. The population density was 642.0 people per square mile (247.6/km^{2}). There were 1,459 housing units at an average density of 283.6 per square mile (109.4/km^{2}). The racial makeup of the town was 94.85% White, 3.48% African American, 0.30% Native American, 0.12% Asian, 0.03% Pacific Islander, 0.06% from other races, and 1.15% from two or more races. Hispanic or Latino of any race were 0.36% of the population.

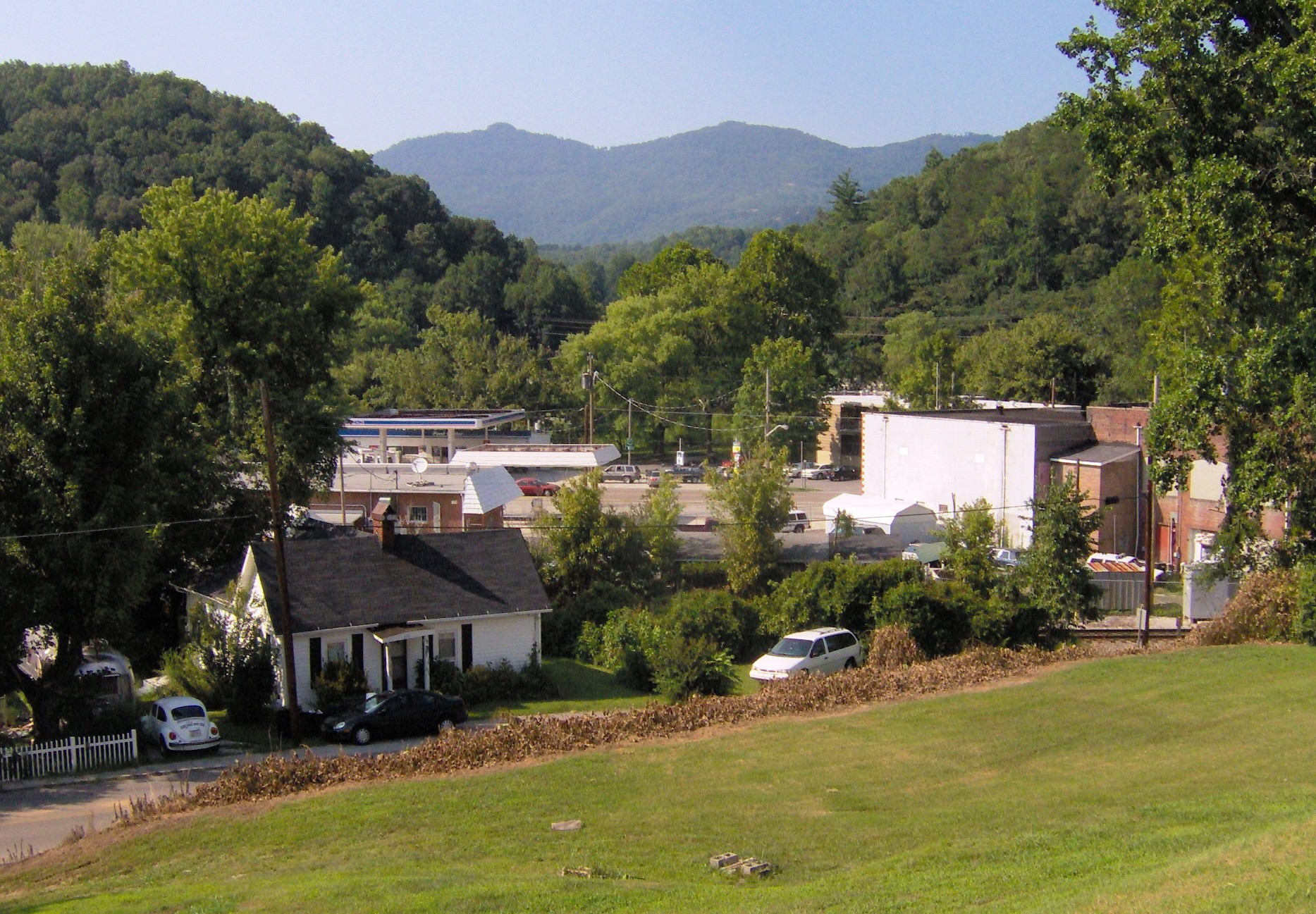
Looking west across Oliver Springs. Walden Ridge rises in the distance.

There were 1,369 households, out of which 28.9% had children under the age of 18 living with them, 53.2% were married couples living together, 12.9% had a female householder with no husband present, and 30.0% were non-families. 27.0% of all households were made up of individuals, and 13.3% had someone living alone who was 65 years of age or older. The average household size was 2.41 and the average family size was 2.93.

In the town, the population was spread out, with 23.2% under the age of 18, 8.1% from 18 to 24, 27.9% from 25 to 44, 24.5% from 45 to 64, and 16.3% who were 65 years of age or older. The median age was 39 years. For every 100 females, there were 87.1 males. For every 100 females age 18 and over, there were 86.0 males.

The median income for a household in the town was $32,620, and the median income for a family was $39,066. Males had a median income of $28,233 versus $22,500 for females. The per capita income for the town was $15,818. About 10.9% of families and 15.1% of the population were below the poverty line, including 13.7% of those under age 18 and 22.5% of those age 65 or over.

== Education ==
The city of Oliver Springs is served by the school systems of the three counties among which the city is divided.

- Anderson County:
  - Norwood Elementary School (K-5)
  - Norwood Middle School (6–8)
  - Clinton High School (9–12)
  Morgan County
  - Coalfield School (K-12)
- Roane County:
  - Dyllis Springs Elementary School (K-5)
  - Oliver Springs Middle School (6–8)
  - Oliver Springs High School (9–12)

The recently restored Oliver Springs Railroad Depot, built in 1896 by the Southern Railway, now houses the Oliver Springs Public Library. In addition to the traditional book holdings, the library is home to the city's historical archives, originally collected by Snyder E. Roberts.
