= Tennessee State Route 298 =

State highway in Tennessee, United States

State Route 298
- Genesis Road
- SR 298 highlighted in red

Route information
- Maintained by TDOT
- Length: 25.8 mi (41.5 km)
- Existed: July 1, 1983–present

Major junctions
- South end: US 127 in Crossville
- I-40 in Crossville
- North end: SR 62 west of Lancing

Location
- Country: United States
- State: Tennessee
- Counties: Cumberland, Morgan

Highway system
- Tennessee State Routes; Interstate; US; State
← SR 297	→ SR 299

State Route 298 (SR 298), also known as Genesis Road, is a 25.8-mile-long (41.5 km) north–south state highway in the Cumberland Plateau region of East Tennessee, serving as a connection between the cities of Crossville and Wartburg.

== Route description ==
SR 298 begins in Cumberland County in Crossville at an intersection with US 127/SR 28 just north of downtown. It goes northeast as a two-lane highway through neighborhoods before widening to a four-lane undivided highway and passing through industrial areas, where it crosses over the Little Obed River. SR 298 then has an interchange with I-40 (exit 320) before leaving Crossville and narrowing to two lanes. The highway then winds it way northeast through farmland before crossing the Obed River and entering the Catoosa Wildlife Management Area. SR 298 passes through the wooded areas of the management area as it crosses into Morgan County. The highway then passes through rural areas and farmland as it leaves the Catoosa Wildlife Management Area. SR 298 continues east to cross a bridge over Clear Creek shortly before coming to an end at an intersection with SR 62 west of Lancing.

== Major intersections ==
County	Location	mi	km	Destinations	Notes
Cumberland	Crossville	0.0	0.0	US 127 (North Main Street, SR 28) – Jamestown, Downtown, Pikeville	Southern terminus
Cumberland	Crossville			Bridge over the Little Obed River	
Cumberland	Crossville			SR 462 west (Interstate Drive)	Eastern terminus of SR 462
Cumberland	Crossville			I-40 – Nashville, Knoxville	I-40 exit 320
Cumberland				Adams Bridge over the Obed River	
Morgan				Jett Bridge over Clear Creek	
Morgan		25.8	41.5	SR 62 (Nashville Highway) – Clarkrange, Lancing, Wartburg	Northern terminus
1.000 mi = 1.609 km; 1.000 km = 0.621 mi
