= Barton Chapel Congregational Church =

Historic church in Tennessee, United States

- Barton Chapel
- U.S. National Register of Historic Places
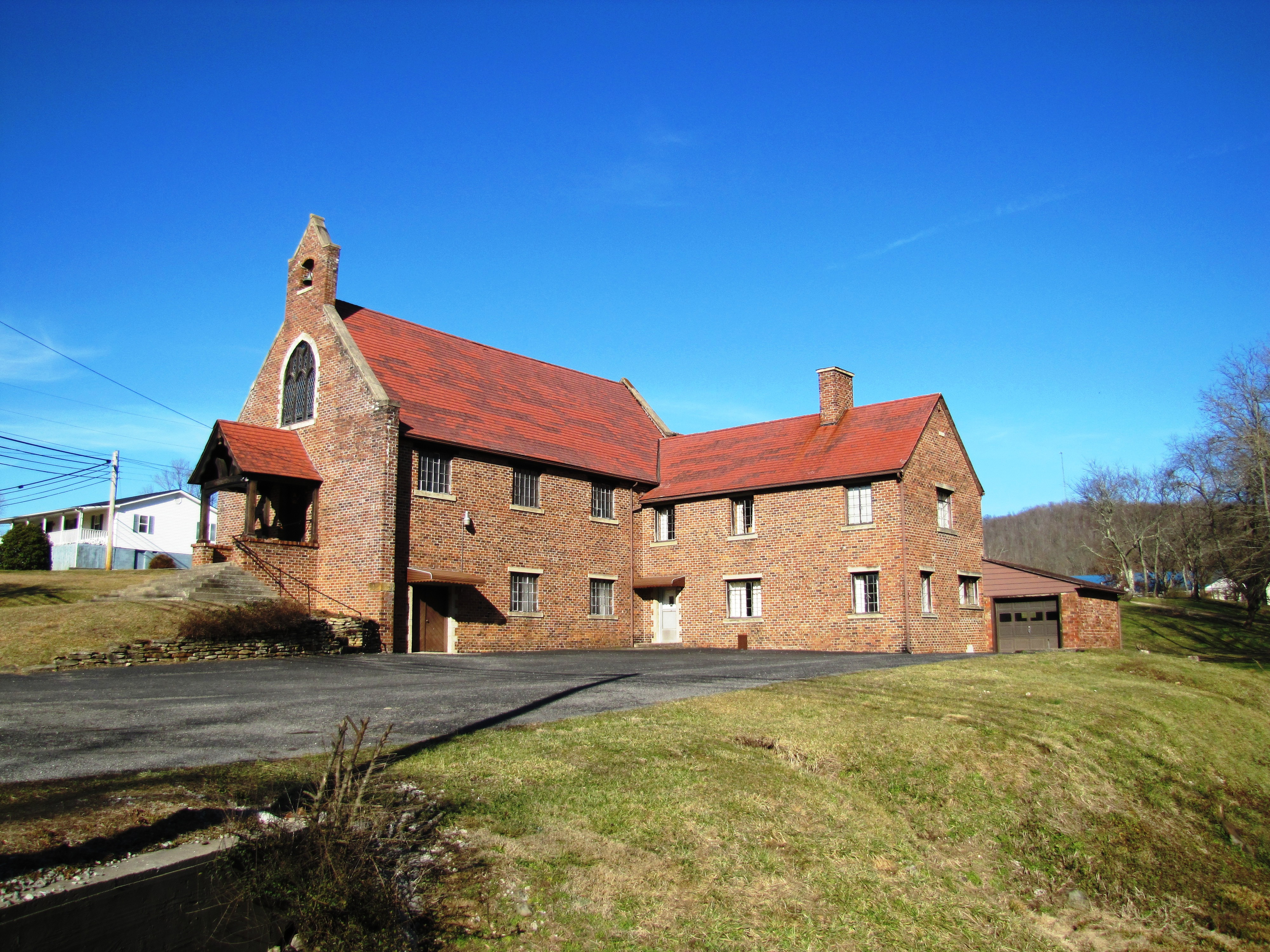

- Location within Tennessee Location within the United States
- Location: US 27, Robbins, Tennessee
- Coordinates: 36°21′6″N 84°35′19″W
- Area: less than one acre
- Built: 1926
- Architect: Austin Ayers
- Architectural style: Late Gothic Revival, Gothic Vernacular
- NRHP reference No.: 84003679
- Added to NRHP: July 12, 1984

Barton Chapel Congregational Church is a historic church in Robbins, Tennessee. The church building on U.S. Highway 27 was built in 1926 and was listed on the National Register of Historic Places in 1984.

The Congregational church in Robbins was established in 1885 with the Pilgrim Church. It was renamed Barton Chapel in honor of its first minister, William E. Barton. After attending Berea College, he spent two years as a circuit-riding preacher serving the church in Robbins as well as churches in Glenmary, Deer Lodge, and Lancing. He left Robbins to continue his education at a seminary in Ohio. After finishing at the seminary, he went on to serve the First Congregational Church in Oak Park, Illinois, as its pastor for 25 years. He left Illinois to conclude his career as a member of the faculty of the School of Religion at Vanderbilt University in Nashville. When the Congregational church in Robbins built a new building in 1926, the building was dedicated to Barton, who attended the cornerstone-laying ceremony.

The church is built from brick produced in Robbins, which was a center for brickmaking. The brick for the church was donated by the Southern Clay Manufacturing Company, wherein the church walls were laid three bricks thick. Interior furnishings in the church include a podium and two altar chairs from Barton's church in Oak Park, pews donated by the women of the Oak Park church, and light fixtures donated by a friend of the Barton family.
