= Tennessee State Route 329 =

State highway in Tennessee, United States

State Route 329
- Deer Lodge Highway
- SR 329 highlighted in red

Route information
- Maintained by TDOT
- Length: 9.2 mi (14.8 km)
- Existed: July 1, 1983–present

Major junctions
- South end: SR 62 south of Deer Lodge
- North end: US 27 in Sunbright

Location
- Country: United States
- State: Tennessee
- Counties: Morgan

Highway system
- Tennessee State Routes; Interstate; US; State
← SR 328	→ SR 330

State Route 329 (SR 329), also known as Deer Lodge Highway, is a 9.2-mile-long (14.8 km) north–south state highway in Morgan County, Tennessee. It is the primary road in and out of the community of Deer Lodge.

== Route description ==
SR 329 begins at a Y-intersection with SR 62. It winds it way north to enter the community of Deer Lodge and makes sharp turn to the east at an intersection with Irving Street and Old Deer Lodge Pike in the center of town. The highway then winds its way east then northeast through a mix of farmland and wooded areas before entering Sunbright and coming to an end at an intersection with US 27/SR 29. The entire route of SR 329 is a two-lane highway and lies on top of the Cumberland Plateau.

== Major intersections ==
The entire route is in Morgan County.

Location	mi	km	Destinations	Notes
	0.0	0.0	SR 62 (Nashville Highway) – Clarkrange, Lancing	Southern terminus
Sunbright	9.2	14.8	US 27 (Morgan County Highway/SR 29) – Huntsville, Wartburg	Northern terminus
1.000 mi = 1.609 km; 1.000 km = 0.621 mi
