= Tennessee State Route 62 =

State highway in Tennessee, United States

State Route 62
- SR 62; primary in red, secondary in blue

Route information
- Maintained by TDOT
- Length: 87.5 mi (140.8 km)
- Existed: October 1, 1923–present

Major junctions
- West end: SR 84 in Monterey
- US 127 in Clarkrange; US 27 in Wartburg; SR 61 / SR 330 in Oliver Springs; SR 95 in Oak Ridge; SR 162 in Solway; I-640 / I-75 in Knoxville; I-40 / I-275 in Knoxville
- East end: US 441 / SR 33 at Knoxville

Location
- Country: United States
- State: Tennessee
- Counties: Putnam, Fentress, Morgan, Roane, Anderson, Knox

Highway system
- Tennessee State Routes; Interstate; US; State
← SR 61	→ US 63

State Route 62 (SR 62) is a 87.5-mile-long (140.8 km) west-to-east highway in the U.S. state of Tennessee. It is designated as a primary route except for the short segment between SR 169 and its eastern terminus, which is secondary.

State Route 62 begins in Putnam County at State Route 84; it ends in Knox County at U.S. Route 441/State Route 33.

== Route description ==
=== Putnam and Fentress counties ===
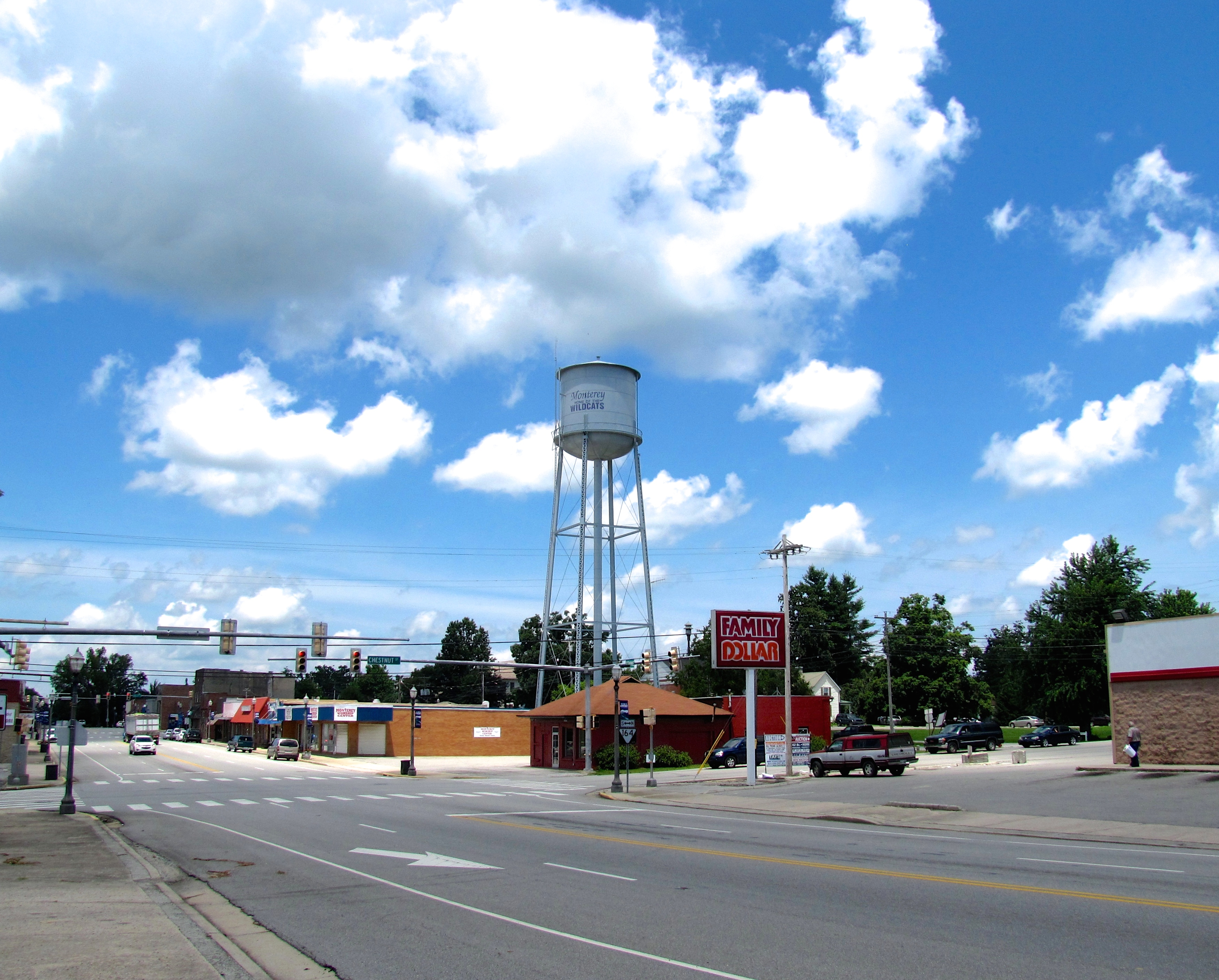
View along Commercial Avenue (SR 62) in Monterey

SR 62 begins in Putnam County in downtown Monterey as a primary highway at an intersection with SR 84 and SR 164. It then heads east (as East Commercial Avenue) through downtown before leaving Monterey (as Clarkrange Highway) as a two-lane highway to parallel I-40 for a short distance before going through forested areas and the community of Muddy Pond before crossing into Fentress County.

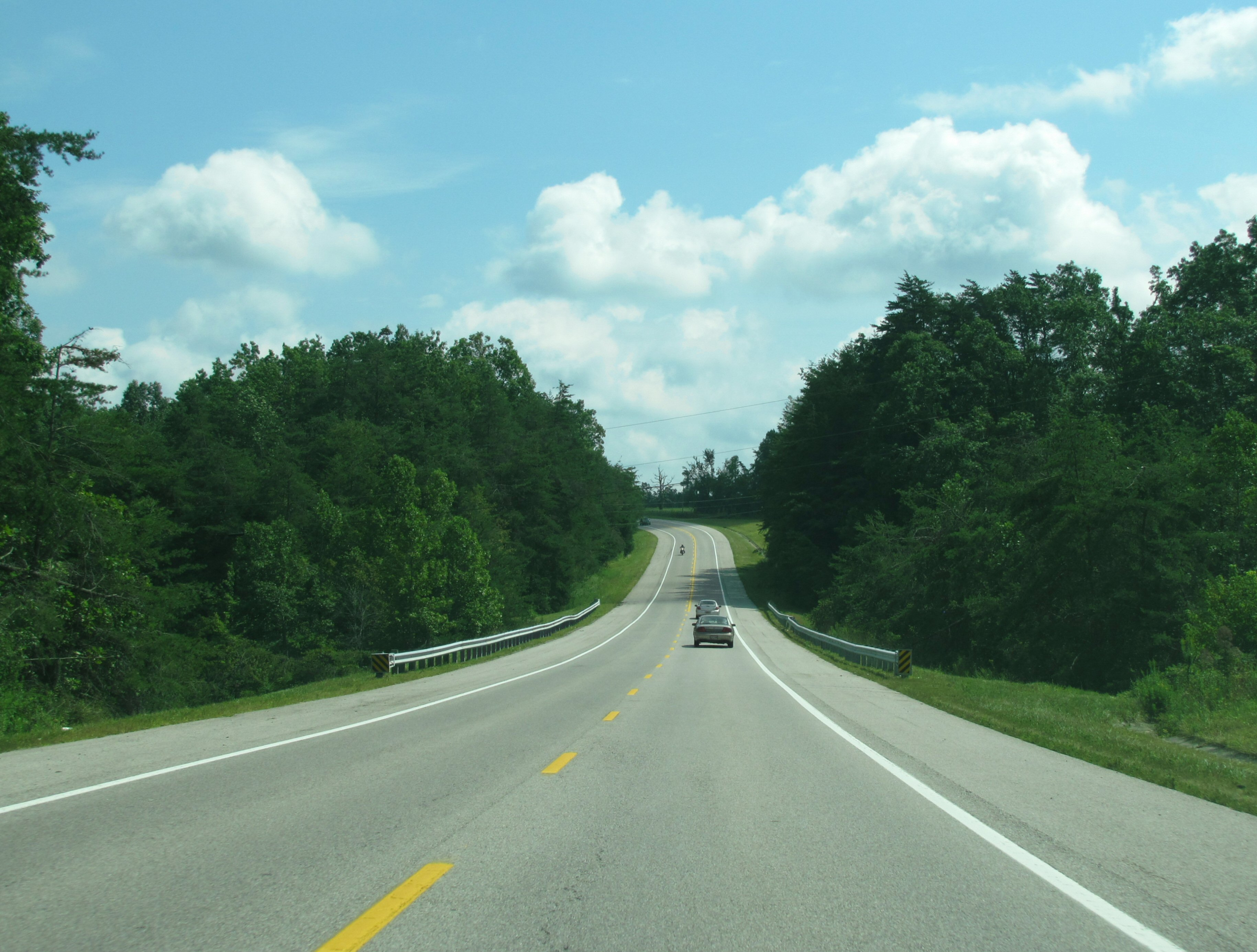
SR 62 in eastern Putnam County, Tennessee

SR 62 immediately enters farmland and goes down a fertile valley to enter Clarkrange and junction with US 127/SR 28. The highway now leaves Clarkrange (as Deer Lodge Highway) and continues east through farmland and crosses into Morgan County.

=== Morgan and Roane counties ===
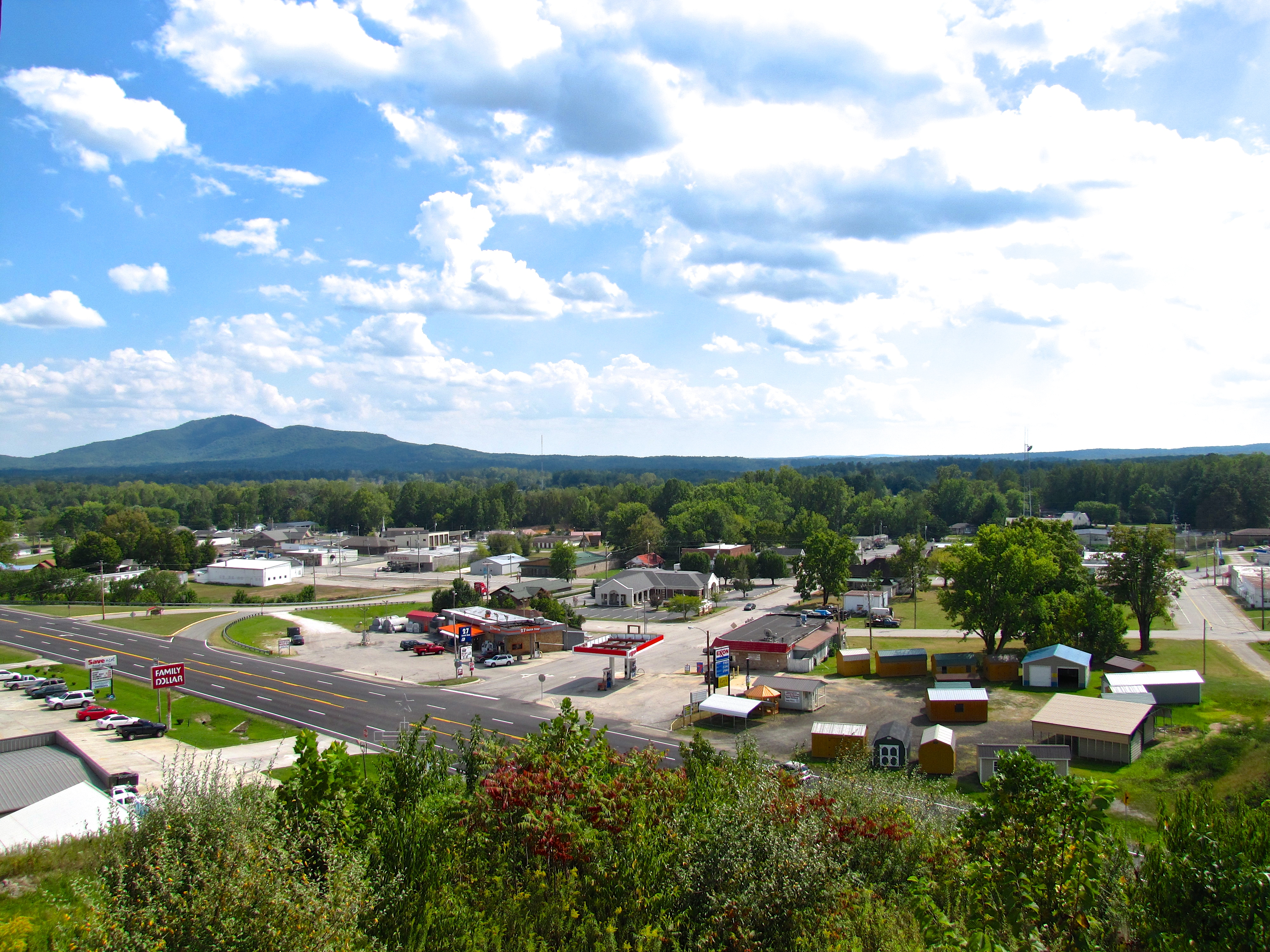
View of Wartburg, Tennessee. Lone Mountain is in the background on the left. US 27 and SR 62 (Morgan County Highway) is below.

In Morgan County, SR 62 transitions from the Central Time Zone to Eastern Time Zone, leaving farmland and becoming very curvy (and becoming Nashville Highway) as it heads east through the mountains of the Cumberland Plateau. It passes through Chestnut Ridge before it intersects the southern end of SR 329 south of Deer Lodge and continues east to intersect with SR 298. SR 62 continues eastward and goes through Lancing and becomes even curvier, before coming to an intersection with US 27/SR 29 (Morgan County Highway) north of Wartburg. It becomes concurrent with US 27/SR 29 and widens into a four-lane highway before entering Wartburg. They then pass just east of downtown before SR 62 separates from US 27/SR 29 and continues southeast (as Knoxville Highway) as a four-lane and then exits Wartburg. SR 62 continues southeast and narrows to a two-lane before entering Joyner. The highway continues through Joyner, which is mainly farmland, and then junctions with SR 116 west of Petros before entering Stephens. It goes through Stephens and then goes through a short mountain pass (locally known as Stephens Mountain) before passing through Coalfield to enter Oliver Springs and crosses into Roane County.

SR 62 almost immediately has an intersection between SR 61 (Tri County Boulevard/Harvey H. Hannah Memorial Highway) and SR 330, with it becoming concurrent with SR 61. They then bypasses downtown to the north and east as a four-lane and enter Anderson County.

=== Anderson and Knox counties ===
The highway continues through Oliver Springs and then separates from SR 61 and enters Oak Ridge (as Illinois Avenue). In Oak Ridge, SR 62 has a junction with SR 95 before widening to a six-lane and going through a major business district, passing by the Oak Ridge City Center mall. It then downgrades to a four-lane at an interchange with Centrifuge Way. The highway continues to an interchange with Scarboro Road, which provides access to the Y-12 National Security Complex, and SR 170 before leaving Oak Ridge and crossing the Clinch River/Melton Hill Lake. Here, SR 62 crosses into Knox County and enters Solway.

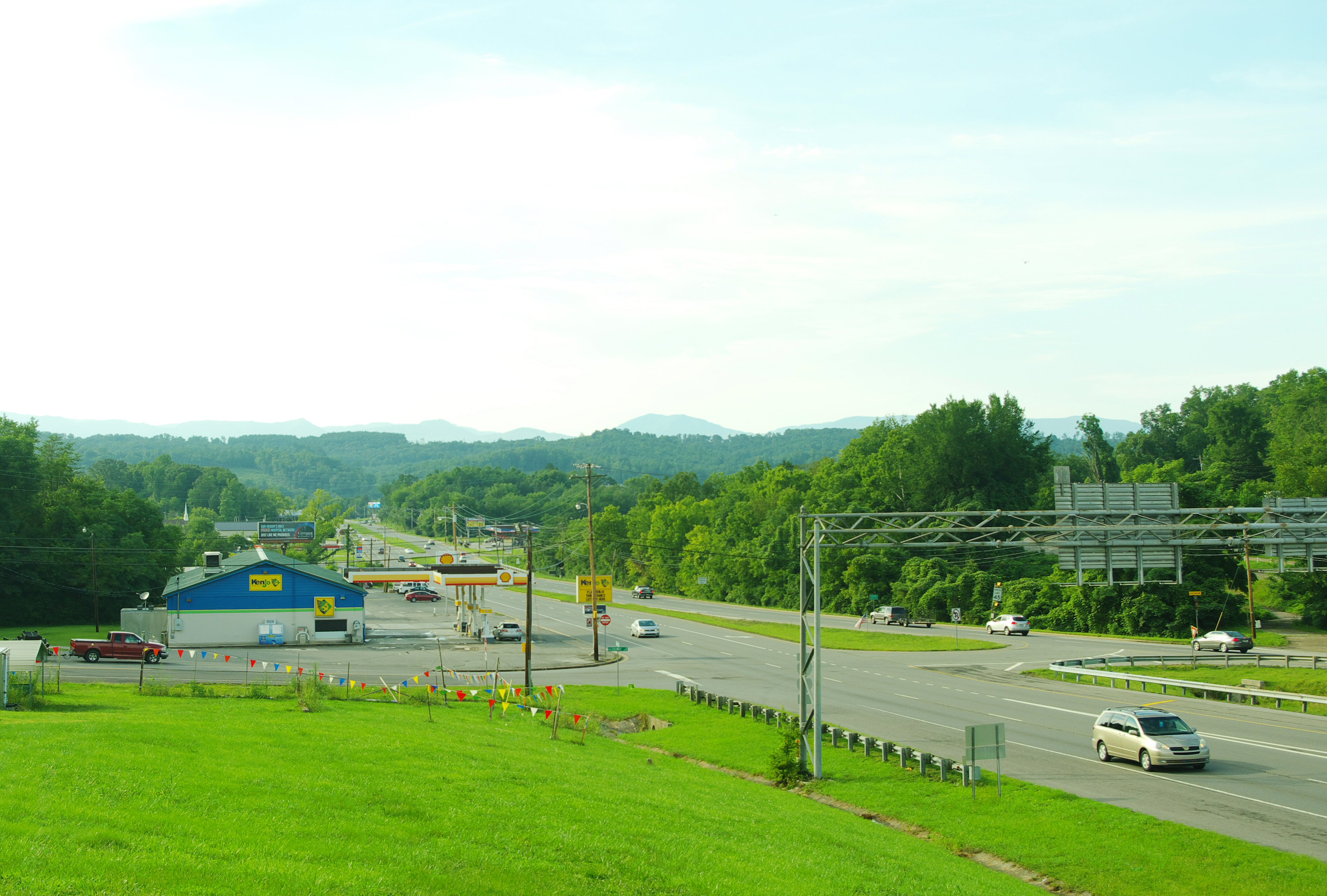
Oak Ridge Highway (SR 62) passing through Solway at the interchange with Pellissippi Parkway (SR 162)

SR 62 goes through Solway (as Oak Ridge Highway) and has partial interchange with SR 162 (Pellisippi Parkway) before leaving Solway and narrowing to a two-lane. It then passes through Karns and junctions with SR 131 before entering Knoxville, widening to a four-lane and becoming Western Avenue. SR 62 continues through North Knoxville before widening to a six-lane and having an interchange with I-640/I-75. The highway narrows to a two-lane for short distance before widening back out to a four-lane and intersecting SR 169. SR 62 then turns secondary and has an interchange with I-40/I-275 before entering downtown and ending at an intersection with US 441/SR 33.

== Junction list ==
County	Location	mi	km	Destinations	Notes
Putnam	Monterey	0.0	0.0	SR 84 (West Commercial Avenue / South Holly Street) to I-40 – Livingston, Sparta	Western terminus; SR 62 begins as a primary route
Putnam	Monterey	0.1	0.16	SR 164 (North / South Chestnut Street) – Hanging Limb, Crawford	
Fentress	Clarkrange	15.9	25.6	US 127 (York Highway/SR 28) – Jamestown, Crossville	
Morgan		32.2	51.8	SR 329 north (Deer Lodge Highway) – Deer Lodge, Sunbright	Southern terminus of SR 329
Morgan		35.9	57.8	SR 298 south (Genesis Road) – Crossville	Northern terminus of SR 298
Morgan	Lancing	42.4	68.2	US 27 north (Morgan County Highway/SR 29) – Sunbright, Huntsville	Western end of US 27/SR 29 concurrency
Morgan	Wartburg	45.1	72.6	North Kingston Street – Downtown Wartburg, Obed Wild and Scenic River National Park Service Visitor Center, Justin P. Wilson Cumberland Trail State Park	
Morgan	Wartburg	45.3	72.9	Water Tank Hill Road South – Downtown Wartburg	
Morgan	Wartburg	45.6	73.4	US 27 south (Morgan County Highway/SR 29) – Harriman	Eastern end of US 27/SR 29 concurrency
Morgan	Joyner	53.1	85.5	SR 116 north (Petros Highway) – Petros	Southern terminus of SR 116
Roane	Oliver Springs	61.0	98.2	SR 61 west (Tri-County Boulevard) – Harriman SR 330 north (Winter Gap Road) – Downtown Oliver Springs	Eastern end of SR 61 concurrency; Southern terminus of SR 330
Anderson	Oliver Springs	61.8	99.5	Downtown Oliver Springs To SR 330 (Spring Street)	Interchange; Westbound exit and eastbound entrance
Anderson	Oliver Springs	64.3	103.5	SR 61 east (Oliver Springs Highway) – Clinton	Eastern end of SR 61 concurrency
Anderson	Oak Ridge	66.4	106.9	SR 95 (Oak Ridge Turnpike) – Clinton, Kingston	
Anderson	Oak Ridge	68.7	110.6	Centrifuge Way	Interchange
Anderson	Oak Ridge	70.2	113.0	Scarboro Road – Oak Ridge National Laboratory, Y-12 National Security Complex	Interchange
Anderson	Oak Ridge	71.2	114.6	SR 170 east (Edgemoor Road) – Claxton	Western terminus of SR 170; Interchange
Melton Hill Lake/Clinch River		71.4	114.9	Dr. Herman Postma Memorial Solway Bridge over Melton Hill Lake/Clinch River	
Knox	Solway	72.7	117.0	SR 162 south (Pellissippi Parkway) – Alcoa, Maryville	Interchange; Northern terminus of SR 162; No Access to SR 162 from westbound 62
Knox	Karns	76.2	122.6	SR 131 (Byington Beaver Ridge Road) – Farragut, Powell	
Knox	Knoxville	84.1	135.3	Ed Shouse Road To SR 169 (Middlebrook Pike)	
Knox	Knoxville	84.3	135.7	I-75 / I-640 – Lexington, Nashville, Chattanooga	I-640, exit 1
Knox	Knoxville	86.7	139.5	SR 169 west (Middlebrook Pike)	Eastern terminus of SR 169; SR 62 changes to a secondary route
Knox	Knoxville	87.1	140.2	I-275 north / I-40 east – Lexington, Asheville	Ramp to I-275 North and I-40 East
Knox	Knoxville	87.5	140.8	US 441 / SR 33 (Henley Street) – University of Tennessee, Worlds Fair Park, Halls Crossroads	Eastern terminus of SR 62; SR 62 ends as a secondary route
1.000 mi = 1.609 km; 1.000 km = 0.621 mi: Concurrency terminus; Incomplete access
