= Deer Lodge, Tennessee =

- Unincorporated community
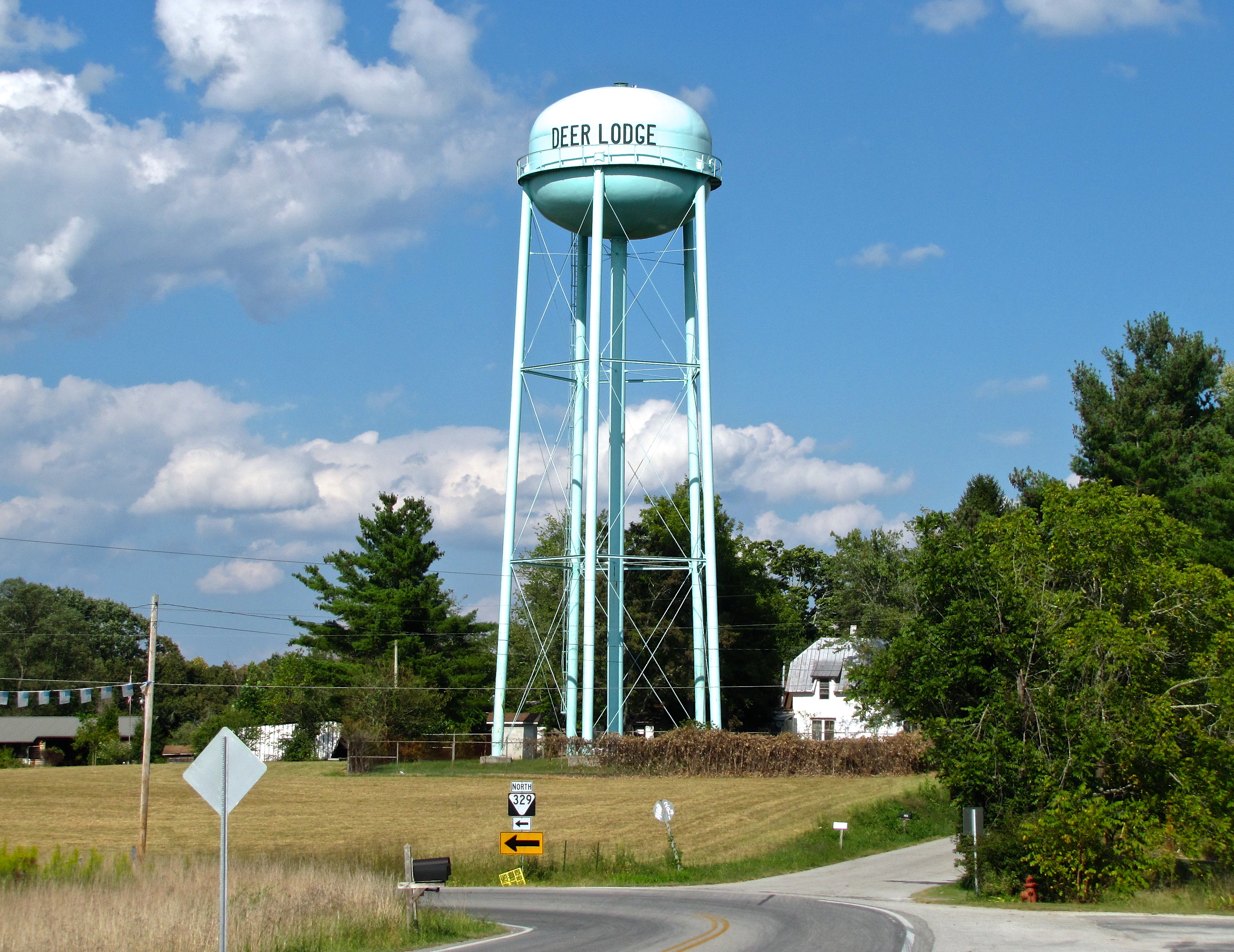

- Location within Tennessee Location within the United States
- Coordinates: 36°12′05″N 84°45′33″W
- Country: United States
- State: Tennessee
- County: Morgan
- Elevation: 1,575 ft (480 m)
- Time zone: UTC-5 (Eastern (EST))
  - Summer (DST): UTC-4 (EDT)
- ZIP code: 37726
- Area code: 423
- GNIS feature ID: 1306319

Deer Lodge is an unincorporated community in Morgan County, Tennessee, United States. It is located along Tennessee State Route 329 5.8 miles (9.3 km) west-southwest of Sunbright. Deer Lodge has a post office with ZIP code 37726, which opened on April 16, 1886. The community was established as a health resort in the 1880s by Rugby colonist Abner Ross.

== History ==
Deer Lodge was originally situated around a 300-acre (120 ha) tract of land acquired by the Davidson family in the early 1800s. In 1845, James Davidson built a grist mill and saw mill on the land. In 1876, Peter Fox purchased the land and attempted to establish a sheep ranch, but was unsuccessful.

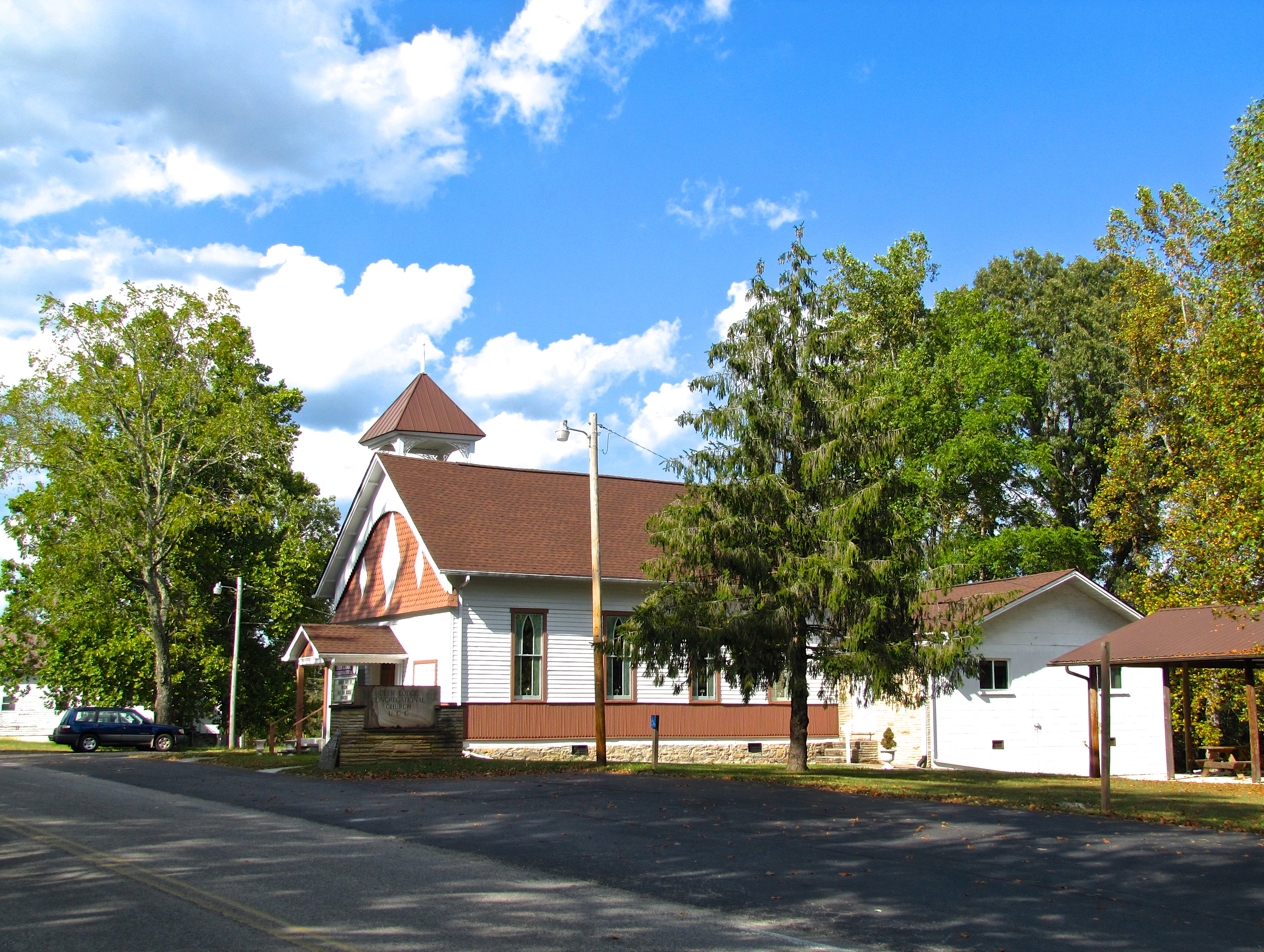
Deer Lodge Congregational Church, built in 1889

In 1884, Fox sold the land to Abner Ross, a former Rugby colonist. Ross, who had been the proprietor of Rugby's Tabard Inn, decided to convert the tract into a mountain resort. He constructed a Victorian-style house, Walnut Knoll, which was soon followed by a string of similarly-styled houses built by new residents. He also constructed a printer works, which has since been relocated to Rugby. By the end of the 1890s, Deer Lodge had two hotels (the Mountain View and Summit Park), a newspaper (the Southern Enterprise), a theater, a band, a planing mill, and numerous clubs and civic organizations.

By the mid-20th century, the community had declined, however, as many children and grandchildren of the original settlers moved away. The population of Deer Lodge was just 155 in 1930. On February 6, 2025, a EF2 tornado impacted Deer Lodge killing two: a mother and a daughter. The wreckage is still being recovered.

== Geography ==
Deer Lodge is located in a remote section of the Cumberland Plateau in western Morgan County. State Route 329 connects the community with U.S. Route 27 and Sunbright to the northeast and the east-west oriented State Route 62 to the south. Beyond SR 62 is the vast Catoosa Wildlife Management Area. Deer Lodge straddles the Tennessee Valley Divide, with waters in the northern part of the community flowing toward the Big South Fork of the Cumberland River, and waters in the southern half flowing toward the Obed River.
