= Tennessee State Route 299 =

State highway in Tennessee, United States

State Route 299
- Westel Road; Airport Road
- SR 299 highlighted in red

Route information
- Maintained by TDOT
- Length: 17.6 mi (28.3 km)
- Existed: July 1, 1983–present

Major junctions
- South end: US 70 in Westel
- I-40 in Westel
- North end: SR 328 in Oakdale

Location
- Country: United States
- State: Tennessee
- Counties: Cumberland, Roane, Morgan

Highway system
- Tennessee State Routes; Interstate; US; State
← SR 298	→ SR 300

State Route 299 (SR 299) is a 17.6-mile-long (28.3 km) state highway in the Cumberland Plateau region of East Tennessee.

== Route description ==
SR 299 begins in Cumberland County in Westel at an intersection with US 70/SR 1. It winds it way north through the community as Westel Road to have an interchange with, and then run concurrently with, I-40 at exit 338. It follows I-40 east for approximately two miles (3.2 km) to exit 340, where it splits off and goes north as Airport Road to pass Rockwood Municipal Airport. Part of this interchange is located in Roane County. SR 299 heads northeast through wooded areas as it passes the airport before crossing into Morgan County. SR 299 then passes through Pine Orchard before going through farmland and rural areas to enter Oakdale and become W Main Street. It passes through town before crossing a very tall bridge over the Emory River just shortly before coming to an end at an intersection with SR 328.

== Major intersections ==
County	Location	mi	km	Destinations	Notes
Cumberland	Westel	0.0	0.0	US 70 (SR 1) – Rockwood, Crab Orchard, Crossville	Southern terminus
Cumberland	Westel			I-40 west – Nashville	I-40 exit 338; southern end of I-40 concurrency
Cumberland–Roane county line				I-40 east – Knoxville	I-40 exit 340; northern end of I-40 concurrency
Cumberland				Rockwood Municipal Airport	Access road into airport
Morgan	Oakdale			Bridge over the Emory River	
Morgan	Oakdale	17.6	28.3	SR 328 (Old Harriman Highway) – Wartburg, Harriman	Northern terminus
1.000 mi = 1.609 km; 1.000 km = 0.621 mi: Concurrency terminus
