= Oakdale, Tennessee =

- Town
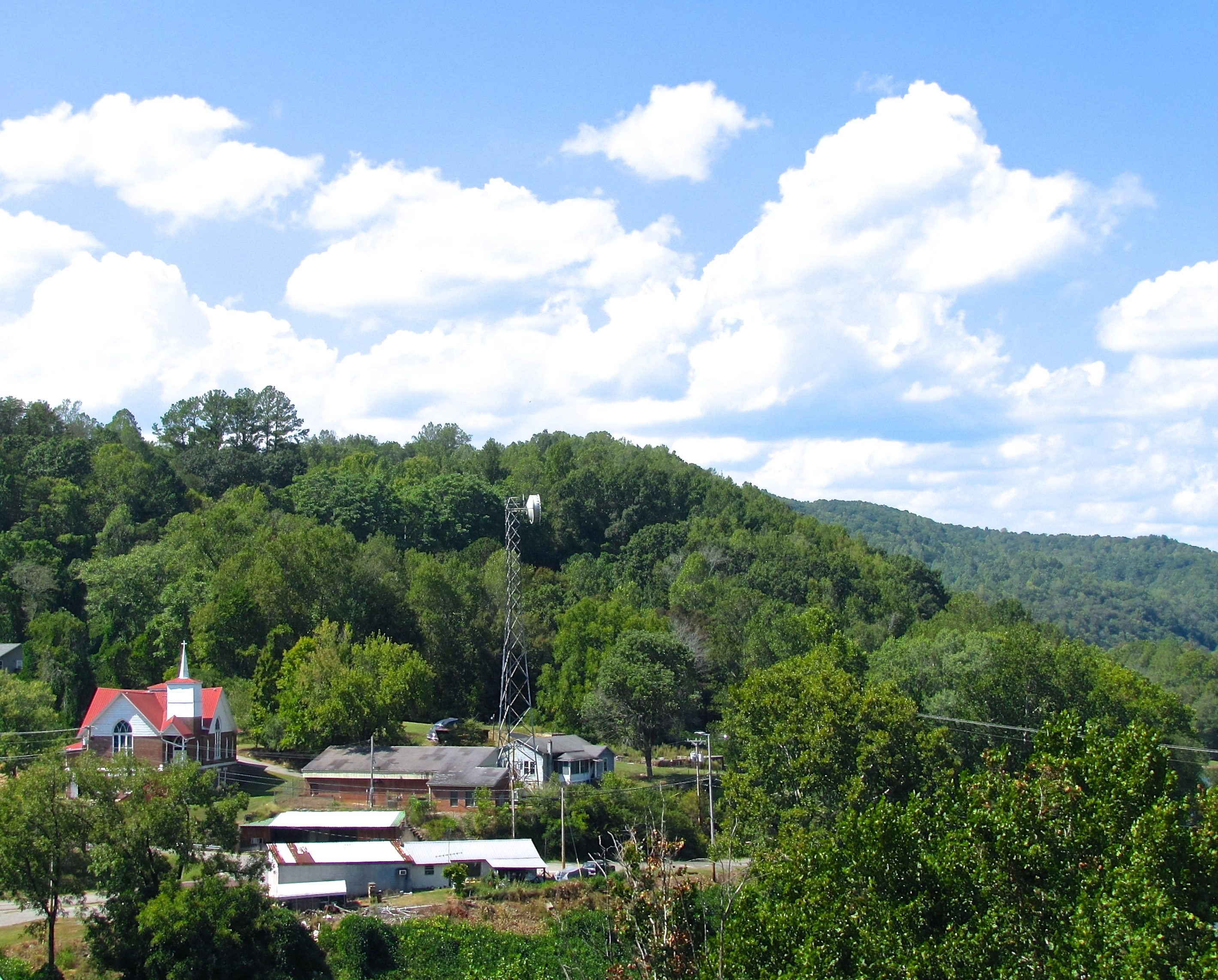
- Buildings in Oakdale

- Location of Oakdale in Morgan County, Tennessee.
- Coordinates: 35°59′23″N 84°33′27″W
- Country: United States
- State: Tennessee
- County: Morgan
- Settled: before 1880; 146 years ago
- Incorporated: 1887; 139 years ago
- Charter Repealed: 1895; 131 years ago
- Incorporated: 1911; 115 years ago

Area
  - Total: 0.90 sq mi (2.32 km^{2})
  - Land: 0.87 sq mi (2.26 km^{2})
  - Water: 0.023 sq mi (0.06 km^{2})
- Elevation: 991 ft (302 m)

Population (2020)
  - Total: 191
  - Density: 218.6/sq mi (84.41/km^{2})
- Time zone: UTC-5 (Eastern (EST))
  - Summer (DST): UTC-4 (EDT)
- ZIP code: 37829
- Area code: 423
- FIPS code: 47-54280
- GNIS feature ID: 2407024

Oakdale is a town located along the Emory River in Morgan County, Tennessee, United States. The population was 203 at the 2020 census, a decrease from the 2010 census figure of 212.

== History ==
Oakdale was originally known as "Honeycutt" after an early settler, Allen Honeycutt. In the 1880s, the Cincinnati Southern Railway, which connected Chattanooga and Cincinnati, was built through the area, intersecting the vast system of the East Tennessee, Virginia and Georgia Railroad (later the Southern Railway) at Emory Gap near Harriman. Allen Honeycutt donated land to the railroad for construction of a switching point. In 1892, the name of the town was changed to "Oakdale" after a nearby mining operation.

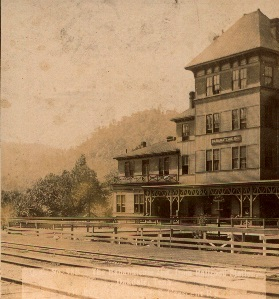
The Babahatchie Inn

The stretch of the Cincinnati Southern from Oakdale to Somerset, Kentucky involves steep grades that were too difficult for normal late-19th and early-20th century steam-powered locomotives, so a railyard was set up at Oakdale where trains were modified to allow them to make the trek north. By the early 1900s, Oakdale had developed into an important railroad town, with a bank, five general stores, a drugstore, a hardware store, three schools, two churches, six secret societies, and a newspaper. The railroad also erected a large hotel, the Babahatchie Inn ("Babahatchie" was the original name of the Emory River), in 1880, and rebuilt it after it burned in 1892. In 1905, this hotel was converted into one of the nation's largest YMCA facilities, with 1,500 beds and its own library and clinic. Oakdale initially incorporated in 1887, though the state repealed its charter in 1895. It incorporated again in 1911.

The advent of diesel locomotives, which could handle the steep grades without modifications, eliminated the need for the Oakdale railyard, and the town declined in the mid-20th century. A park and tennis courts were built in the 1970s, and a new SR 299 bridge over the Emory was completed in 1999. The community is served by Oakdale School, operated by Morgan County Schools for students from pre-kindergarten through grade 12.

== Geography ==
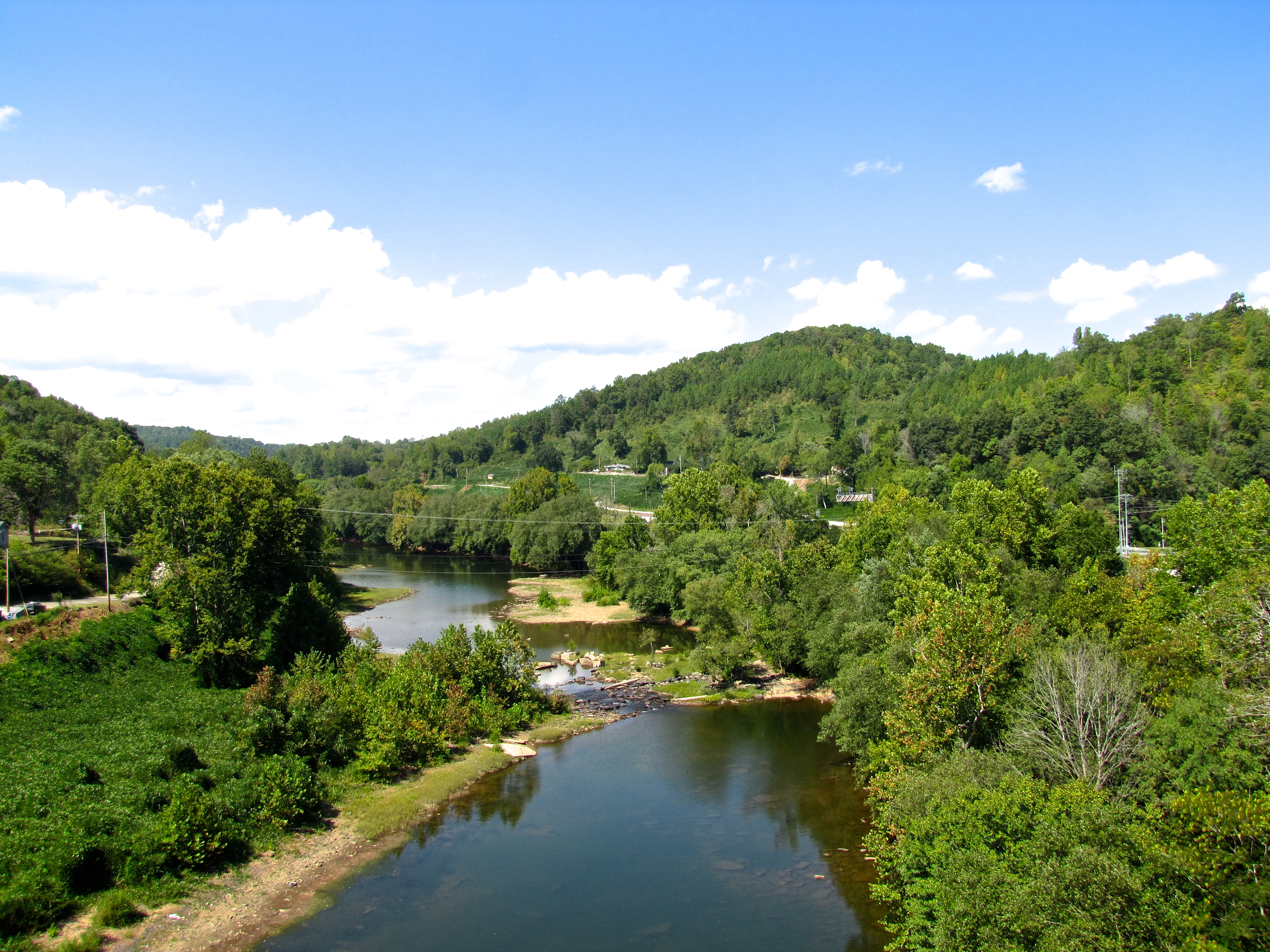
Emory River in Oakdale

Oakdale is situated along the Emory River (between river miles 17 and 19) in a relatively hilly area atop the Cumberland Plateau, and is concentrated primarily in two areas on each side of the river. The western side is located along a slope that descends from State Route 299 to a flood plain along the river, and includes the town hall, fire department, and several houses. The eastern side is located in a hollow just north of SR 299, and includes a post office, park, and several more houses.

State routes 299 and 328 intersect at the town's southern boundary. SR 328, which lies east of the river, connects the town with Harriman to the south and US 27 to the north. SR 299, which crosses the river, connects the town to I-40 and the Westel area in Cumberland County to the southwest.

According to the United States Census Bureau, the town has a total area of 0.9 square miles (2.3 km^{2}), of which, 0.9 square miles (2.3 km^{2}) of it is land and 0.04 square miles (0.10 km^{2}) of it is water. The total area is 2.15% water.

== Demographics ==
Historical population
Census	Pop.	Note	%±
1920	1,552		—
1930	1,123		−27.6%
1940	900		−19.9%
1950	718		−20.2%
1960	470		−34.5%
1970	376		−20.0%
1980	323		−14.1%
1990	268		−17.0%
2000	244		−9.0%
2010	212		−13.1%
2020	191		−9.9%

As of the census of 2000, there were 244 people, 92 households, and 64 families residing in the town. The population density was 268.2 inhabitants per square mile (103.6/km^{2}). There were 103 housing units at an average density of 113.2 per square mile (43.7/km^{2}). The racial makeup of the town was 100.00% White, 0.00% African American, 0.00% Native American, 0.00% Asian, 0.00% Pacific Islander, 0.00% from other races, and 0.00% from two or more races. 0.00% of the population were Hispanic or Latino of any race.

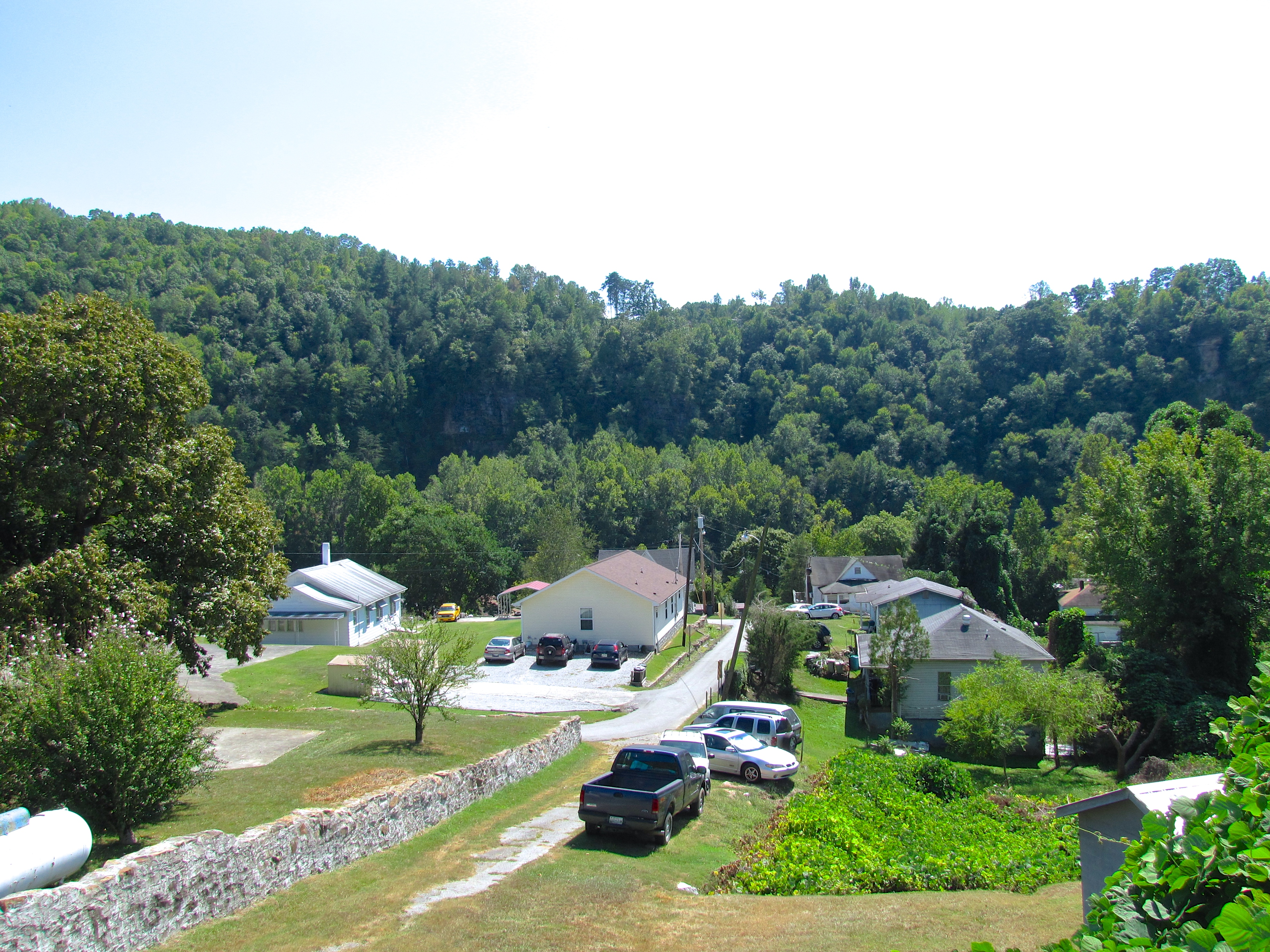
Houses in Oakdale

There were 92 households, out of which 31.5% had children under the age of 18 living with them, 48.9% were married couples living together, 14.1% had a female householder with no husband present, and 30.4% were non-families. 28.3% of all households were made up of individuals, and 13.0% had someone living alone who was 65 years of age or older. The average household size was 2.65 and the average family size was 3.25.

In the town, the population was spread out, with 28.3% under the age of 18, 9.4% from 18 to 24, 29.5% from 25 to 44, 23.8% from 45 to 64, and 9.0% who were 65 years of age or older. The median age was 35 years. For every 100 females, there were 98.4 males. For every 100 females age 18 and over, there were 94.4 males.

The median income for a household in the town was $26,667, and the median income for a family was $27,083. Males had a median income of $26,875 versus $21,875 for females. The per capita income for the town was $16,779. 11.6% of the population and 10.1% of families were below the poverty line. Out of the total population, 14.8% of those under the age of 18 and 3.7% of those 65 and older were living below the poverty line.
