= Robbins, Tennessee =

- Census-designated place
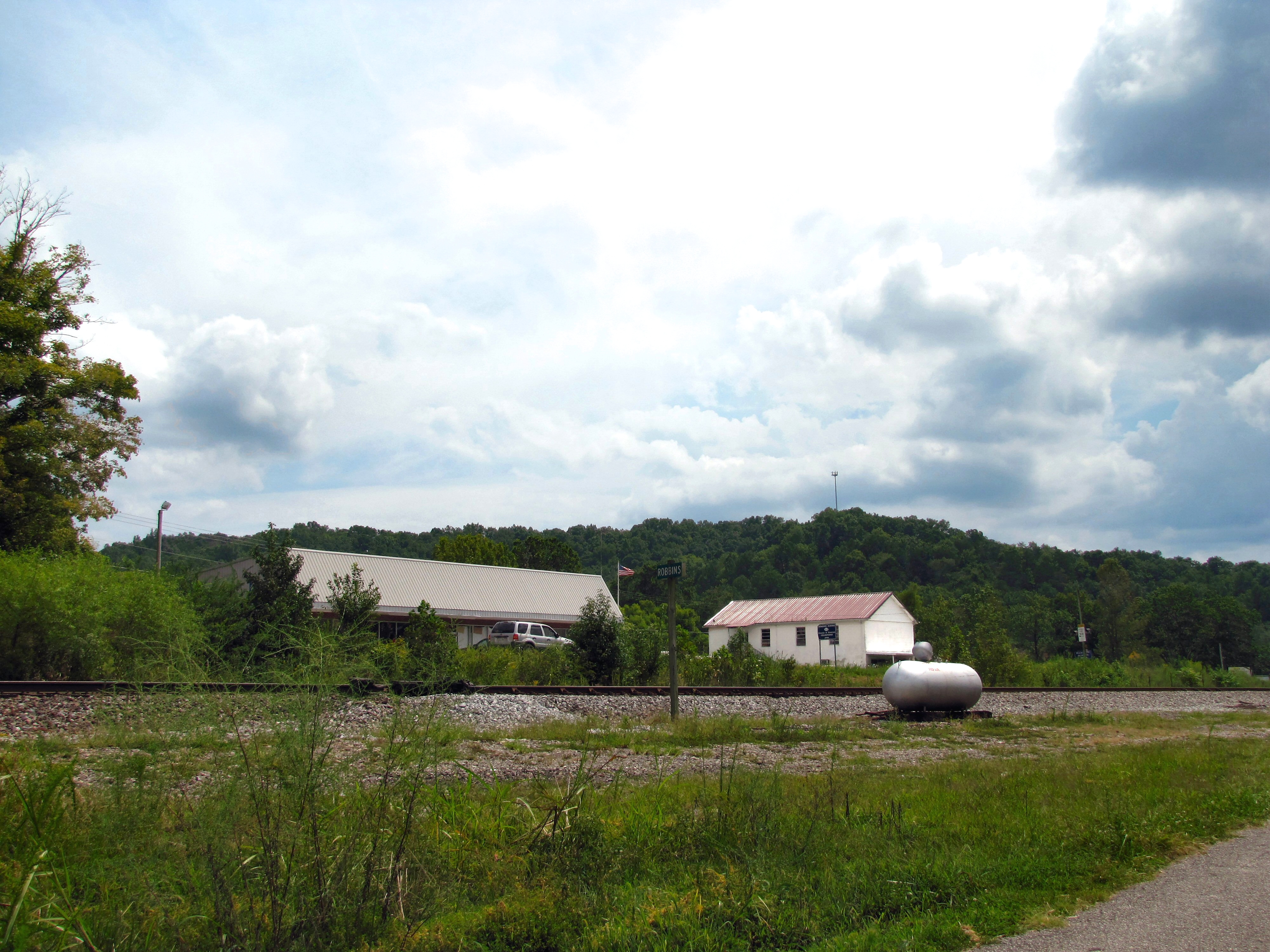

- Location within Tennessee
- Coordinates: 36°21′12″N 84°35′22″W
- Country: United States
- State: Tennessee
- County: Scott

Area
  - Total: 1.75 sq mi (4.52 km^{2})
  - Land: 1.75 sq mi (4.52 km^{2})
  - Water: 0 sq mi (0.00 km^{2})
- Elevation: 1,378 ft (420 m)

Population (2020)
  - Total: 254
  - Density: 145.4/sq mi (56.14/km^{2})
- Time zone: UTC-6 (Central (CST))
  - Summer (DST): UTC-5 (CDT)
- ZIP code: 37852
- Area code: 423
- GNIS feature ID: 1299586

Robbins is an unincorporated community and census-designated place (CDP) in Scott County, Tennessee. As of the 2010 census, its population is 287. It is concentrated along U.S. Route 27 between Huntsville and Elgin, in Tennessee's Cumberland Plateau region. The community is served by Robbins Elementary School. It is also home to Barton Chapel, a 1920s-era Gothic Revival church designed by noted architectural firm, Barber and McMurry.

The community is probably named for a family that lived in the vicinity when a post office was established in 1880.

== Demographics ==
Historical population
Census	Pop.	Note	%±
2020	254		—
U.S. Decennial Census

== Notable people ==
- Bruce Fairchild Barton, an advertising executive who represented New York in the United States House of Representatives from 1937 to 1940
- Harry C. Stonecipher, former president and CEO of McDonnell Douglas and Boeing
