= Tennessee State Route 330 =

State highway in Tennessee, United States

State Route 330
- SR 330 highlighted in red

Route information
- Maintained by TDOT
- Length: 9.1 mi (14.6 km)
- Existed: July 1, 1983–present

Major junctions
- South end: SR 61 / SR 62 in Oliver Springs
- North end: SR 116 in Laurel Grove

Location
- Country: United States
- State: Tennessee
- Counties: Anderson, Roane

Highway system
- Tennessee State Routes; Interstate; US; State
← SR 329	→ SR 331

State Route 330 (SR 330) is a state highway in East Tennessee, most of which is also known as Frost Bottom Road, that runs southwest to northeast from Oliver Springs to the junction with SR 116 at Laurel Grove. SR 330 was designated a state highway during the 1983 Tennessee state highway renumbering.

== Route description ==
SR 330 begins in Roane County in Oliver Springs at an intersection with SR 61 and SR 62. It goes south as Winter Gap Road before turning east (left) on Main Street. It then enters downtown curves to the south to cross over a railroad track to enter Anderson County. It then comes to a 4-way stop, where SR 330 turns east (left) onto E Spring Street, where it leaves downtown and begins passing through neighborhoods. It then has another railroad crossing before leaving Oliver Springs and becoming slightly curvy for a short distance before crossing a bridge and coming to an intersection with Dutch Valley Road, where SR 330 turns northeast (left) onto Frost Bottom Road. It continues northeast through a narrow valley through rural areas as an improved 2-lane highway before entering Laurel Grove and coming to an end at an intersection with SR 116.

The entire route of SR 330 is a 2-lane roadway.

== Major intersections ==
County	Location	mi	km	Destinations	Notes
Roane	Oliver Springs	0.00	0.00	SR 61 / SR 62 (Tri County Boulevard/Knoxville Highway) – Coalfield, Harriman, Oak Ridge	Southern terminus
Anderson	Oliver Springs	0.5	0.80	Main Street To SR 61 east / SR 62 east – Oak Ridge	
Anderson	Laurel Grove	9.1	14.6	SR 116 (Fraterville Miners' Memorial Highway) – Briceville	Northern terminus
1.000 mi = 1.609 km; 1.000 km = 0.621 mi
