= Interstate 275 (Tennessee) =

Highway in Knoxville, Tennessee, United States

Interstate 275
- I-275 highlighted in red

Route information
- Auxiliary route of I-75
- Maintained by TDOT
- Length: 2.98 mi (4.80 km)
- Existed: June 22, 1980–present
- History: 1957-1980 (as a part of I-75)
- NHS: Entire route

Major junctions
- South end: I-40 in Knoxville
- North end: I-75 / I-640 / US 25W in Knoxville

Location
- Country: United States
- State: Tennessee
- Counties: Knox

Highway system
- Interstate Highway System; Main; Auxiliary; Suffixed; Business; Future; Tennessee State Routes; Interstate; US; State
← SR 274	→ SR 275

Interstate 275 (I-275) is an Interstate Highway in Tennessee that serves Knoxville by connecting the downtown with I-75/I-640/US Route 25W (US 25W). Measuring 2.98 miles (4.80 km) in length, (Note: While the Federal Highway Administration (FHWA) considers the length of I-275 to be 2.98 miles (4.80 km), the Tennessee Department of Transportation (TDOT) posts the final milepost at mile 3.00.) it runs from a northern terminus at the junction with I-75/I-640/US 25W to a southern terminus at I-40. I-275 was formerly a section of I-75, which was rerouted onto I-640 in 1980 after a section of that route was completed.

== Route description ==
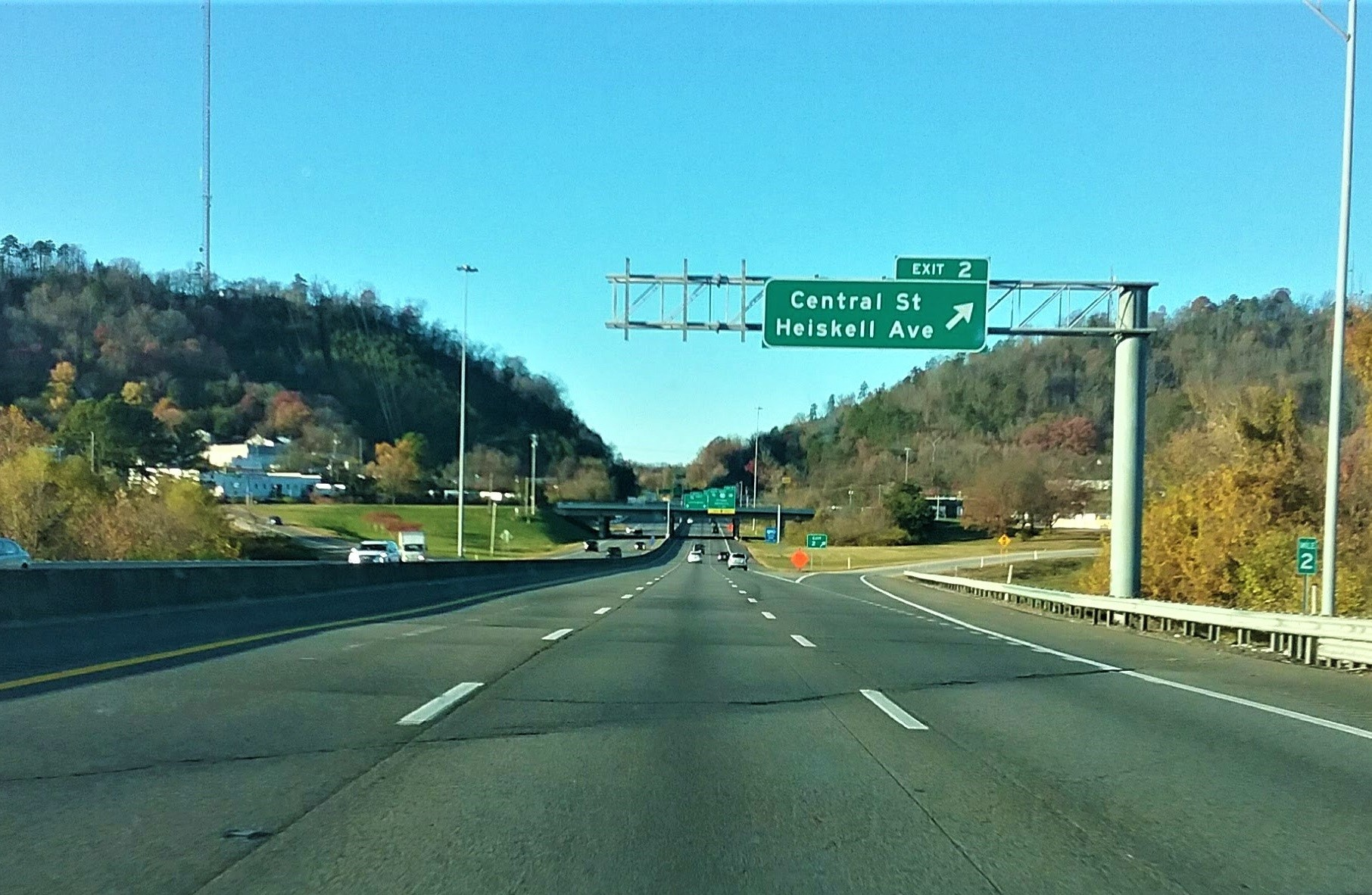
I-275 nortbbound at the Central Street/Heiskell Avenue exit

I-275 begins at a complicated three-level stack interchange with I-40 in Downtown Knoxville. US 441 southbound (Henley Street), State Route 62 (SR 62, Western Avenue), and 11th Street are also directly accessible from I-275 southbound at this interchange, and northbound I-275 is directly accessible from US 441 northbound and SR 62 here. About 0.6 miles (0.97 km) north of this point, I-275 has an interchange with Baxter Avenue and then Woodland Avenue about 0.35 miles (0.56 km) later. The route then curves sharply to the northwest and then sharply to the northeast about 0.4 miles (0.64 km) later and crosses a railroad before reaching an interchange with Heiskell Avenue about 0.6 miles (0.97 km) later. Passing through Sharp's Gap, a low point in Sharp's Ridge, I-275 reaches its northern terminus at a complex interchange with I-75, I-640, and US 25W about 3/4 mile (1.2 km) later. At this interchange, the route crosses I-640, and continues north as I-75. US 25W northbound is accessible from a flyover ramp that splits off from I-275 northbound about 0.1 miles (0.16 km) south of I-640.

== History ==
The freeway that is now I-275 was first planned in the 1940s as part of a series of freeways for the city of Knoxville and was known initially as the North–South Expressway. The route was integrated into the Interstate Highway System as part of I-75, and the southern terminus was the end of a concurrency with I-40 and I-75. Work on most of the route began in March 1958, and the first section, located between I-40 and Baxter Avenue, opened on October 28, 1960, after several delays. The final section, located between Oldham Avenue and Heiskell Avenue, opened on January 24, 1962. A dedication ceremony for this section took place on February 9, 1962.

On December 6, 1979, TDOT submitted an application to the American Association of State Highway and Transportation Officials (AASHTO), requesting relocation of I-75 onto the then-underconstruction western leg of I-640 and renumbering of the route between I-40 and I-640/I-75 as I-275. The application cited the shorter distance and fewer number of interchanges that through traffic on I-75 would be required to traverse. The change was also intended to divert through traffic away from traffic generated by the 1982 World's Fair. AASHTO approved this redesignation on June 22, 1980. Signs for I-275 were posted on December 17, 1980, and the western leg of I-640 was opened to traffic six days later.

Between December 1, 2006, and January 26, 2008, the existing cloverleaf exits (1A–B, 1C–D, 2A–B) were replaced with traditional diamond interchanges to add a continuous third lane in each direction and eliminate weaving hazards. This was done to handle increased traffic flow for the shutdown of I-40 in Downtown Knoxville that took place on May 1, 2008. I-275 was the designated detour route for I-75 northbound traffic during the I-40 shutdown to avoid traffic congestion at the I-75/I-640/I-275/US 25W junction as the ramp for I-75 northbound from I-640 eastbound is only one lane.

== Exit list ==
The entire route is in Knoxville, Knox County.

mi	km	Exit	Destinations	Notes
0.00	0.00	—	I-40 west to I-75 south – Nashville, Chattanooga	Southbound beyond the 275/40 interchange exit ramps are for Henley St. (US 441) & Western Ave./Summit Hill Dr. (TN 62); I-40 exit 387A
0.00	0.00	—	I-40 east / US 441 south – Asheville	Continues as Henley St. (US 441) southbound beyond this exit and the following exit to TN 62 (Western Ave./Summit Hill Dr.); I-40 exit 388 eastbound; southern terminus
0.68	1.09	1A	Baxter Avenue	Formerly exits 1A-B
1.04	1.67	1B	West Woodland Avenue, West Oldham Avenue	Formerly exits 1C-D
2.23	3.59	2	Central Street, Heiskell Avenue	Formerly exits 2A-B
2.97	4.78	3	I-75 south / I-640 / US 25W – Clinton, Asheville	Northbound exit and southbound entrance
3.35	5.39	—	I-75 north – Lexington	Northbound exit and southbound entrance; northern terminus
1.000 mi = 1.609 km; 1.000 km = 0.621 mi
