= Tennessee State Route 169 =

State highway in Tennessee, United States

State Route 169
- Middlebrook Pike
- SR 169 highlighted in red

Route information
- Maintained by TDOT
- Length: 11.7 mi (18.8 km)

Major junctions
- West end: SR 131 south of Karns
- East end: SR 62 / SR 62 in Knoxville

Location
- Country: United States
- State: Tennessee
- Counties: Knox

Highway system
- Tennessee State Routes; Interstate; US; State
| ← SR 168 | → SR 170 |

State Route 169 (SR 169), also known as Middlebrook Pike, is a west-to-east secondary highway in Knox County in the U.S. state of Tennessee. The route is 11.7 miles (18.8 km) long. Its western terminus is in west Knox County at SR 131 (Lovell Road/Ball Camp-Byington Road). Its eastern terminus is in Knoxville at SR 62 (Western Avenue).

== Route description ==
SR 169 begins in western Knox County a few miles south of Karns at an intersection with SR 131 (Lovell Road/Ball Camp-Byington Road). It goes east through suburban areas to have an intersection with Cedar Bluff Road, which leads south to an interchange with I-40/I-75 (Exit 378). It continues east through Suburban areas, where it enters Knoxville and has intersections with Gallaher View Road and Weisgarber Road before passing through industrial areas, where the median widens to the point that there are businesses inside of the median. The two halves of the roadway rejoin each other shortly before having an intersection with Ed Shouse Road, which leads to I-640/I-75 (Exit 1). SR 169 continues east to cross an overpass over I-640/I-75 before continuing east through industrial areas and passing under I-40. The highway then passes through a business district before coming to an end at an intersection with SR 62 (Western Avenue), just east of downtown.

It is known as Middlebrook Pike for its entire length. Although SR 169 passes over I-640/I-75 and under I-40, there are no direct exits with either Interstate Highway.

After a section from Cedar Bluff Road to SR 131 (Lovell Road) was completed in 2007, the entire length is now four lanes. The majority of the roadway is a median divided highway.

== Major intersections ==
The entire route is in Knox County.

| Location | mi | km | Destinations | Notes |
|---|---|---|---|---|
| | 0.0 | 0.0 | SR 131 (Lovell Road/Ball Camp-Byington Road) | Western terminus; continues west as Hardin Valley Road TO SR 162 (Pellissippi Parkway) |
| | 1.9 | 3.1 | Cedar Bluff Road TO I-40 / I-75 | |
| Knoxville | 8.9 | 14.3 | Ed Shouse Road TO SR 62 / I-640 / I-75 | SR 169 westbound and eastbound separate for up to 0.2 miles (0.32 km) from mile 7.4 to 8.5 |
| Knoxville | 11.3 | 18.2 | Twenty-First Street TO US 129 / I-40 / I-75 | |
| Knoxville | 11.7 | 18.8 | SR 62 / SR 62 (Western Avenue) | Eastern terminus |
1.000 mi = 1.609 km; 1.000 km = 0.621 mi

== See also ==
- List of state routes in Tennessee
