= Tennessee State Route 328 =

State highway in Tennessee, United States

State Route 328
- SR 328 highlighted in red

Route information
- Maintained by TDOT
- Length: 8.2 mi (13.2 km)
- Existed: July 1, 1983–present

Major junctions
- South end: US 27 / SR 61 in Harriman
- SR 299 in Oakdale
- North end: US 27 south of Mossy Grove

Location
- Country: United States
- State: Tennessee
- Counties: Roane, Morgan

Highway system
- Tennessee State Routes; Interstate; US; State
← SR 327	→ SR 329

State Route 328 (SR 328) is a north–south state highway in Roane and Morgan counties of East Tennessee. It connects the town of Oakdale to the cities of Harriman and Wartburg.

== Route description ==
SR 328 begins in Roane County in downtown Harriman at an intersection with US 27/SR 61 (Roane Street/SR 29). It goes northwest along Georgia Street and immediately crosses a bridge over some railroad tracks before merging onto Oakdale Road. It passes through neighborhoods before running along the banks of the Emory River and passing through the Emory Gap through Walden Ridge. The highway then enters the Cumberland Plateau and leaves Harriman to cross into Morgan County. SR 328 winds its way north as Old Harriman Highway, running parallel to the Emory River, through rural areas to enter Oakdale and have an intersection with SR 299 just west of downtown. It then leaves Oakdale and the Emory River and winds its way north through mountains and rural areas of the Cumberland Plateau before coming to an end at an intersection with US 27/SR 29.

== History ==
SR 328 was designated as State Route 29A (SR 29A) prior to the 1983 renumbering.

== Major intersections ==
County	Location	mi	km	Destinations	Notes
Roane	Harriman	0.0	0.0	US 27 / SR 61 (North Roane Street/SR 29) – Rockwood, Oliver Springs, Wartburg	Southern terminus
Morgan	Oakdale			SR 299 south (West Main Street) – Downtown	Northern terminus of SR 299
Morgan		8.2	13.2	US 27 (Morgan County Highway/SR 29) – Harriman, Wartburg	Northern terminus
1.000 mi = 1.609 km; 1.000 km = 0.621 mi
