= Solway, Tennessee =

- Unincorporated community
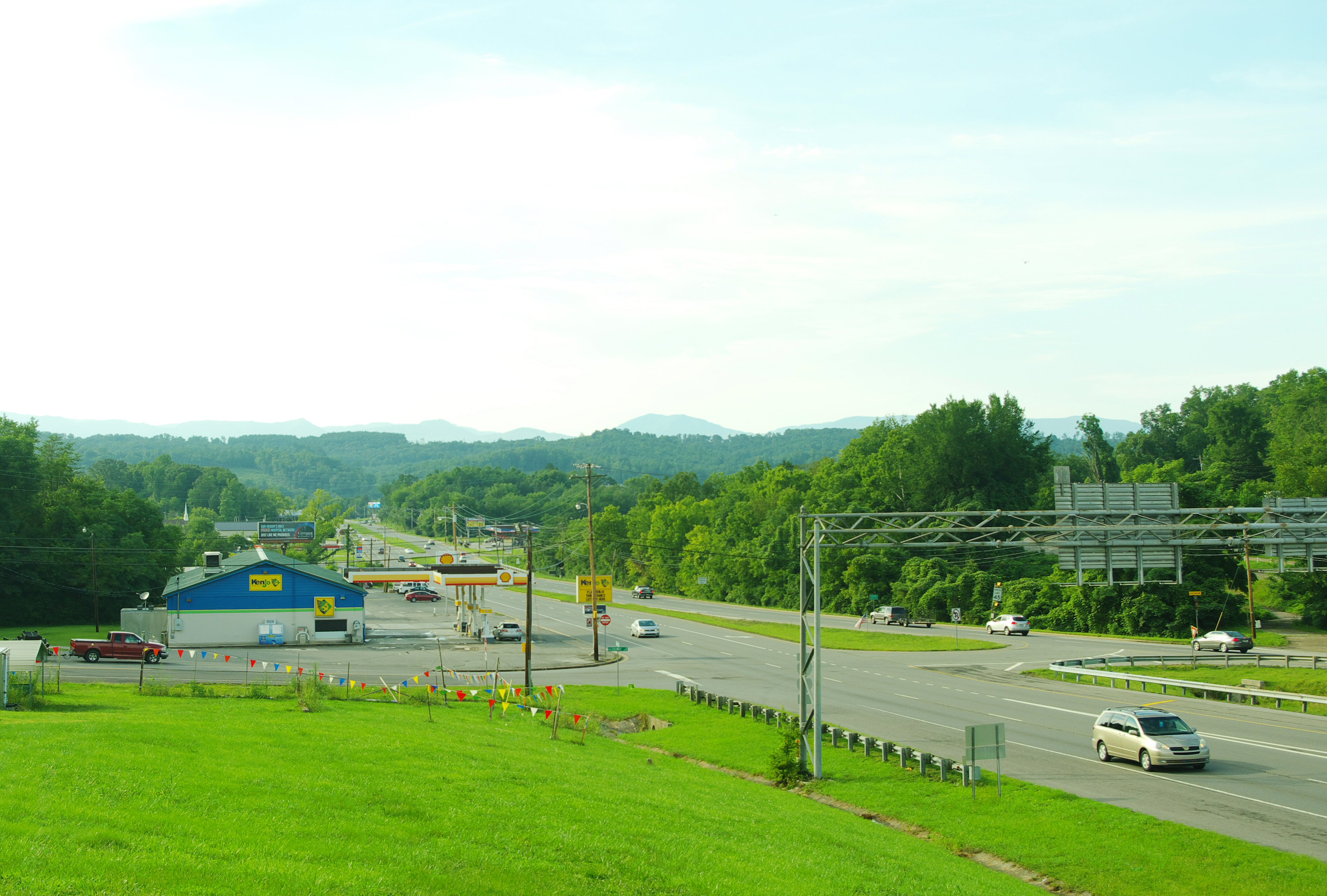
- Oak Ridge Highway (Tennessee SR-62) in Solway

- Location in Tennessee and the United States Solway (the United States)
- Coordinates: 35°58′45″N 84°10′54″W
- Country: United States
- State: Tennessee
- County: Knox

Government
  - Type: County commission
  - Mayor: Glenn Jacobs (R)
  - Commissioners: Terry Hill (R) (District 6); Kim Frazier (R) (At-Large); Larsen Jay (R) (At-Large)
- Time zone: UTC-5 (Eastern (EST))
  - Summer (DST): UTC-4 (EDT)
- GNIS feature ID: 1270815

Solway is an unincorporated community in Knox County, Tennessee, United States. The United States Geographic Names System classifies Solway as a populated place. The area is located between Oak Ridge and Knoxville, just southeast of the Clinch River (Melton Hill Lake), which forms the Anderson County line. It lies on Oak Ridge Highway, also known as Tennessee State Route 62, just north of its intersection with Pellissippi Parkway. Beaver Creek flows through the area.

In 1999, Solway was proposed by Knox County and Oak Ridge planning officials to be included in a 1,000-acre area inside of Oak Ridge's urban growth boundary, which would have allowed the community to be annexed into the municipal limits of the city of Oak Ridge. However, the proposal was voted down shortly afterwards.
