= Interstate 640 =

Highway in Knoxville, Tennessee, United States

Interstate 640
- I-640 highlighted in red

Route information
- Auxiliary route of I-40
- Maintained by TDOT
- Length: 10.80 mi (17.38 km)
- Existed: November 12, 1958–present
- History: Completed in 1982
- NHS: Entire route

Major junctions
- West end: I-40 / I-75 in Knoxville
- SR 62 in Knoxville; US 25W in Knoxville; I-75 / I-275 in Knoxville; US 441 in Knoxville
- East end: I-40 / US 25W in Knoxville

Location
- Country: United States
- State: Tennessee
- Counties: Knox

Highway system
- Interstate Highway System; Main; Auxiliary; Suffixed; Business; Future; Tennessee State Routes; Interstate; US; State
← SR 477	→ US 641

Interstate 640 (I-640) is an east–west auxiliary Interstate Highway in Knoxville, Tennessee. It serves as a bypass for I-40 around Downtown Knoxville and is also an alternative route for traffic passing between I-40 and I-75. All trucks carrying hazardous cargo through Knoxville are required to use I-640. It has a total length of 10.80 miles (17.38 km) and runs approximately three miles (4.8 km) north of downtown through the northern neighborhoods of Knoxville.

For its first three miles (4.8 km), I-640 has a concurrency with I-75, although exits along this segment are numbered according to the former's mileage. For the rest of its length, the Interstate maintains an unsigned concurrency with U.S. Route 25W (US 25W). Both of these highways were rerouted from their original alignments upon I-640's completion.

The route that is now I-640 was first planned by the city of Knoxville in 1945 and initiated by the Federal Aid Highway Act of 1956, along with most of the Interstate Highway System. Initial construction work began in the early 1960s, and for many years, only two miles (3.2 km) of the highway was open to traffic. Work on the remainder of I-640 began in 1977, and the last section was completed in 1982.

== Route description ==
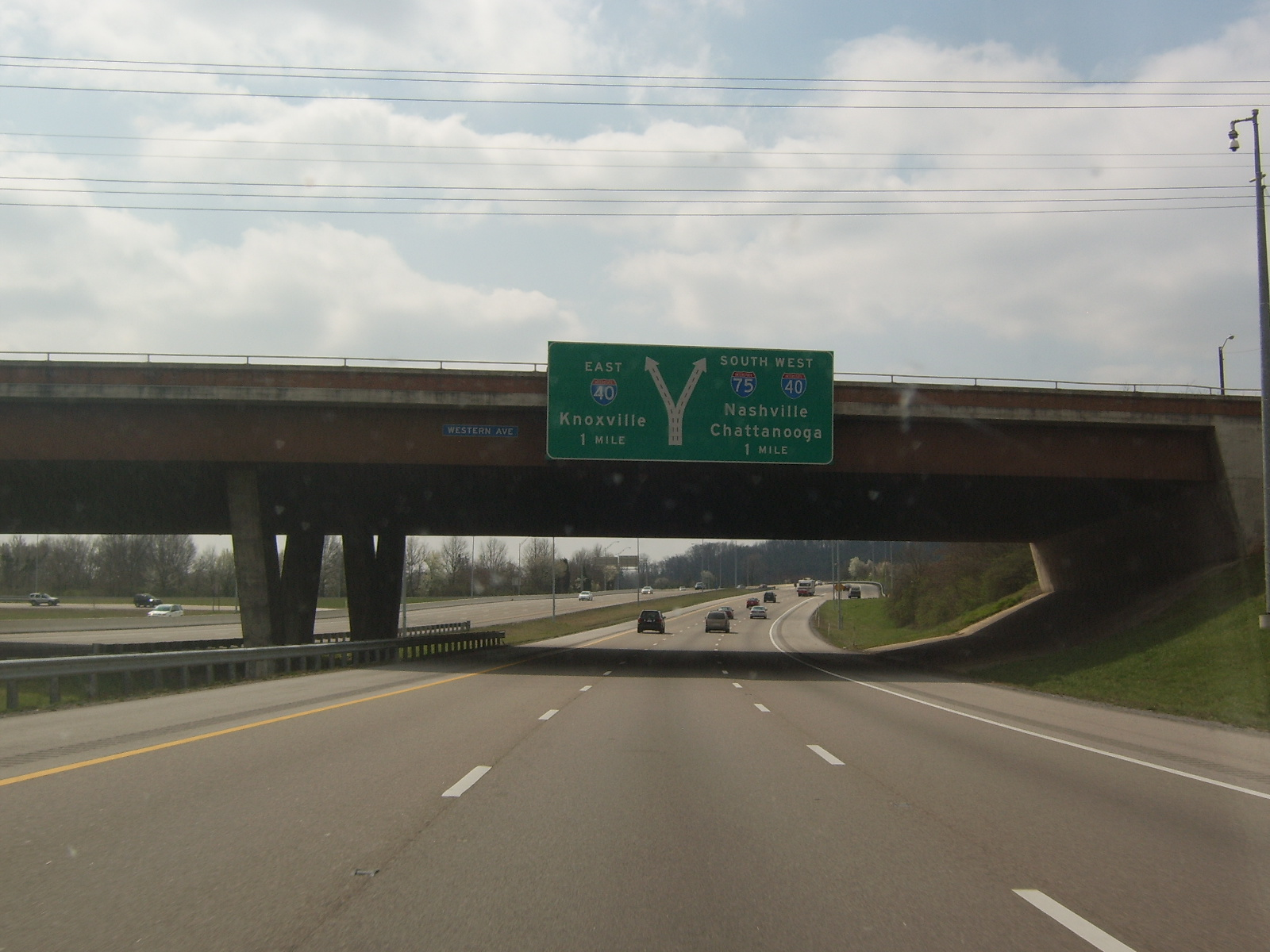
I-640 westbound at SR 62 (Western Avenue)

I-640 has three lanes in each direction for its entire length, in addition to auxiliary lanes between some interchanges. In 2025, annual average daily traffic (AADT) counts ranged from 64,252 vehicles per day at the eastern terminus to 88,773 vehicles between I-75 and US 441. Unlike the other Interstate Highways in Knoxville, however, I-640 rarely experiences severe congestion.

I-640 begins west of Downtown Knoxville at a semi-directional T interchange with I-40 and I-75, where the latter continues onto a concurrency with I-640. Along this section, I-640 is treated as the primary route, with exits numbered according to its mileage. Initially heading northwest, the Interstate immediately passes under State Route 169 (SR 169, Middlebrook Pike) without an interchange. A short distance beyond this point, the highway turns north and crosses a CSX railroad mainline, intersecting with SR 62 (Western Avenue) in a partial cloverleaf interchange a short distance later. It then veers northeast into the southern fringes of Dutch Valley, running along the northern base of Sharp's Ridge. About 1.5 miles (2.4 km) later, I-640 reaches an unusual three-level combination interchange, commonly known as the Sharp's Gap Interchange, with US 25W (Clinton Highway), I-75, and the northern terminus of I-275. A series of towering radio masts on Sharp's Ridge dominate the view to the south here.

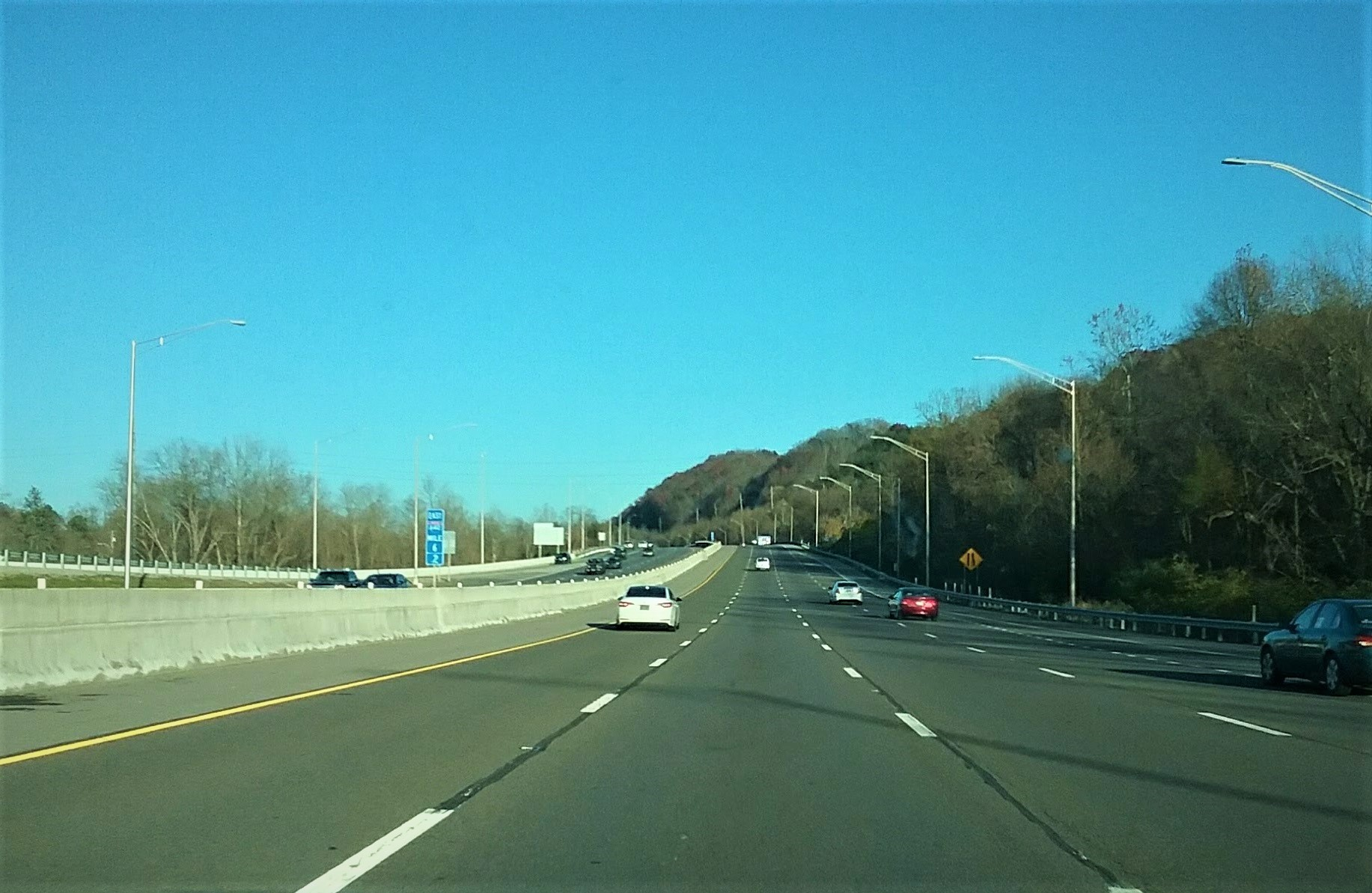
I-640 eastbound near the I-75/I-275/US 25W (Sharp's Gap) interchange

At this interchange, I-75 splits off, heading north towards Lexington, Kentucky, and US 25W and SR 9 begin an unsigned concurrency with I-640. Also at this interchange, SR 9 continues onto an unsigned concurrency with US 25W north to Clinton. The highway then shifts slightly east-northeast and, a few miles later, has a partial cloverleaf interchange with US 441 (Broadway). A short distance later, I-640 crosses a Norfolk Southern Railway mainline. Some distance later, the freeway turns almost directly east. It then reaches an interchange with Washington Pike and Millertown Pike; access between the two is provided via frontage roads on both sides of the Interstate. The highway then gradually shifts south and, a few miles later, crosses another Norfolk Southern mainline and US 11W (Rutledge Pike) without intersecting this route. I-640 then reaches its eastern terminus at a semi-directional T interchange with I-40 on the eastern outskirts of Knoxville. Here, US 25W and SR 9 continue onto a brief unsigned concurrency with I-40, heading eastward toward Asheville, North Carolina.

== History ==
=== Planning and construction ===
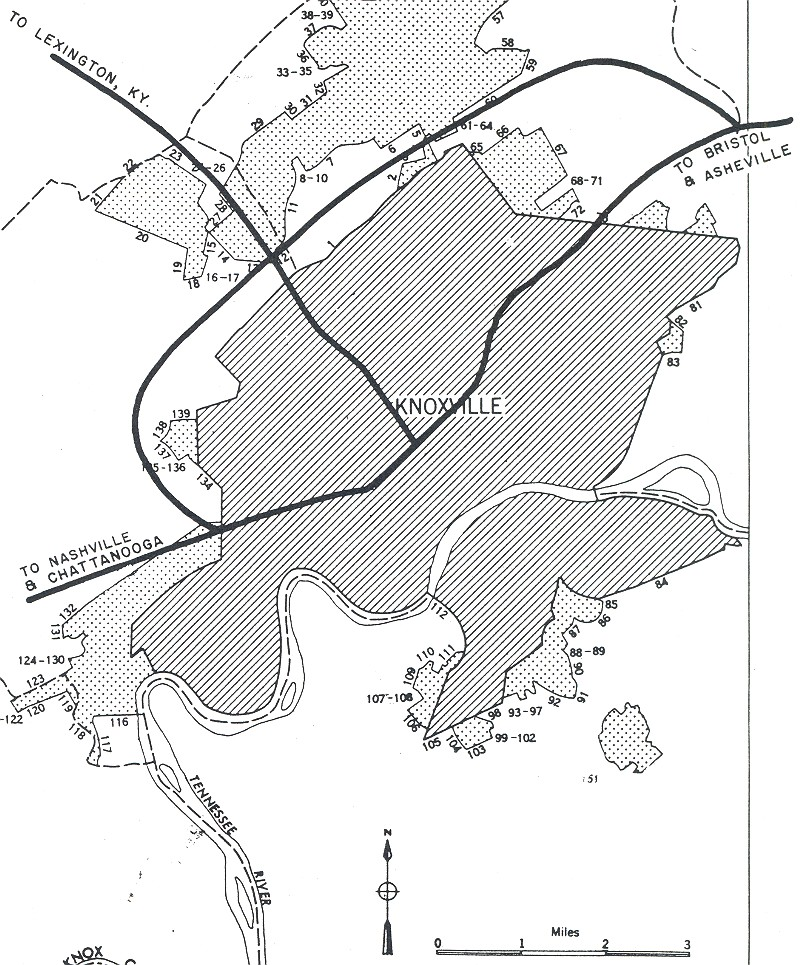
1955 federal Bureau of Public Roads highway plan for Knoxville

The highway that is now I-640 had its origins in a plan commissioned by the city of Knoxville in 1945, which recommended that a series of expressways be constructed throughout the city to relieve traffic on surface streets. It was initially known as the Dutch Valley Loop during its planning phase and roughly followed its current alignment. Planners intended these freeways to be integrated into the then-proposed nationwide highway network that later became the Interstate Highway System, which, at the time, was expected to eventually be authorized by Congress. After the passage of the Federal-Aid Highway Act of 1956, which initiated the Interstate system, the highway was designated as I-640 by the American Association of State Highway Officials (AASHO) on November 12, 1958.

Construction on the interchange between I-640, I-75, I-275, and US 25W began in February 1961, as part of the project to build the segment of I-75 (now I-275) directly south of this interchange, which had begun construction in March 1958. It was completed in November 1962 and dedicated on January 3, 1963. On December 4, 1964, what is now the interchange between I-40/I-75 and a short segment of I-640 extending north to SR 169 (Middlebrook Pike) was opened to traffic, providing access between both routes to local motorists. The connecting segment of I-40/I-75 was also opened to all traffic at the same time. Work on the 2.2-mile (3.5 km) segment between I-75/I-275/US 25W and US 441 began in October 1968 and was completed on December 15, 1970.

The remainder of I-640 was initially delayed by disputes over its final alignment and disagreements between the city of Knoxville and the state over the improvement of nearby surface streets. In addition, new requirements imposed by the National Environmental Policy Act (NEPA) of 1969 required that an environmental impact statement (EIS) be prepared for the remaining segments. Environmental studies took place between 1973 and 1978, with the Federal Highway Administration (FHWA) approving the EIS for the western leg in November 1975 and the EIS for the eastern leg in March 1978. Construction of these sections was then funded as part of a $250 million (equivalent to $705 million in 2025) multiphase improvement project on multiple roads in the Knoxville vicinity that was conducted in preparation for the 1982 World's Fair.

Construction on the section between I-40/I-75 and I-75/I-275/US 25W began in October 1977, and work to modify the Sharp's Gap Interchange, which included construction of two new flyover ramps, began in August 1978. This section opened to traffic on December 23, 1980. At this time, I-75 was rerouted onto this section, and the part of I-75 between I-640 and I-40 in downtown Knoxville was renumbered I-275. This was done in an effort to divert through traffic on I-75 away from the World's Fair. Work on the final section, located between US 441 and the eastern terminus with I-40, began in July 1979 and was opened to traffic on December 21, 1981. Final signage, lighting, and landscaping work was completed in April 1982, and the flyover ramp from I-40 eastbound onto I-640 at the eastern terminus opened on July 1, 1983. Then-Governor Lamar Alexander officially opened both sections by leading a walk along their entire lengths dressed in his red plaid shirt that he famously wore during both of his campaigns for governor. I-640 was the last Interstate Highway to be completed from the original 1956 allocation for the East Tennessee Grand Division.

=== Later history ===
A new exit ramp from I-640 eastbound to Gap Road was constructed just east of the Sharp's Gap Interchange between December 18, 1985, and August 6, 1986, providing direct access to US 25W from the eastbound lanes for the first time. The section of I-640 between the Sharp's Gap Interchange and US 441 was the only section of the route that was originally four lanes. It was widened to six lanes between January 2000 and June 2003. During this project, the interchange with US 441 was also reconstructed, eliminating a loop exit ramp from I-640 eastbound and reconfiguring parts of the other ramps.

Between May 1, 2008, and June 12, 2009, through traffic passing on I-40 through Knoxville was required to use I-640 to bypass a complete closure of I-40 through downtown. This was conducted as part of a larger project called "SmartFix 40" to reconstruct and improve this section of I-40. During this time, the ramps at both termini of I-640 carrying this traffic were temporarily widened to three lanes to facilitate the extra volume.

Between April 2016 and July 2019, the interchange with US 441 was further modified. The exit ramp from I-640 westbound was lengthened, and a new loop entrance ramp from US 441 northbound onto I-640 westbound was constructed. On October 21, 2019, the speed limit on I-640 was increased from 55 mph (89 km/h) to 65 mph (105 km/h), along with the speed limits on sections of other Knoxville-area Interstates, after the Tennessee Department of Transportation (TDOT) determined that the air quality had greatly improved in the area over the previous 15 years and that the vast majority of drivers were exceeding these limits by large margins.

TDOT reconstructed the mainline surface of I-640 in a two-phase project. The first phase, which took place in 2021, resurfaced the stretch between the Interstate's western terminus and the Sharp's Gap Interchange by removing one layer of asphalt and replacing it with two main layers and a binding layer. The second phase, which began on July 10, 2022, reconstructed the stretch between the Sharp's Gap interchange and the eastern terminus by removing the asphalt surface and rubblizing the original underlying concrete surface to provide a base for a new asphalt surface. The deterioration of the underlying concrete had made this stretch of roadway susceptible to forming cracks and potholes, and had been patched and repaired multiple times. This project was initially slated to be finished by November 30, 2023, but experienced multiple delays resulting from higher-than-expected concrete grades in the surface and potholes on bridges. On August 26, 2024, all lanes were reopened to traffic, and final ramp and shoulder paving work was completed over the next few weeks.

== Exit list ==
The entire route is in Knoxville, Knox County.

mi	km	Exit	Destinations	Notes
0.00	0.00	—	I-40 / I-75 south – Nashville, Chattanooga, Knoxville	Western terminus; western end of I-75 concurrency; I-40 exit 385
1.34	2.16	1	SR 62 (Western Avenue)	Separate ramps provide access to SR 62 eastbound and westbound from eastbound lanes via collector–distributor lane; not signed as exits 1A and 1B
2.97	4.78	3B	To US 25W north (SR 9 north) / Gap Road – Clinton	Eastbound exit only
3.43– 3.57	5.52– 5.75	3B	US 25W north (SR 9 north) – Clinton	No eastbound exit; western end of US 25W/SR 9 concurrency
3.43– 3.57	5.52– 5.75	3A	I-75 north / I-275 south – Knoxville, Lexington	Eastern end of I-75 concurrency; I-275 exit 3 and I-75 exit 107
6.04	9.72	6	US 441 (Broadway / SR 33 / SR 71) / Old Broadway (SR 331)	Old Broadway signed eastbound only
8.23– 9.15	13.24– 14.73	8	Washington Pike / Mall Road / Millertown Pike	Partially signed as Mall Rd. South eastbound, Mall Rd. North westbound
10.80	17.38	—	I-40 west – Nashville	Eastbound exit and westbound entrance; I-40 exit 393
10.80	17.38	—	I-40 east (US 25W / SR 9 south) – Asheville	Eastern terminus; eastern end of US 25W/SR 9 concurrency; I-40 exit 393
1.000 mi = 1.609 km; 1.000 km = 0.621 mi: Concurrency terminus; Incomplete access
