= Rockwood Municipal Airport =

- IATA: RKW; ICAO: KRKW; FAA LID: RKW

Summary
- Airport type: Public
- Owner: City of Rockwood
- Serves: Rockwood, Tennessee
- Elevation AMSL: 1,664 ft / 507 m
- Coordinates: 35°55′20″N 084°41′23″W

Map
- Location of airport in Tennessee RKW (the United States)

Runways
Direction	Length		Surface
Direction	ft	m	Surface
4/22	5,000	1,524	Asphalt

Statistics (2017)
- Aircraft operations: 17,554
- Based aircraft: 21
- Source: Federal Aviation Administration

Rockwood Municipal Airport (IATA: RKW, ICAO: KRKW, FAA LID: RKW) is a public use airport in Morgan County and Cumberland County, Tennessee, United States. It is located three nautical miles (6 km) north of Rockwood, which owns the airport, and about 6 miles (9.7 km) west of the Harriman, both cities in Roane County. Situated on Walden Ridge near the southern end of the Cumberland Plateau, the airport is convenient to Interstate 40. It is included in the National Plan of Integrated Airport Systems for 2011–2015, which categorized it as a general aviation facility.

== Facilities and aircraft ==
Rockwood Municipal Airport covers an area of 572 acres (231 ha) at an elevation of 1,664 feet (507 m) above mean sea level. It has one runway designated 4/22 with an asphalt surface measuring 5,000 by 100 feet (1,524 x 30 m).

For the 12-month period ending December 31, 2017, the airport had 17,554 aircraft operations, an average of 48 per day: 71% general aviation, 25% military, and 4% air taxi. At that time there were 21 aircraft based at this airport: 16 single-engine, 4 multi-engine, and 1 helicopter.

== Accidents ==
- On May 29, 1975, a Lockheed Model 18 Lodestar operated by Colonial Bank hit trees near the airport and crashed. Both occupants were killed. Marijuana was found on board.

== See also ==
- List of airports in Tennessee
