= Sunbright, Tennessee =

- City
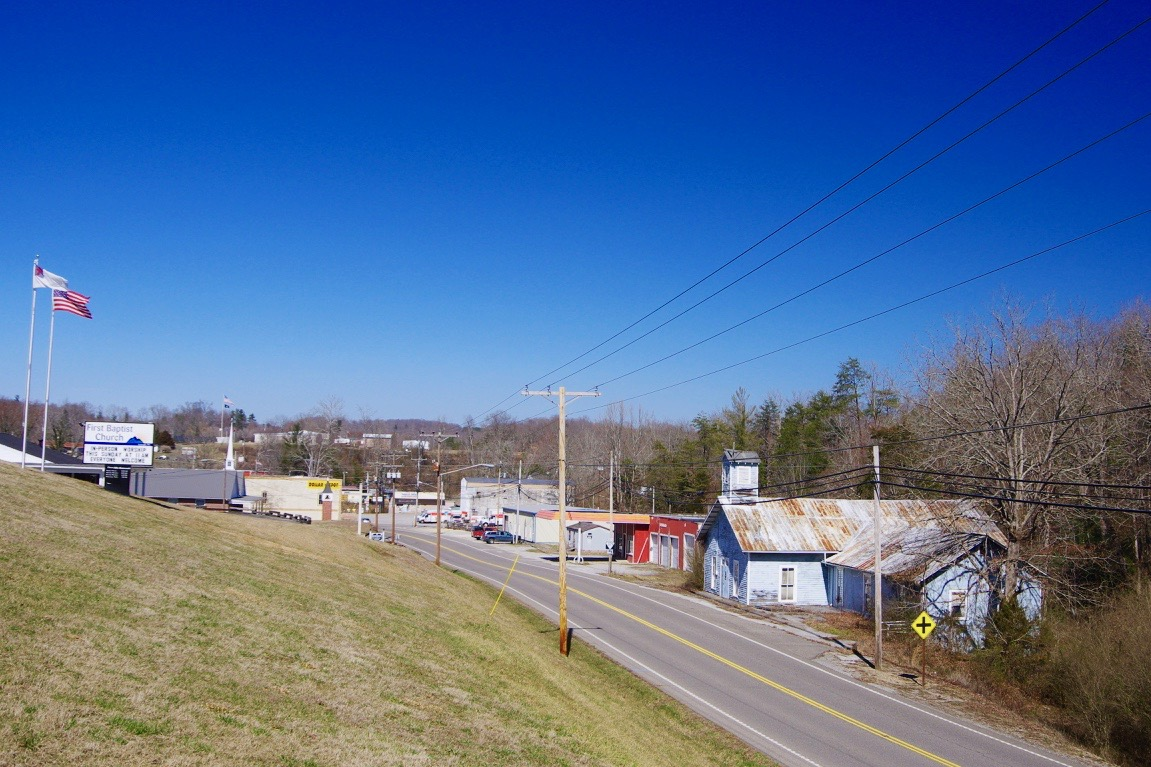
- US 27 passing through Sunbright

- Location of Sunbright in Morgan County, Tennessee.
- Coordinates: 36°14′34″N 84°40′48″W
- Country: United States
- State: Tennessee
- County: Morgan
- Settled: 1810s
- Incorporated: 1990

Area
  - Total: 3.53 sq mi (9.14 km^{2})
  - Land: 3.53 sq mi (9.14 km^{2})
  - Water: 0 sq mi (0.00 km^{2})
- Elevation: 1,394 ft (425 m)

Population (2020)
  - Total: 519
  - Density: 147/sq mi (56.8/km^{2})
- Time zone: UTC-5 (Eastern (EST))
  - Summer (DST): UTC-4 (EDT)
- ZIP code: 37872
- Area code: 423
- FIPS code: 47-72140
- GNIS feature ID: 2405547
- Website: https://www.cityofsunbright.net/

Sunbright is a city in Morgan County, Tennessee, United States. The population was 519 at the 2020 census.

== History ==
The Sunbright area was first settled in the early 19th century. It was originally known as "Pine Top", but was renamed "Stapleton" after the Staples family set up the town's first post office in the mid-19th century. When the railroad was constructed through the area in 1879, the Stapleton depot was named "Sunbright," and the name was eventually applied to the entire town.

In 1916, an oil field was discovered in the hills immediately west of Sunbright, and the city thrived for several years as an oil shipping hub. An oil well was in operation within a year, and 15 wells were in operation in the Sunbright area by 1927.

== Geography ==
Sunbright is situated atop the Cumberland Plateau approximately 25 miles (40 km) west of the plateau's Walden Ridge escarpment. Sunbright is surrounded by low mountains and hills that comprise the fringe of the Cumberland Mountains.

White Oak Creek, which drains Sunbright, is part of the upper watershed of the Big South Fork of the Cumberland River. The Big South Fork's watershed meets the watershed of the Emory River atop Pilot Mountain, immediately south of Sunbright.

Sunbright is centered along U.S. Route 27, which connects the city to Wartburg and Harriman to the south and Huntsville, Tennessee and Lexington, Kentucky to the north. US 27 intersects State Route 329 in the center of town, which connects Sunbright to Deer Lodge. US 27 also intersects Interstate 40 approximately 25 miles (40 km) south of Sunbright.

According to the United States Census Bureau, the city has a total area of 3.8 square miles (9.8 km^{2}), all of it land.

== Demographics ==
Historical population
Census	Pop.	Note	%±
1890	214		—
2000	577		—
2010	552		−4.3%
2020	519		−6.0%

=== 2026 census ===
Racial composition as of the 2020 census
Race	Number	Percent
White	496	95.6%
Black or African American	2	0.5%
American Indian and Alaska Native	1	0.2%
Asian	0	0.0%
Native Hawaiian and Other Pacific Islander	0	0.0%
Some other race	0	0.0%
Two or more races	21	4.0%
Hispanic or Latino (of any race)	6	===== 1.0% =====

As of the 2020 census, Sunbright had a population of 519, with 210 households and 124 families residing in the city.

The median age was 43.9 years. 22.5% of residents were under the age of 18 and 19.5% of residents were 65 years of age or older. For every 100 females there were 87.4 males, and for every 100 females age 18 and over there were 84.4 males age 18 and over.

There were 210 households in Sunbright, of which 34.3% had children under the age of 18 living in them. Of all households, 47.1% were married-couple households, 11.4% were households with a male householder and no spouse or partner present, and 31.0% were households with a female householder and no spouse or partner present. About 21.9% of all households were made up of individuals and 10.0% had someone living alone who was 65 years of age or older.

There were 238 housing units, of which 11.8% were vacant. The homeowner vacancy rate was 0.7% and the rental vacancy rate was 13.2%.

0.0% of residents lived in urban areas, while 100.0% lived in rural areas.

=== 2000 census ===
As of the census of 2000, there was a population of 577, with 229 households and 158 families residing in the city. The population density was 151.8 people per square mile (58.6 people/km^{2}). There were 264 housing units at an average density of 69.4 per square mile (26.8/km^{2}). The racial makeup of the city was 98.44% White, 0.17% Native American, 0.87% from other races, and 0.52% from two or more races. Hispanic or Latino of any race were 0.87% of the population.

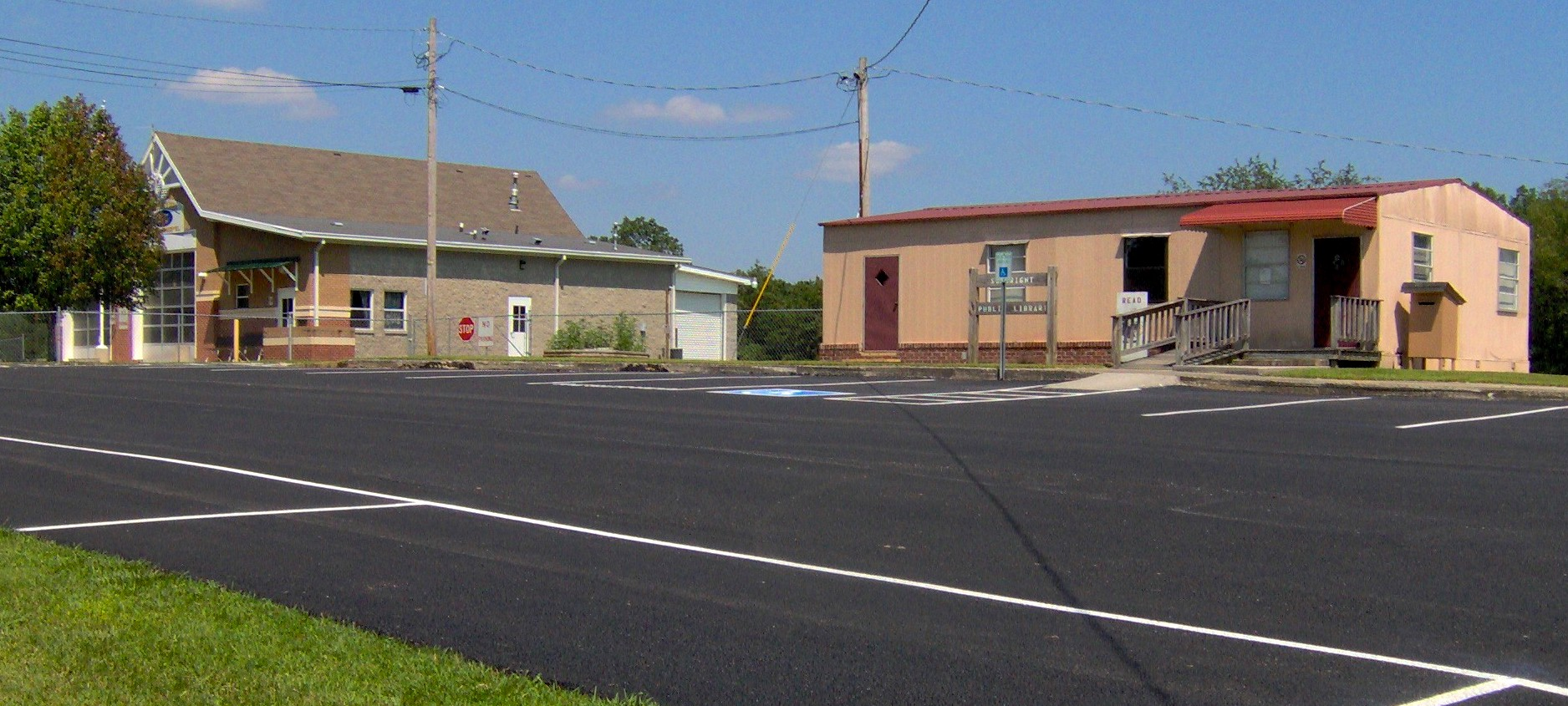
Sunbright Fire Hall and Sunbright Public Library

There were 229 households, out of which 33.6% had children under the age of 18 living with them, 53.7% were married couples living together, 11.4% had a female householder with no husband present, and 30.6% were non-families. 25.3% of all households were made up of individuals, and 10.5% had someone living alone who was 65 years of age or older. The average household size was 2.52 and the average family size was 3.06.

In the city, the population was spread out, with 26.3% under the age of 18, 9.2% from 18 to 24, 28.1% from 25 to 44, 24.8% from 45 to 64, and 11.6% who were 65 years of age or older. The median age was 35 years. For every 100 females, there were 93.0 males. For every 100 females age 18 and over, there were 85.6 males.

The median income for a household in the city was $27,763, and the median income for a family was $31,094. Males had a median income of $28,000 versus $16,944 for females. The per capita income for the city was $12,102. About 20.0% of families and 24.4% of the population were below the poverty line, including 31.1% of those under age 18 and 27.0% of those age 65 or over.
