= Clarkrange, Tennessee =

- Census-designated place
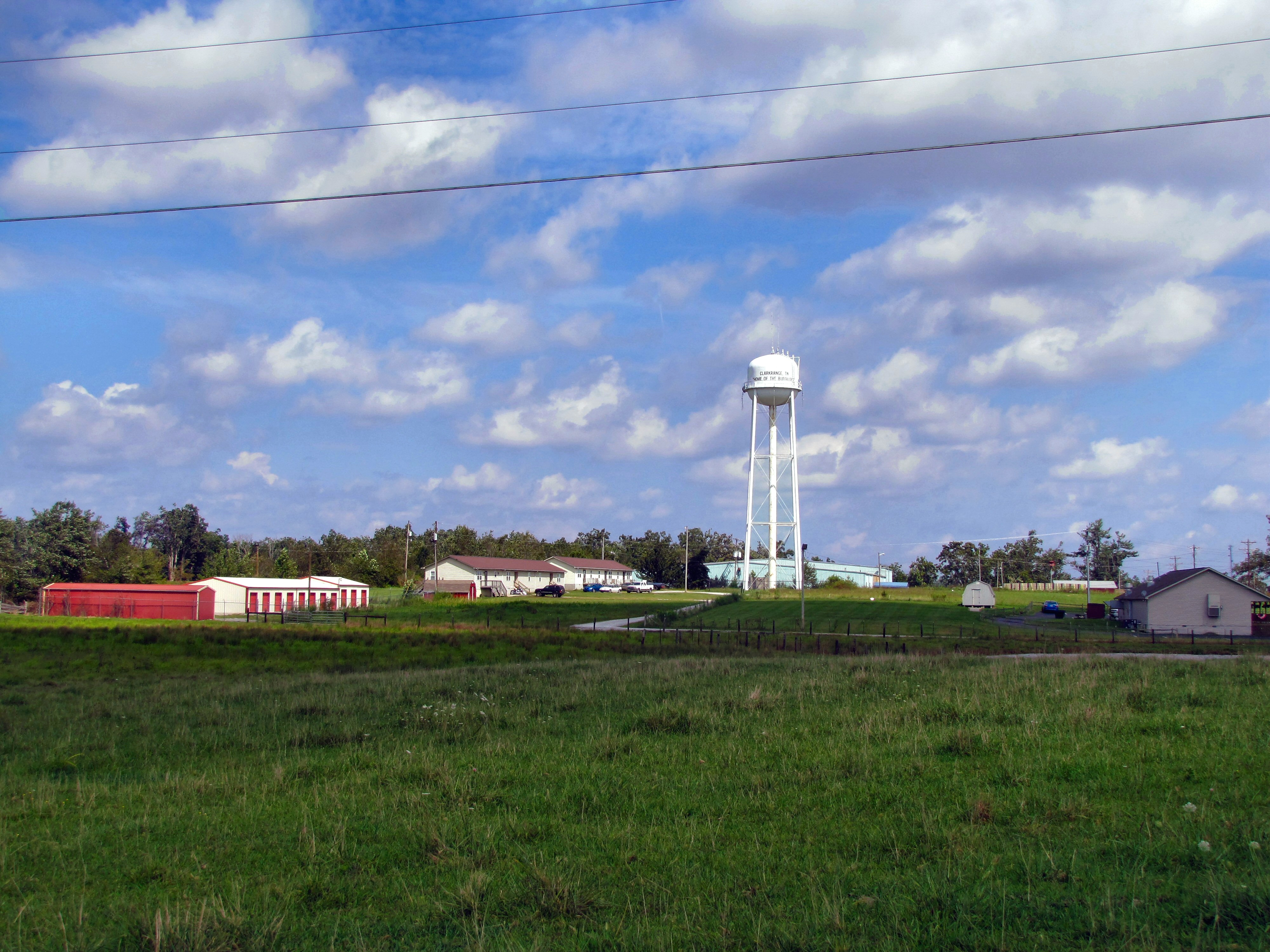

- Location within Tennessee Location within the United States
- Coordinates: 36°11′00″N 85°01′03″W
- Country: United States
- State: Tennessee
- County: Fentress

Area
  - Total: 10.15 sq mi (26.30 km^{2})
  - Land: 10.15 sq mi (26.30 km^{2})
  - Water: 0 sq mi (0.00 km^{2})
- Elevation: 1,821 ft (555 m)

Population (2020)
  - Total: 596
  - Density: 58.7/sq mi (22.66/km^{2})
- Time zone: UTC-6 (Central (CST))
  - Summer (DST): UTC-5 (CDT)
- ZIP code: 38553
- Area code: 931
- GNIS feature ID: 1305941
- FIPS code: 47-15120

Clarkrange is an unincorporated community and census-designated place (CDP) in Fentress County, Tennessee, United States. It is concentrated around the intersection of U.S. Route 127 and Tennessee State Route 62, in Tennessee's western Cumberland Plateau region. The 2010 census reported the population of Clarkrange as 575.

The community has a post office, established in 1885, and which has the ZIP code 38553. Clarkrange is also the site of Clarkrange High School, the only public high school operated by the county school district (York Institute, which serves the Jamestown area, is operated by the state).

Clarkrange is named for Cyrus Clark, who operated an inn and cattle ranch in the community during the late 19th century. Prior to Clark's arrival, the land had been used by local farmers as a free range area for cattle.

Clarkrange has a JROTC raider team, which has placed 1st two years in a row in the national raider competition.

== Geography ==
The community is located in southern Fentress County and is bordered to the south by Cumberland County. The crossroads at the center of town sits 0.2 miles (0.3 km) south of the Tennessee Valley Divide: the south side of town drains to Clear Creek (forming the Cumberland County line), which flows east to the Obed River and then via the Emory and Clinch rivers to the Tennessee River. The northwest side of town drains via Slate Creek to the East Fork of the Obey River and ultimately to the Cumberland River, and the northeast side drains via the North Prong of Clear Fork to the Big South Fork of the Cumberland River.

US 127 leads north 18 miles (29 km) to Jamestown, the Fentress County seat, and south 18 miles to Crossville. TN 62 leads east 29 miles (47 km) to Wartburg and west 16 miles (26 km) to Monterey.

According to the U.S. Census Bureau, the Clarkrange CDP has an area of 10.2 square miles (26.3 km^{2}), all of it land.

== Demographics ==
Historical population
Census	Pop.	Note	%±
2020	596		—
U.S. Decennial Census

=== 2020 census ===
Clarkrange racial composition
Race	Number	Percentage
White (non-Hispanic)	570	95.64%
Black or African American (non-Hispanic)	2	0.34%
Other/Mixed	13	2.18%
Hispanic or Latino	11	1.85%

As of the 2020 United States census, there were 596 people, 289 households, and 241 families residing in the CDP.

== Athletics ==
Clarkrange High School has claimed eight state championship titles in Tennessee Class A Girls' Basketball. The Clarkrange Lady Buffaloes won the title in 1983, 1984, 1985, 1990, 1991, 1995, 2004, and 2009. Also, the JROTC Raiders have won 11 national championships

== Chess ==
Clarkrange High School has also been known for their chess team, winning national championships in 2000, 2004, and 2008.
