= Little Obed River =

Coordinates: 35.9831236°N 84.9894001°W

Location
- Country: United States
- State: Tennessee

Physical characteristics
- Source
  - location: Crossville, Tennessee
  - elevation: 1,690 ft (520 m)
- Mouth
  - location: Obed River
- Length: 10 mi (16 km)

The Little Obed River is a ten mile long stream in the Cumberland Plateau in Cumberland County, Tennessee.

The Little Obed rises east of Crossville and from near its source flows in a deep gorge that it has cut into the rocks capping the plateau, primarily sandstones of the Pennsylvanian Period. The depth of the gorge seems disproportionate to the size of the stream, as is typical of many of the streams of the plateau. The erosive power of plateau streams is considerable because of the frequent and often intense rainfall in the area. The Little Obed and its gorge are bridged by U.S. Highway 127 just north of Crossville; the Little Obed's confluence with the Obed River is slightly northwest of Crossville near the remains of a former bridge on an abandoned railroad that once linked Nashville and Knoxville.

== See also ==
- List of rivers of Tennessee
