= Catoosa Wildlife Management Area =

Large game-management area in Tennessee, United States

Coordinates: 36.076°N 84.846°W

Catoosa Wildlife Management Area is a large game-management area on the Upper Cumberland Plateau in Morgan, Cumberland, and Fentress counties in Tennessee in the United States. It comprises 96,000 acres (332 km^{2}) of wild land administered by the Tennessee Wildlife Resources Agency (TWRA). The Management Area is funded by hunters and fishermen, and is popular with all outdoors enthusiasts, including backpackers, and whitewater rafters. It has many trails for hiking, of which the most notable is the Cumberland Trail. It also has gravel roads and dirt track four-wheel drive roads for motorized exploration. Catoosa ranges from gentle rolling hills to some of the most rugged and extreme terrain in the country. Many rivers and streams have cut deep canyons into the Cumberland Plateau and Cumberland Mountains of the Management area.

Catoosa and several other WMAs are closed to entry between sunset and sunrise in order to reduce the effect of the activities that are considered incompatible to established wildlife management practices. Because WMAs were purchased with funds generated by hunters, the TWRA regards hunting as the main priority on these areas. Off-road vehicles and horses are permitted, but only on certain roads and trails. Overnight camping is allowed on designated areas by permission of the area manager.

== Geography and ecology ==
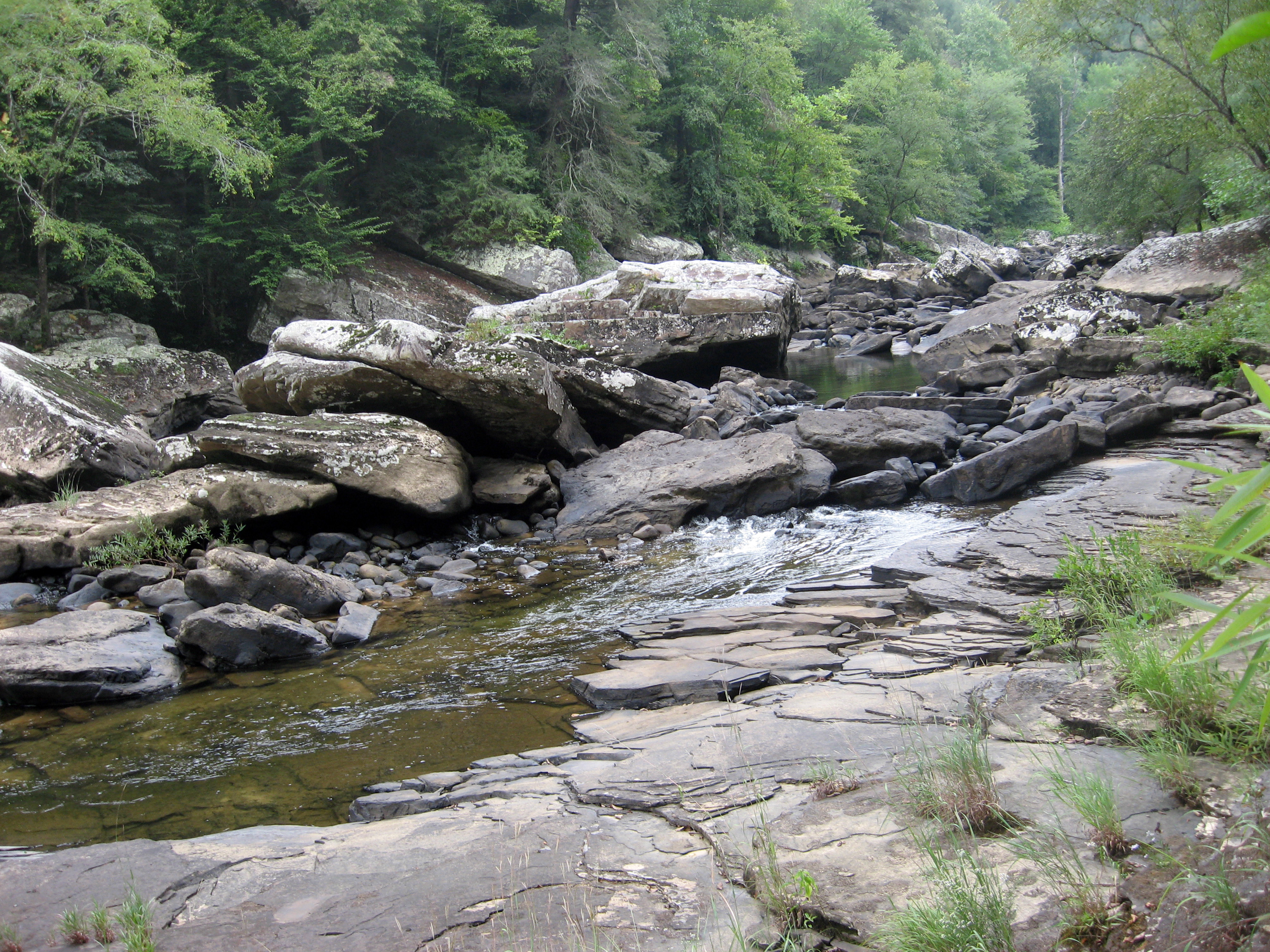
Sandstone boulders along Daddys Creek, a deeply entrenched gorge

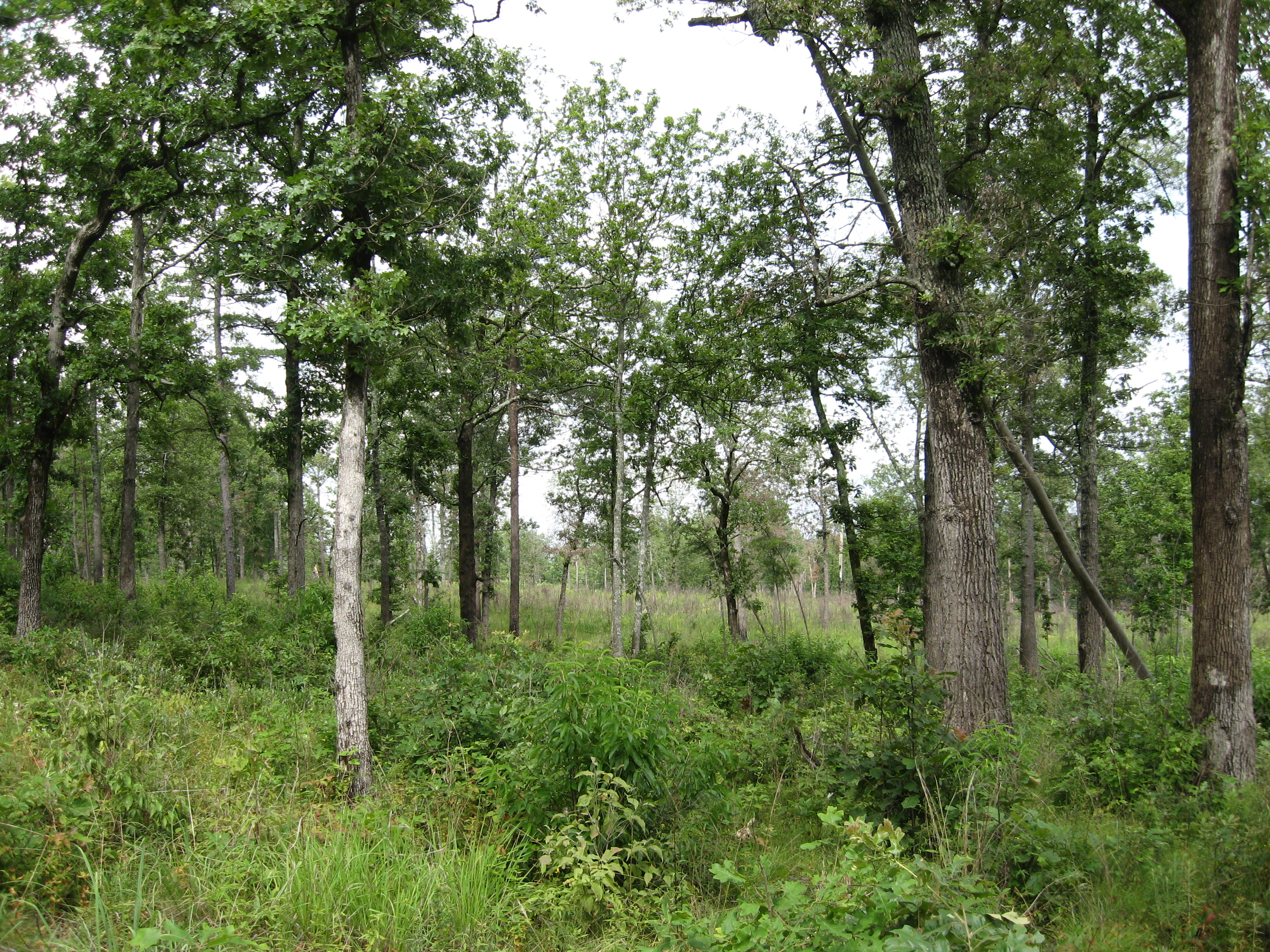
Oak savanna maintained with prescribed fire

The Catoosa WMA lies within the Emory River drainage, which is divided by a number of major stream drainages, including the Obed River, Daddy's Creek, Clear Creek, and Otter Creek. The Emory River meets the Obed River in the southeast corner of the area. The terrain is moderately rolling, ranging in elevation from 1,100 feet (340 m) to 2,300 feet (700 m), with deep canyons cut by the streams.

Over 98 percent of the WMA is forested and the wildlife populations have been restored. The healthy deer herd regularly produces trophy bucks for hunters, and wild turkey numbers are growing fast. Other game animals include European wild boar, fox squirrels, gray squirrels, ruffed grouse, raccoons, quail, rabbits, and mourning doves. Game fish include smallmouth bass, rock bass, bluegill, and muskellunge.

== History ==
The first use of the plateau was as hunting grounds. Artifacts found in caves and rock shelters suggest Mississippian and later Cherokee hunters camped here but never established permanent dwellings. The hunting grounds were visited seasonally by the Cherokees, Choctaws, Chickasaws, and Shawnees, and were the subject of repeated conflicts. In the eighteenth century, longhunters came to hunt game, and English, Scots-Irish and German settlers settled in small hamlets mostly in the valleys.

In 1797, Francis Bailey wrote, "...about five o'clock we arrived at Crab Orchard. Here we found a large plain or natural meadow, containing many hundred acres covered throughout its whole extent with a tall, rich grass." Two years later, in 1799, Martin Steiner wrote, "...then we crossed barren hills where only bushes grew. Now and then one saw a little tree." There were many other such accounts indicating the open nature of the terrain and the presence of great herds of elk, deer, and bison.

Ecologists believe the grasslands arose from lightning-caused wildfire and grazing by megafauna. This natural community was maintained by periodic burning by the Native Americans. The plateau reforested when early European settlers began practicing fire suppression. The white settlers visited the high country occasionally to mine coal and harvest timber before major industry came to the area with the first lumber mill in the 1870s. By 1911, two coal and lumber companies had formed a syndicate that exploited the region until the main bridges on their rail lines were destroyed by a flood in 1929. As the companies cleared the woodland they leased these lands to small farms for arable and animal farming.

The Great Depression prevented the industrial companies from reinvesting in the repair of their railroads and businesses began to fail. In 1940 the Crossville Exchange Club appointed a committee to encourage the state to purchase some of the abandoned land for a wildlife management area. The Conservation Commission bought 63,000 acres (250 km^{2}) from the Tennessee Mineral and Lumber Company in 1942 using Pittman–Robertson federal aid funds. In 1949 the Tennessee Game and Fish Commission, now the Tennessee Wildlife Resources Agency (TWRA), established a tentative purchase boundary encompassing some 90,000 acres (360 km^{2}) within which they began to eliminate interior holdings through a land acquisition program. As of 1999 this program was still in train.
