= Lancing, Tennessee =

- Unincorporated community
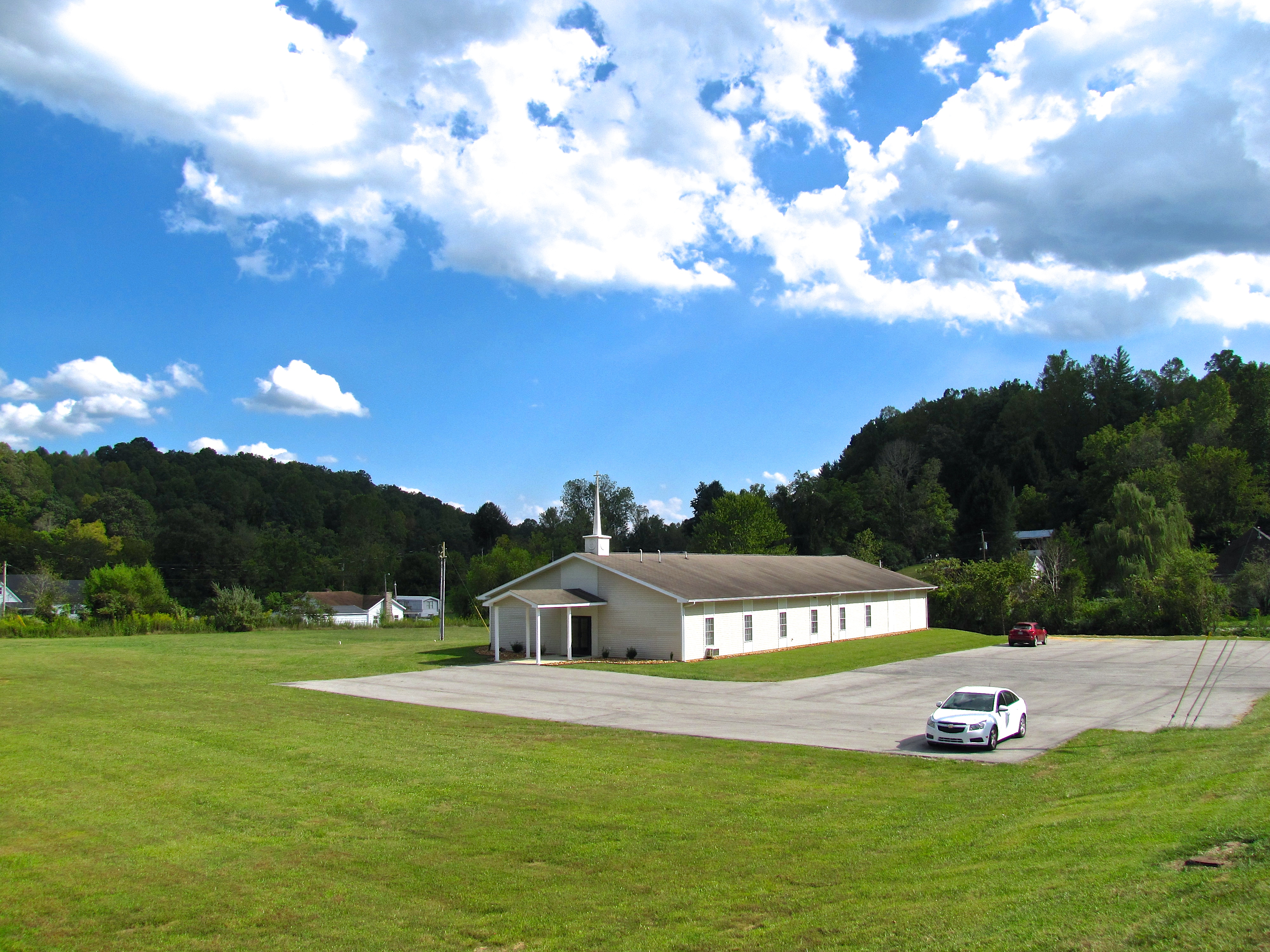
- Lancing

- Location within Tennessee Location within the United States
- Coordinates: 36°07′14″N 84°39′14″W
- Country: United States
- State: Tennessee
- County: Morgan
- Elevation: 1,194 ft (364 m)
- Time zone: UTC-5 (Eastern (EST))
  - Summer (DST): UTC-4 (EDT)
- ZIP code: 37770
- Area code: 423
- GNIS feature ID: 1306664

Lancing is an unincorporated community in Morgan County, Tennessee, United States. Lancing is located along Tennessee State Route 62 and the Norfolk Southern Railway 3.35 miles (5.39 km) west-northwest of Wartburg, and northeast of the Catoosa Wildlife Management Area. Lancing has a post office with ZIP code 37770.

Lancing was settled in the 1860s, and was originally known as "Kismet." In 1879, the Cincinnati Southern Railway constructed a rail line through the area, and named the Kismet rail station "Lancing." The post office applied the name Lancing to the entire community in 1894. Within a few years of the railroad's arrival, Lancing was home to a store, hotel, two churches, and two saloons.
