= Obed River =

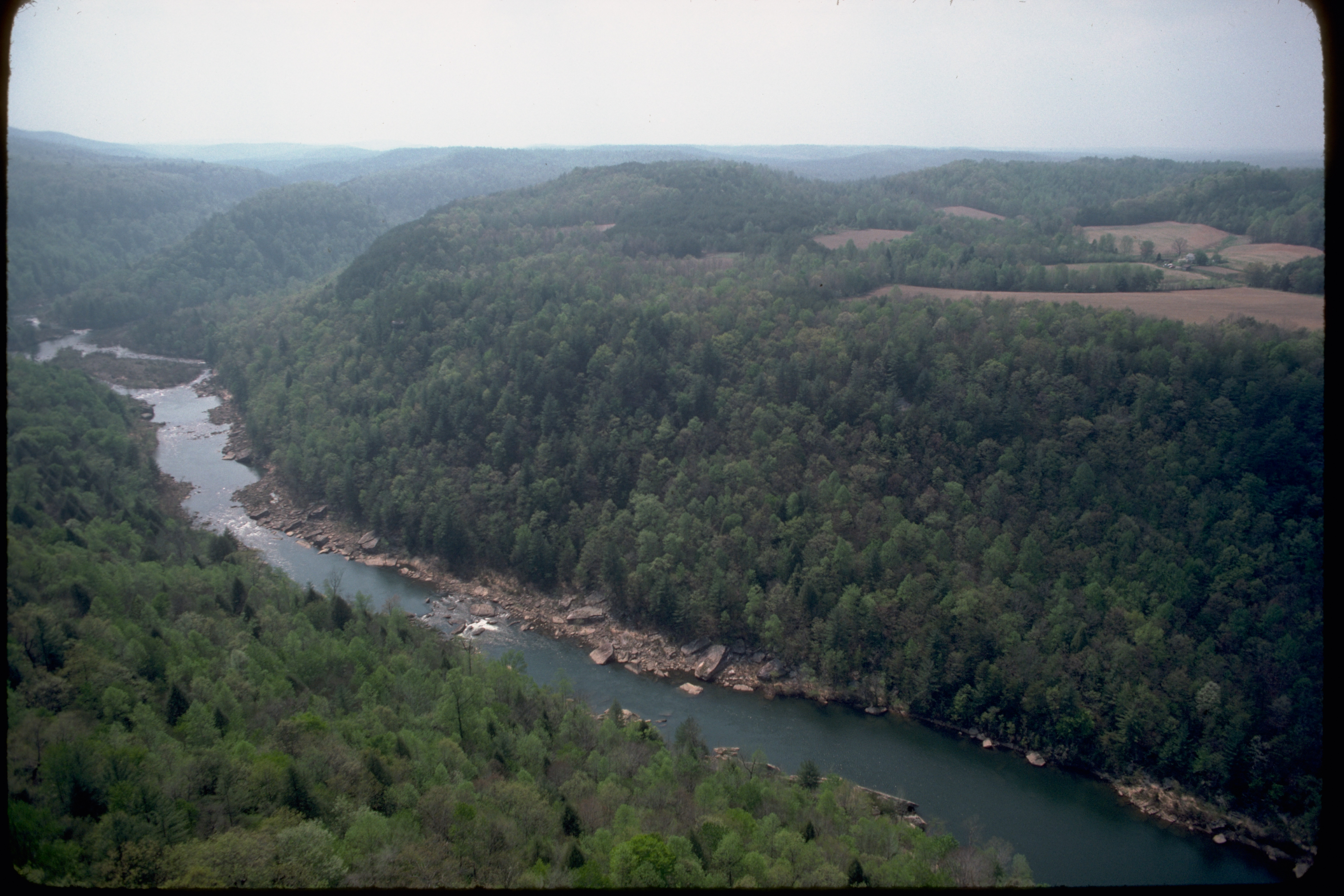
- Obed River

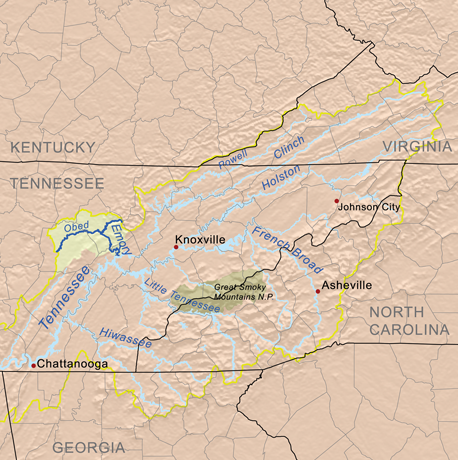
- The Emory/Obed drainage basin

Location
- Country: United States
- State: Tennessee

Physical characteristics
- Source: southwest of Crossville in Cumberland County, Tennessee
  - coordinates: 35°55′07″N 85°06′46″W
  - elevation: 1,860 ft (570 m)
- Mouth: Emory River, southwest of Wartburg in Morgan County, Tennessee
  - coordinates: 36°04′31″N 84°38′58″W
  - elevation: 846 ft (258 m)
- Length: 45 mi (72 km)
- Basin size: 520 sq mi (1,300 km^{2})
- Discharge
  - location: Alley Ford, 1.5 miles (2.4 km) above the mouth(mean for water years 1957-1968, 1974-1983)
  - average: 1,062 cu ft/s (30.1 m^{3}/s)(mean for water years 1957-1968, 1974-1983)
  - minimum: .4 cu ft/s (0.011 m^{3}/s); October 1963
  - maximum: 105,000 cu ft/s (3,000 m^{3}/s); May 1973

Basin features
- Tributaries
  - right: Little Obed River

National Wild and Scenic River
- Type: Wild, Scenic
- Designated: October 12, 1976

Obed River is a stream draining a part of the Cumberland Plateau in Tennessee, the United States. It, and particularly its tributaries, are important streams for whitewater enthusiasts.

The Obed River rises in Cumberland County, Tennessee, just south of Crossville. It is bridged by U.S. Highway 70 between downtown Crossville and the municipal airport, and meets its confluence with the Little Obed River near a bridge on U.S. Highway 70N and an abandoned railroad bridge which was formerly part of the rail system linking Nashville and Knoxville. Shortly thereafter, it is bridged by U.S. Highway 127 and Interstate 40. Except during periods of very high flow, the stream is scarcely visible from these bridges because of the depth of its gorge.

== Obed Wild and Scenic River ==
From there the stream enters a rather remote area. After several miles it is bridged by State Route 298 (Genesis Road). From this point to its mouth it is designated as a National Wild and Scenic River along with Clear Creek and Daddys Creek. The area is maintained by the National Park Service.

The direction of flow changes gradually from largely south to north to largely west to east. Shortly after crossing into Morgan County it receives the flow of Daddys Creek, which is a good whitewater rafting stream. Downstream from this is the mouth of Clear Creek. This stream is also part of the Obed River "Wild and Scenic" designation; like Daddys Creek, it too is a premiere whitewater stream during periods of high flow.

=== Amenities ===
The National Park Service maintains a visitor center located at 208 North Maiden Street in Wartburg. They also maintain the Rock Creek Campground and the Nemo Picnic Area.

== Emory River confluence ==
Several miles below the mouth of Clear Creek is the confluence with the Emory River. Although the Obed River is the larger of the two, the river takes the name of the Emory River below the confluence.

== See also ==
- List of rivers of Tennessee
