= Cross Mountain Mine disaster =

1911 coal mine explosion near Briceville, Tennessee, United States

- Cross Mountain Miners' Circle
- U.S. National Register of Historic Places
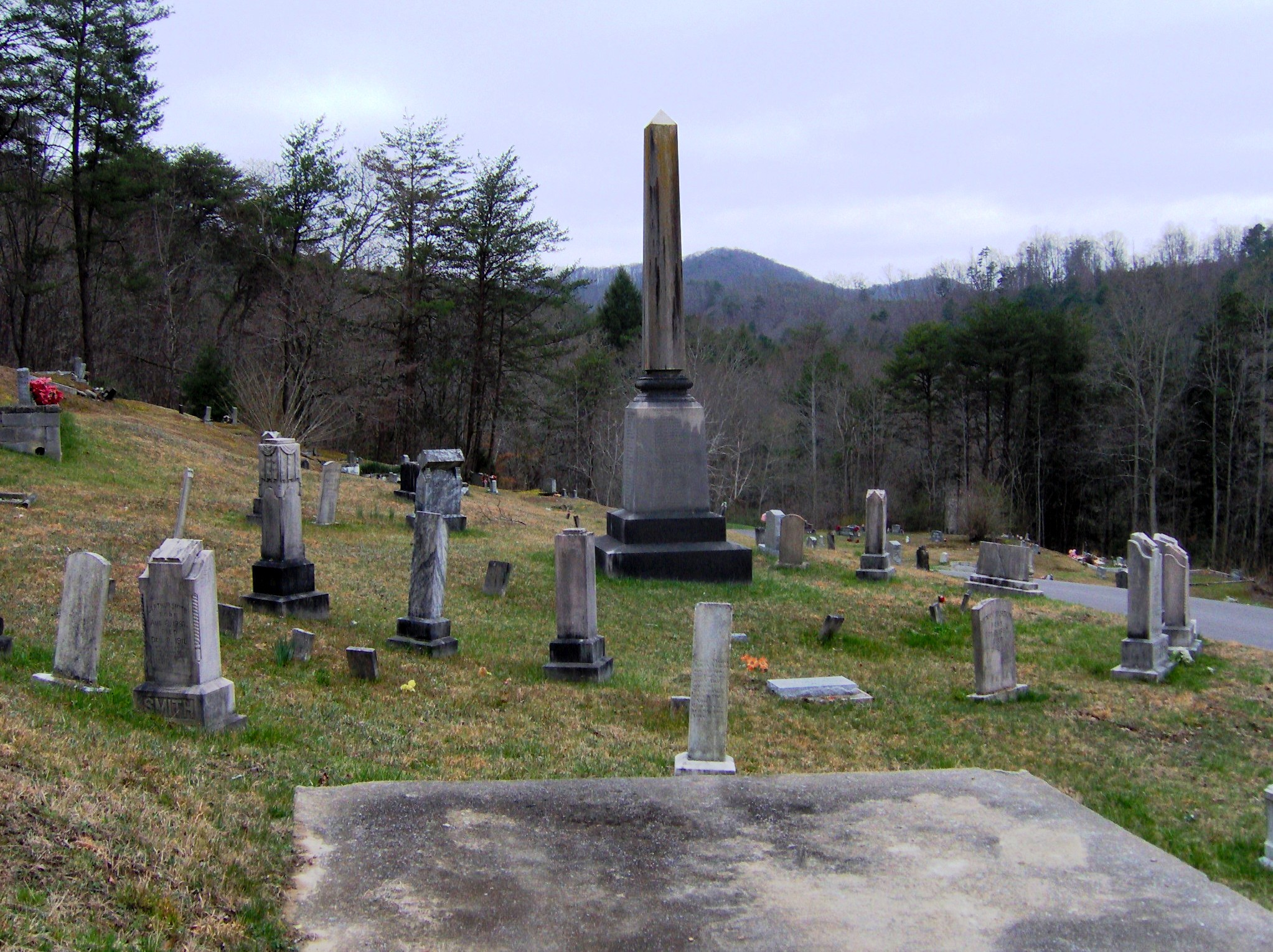
- Cross Mountain Miners' Circle

- Location within Tennessee Location within the United States
- Location: Circle Cemetery Lane
- Nearest city: Briceville, Tennessee
- Coordinates: 36°11′20″N 84°11′41″W
- Area: Less than 2 acres (0.81 ha)
- Built: 1911
- NRHP reference No.: 06000134
- Added to NRHP: March 15, 2006

The Cross Mountain Mine disaster was a coal mine explosion that occurred on December 9, 1911, near the community of Briceville, Tennessee, in the southeastern United States. In spite of a well-organized rescue effort led by the newly created Bureau of Mines, 84 miners died in the disaster. The cause of the explosion was the ignition of dust and methane gas released by a roof fall. Miners would use open oil lamps to provide a light source down in the mines.

At least 22 of those killed were buried in a circular memorial known as the Cross Mountain Miners' Circle, which is now listed on the National Register of Historic Places.

== Geographical setting ==
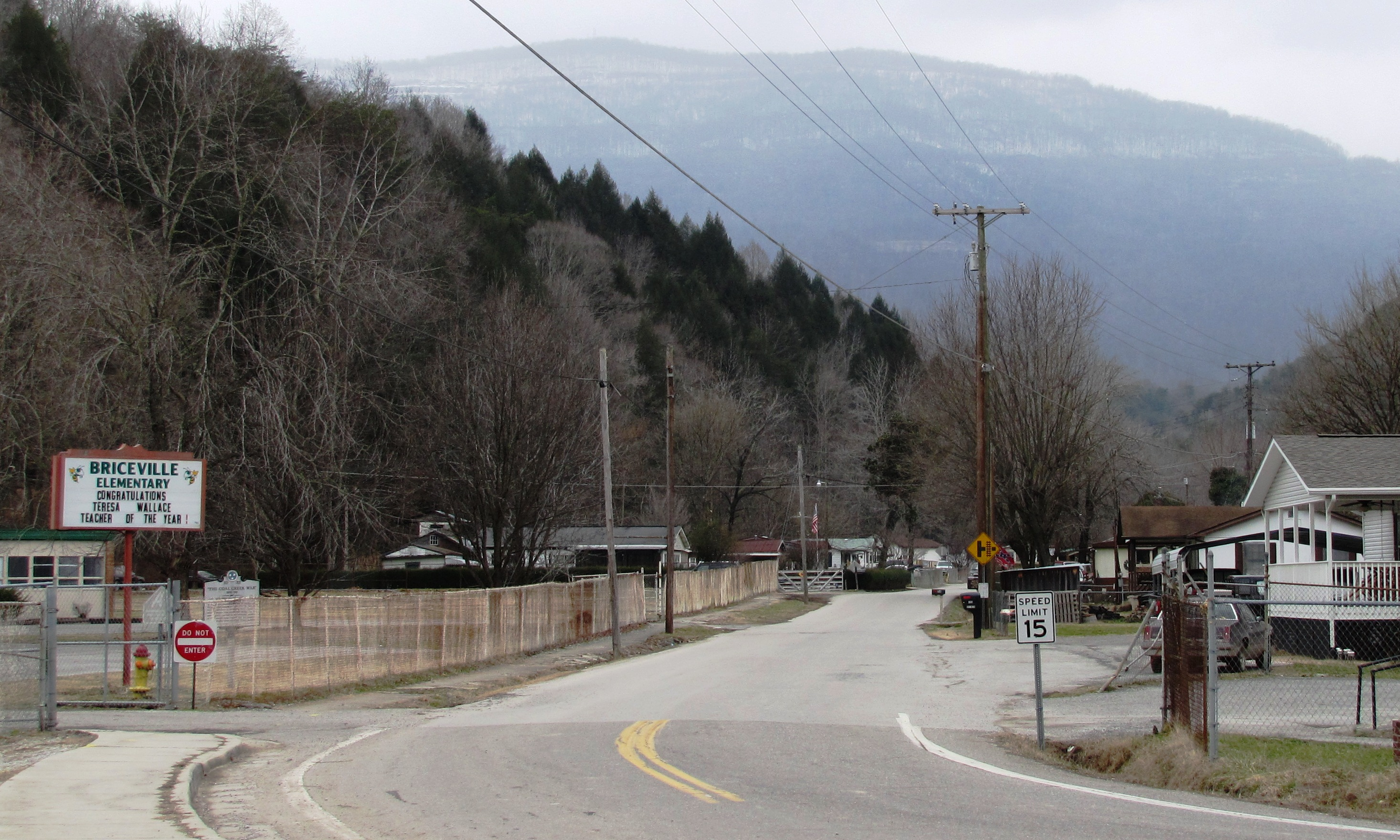
View along Slatestone Rd. from its junction with TN-116 in Briceville, with Cross Mountain rising in the distance

Cross Mountain is a massive ridge situated along the eastern Cumberland Plateau just west of the plateau's Walden Ridge escarpment, in the coal-rich Cumberland Mountains. Rising to an elevation of 3,534 feet (1,077 m), the mountain is the highest point in Tennessee west of the Blue Ridge Province. It is located along the border between Anderson County and Campbell County.

Coal Creek, a tributary of the Clinch River, flows northward along the southeastern base of Cross Mountain, slicing a narrow valley in which the communities of Briceville and Fraterville are located. The town of Rocky Top, formerly Lake City and before that Coal Creek, is located near the creek's confluence with the Clinch, at the base of the Cumberland Plateau.

Slatestone Creek, which flows westward down the slopes of Cross Mountain, empties into Coal Creek at Briceville. Slatestone Creek drains a narrow valley known as Slatestone Hollow, which runs perpendicular to the Coal Creek Valley. The Cross Mountain Mine was located at the western end of Slatestone Hollow, just over 1 mile (1.6 km) west of Briceville.

== Explosion and recovery efforts ==
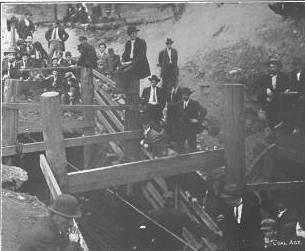
Officials gathered at the mine's main entrance following the explosion

Major mining operations began at the Cross Mountain Mine in 1888, when a railroad spur line was extended up the Coal Creek Valley and into Slatestone Hollow. Over the years, large amounts of volatile coal dust had accumulated in the mine's shafts. On the morning of December 9, 1911, a roof fall occurred near one of the mine's entrances, which released methane gas into the air. The methane gas and coal dust ignited when a miner approached the roof fall with an open oil lamp. The explosion killed or trapped the 89 miners who had gone into the mine that morning. The miners' ages ranged from 16 to 61. The casualties included concussions due to the explosion and suffocation from the afterdamp.

A crowd of miners' families and curious onlookers quickly gathered at the Cross Mountain Mine as miners and engineers initiated a rescue operation. The mine's ventilation fan was damaged in the explosion, so a ventilation fan from the neighboring Thistle Mine was redirected and used to expel the afterdamp and force air into the mine shafts. To produce more ventilation, burning cotton was thrown down into the air shafts. A rescue crew from the Bureau of Mines—which was created in 1910—arrived at around noon equipped with gas masks and oxygen tanks. This team was the first mine rescue team to use caged canaries to detect dangerous changes in air quality. Water was piped into the mine from a nearby brook, allowing the Bureau crews to extinguish fires and erect brattices.

Around midnight, the first three bodies were brought out of the mine. Two bodies were recovered the following day. On Monday, rescue workers followed miners' inscriptions to an area where five miners had barricaded themselves. These miners' names were Milton Henderson, William Henderson, Theodore Irish, Aurthur Scott, and Irving Smith. They were found between the 16 and 17 Left entries of the mine, an area they had chosen because it contained water tubs normally used for mules to drink. Two of the miners were burned, and two had left the barricaded area to find a way out, although all five were found alive. On December 19, the last two miners—Alonzo Wood and Eugene Ault—were found dead behind another barricade. Before suffocating, Ault and Wood managed to inscribe "farewell" messages to their families on the barricade wall. Ault's message is inscribed on his headstone at Briceville Cemetery.

== Aftermath ==
The Cross Mountain Mine operation was one of the first major rescue efforts carried out by the Bureau of Mines. Although only 5 of the 89 miners trapped by the explosion were rescued, the Bureau collected invaluable information that aided later mine rescue efforts. The rescue effort also helped the bureau's public image, and ensured continued funding in the future. Mine safety has also become a mandate of the Mine Safety and Health Administration.

The 84 miners killed as a result of the explosion were buried in several cemeteries in the Briceville-Fraterville area. At least 22 were buried in a circular memorial which became known as the Cross Mountain Miners' Circle. This is located at the south end of Briceville on the steep western slope of Walden Ridge. Shortly after the disaster, the United Mine Workers of America placed a marble obelisk in the middle of the Cross Mountain Miners' Circle containing the names of all 84 miners killed in the disaster. This memorial, around which a large cemetery has developed, was placed on the National Register of Historic Places in 2006. Others were buried at the Briceville Community Church cemetery, among them Eugene Ault, whose monument is inscribed with the "farewell message" he wrote on the wall of the mine as he lay dying.

== See also ==
- Coal Creek War
- Fraterville Mine disaster
