= Cross Mountain (Tennessee) =

Mountain in Tennessee

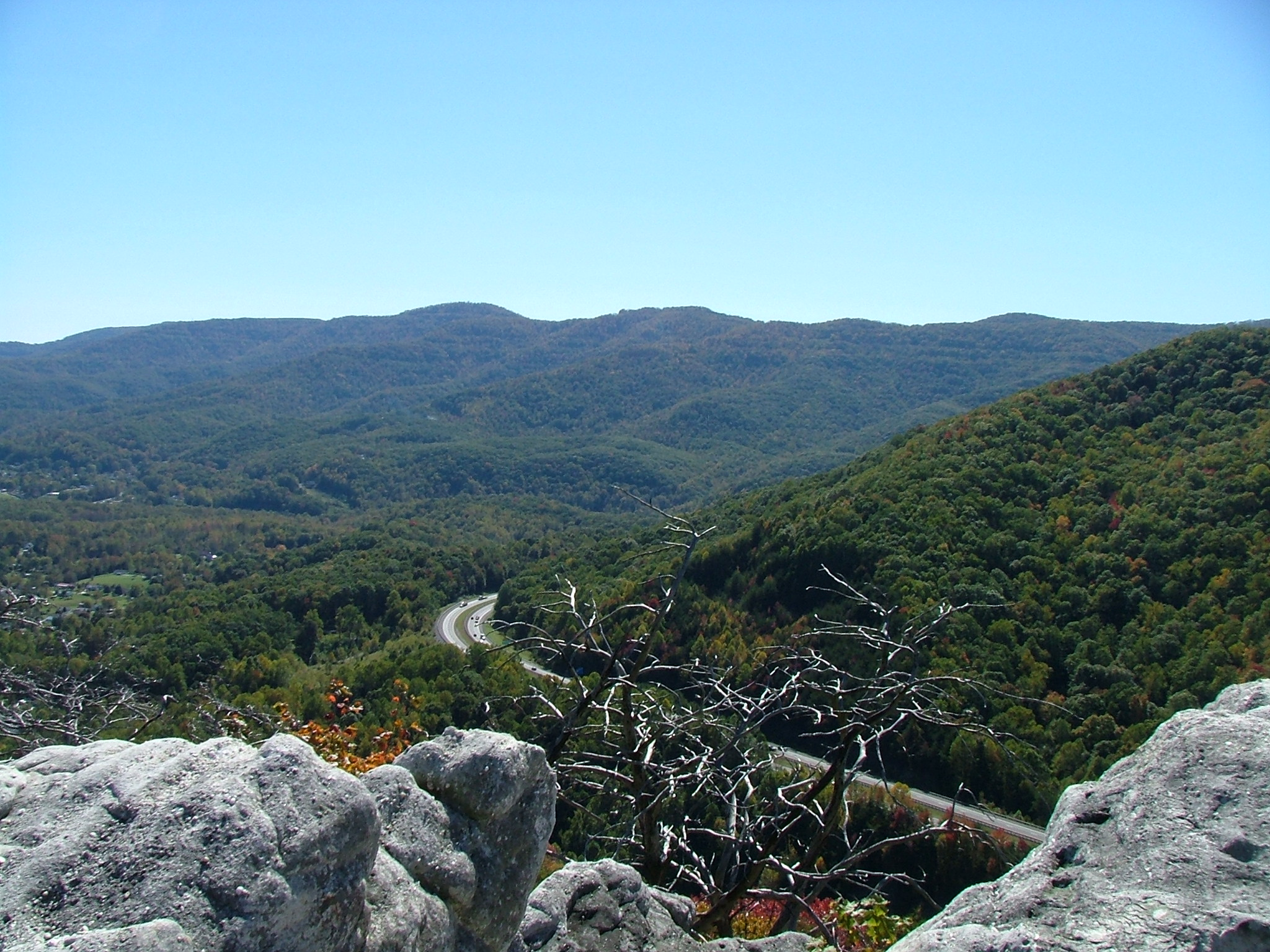
- Cross Mountain from Devil's Racetrack rock formation to the north. Interstate 75 is in the foreground.

Highest point
- Elevation: 3,534 ft (1,077 m)
- Prominence: 2,094 ft (638 m)
- Coordinates: 36°11′54″N 84°13′50″W

Geography
- Location within Tennessee
- Location: Anderson and Campbell Counties, Tennessee, United States
- Parent range: Cumberland Mountains

Cross Mountain is a mountain in the Cumberland Mountains in the U.S. state of Tennessee. At an elevation of 3,534 feet (1,077 m), it is the highest mountain in Tennessee that is not part of the Blue Ridge Province of the Appalachian Mountains. It contains rich deposits of coal, and in 1911 was the site of one of the deadliest mining disasters in state history.

== Geography and geology ==
Cross Mountain is located in the southern Cumberland Mountains, part of the larger Appalachian Plateau province of the Appalachian Mountains. It consists of a series of ridges, running roughly northeast-southwest. Its summit, known as The Flag Pole, reaches an elevation of 3,534 feet (1,077 m), is located on the border between Anderson and Campbell Counties, and contains multiple transmission antennas. Coal Creek, a tributary of the Clinch River, flows along the southeastern base of the Mountain. Slatestone Creek, flows westward down the slopes of Cross Mountain into Coal Creek. The communities of Briceville, Fraterville, and Rocky Top (formerly Lake City and originally Coal Creek) are located nearby. Cross Mountain is accessible via the Cumberland Trail.

== History ==
Prior to the settlement of Europeans, the land that contains Cross Mountain was occupied by the Cherokee. Longhunters from Virginia explored the area in the 1750s and 1760s, and permanent settlement of the area began in the late 18th century. A railroad spur was extended into the Slatestone Hollow near Briceville in 1888, and major mining activities began that same year. On December 9, 1911, an explosion killed 84 of the 89 miners in the Cross Mountain Mine. The explosion was believed to have been caused by the combustion of dust and methane gas that had been scattered by a cave-in near one of the entrances to the mine. The Fraterville Mine disaster, the deadliest mining disaster in the state's history, also occurred near Cross Mountain in 1902.
