= Eldad Cicero Camp =

American tycoon and philanthropist (1839-1920)

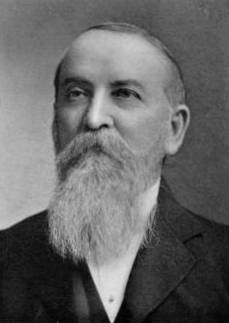

United States Attorney for the Eastern District of Tennessee
- In office 1869–1876
- Preceded by: John M. Fleming
- Succeeded by: George Andrews

Personal details
- Born: August 1, 1839; Mount Vernon, Ohio, United States
- Died: November 21, 1920 (aged 81); Knoxville, Tennessee, United States
- Resting place: Old Gray Cemetery; Knoxville, Tennessee
- Political party: Republican Party
- Spouse: Nettie Dunn
- Occupation: Attorney, entrepreneur

Eldad Cicero Camp Jr. (August 1, 1839 – November 21, 1920) was an American coal tycoon, attorney and philanthropist, active primarily in Knoxville, Tennessee, and the vicinity. He was president of the Coal Creek Coal Company, president of the Virginia-Tennessee Coal Company, a director of Knoxville's Third National Bank, and at his height, was one of the wealthiest men in East Tennessee. His prominent North Knoxville mansion, Greystone, is listed on the National Register of Historic Places.

A Union officer during the Civil War, Camp arrived in Knoxville in 1865. In 1868, he killed Confederate Colonel Henry Ashby in a notorious shootout in downtown Knoxville. Camp first rose to prominence as U.S. District Attorney for East Tennessee, serving from 1869 until 1871. During the late 1860s, he organized the Coal Creek Coal Company, which in subsequent decades grew to become one of the major coal producing companies in the region. In the 1890s, Camp helped establish Knoxville's Florence Crittenton Home and Camp's Home for Friendless Women.

== Biography ==
=== Early life ===
Camp was born in 1839 on the Mount Vernon, Ohio, farm of his parents, Eldad Cicero Camp Sr. (1804–1896) and Minerva Mallory Hinman. His parents were both primarily of English descent. Camp attended school in nearby Chesterville and trained to be a teacher. He taught school at Richmond, Kentucky, from 1857 to 1860, and at Platte City, Missouri, from 1860 until 1861. While in Platte City, he began studying law.

At the outbreak of the Civil War, Camp returned to Ohio and enlisted in the 142nd Regiment of the Ohio Volunteer Infantry. Camp saw action at the Battle of Island Number Ten and the Siege of Petersburg. In June 1864, Camp's regiment successfully guided supplies through the hostile Virginia wilderness to reinforce General Ulysses S. Grant at the Battle of Cold Harbor. In February 1865, shortly before he was mustered out with the rank of sergeant major, Camp accompanied General Joseph Alexander Cooper to Knoxville. Impressed with the virtually untouched mineral resources of the surrounding region, Camp decided to make the city his permanent home.

=== Camp – Ashby shooting ===
Shortly after the war, Camp became embroiled in a quarrel with Colonel Henry Ashby, a native Virginian who had fought for the Confederacy. In 1866, Camp accused Ashby of cruelly mistreating 431 Union soldiers that had been captured by Confederate forces in 1862, leading to Ashby's arrest and indictment for treason. Ashby posted bail and fled to Atlanta but returned to Knoxville in 1868 after the charges were dropped.

On July 9, 1868, Ashby encountered Camp on Gay Street, and a brief struggle ensued, with Ashby attacking Camp with a cane and Camp striking Ashby with an umbrella. The following day, Ashby confronted Camp at the latter's law office near the corner of what is now Walnut and Main. According to some reports, Ashby attempted to strike Camp with a cane, and according to others, Ashby drew a derringer. In any case, Camp drew a pistol and fired, killing Ashby.

After Camp was arrested for murder, his bail was posted by several former Unionists, among them future Knoxville Journal editor William Rule. Knoxville's pro-Democratic newspaper, the Daily Press and Herald, dubbed Camp a cold-blooded killer, while the city's pro-Republican paper, the Knoxville Whig, hailed him as a hero. The county's acting district attorney eventually issued a nolle prosequi, and Camp was never prosecuted for the killing.

=== District attorney ===
In 1869, Camp was appointed United States Attorney for the Eastern District of Tennessee by President Ulysses S. Grant, having been recommended for the position by Congressman Horace Maynard. Most of his cases involved false pension and bounty claims, although he prosecuted 63 moonshining cases during his tenure. He argued several cases before the Tennessee Supreme Court, among them a case regarding the validity of payments in Confederate money during the Civil War (co-argued with future congressman Leonidas Houk), a case involving a horse stolen by federal soldiers during the war, and a case involving a man who claimed his son-in-law tricked him into selling his property while he was intoxicated. In 1871, Camp was suspended by Grant on recommendation from Senator William G. Brownlow and congressmen Maynard and Roderick Butler, whose constituents were complaining that Camp was bringing too many prosecutions and thus enriching himself with legal fees. While he was reinstated in November 1871, Camp resigned the office just three weeks after his reinstatement for what he believed was the good of the Republican Party.

=== Business interests ===
In 1868, shortly after railroad construction connected the Coal Creek Valley of western Anderson County with Knoxville, Camp organized the Coal Creek Coal Company and opened a mine near the center of the valley, around which the mining village of Fraterville developed. This company initially produced approximately 30,000 tons of coal per year. By 1900, the company was operating three mines in the valley— the Fraterville and Hollow Entry mines at Fraterville, and a mine at Thistle Switch (near Briceville)— and its annual production had increased to over 200,000 tons. Coal Creek Coal was one of the few mining companies in Tennessee that never used convict leasing and as a result avoided much of the strife that plagued most Cumberland Plateau-area mining companies during the Coal Creek War of 1891-92.

In 1902, the Fraterville Mine disaster, the deadliest mine explosion in the state's history, occurred at Coal Creek Coal's Fraterville Mine. Camp's son George, who was superintendent of the company's Fraterville mines, oversaw the rescue operations in the explosion's aftermath. In spite of his efforts, 216 miners died. The company was subsequently sued for over one million dollars in damages, but the suit (Slover, et al. v. Coal Creek Coal Company) was thrown out.

Along with Coal Creek Coal, Camp also served as president of two other companies: the Virginia–Tennessee Coal Company, which operated mines in the Raven, Virginia, area, and the Knoxville Acetylene Company, which manufactured gas generators. During the 1890s, Camp was a director of Knoxville's Third National Bank, serving on the bank's board alongside Knoxville Iron Company president W.R. Tuttle. In 1887, Camp co-organized a streetcar line, the Knoxville and Edgewood Street Railroad Company.

=== Civic improvements ===
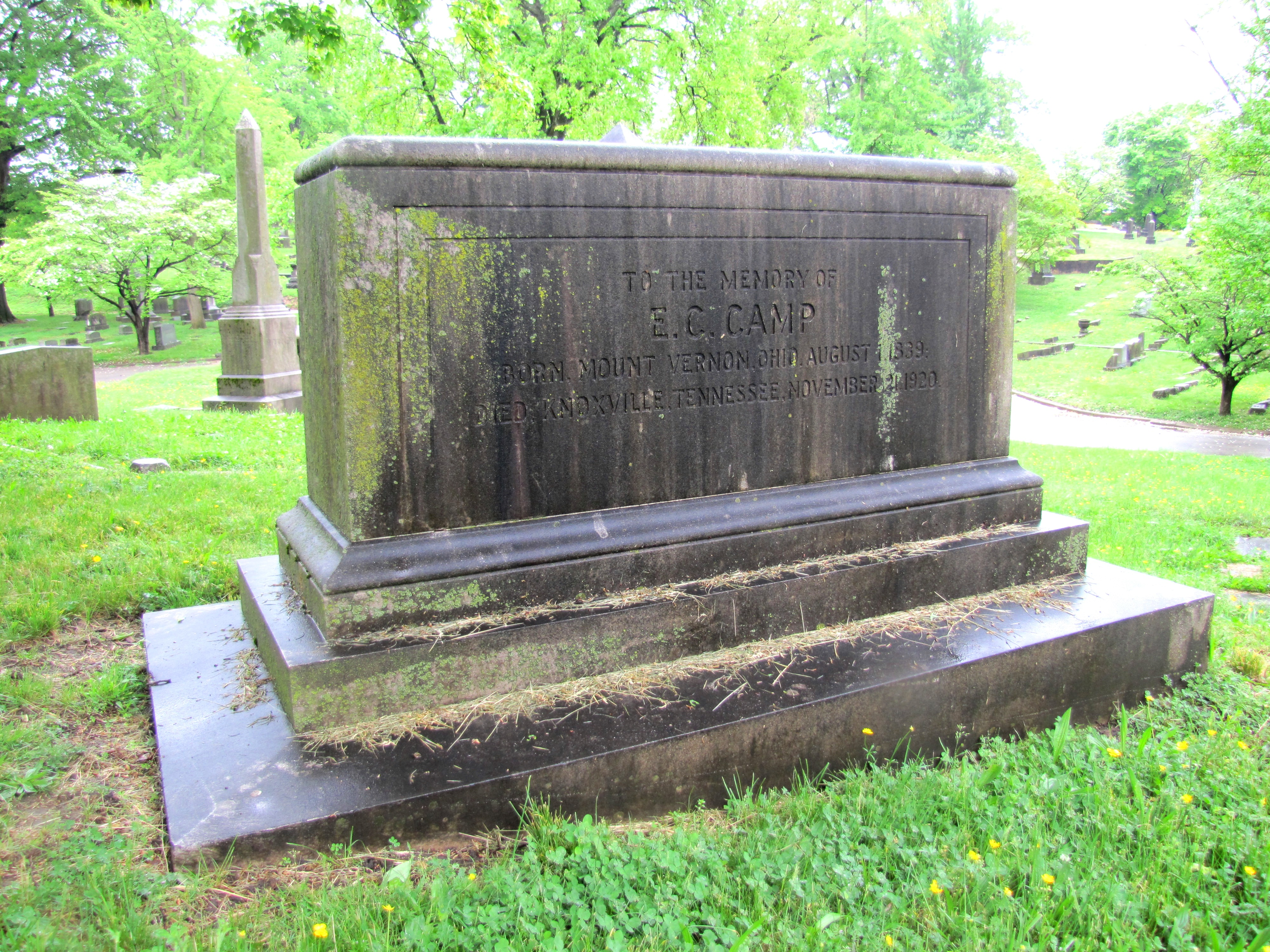
Camp's grave at Old Gray Cemetery

During the late 19th and early 20th centuries, Camp advocated numerous civic and infrastructural improvements. He was vice president of the National Rivers and Harbors Congress in 1910 and persistently sought better shipping facilities and lower freight rates on the Tennessee River. While he was focused primarily on his business interests, he remained active in the Tennessee Bar Association and continuously pushed for stricter bar admission requirements.

In 1895, Camp helped establish the Knoxville's Florence Crittenton Home, which helped unwed mothers find gainful employment. Around the same time, he established Camp's Home for Friendless Women, which cared for destitute elderly women.

=== Death ===
Camp died in Knoxville on November 21, 1920, and was buried at Old Gray Cemetery.

== See also ==
- Charles McClung McGhee
- Edward J. Sanford
