= Briceville Community Church =

Historic church in Tennessee, United States

- Briceville Community Church and Cemetery
- U.S. National Register of Historic Places
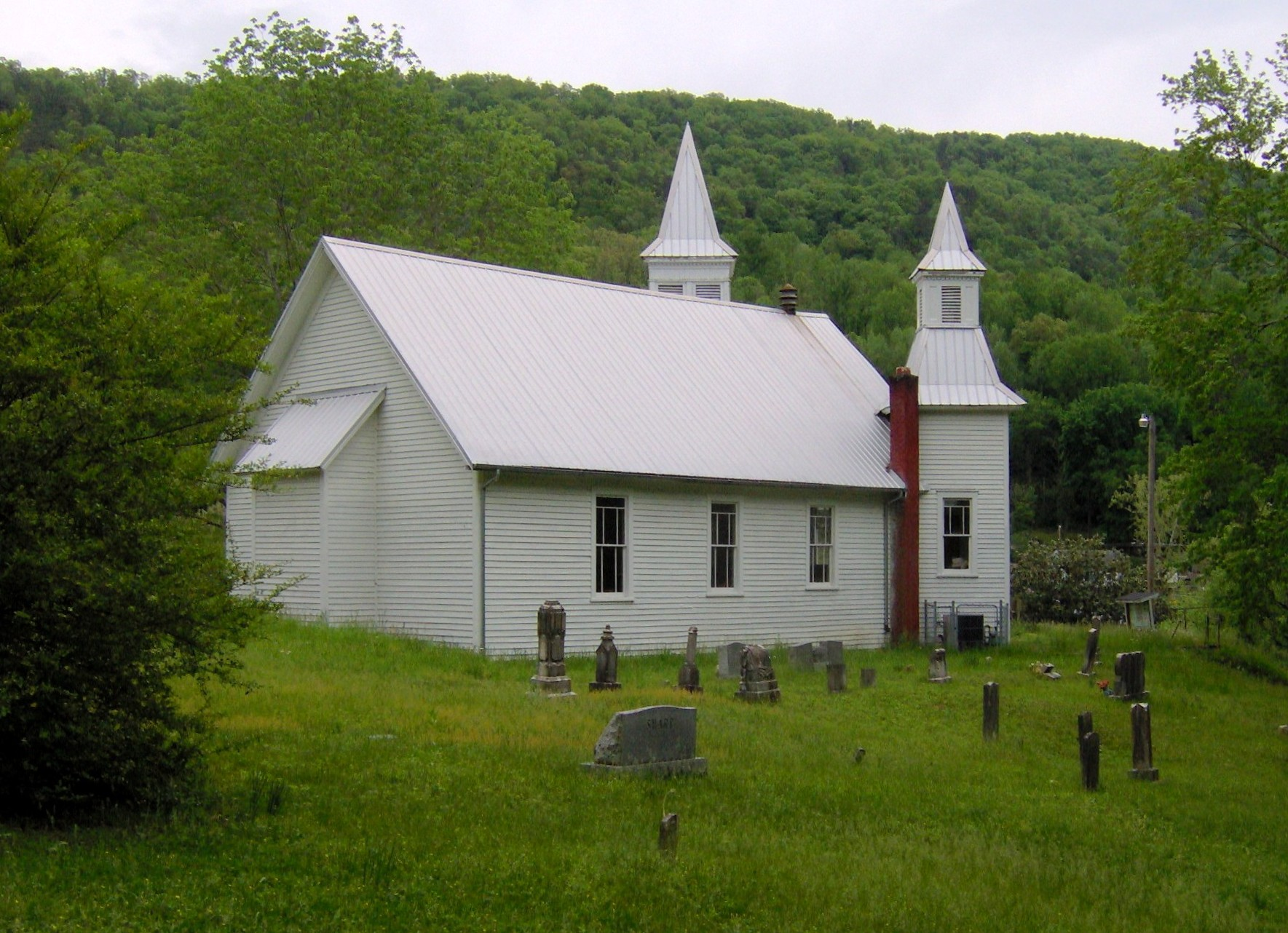
- Briceville Community Church and Cemetery

- Location within Tennessee Location within the United States
- Location: State Route 116
- Nearest city: Briceville, Tennessee
- Coordinates: 36°10′43″N 84°10′59″W
- Area: 3.2 acres (1.3 ha)
- Built: 1887
- Architectural style: Gothic Revival
- NRHP reference No.: 03000697
- Added to NRHP: July 24, 2003

The Briceville Community Church is a nondenominational church located in Briceville, Tennessee, United States. Built in 1887, the church served as a center of social life and community affairs for the Coal Creek Valley during the valley's coal mining boom period in the late-19th and early-20th centuries. In 2003, the church was added to the National Register of Historic Places for its historical role and as an example of rural Gothic Revival architecture.

Mining companies identified the coal resources of the Coal Creek Valley in the late 1860s, and by the 1880s a half-dozen mines were in operation throughout the valley. A railroad spur line was completed up the valley to Briceville in 1888, the year after the completion of the Briceville Community Church. The church was used as a temporary jail for prisoners in the aftermath of the Coal Creek War, a labor uprising that began with the seizure of a convict stockade in Briceville in 1891. In the following decade, the church hosted memorial services for the Fraterville Mine disaster of 1902 and the Cross Mountain Mine disaster of 1911, and victims of both disasters are buried in the church's cemetery. The church housed a Methodist congregation until 1995, and today is still used for various community events.

== Location ==
The Briceville Community Church is located on a hill at the southern tip of "Root Hog Ridge," a flank of Vowell Mountain, and is situated near the center of Briceville. This hill rises approximately 20 feet (6.1 m) above the surrounding terrain, allowing the church to be visible from almost anywhere in the community. The church stands at the edge of the hill, and the cemetery stretches northward from the rear corner of the church up the hillslope, with several gravestones straddling the treeline along the property's boundaries. State Highway 116 passes along the base of the hill.

The Briceville community is located at the upper end of the Coal Creek Valley, a narrow valley that slices between Walden Ridge and the rugged areas of the Cumberland Mountains.

== History ==
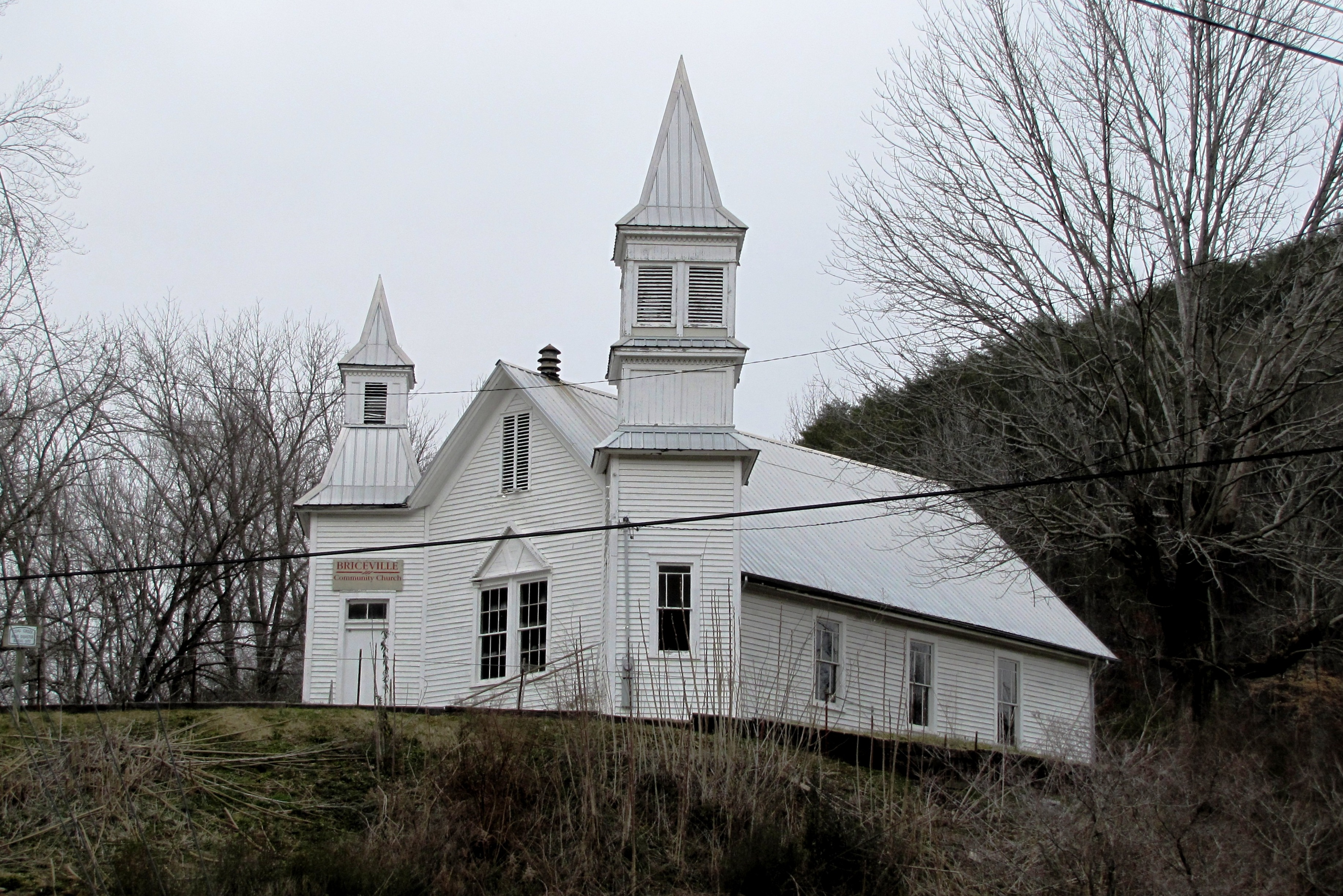
The church, viewed from TN-116

The completion of a railroad line from Knoxville to Coal Creek (modern Rocky Top) in the late 1860s brought about a mining boom in the Coal Creek Valley. In 1888, at the urging of Ohio Senator Calvin Brice, a spur line was built up the valley to Slatestone Hollow, and thus the Slatestone community was renamed "Briceville." The Briceville Community Church was built by volunteers in 1887 on land donated by John Moore. The church was initially nondenominational, but by 1896 had become a Methodist church after Briceville's Baptist and Presbyterian communities grew large enough to build their own churches.

Historian Karin Shapiro credits institutions such as churches for creating a sense of local unity that contributed to the Coal Creek War, a labor uprising that erupted in 1891 over the Tennessee Coal Mining Company's decision to use convict labor to break a strike at its Briceville mine. The conflict began on July 14 of that year, when several armed miners surrounded the company's stockade in Briceville and marched the company's convict laborers out of the valley. Briceville remained at the center of the uprising until it was finally crushed by the Tennessee state militia in August 1892. The Briceville Community Church was used as a temporary jail to hold dozens of miners arrested by the militia in the conflict's aftermath.

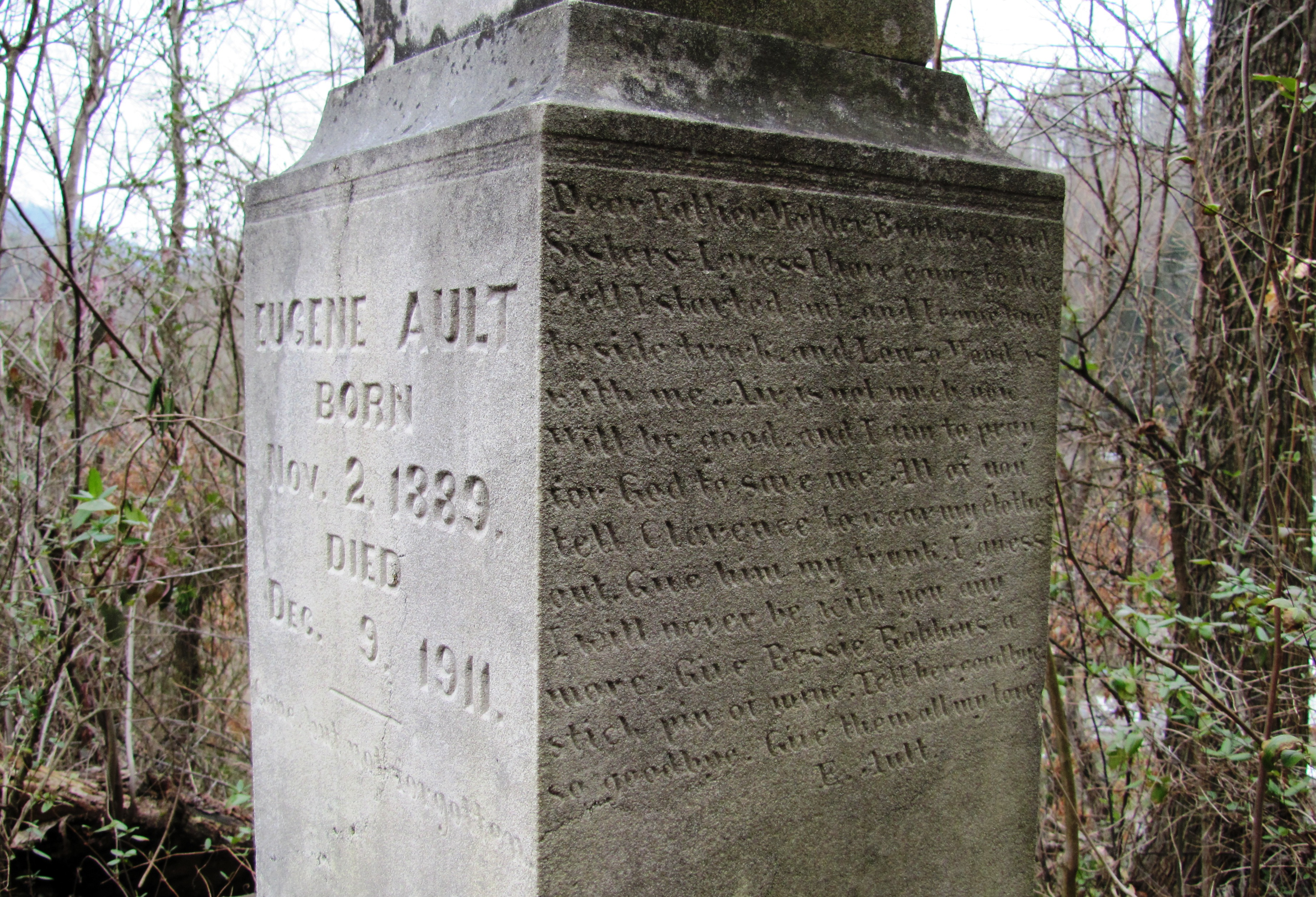
Monument of Cross Mountain Mine disaster victim Eugene Ault, which displays Ault's "farewell message"

On June 8, 1902, memorial services led by local doctor and pastor E. S. Dickson were held at the Briceville Community Church for victims of the Fraterville Mine disaster, a mine explosion that killed 216 miners at the Fraterville Mine just north of Briceville. Another mine disaster took place at the Cross Mountain Mine about a mile west of the church on December 9, 1911, killing 84 miners. Many of the victims of this explosion were buried in a circular formation known as the Cross Mountain Miners' Circle on the slopes of Walden Ridge, although several were buried in the Briceville Community Church Cemetery, among them Eugene Ault (1889–1911), whose monument is inscribed with the "farewell message" Ault had written on a wall of the mine as he lay dying.

After World War II, mining companies gradually moved out of Briceville as the nationwide demand for coal plummeted, and membership at the Briceville Community Church began to drop. Between 1947 and 1965, the church's pastor, Ralph Cline, and church member Anna Mae Evans initiated a number of programs that helped make the community more involved with the church. These included summer Bible school classes, a community Thanksgiving service, and an annual New Year's Eve service that ended with the church's bell being tolled at midnight. It was also under Cline's leadership that a fellowship hall was built in the church's basement. Regular Methodist services continued at the church until June 1995, when the Methodist Church transferred the building to two local trustees. The church is still used for community events such as weddings and funerals, and serves as an evacuation place for Briceville Elementary School (located across the street) in case of emergencies.

== Design ==
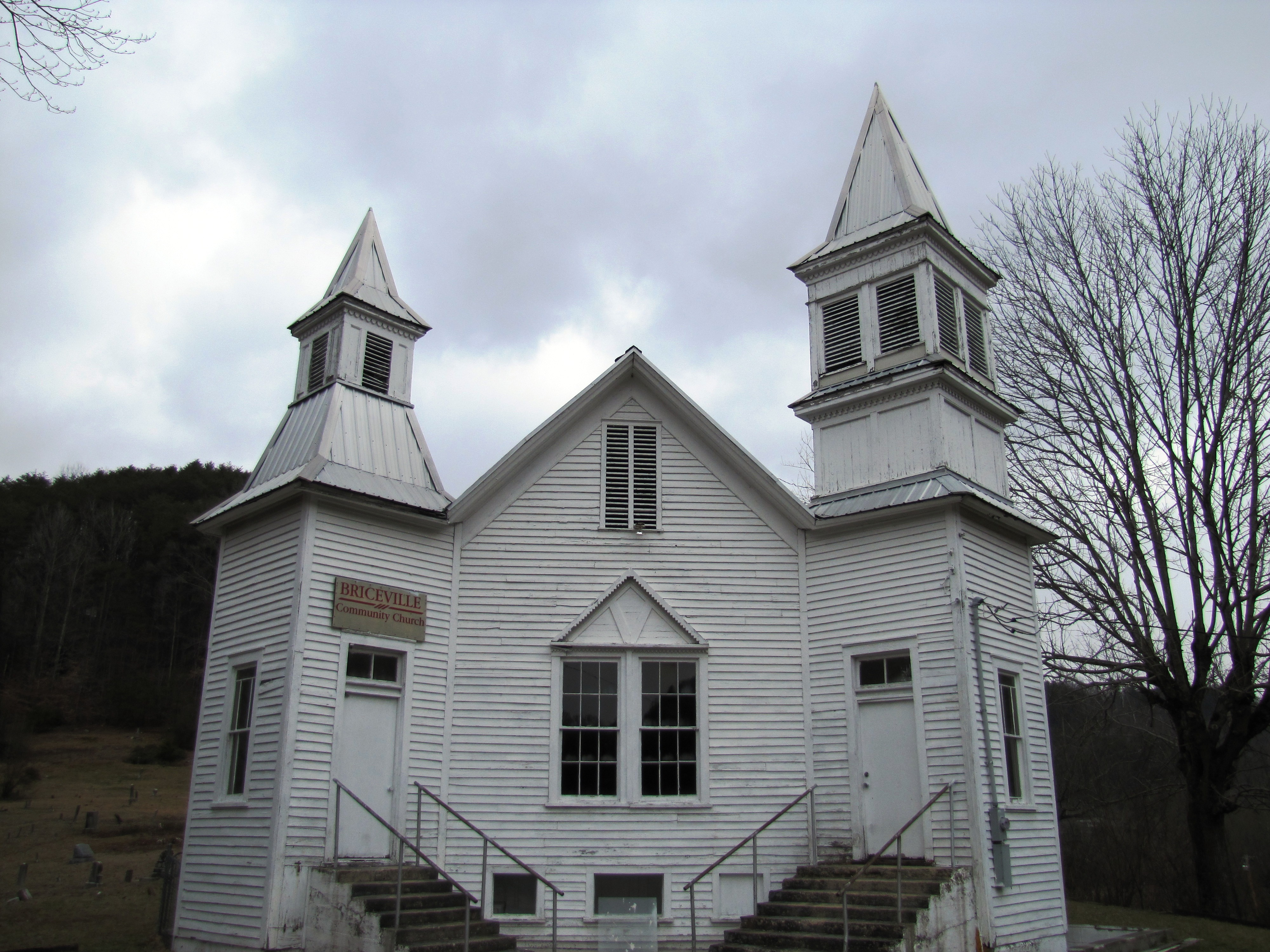
The church's facade

The Briceville Community Church has painted weatherboard walls, a basement and a gabled roof. The building would be a simple vernacular structure but for the two Gothic Revival-style towers connected at oblique angles to the corners of the facade. Although both towers have louvered belfries and pyramid roofs, the east tower is taller than the west tower, and has a slightly different design. The east tower also contains the church's bell, which was cast in 1919. A brick chimney behind the west tower was added in the 1950s.

Doors at the base of both towers provide entrances to the church's sanctuary. The sanctuary has a carpeted wooden floor and oak pews (installed in the 1950s), and has a pulpit with wooden paneling. A set of wooden stairs accesses the church's basement, which contains a fellowship hall and Sunday school classrooms built in the 1950s.

The church's cemetery, which is a contributing site in the church's National Register listing, covers just under an acre on the west and north sides of the church. The cemetery's oldest marker is that of Henry Mears, who died on March 31, 1891. Most of the markers have an east-west orientation, and are typically commercial slabs or obelisks. Symbolic carvings include Victorian-era symbols such as opened Bibles, praying hands, stars, and doves, as well as symbols for groups such as the Independent Order of Odd Fellows and the Freemasons.
