= Fraterville Mine disaster =

Coordinates: 36°11′44″N 84°10′27″W

- Fraterville Miners' Circle
- U.S. National Register of Historic Places
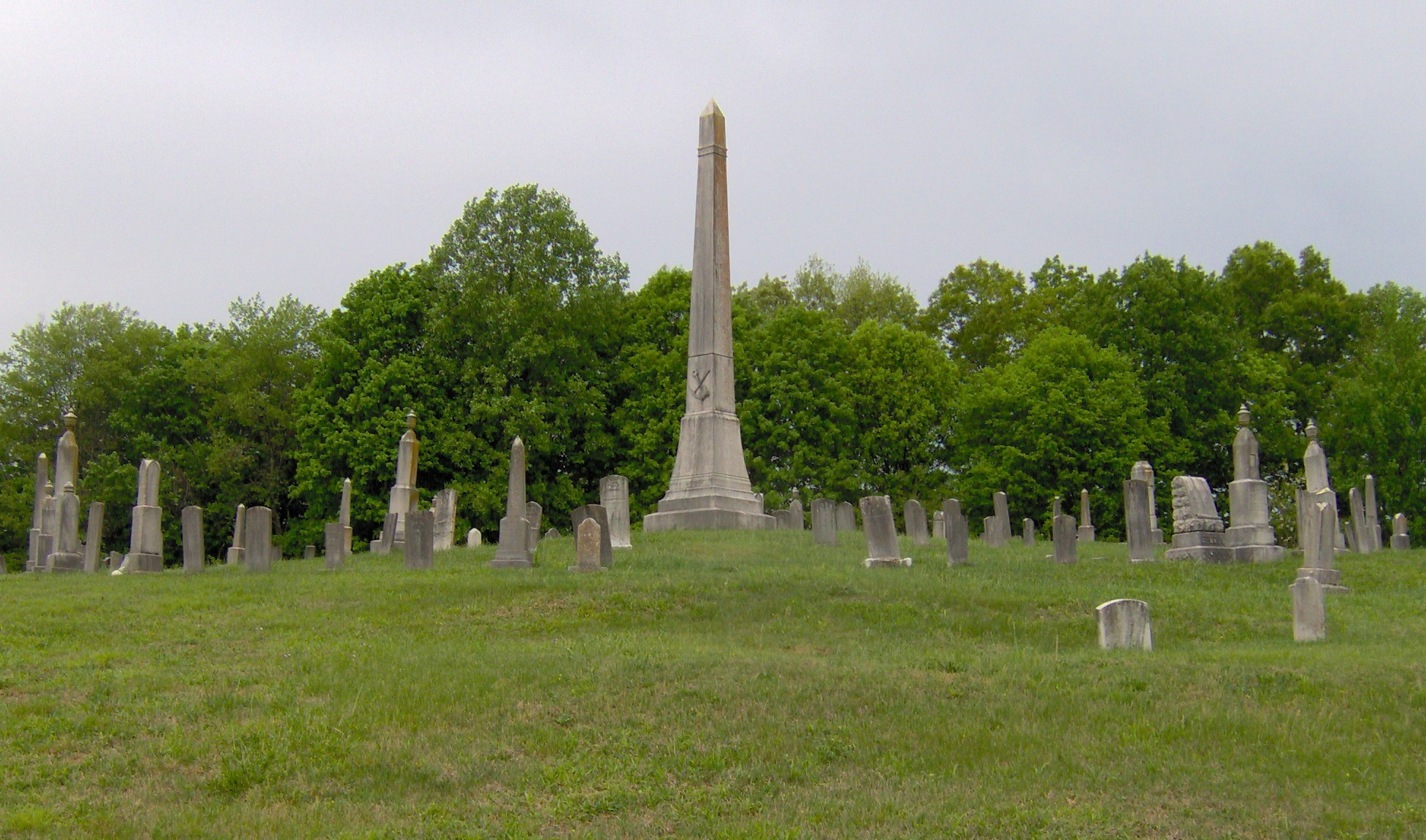
- Fraterville Miners' Circle
- Location: Leach Cemetery Lane; Rocky Top, Tennessee
- NRHP reference No.: 04001459
- Added to NRHP: January 5, 2005

The Fraterville Mine disaster was a coal mine explosion that occurred on May 19, 1902 near the community of Fraterville in the U.S. state of Tennessee. Official records state that 216 miners died as a result of the explosion, from either its initial blast or from the after-effects, making it the worst mining disaster in the United States' history, and remains the worst disaster in the history of Tennessee. However, locals claim that the true number of deaths is greater than this because many miners were unregistered and multiple bodies were not identified. The cause of the explosion (although never fully determined) was likely ignition of methane gas which had built up after leaking from an adjacent unventilated mine.

Shortly after the disaster, the bodies of 89 of the 216 miners killed in the explosion were buried in what became known as the Fraterville Miners' Circle at Leach Cemetery in the nearby town of Coal Creek (modern Rocky Top). In 2005, this circle was placed on the U.S. National Register of Historic Places.

== Location ==
The Fraterville Mine was one of several mines located in the coal-rich Cumberland Mountains of western Anderson County, Tennessee. The mine and its namesake community were situated near the heart of the Coal Creek Valley, a narrow north-south oriented valley slicing between Walden Ridge to the east and Vowell Mountain to the west. Tennessee State Route 116 connects Fraterville with Briceville to the south and Rocky Top to the north. This stretch of Route 116 has been renamed "Fraterville Miners Memorial Highway" in honor of the victims of the mine explosion.

== History of the Mine ==
The Coal Creek Coal Company, organized by Knoxville businessman E.C. Camp, began work at the Fraterville Mine in 1870. Coal Creek Coal developed a reputation for fair contracts and fair pay, and the company's Fraterville Mine was considered one of the safest in the region. The company never took part in the state's controversial convict leasing system and paid in cash (rather than scrip), and thus avoided much of the labor unrest that plagued neighboring mines during the Coal Creek War in the early 1890s.

E.C. Camp wanted to create a peaceful community of miners that maintained a brotherhood amongst itself. Thus, he decided to use the word "frater" in the name of the mine, as this word of Latin origin means "brother." The Fraterville Mine was one of the first in the world to adopt this concept and it drew in many miners. Additionally, Camp allowed his miners to use their wages on anything that they wanted, unlike other mine owners that forced miners to live in their rental housing or severely limited their lives through unfair scrip payments.

== Explosion and recovery efforts ==
According to the Tennessee Commissioner of Labor, the Fraterville Mine explosion occurred around 7:20 on the morning of May 19, 1902. The explosion shot black smoke and debris out the mine's mouth and ventilation shaft. In fact, signs of the explosion were first seen by a group of men working at a nearby mine called the Thistle Mine. These men reportedly saw black smoke rising from the Fraterville Mine and initially thought that it was coming from a ventilation furnace. But once the mine's superintendent George Camp (E.C. Camp's son) arrived at the entrance of the mine, he discovered that the mine had collapsed and the smoke was certainly not just from a furnace. Immediately, many men who were not working at the time of the explosion began trying to rescue the trapped miners while organized rescue efforts were quickly being put together by George Camp and a Welsh mine operator from nearby Jellico named Philip Francis.

It soon became clear that the rescuers had to attempt to fix the mine's ventilation and get clean air back into the mine. George Camp led a small "scout" team into the entrance of the mine to see how far down they could get and ran into blockage about 2,000 feet in. Following George Camp's scouting of the situation attempt, he and his small team found thousands of people, many of whom were wives and family members of the miners, desperately trying to break into the mine from multiple locations.

Safely performing rescue missions proved to be difficult because, prior to the explosion, coal surrounding support beams within the mine's shafts had been removed and the explosion caused many of these shafts to be extremely unstable. Thus, some of the shafts collapsed and rescuers had to dig through them and others were too dangerous to travel through. George Camp requested for Philip Francis to obtain a team of experienced miners to help with the rescue missions. At a later point in time, Francis stated that he remembered arriving to the mine and seeing a great deal of confusion as families of the miners began gathering outside the mine in panic and sadness and unorganized rescue operations were taking place. He remembered the need to both correct the errors within the ongoing rescue missions and dissolve the situation with the families. In fact, one miner who was not on shift at the time of the explosion had to be removed from the rescue missions by force because he had worked for nearly 36 hours straight attempting to remove bodies and potentially save people.

The initial rescue party penetrated to just 200 feet (61 m), however, before they were forced to turn back and await the dispersal of toxic gases. Once Philip Francis and his team arrives, they organized a second rescue party that entered the mine at 4:00 that afternoon, and using a makeshift venting system made of cloth and creosote, they inched their way into the main shaft, where they observed the destruction, later reported by the Commissioner:

Brattices had been destroyed, and along the main entry the force of the explosion was terrific, timbers and cogs placed to hold a squeeze were blown out, mine cars, wheels, and doors were shattered, and bodies were dismembered.

The creosote and cloth ventilation shafts worked by dissipating the toxic gases within the mine and allowed the rescuers to enter the mine on the same day of the explosion, unlike in other mine explosion cases where rescuers were not able to begin their missions for several days. The day after the explosion, the air was much more breathable and rescue efforts went into full swing. Once the rescuers made it past the explosion site, they found the rest of the mine to still be quite stable. It appeared like all of the miners further down the mine died due to suffocation and not due to complications from the blast or debris. In fact, the rescue team discovered that 26 miners had barricaded themselves in a side passage of the mine and effectively kept most of the toxic gases away from themselves. But, the longest any of these miners survived was seven hours and they too died from suffocation. Several miners wrote farewell messages to loved ones shortly before dying, stating they were struggling for air, and encouraging their families to "live right" so they would meet again in heaven. The last body was removed from the mine four days after the explosion.

== Letters to Loved Ones ==
Some of the men within the group of 26 that barricaded themselves within a side passage of the mine wrote final letters to their families. Most of these messages were created on paper or pieces of slate, but a few were written directly on the mine's walls. A couple of these letters were not discovered for some time, as the miners had placed the papers inside their pockets and the messages were not found until their pockets were checked. Additionally, the contents of some of the letters have not become public information for privacy reasons or because they were lost.

One miner named Jacob Vowell wrote to his wife, "It is 25 minutes after two. There is a few of us alive yet. Oh God, for one more breath. Ellen remember me as long as you live. Good Bye Darling." Vowell's 14-year-old son Harvey was also trapped within the mine beside him. They requested to be buried together and Harvey asked for his brother Horace to take all of his shoes and clothing and wear them.

Another miner named Frank Sharp wrote to his wife on a piece of slate because he did not have any paper. He stated, "Dear Mabel, I am dying for air. I will soon be gone. Meet me in heaven. Help Jesus. Take care of the children and do the best you can. Meet me in heaven."

Powell Harmon wrote an extensive note to his family. One part of his message included, "I hope to meet you all in heaven. My boys, never work in the coal mines."

George Hutson wrote to his wife, "If I don't see you no more bury me in the clothing I have. I want you to meet me in heaven. Goodbye. Do as you wish."

James Brooks wrote a very brief note addressed to both his wife and child which read, "My dear wife and baby: I want you to go back home and take the baby, so good bye. I am going to heaven. I want you to meet me there."

John Hendren's letter was eventually written out word for word on his headstone. It read:

"Dear Darling Mother, Father, brothers and sisters...I have gone to heaven. I want all of you to meet me in heaven, and tell all of your friends to meet me there, and tell the church that I am gone to heaven.

Oh dear friends don't grieve over me for I am in sight of heaven. Oh dear Sarah stay at fathers or at your fathers and pay all I owe if possible. Bury me at Pleasant Hill if it suits you all, if not bury me where it suits you all. Bury me in black. This is about 1:30 o'clock. So good bye dear loving father, mother, brothers, and friends. I have not suffered much yet. So good bye everybody.

Your boy, your brother, your friend.

John Hendren"

== Aftermath ==
Recovery missions lasted for many days as a line of families and miners waited outside the entrance of the Fraterville Mine in order to identify each body that was extracted. After the first day, most people lost hope of their loved one being alive, but they still wanted to be able to identify bodies. Additionally, it was unknown exactly how many men were in the mine. So, recovery expeditions continued for a long time in an attempt to ensure all of the dead miners were found

The cause of the explosion was a matter of controversy. The report issued by the Tennessee Commissioner of Labor stated that the explosion occurred when volatile gases that "had accumulated because of inadequate ventilation" were ignited by an open light. While the report stated that the shutdown of the mine's ventilation system over the previous weekend had allowed the dangerous build-up of the gases, ventilation furnace operator Tip Hightower was acquitted of negligence at a subsequent inquest. The report also suggested that gases had leaked into the Fraterville Mine from an adjacent abandoned (and unventilated) mine once operated by the Knoxville Iron Company. Along with Hightower, superintendent George Camp was also charged with negligence, but was acquitted after several hours of tearful testimony.

The community of Fraterville was devastated by the mine explosion. The town lost all but three of its adult men. Hundreds of women were widowed, and roughly a thousand children were left fatherless. Some families lost as many as eight family members. The youngest person to die in the event was 12 years old. A large memorial service was conducted at the Briceville Community Church on June 8, 1902.

Eighty-nine of the deceased miners are buried in the Fraterville Miners' Circle in Leach Cemetery (behind Clear Branch Baptist Church) just off U.S. 25W at Rocky Top. A monument at the center of the circle bears the names of all 184 miners who were identified. On May 19, 2005, the circle was added to the National Register of Historic Places. Other miners who lost their lives in the Fraterville disaster are buried in Longfield Cemetery on U.S. Route 441 just east of Rocky Top.

== See also ==
- Cross Mountain Mine disaster
