= Knights of Reciprocity =

American secret political order (est. 1890)

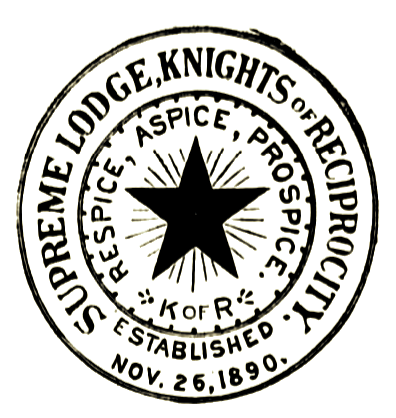
Emblem (1891)

Knights of Reciprocity (acronym, KofR; est. 1890) was an American semi-political secret society. Largely inspired by opposition to the Farmers' Alliance, it was organized in Garden City, Kansas, on November 26, 1890, by members of the Masonic Fraternity, Odd Fellows, and Knights of Pythias. The KofR was organized for the express purpose of aiding James G. Blaine to the Republican presidential nomination, and grew so rapidly that when the 1892 Republican National Convention was held in Minneapolis, the order had a membership in Missouri alone of over 20,000. With the defeat of Blaine, interest in the order lagged for a time, but after William Warner's nomination, the enthusiasm flamed up again.

== History ==
"The Knights of Reciprocity appear to be an organization to which the Western Republican can belong and avoid the horrible stigma of being an Eastern Mugwump. All Mugwumps favor limited free trade, reciprocity is limited free trade, but no Mugwump can be a Knight of Reciprocity. This is one more illustration of the expansive capacity of an extensive nomenclature." (Journal, Providence, Indiana, June 13, 1891)

The KofR was more or less a direct outgrowth of the Kansas elections of 1890. The Farmers' Alliance of that year promulgated platforms including sub-treasury schemes, absolute free trade, government loans, and several other socialistic projects. The Knights of Reciprocity, finding, perhaps, that a golden mean between the extreme Alliance men and the extreme party men would be the best, organized a society mainly for political education, but providing also for social and recreative entertainments.

During the winter of 1890, this secret political order was organized in Garden City, Kansas, by the Hon. Jesse Taylor, Hon. D. M. Frost, of that city, S. R. Peters, and other Republicans. It early attracted attention throughout Kansas, in Missouri, and in many other States. It sought to secure the perpetuity of the Union, just and liberal pensions to honorably discharged soldiers and sailors of the Republic, protection of American industries, fair and equitable reciprocity between all the nations on the American continent, an intelligent ballot honestly cast and counted, and favored the disfranchising of every citizen who offers or accepts a bribe to influence a ballot.—

Within the first year, 500 KofR lodges had been established in the west, and applications were being received daily at the KofR headquarters for the institution of new lodges from every State and territory.

The organization's object was declared to be to teach the duties of citizenship, to discuss and study political history and economic questions that voters may cast intelligent ballots. The inspiration of the Knights of Reciprocity was a desire to counteract the influence in rural communities of what was regarded as a "Democratic Union Labor-Farmers' Alliance" combination in politics.

The Supreme Lodge of the Knights of Reciprocity stated in one of its circulars, published in 1891:—

"The only way for the farmers to meet the Alliance secret political society is with a secret society the object of which shall not be to nominate men for office, but to assist in educating the people and making them thoroughly acquainted with the wants of all the people and the fallacies of the alliance "calamity" howlers, who are traveling from State to State, county to county, town to town, township to township, schoolhouse to schoolhouse, not for the good of the people, but for the money they make and in hopes of political promotion. The people should organize at once in opposition to the gigantic scheme."

It was doubtful whether the KofR ever equaled the Farmers' Alliance in membership. The former claimed 126,000 members in 1895, in the Midwest and South, and did not exceeded that total. Its lodges spread from Kansas to Missouri, Iowa, Ohio, Arkansas, Louisiana, Mississippi, Tennessee, North Carolina, and South Carolina, in all of which States, the Farmers' Alliance was also strong.

== Organization ==
The organization was simple. There is a Supreme Lodge composed of two delegates from each State lodge. Its headquarters were originally in Garden City, Kansas, but were transferred to Washington, D.C. The state lodge was composed of representatives from subordinary lodges, and met twice a year.

There was a beneficiary branch of the order, membership in which was not restricted as to sex.

== Membership ==
Founders of the KofR were members of the Masonic Fraternity, the Odd Fellows, and Knights of Pythias.

For the convenience of organizing and extending the order a short political catechism was formulated, and each candidate for membership was required to answer the following questions:

1. Are you in favor of the perpetuity of our Union?
2. Are you in favor of just and liberal pensions to all honorably discharged soldiers and sailors of the republic?
3. Are you in favor of the protection of American industries?
4. Are you in favor of fair and equitable reciprocity between all nations on the American continent?
5. Are you in favor of fair and equitable reciprocity between all interests in our nation?
6. Are you in favor of an intelligent ballot, honestly cast and counted?

In Tennessee, where the convict labor issue was an unsolved problem for some time, one more question was added: Are you in favor of disfranchising every citizen who offers or accepts a bribe to influence a ballot?

== Ritual, grips, and passwords ==
The ritual was based on the Golden Rule, as might be supposed, and taught equality, fair dealing, and the desirability of reciprocal trade relations both in the U.S. and abroad.

Place your right hand to your forehead with the your two front fingers extended horizontally above the bridge of your nose. Then draw them down as if wiping the face, stopping at the chin with the thumb beneath and the two fingers clasped about the chin. If you do that, you will be giving the correct KofR signal of recognition. Any knight that comes within gun shot of you while you are going through this performance will reply by raising the opened right band to the forehead and resting it above the eyes as if they were shading them from the light. That will show that he is in the KofR, and if you can master the grip successfully, he will break a piece of limburger with you. Clap your hands three times above your head and say "Save the People" when in distress.

The grip was not complicated. It was given by clasping the right hands, and in the act of shaking, each brother turned his wrist to the left, making a complete lock.

Passwords included "America" (semi-annual) and "America-Washington" (annual).
