= Coal Creek (Clinch River tributary) =

Location
- Country: United States
- State: Tennessee
- Region: Anderson County

Physical characteristics
- Source: Cross Mountain
  - coordinates: 36°9′38″N 84°14′23″W
- Mouth: Clinch River
  - coordinates: 36°12′23″N 84°7′20″W

Coal Creek is a tributary of the Clinch River in Tennessee. The stream is approximately 10.3 miles (16.6 km) long.

Coal Creek flows northward along the southeastern base of Cross Mountain, slicing a narrow valley in which the communities of Briceville and Fraterville are located, to Rocky Top at the eastern base of the Cumberland Plateau. The creek's confluence with the Clinch River is east of Rocky Top and below Norris Dam, near the Interstate 75 highway bridge across the river.

The drainage basin is about 36 square miles (93 km^{2}). Beech Grove Fork is its largest tributary stream. Coal Creek's water quality is affected by coal surface mining, municipal wastewater discharges, and channelization.

== See also ==
- Coal Creek War
- List of rivers of Tennessee
