= Briceville, Tennessee =

Briceville
- Unincorporated community
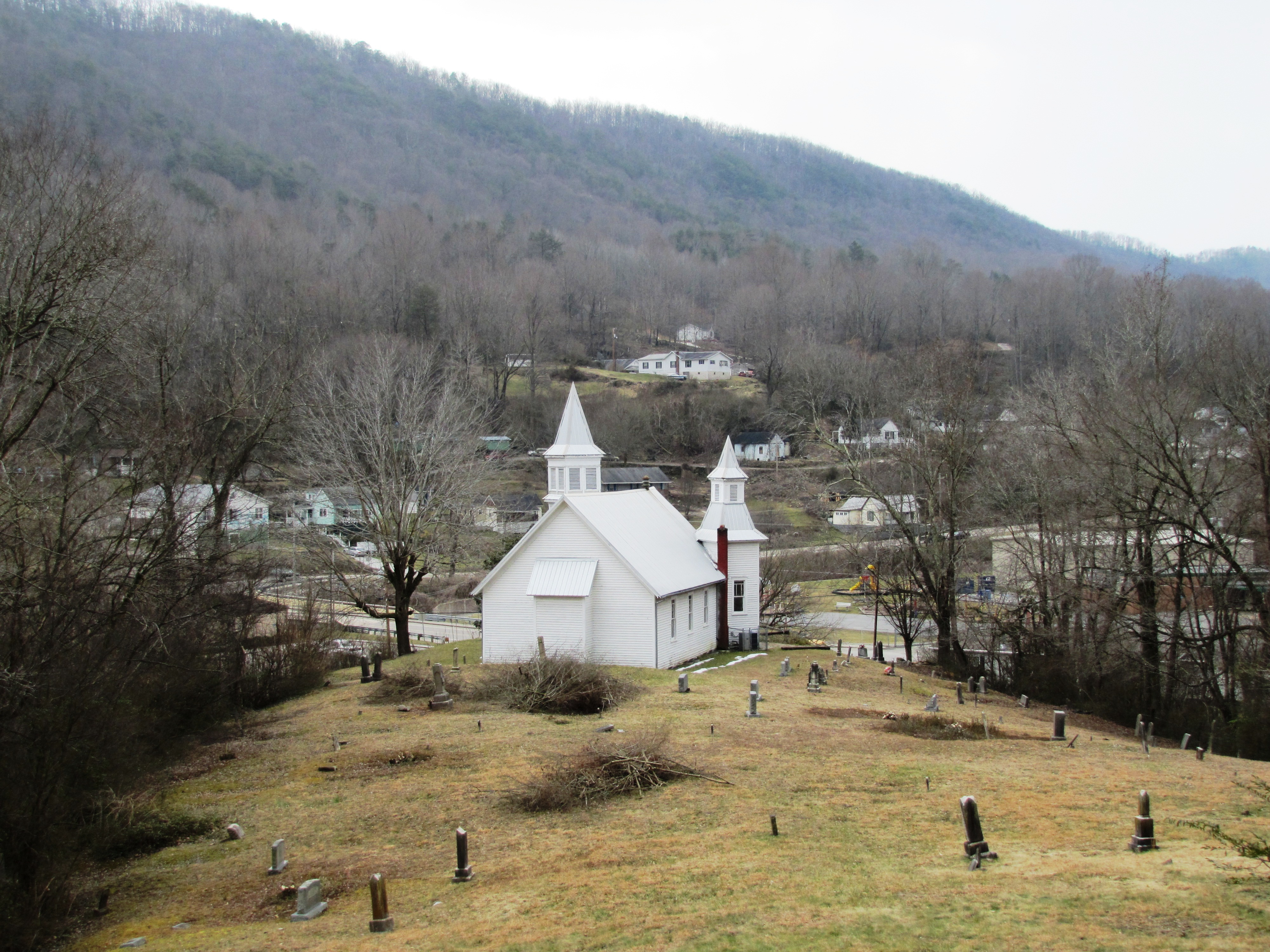
- View from the Briceville Community Church Cemetery
- Interactive map of Briceville
- Coordinates: 36°10′42″N 84°11′07″W
- Country: United States
- State: Tennessee
- County: Anderson

Area
  - Total: 0.48 sq mi (1.25 km^{2})
  - Land: 0.48 sq mi (1.25 km^{2})
  - Water: 0 sq mi (0.00 km^{2})
- Elevation: 909 ft (277 m)

Population (2020)
  - Total: 334
  - Density: 692.1/sq mi (267.21/km^{2})
- Time zone: UTC-5 (Eastern (EST))
  - Summer (DST): UTC-4 (CDT)
- ZIP code: 37710
- Area code: 865
- FIPS code: 47-08400
- GNIS feature ID: 1278326

Briceville is an unincorporated community in Anderson County, Tennessee. It is included in the Knoxville, Tennessee Metropolitan Statistical Area. The community is named for railroad tycoon and one-term Democratic U.S. Senator Calvin S. Brice of Ohio, who was instrumental in bringing railroad service to the town.

The Briceville zip code, 37710, which also includes a large remote mountain area west of the community formerly served by the now-closed Devonia post office, had a population of 1,441 as of the 2000 U.S. Census.

Briceville's economy was historically based on coal mining. Briceville played an important role in three major late-19th and early-20th century incidents related to the region's coal mining activities: the Coal Creek War in 1891, the Fraterville Mine disaster of 1902, and the Cross Mountain Mine disaster of 1911.

Historical population
Census	Pop.	Note	%±
2020	334		—
U.S. Decennial Census

== History ==
The Knoxville Iron Company, cofounded by Welsh immigrants in 1868, began mining coal in the Coal Creek Valley in the late 1860s, initially hauling the coal from the mines via wagon, and later by railroad after the completion of a Knoxville and Kentucky Railroad line between Knoxville and Coal Creek (now Rocky Top) in 1869. In subsequent years, Knoxville Iron and other companies gradually worked their way up the Coal Creek Valley, opening mines in The Wye, Fraterville, and Slatestone Hollow. In 1888, at Senator Calvin Brice's behest, a railroad spur was built connecting Coal Creek with Slatestone Hollow. After this line's completion, the Slatestone Hollow community was renamed "Briceville."

Briceville and the Coal Creek Valley grew rapidly in the 1890s as the demand for coal soared. By 1900, the valley had over 4,000 residents, and by 1910 Briceville was the largest community in Anderson County. Briceville's most prominent structure, the Briceville Community Church, was built by volunteers in 1887 on a hill near the center of the community. The church was initially non-denominational, but as the community's population grew, Baptists and Presbyterians built their own churches, and in 1896 the Briceville Community Church became a Methodist church.

=== Coal Creek War ===
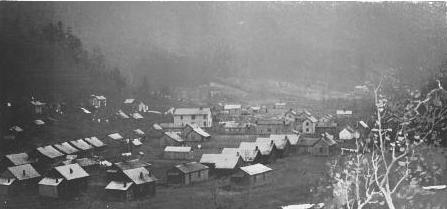
Briceville in 1891, at the start of the Coal Creek War

In the early 1890s, Briceville played a central role in the Coal Creek War, a labor uprising that grew out of local coal miners' opposition to the state's practice of leasing prisoners to businesses, which reduced the need for conventional labor. Three of the conflict's chief instigators— Eugene Merrell, George Irish, and S. D. Moore— lived in Briceville. Merrell, a French-born Knights of Labor activist, had been chased out of mining towns in Indiana before settling in Briceville, where he was blacklisted for Union activities in 1889, and made his living operating a mercantile store. Irish, who also operated one of the community's mercantile stores, had lived in the area since 1880. Moore was a local Baptist preacher and farmer.

In the spring of 1891, miners at the Tennessee Coal Mining Company (TCMC) mine in Briceville went on strike after the company demanded they sign an iron-clad contract. To break the strike, TCMC leased several dozen convicts from the state, built a stockade in Briceville to house them, and reopened its mine on July 5, 1891. On July 14, 300 armed miners attacked the stockade and marched the convicts out of the valley. This action prompted Governor John P. Buchanan to lead the state militia into the valley to restore order. On July 16, Buchanan met with the Briceville miners at Thistle Switch (just north of Briceville), where he made a plea for calm, but was shouted down by Merrell, who demanded the governor enforce the state's laws against iron-clad contracts.

The miners seized the TCMC stockade again on July 20, prompting Buchanan to request a 60-day truce while he summoned the legislature to discuss the issue. The legislature rejected the miners' demands, however, and on October 31, the miners burned the Briceville stockade and freed all of its convicts. The conflict, which eventually spread across the state's entire Cumberland Plateau region, dragged on for several months before the militia launched a crackdown in August 1892, arresting hundreds of miners. Merrell fled the state, and Irish and Moore were arrested. While the uprising was crushed, it induced the state to end the convict lease system.

=== Fraterville Mine disaster ===
In 1902, an explosion occurred at a mine in Fraterville— which lies almost adjacent to Briceville to the northeast— killing 216 miners, including several Briceville residents. A large memorial service for the Fraterville deceased was held at the Briceville church on June 8, 1902. At least one victim of the explosion is buried in the church's cemetery.

=== Cross Mountain Mine disaster ===
On December 9, 1911, an explosion occurred at the Cross Mountain Mine, which lay at the end of Slatestone Hollow in the extreme west of Briceville. The explosion killed or trapped 89 miners who had entered the mine that morning, although five were eventually freed by an intensive rescue effort initiated by the Bureau of Mines. Several miners killed in this explosion were buried in a circular formation known as the Cross Mountain Miners' Circle, located in Circle Cemetery just off Highway 116 near the Laurel Branch Baptist Church. Others were buried in the Briceville Community Church's cemetery.

=== Post office ===
The Briceville post office was established in 1888. As of 2011, it served a population of about 1,400 in Briceville and northwestern Anderson County, with 332 post office boxes in the post office and one rural postal carrier route extending from Fraterville to the New River community. In July 2011 the U.S. Postal Service identified it as one of 3,653 retail post offices proposed for closure. Though as of December 2018, it is still open and operational.
