= Rocky Top, Tennessee =

City in Anderson and Campbell Counties, Tennessee, US

Rocky Top (formerly Coal Creek and Lake City)
- City
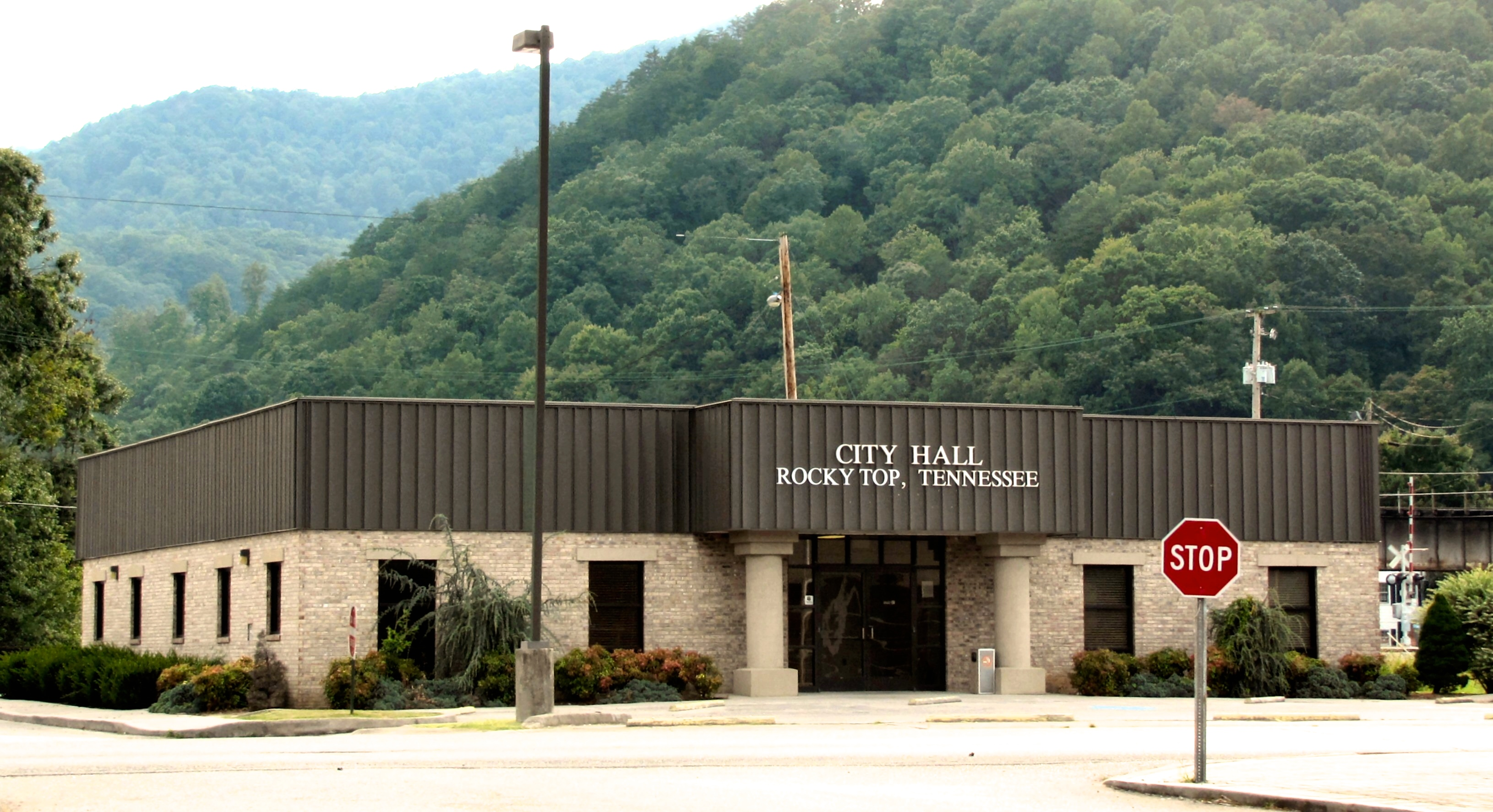
- Rocky Top City Hall

- Location of Rocky Top in Anderson and Campbell counties, Tennessee.
- Coordinates: 36°13′27″N 84°9′21″W
- Country: United States
- State: Tennessee
- Counties: Anderson, Campbell
- Founded: 1856
- Incorporated: 1939
- Named for: "Rocky Top"

Government
  - Type: council-manager
  - Mayor: Kerry Templin
  - City Manager: Michael Ellis
  - City Council: List of Councilmen: Mack Bunch(also Vice Mayor); Jeff Gilliam; Stacy Phillips; Zack Green

Area
  - Total: 1.62 sq mi (4.19 km^{2})
  - Land: 1.62 sq mi (4.19 km^{2})
  - Water: 0 sq mi (0.00 km^{2})
- Elevation: 869 ft (265 m)

Population (2020)
  - Total: 1,628
  - Density: 1,005.5/sq mi (388.22/km^{2})
- Time zone: UTC-5 (Eastern (EST))
  - Summer (DST): UTC-4 (EDT)
- ZIP code: 37769
- Area code: 865
- FIPS code: 47-40240
- GNIS feature ID: 1290479
- Website: rockytoptn.org

Rocky Top (formerly Coal Creek and Lake City) is a city in Anderson and Campbell counties in the eastern part of the U.S. state of Tennessee, northwest of Knoxville. The population was 1,628 at the 2020 US Census. Most of the community is in Anderson County and is included in the Knoxville Metropolitan Statistical Area. On June 26, 2014, the city officially changed its name from Lake City to Rocky Top, after a last-ditch effort by the copyright owners of the song "Rocky Top" was denied by a federal court.

== History ==
=== Founding and Coal Creek era ===
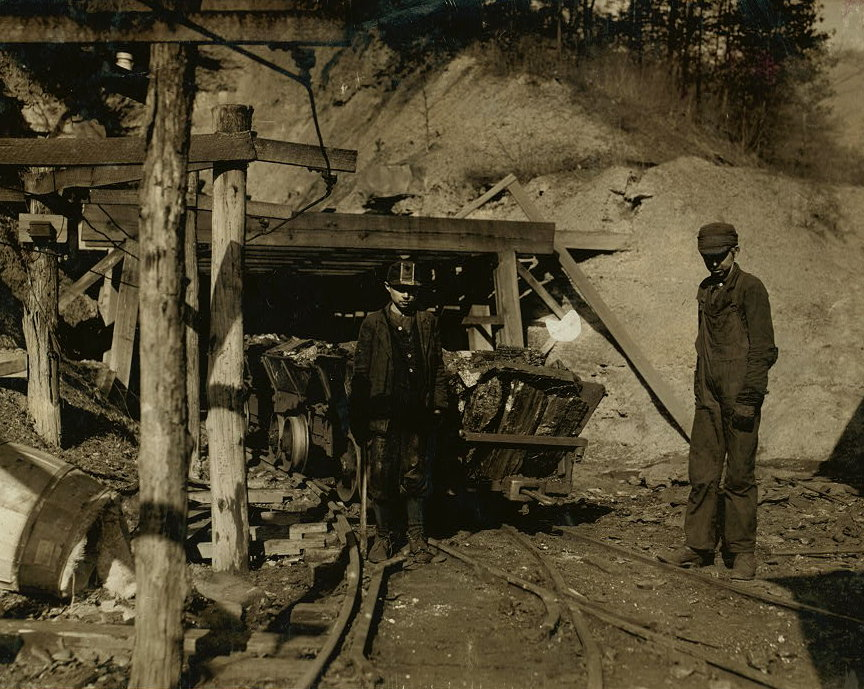
Child coal miners at Cross Mountain Mine near Coal Creek, 1910. Photo by Lewis Hine.

The town was originally named Coal Creek when it was founded in the early 19th century, after the 1798 Treaty of Tellico opened the area to settlement, taking its name from the stream that runs through the town. Coal Creek and the nearby town of Briceville were the sites of a major lockout of coal miners in 1891, which resulted in the town of Coal Creek being occupied by the state militia for over a year after miners attempted to force an end to the use of unpaid convict labor in the mines. This labor struggle, known as the Coal Creek War, was eventually resolved in the coal miners' favor with the abolition of Tennessee's convict labor program. The Fraterville Mine disaster of 1902 occurred nearby, in the village of Fraterville.

=== Lake City era ===
The town adopted the name "Lake City" in 1936 after the Tennessee Valley Authority's completion of nearby Norris Dam formed an artificial lake, Norris Lake. Some area residents, including the nonprofit Coal Creek Watershed Foundation, urged a return to the old name of "Coal Creek" to commemorate the community's heritage.

=== Rocky Top era to present day ===
In 2013, a business group proposed to construct and operate a water park in the city if its name was changed to "Rocky Top" to take advantage of the song of the same name. On November 7, 2013, Lake City's city council voted to ask the Tennessee General Assembly to amend the city charter to adopt the proposed name. The House of Bryant, which owned the copyright to the song, as well as multiple trademarks and copyrights associated with it due to its status as the main University of Tennessee fight song, objected to the name change, asserting that it would violate intellectual property rights. On May 29, U.S. District Judge Thomas A. Varlan denied the House of Bryant's request for a preliminary injunction, holding that renaming the town was not likely to be deemed to be a use in commerce as required for trademark infringement.

On June 26, 2014, the name change was official after District Judge Varlan denied a last-minute attempt by House of Bryant to prevent the vote. House of Bryant appealed to the Sixth Circuit Court of Appeals.

As of 2018, the plans for the $100 million water park remain in development as the company in charge of the project was waiting for approval of the land usage by the state government. Since 2014, the City of Rocky Top has seen minimal growth, with several retail and restaurants opening near the I-75 exit in the city's limits.

The original Rocky Top in Tennessee is a peak on the border of North Carolina in the Great Smoky Mountains National Park, at 35.5642 degrees north latitude, 83.7138 degrees west longitude. It is 14 mi (23 km) from Gatlinburg, Tennessee, where the song "Rocky Top" was written in Room 388 of The Gatlinburg Inn in 1967 by Boudleaux and Felice Bryant, but there is no record that the couple were aware of the peak when they wrote the song.

== Geography ==
The vast majority of Rocky Top is located in northern Anderson County with a small portion in Campbell County. The city is the northern terminus of U.S. Route 441. Interstate 75 serves the city with two exits and leads south 24 miles (39 km) to Knoxville and north 145 miles (233 km) to Lexington, Kentucky. U.S. Route 25W also travels through the city.

According to the United States Census Bureau, Rocky Top has a total area of 1.6 square miles (4.1 km^{2}), all land.

== Demographics ==
Historical population
Census	Pop.	Note	%±
1880	800		—
1890	1,865		133.1%
1910	1,102		—
1920	1,204		9.3%
1930	1,116		−7.3%
1940	1,520		36.2%
1950	1,827		20.2%
1960	1,914		4.8%
1970	1,923		0.5%
1980	2,335		21.4%
1990	2,166		−7.2%
2000	1,888		−12.8%
2010	1,781		−5.7%
2020	1,628		−8.6%

=== 2020 census ===
As of the 2020 census, Rocky Top had a population of 1,628. The median age was 39.3 years. 24.5% of residents were under the age of 18 and 16.7% of residents were 65 years of age or older. For every 100 females there were 92.0 males, and for every 100 females age 18 and over there were 85.9 males age 18 and over.

0.0% of residents lived in urban areas, while 100.0% lived in rural areas.

There were 703 households in Rocky Top, of which 31.4% had children under the age of 18 living in them. Of all households, 29.4% were married-couple households, 22.8% were households with a male householder and no spouse or partner present, and 36.4% were households with a female householder and no spouse or partner present. About 33.7% of all households were made up of individuals and 14.5% had someone living alone who was 65 years of age or older.

There were 811 housing units, of which 13.3% were vacant. The homeowner vacancy rate was 4.3% and the rental vacancy rate was 5.4%.

Racial composition as of the 2020 census
Race	Number	Percent
White	1,481	91.0%
Black or African American	12	0.7%
American Indian and Alaska Native	8	0.5%
Asian	6	0.4%
Native Hawaiian and Other Pacific Islander	0	0.0%
Some other race	8	0.5%
Two or more races	113	6.9%
Hispanic or Latino (of any race)	24	1.5%

=== 2000 census ===
As of the 2000 census, there were 1,888 people, 815 households, and 485 families residing in the town. The population density was 1,186.1 inhabitants per square mile (458.0/km^{2}). There were 900 housing units at an average density of 565.4 units per square mile (218.3 units/km^{2}). The racial makeup of the town was 98.78% White, 0.11% African American, 0.48% Native American, 0.16% Asian, 0.26% from other races, and 0.21% from two or more races. Hispanic or Latino of any race were 0.42% of the population.

There were 815 households, out of which 27.9% had children under the age of 18 living with them, 38.7% were married couples living together, 16.9% had a female householder with no husband present, and 40.4% were non-families. 37.3% of all households were made up of individuals, and 19.5% had someone living alone who was 65 years of age or older. The average household size was 2.17 and the average family size was 2.84.

In the town, the population was spread out, with 21.9% under the age of 18, 5.9% from 18 to 24, 24.8% from 25 to 44, 23.8% from 45 to 64, and 23.5% who were 65 years of age or older. The median age was 43 years. For every 100 females, there were 78.4 males. For every 100 females age 18 and over, there were 71.3 males.

The median income for a household in the town was $14,844, and the median income for a family was $21,895. Males had a median income of $25,469 versus $17,115 for females. The per capita income for the town was $10,615. About 31.8% of families and 32.0% of the population were below the poverty line, including 31.7% of those under age 18 and 23.7% of those age 65 or over.

== Parks and recreation ==
Norris Dam State Park is located near Rocky Top.

== Notable people ==
Rocky Top is the hometown of songwriter Dean Dillon, whose songs have become hits for singers including George Strait, Toby Keith, Keith Whitley, George Jones, and Kenny Chesney. Rocky Top (then Coal Creek) was also the birthplace of early 20th century artist Catherine Wiley (1879–1958).
