= Cumberland Mountains =

Mountain range in the southeastern United States

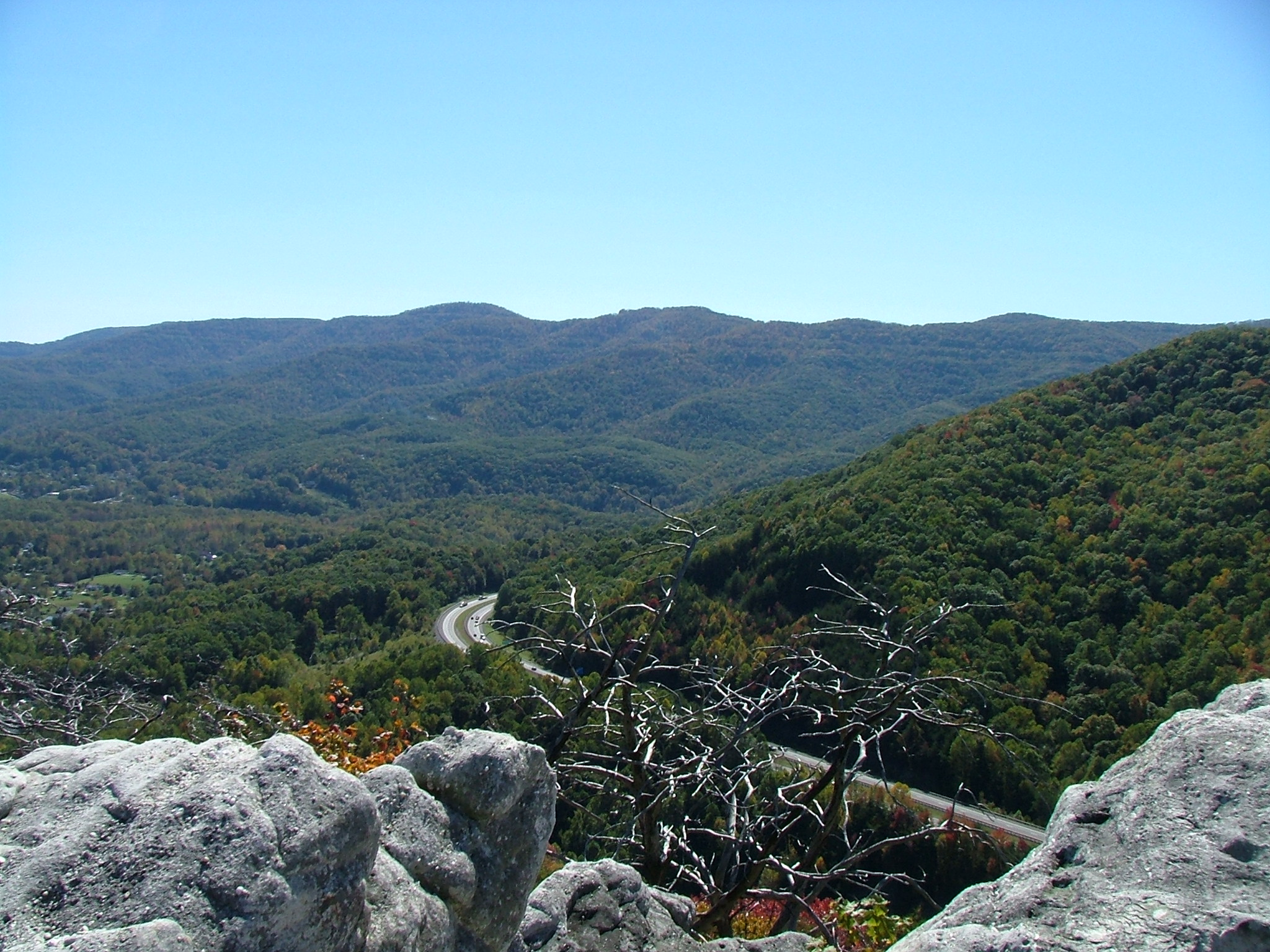
- View of Cross Mountain, the highest summit of the Cumberland Mountains in Tennessee

Highest point
- Peak: High Knob
- Elevation: 4,223 ft (1,287 m)

Dimensions
- Length: 131 mi (211 km)
- Width: 20 mi (32 km)

Geography
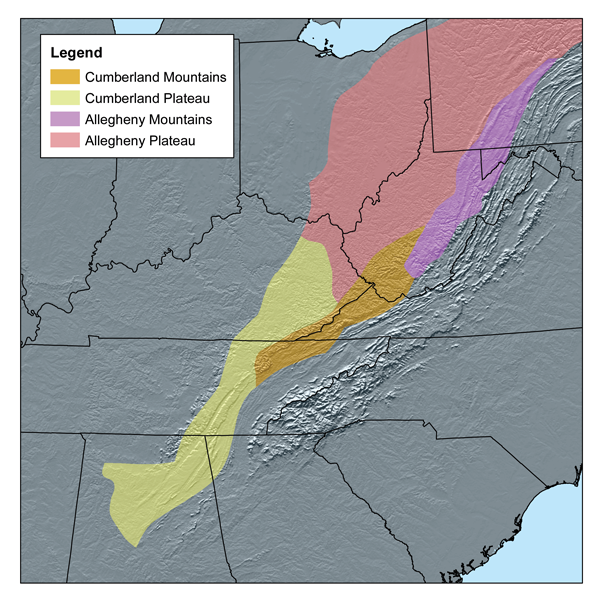
- Map showing the Cumberland Mountains in orange
- Country: United States
- States: West Virginia; Virginia; Kentucky; Tennessee
- Range coordinates: 36°36′14″N 83°40′27″W

The Cumberland Mountains or Cumberland Highlands are a mountain range in the southeastern section of the Appalachian Mountains. They are located in western Virginia, southwestern West Virginia, the eastern edges of Kentucky, and eastern middle Tennessee, including the Crab Orchard Mountains. Their highest peak, with an elevation of 4,223 feet (1,287 m) above mean sea level, is High Knob, which is located near Norton, Virginia.

According to the USGS, the Cumberland Mountain range is 131 miles (211 km) long and 20 miles (32 km) wide, bounded by the Russell Fork on the northeast, the Pound River and Powell River on the southeast, Cove Creek on the southwest, and Tackett Creek, the Cumberland River, Poor Fork Cumberland River, and Elkhorn Creek on the northwest. The crest of the range forms the Kentucky and Virginia boundary from the Tennessee border to the Russell Fork River.

Variant names of the Cumberland Mountains include Cumberland Mountain, Cumberland Range, Ouasioto Mountains, Ouasiota Mountains, Laurel Mountain, and Pine Mountain. They are named for Prince William, Duke of Cumberland.

The Cumberland Mountains range includes Pine Mountain, Cross Mountain, Cumberland Mountain, Log Mountain, Little Black Mountain, and Black (Big Black) Mountain, as well as others.

== Conservation ==
Oak Ridge National Laboratory (Oak Ridge, Tennessee) is involved with the conservation of the mixed mesophytic forests within the northern Cumberland Plateau in Tennessee. The conservation organizations include The Nature Conservancy, the Doris Duke Charitable Foundation, and the Natural Resources Defense Council with focus on the Cumberland Plateau.

== Geology and physiography ==
The Cumberland Mountains are a physiographic section of the larger Appalachian Plateau province, which in turn is part of the larger Appalachian physiographic division.

=== Pine Mountain ===
Pine Mountain is a long, narrow ridge starting in northern Tennessee and extending northeastward into southeastern Kentucky and southwestern Virginia. Its southwestern terminus is near Pioneer, Tennessee, and it extends approximately 122 miles (196 km) to the northeast to near the Breaks Interstate Park in Kentucky and Virginia.

==== Geology of Pine Mountain ====
Pine Mountain is at the headward ramp of the Pine Mountain Thrust Fault. The hard Lee-type sandstones of the Early Pennsylvanian form the ridge line. The sandstone strata crop out here because northwestward movement along the thrust fault caused these sandstones to be pushed up the ramp and over younger strata. Because the sandstones are resistant to erosion, they form a prominent ridge along this ramp. The southwestern terminus of Pine Mountain is marked by the northwest-trending Jacksboro Fault, a lateral ramp fault (part of the Pine Mountain Thrust Fault).

The northwestern slope of Pine Mountain is cliff-lined (escarpment slope) whereas the southeastern slope is gentle, this is the dip slope, and it is roughly parallel to the dip of the sandstones. This is also the northern limb of the Middlesboro Syncline.

Several gaps occur along Pine Mountain, and these are usually caused by erosion along cross-cutting faults. These gaps include the gap at High Cliff, Tennessee (near Jellico), the Narrows gap at Pineville, Kentucky, and Pound Gap near Jenkins, Kentucky. There are other minor gaps as well.

=== Cumberland Mountain ===
Cumberland Mountain, not to be confused with the Cumberland Mountains within which it resides, is a long ridge extending from northeastern Tennessee, southeastern Kentucky and southwestern Virginia. Its peak forms the boundary between Kentucky and Virginia in some areas. The southeastern side of Cumberland Mountain is a cliff-lined wall that was a barrier to exploration and settlement in Kentucky during the westward expansion in the late eighteenth century. The famous Cumberland Gap is one of several gaps along Cumberland Mountain that allowed access across the mountain.

Cumberland Mountain is a long ridge running from near Caryville, Tennessee, northeastward to near Norton, Virginia, a distance of approximately 97 miles (156 km). The southeastern slope of the ridge is cliff lined, whereas the northwestern slope is more gentle. The ridge is interrupted by several gaps, including Cumberland Gap, Big Creek Gap between Ivydell and LaFollette, Tennessee, Pennington Gap near Pennington Gap, Virginia, and Big Stone Gap near Big Stone Gap, Virginia. The crest of Cumberland Mountain ranges from 2,200 feet (670 m) to 3,500 feet (1,100 m) in elevation. Cumberland Mountain is roughly parallel to Pine Mountain which lies from eight to ten miles to the northwest.

==== Geology of Cumberland Mountain ====
Cumberland Mountain is part of the Cumberland Overthrust Sheet or block and is the northern limb of the Powell Valley Anticline, a ramp anticline. The ridge exists because hard Lee-type sandstones of Early Pennsylvanian Age crop out along this line. Softer rocks have been eroded away, leaving the resistant sandstones to form a ridge. The southwestern terminus of Cumberland Mountain is marked by the northwest-trending Jacksboro Fault, a lateral ramp fault (part of the Pine Mountain Thrust Fault). The northwestern terminus is located near Norton, Virginia, where the hard sandstones dip below the surface as the axis of the Powell Valley anticline plunges to the northeast. The various gaps in Cumberland Mountain are caused by rock weaknesses at cross-cutting faults or joints. For example, Cumberland Gap was caused by erosion along the cross-cutting Rocky Face Fault.

The cliff-lined southeastern slope (escarpment slope) of Cumberland Mountain was created by erosion along the breached side of the Powell Valley Anticline. The more-gentle northwestern slope is the dip slope and roughly parallel to the dip of the Early Pennsylvanian sandstones. This northwestward dip is the northern limb of the Powell Valley Anticline.

Cumberland Mountain forms the drainage divide between the Cumberland River to the north and the Powell River to the south.

=== Synclinal mountains ===
Several mountains that lie between Pine Mountain and Cumberland Mountain include Black Mountain and Little Black Mountain as well as a number of smaller mountains (Short, Walnut, Rich, Log, Reynolds, etc.). These are all synclinal mountains and reside along the axis of the northeast-trending Middlesboro Syncline. The Pine Mountain ramp forms the northwestern limb of this syncline and Cumberland Mountain (the northwestern limb of the Powell Valley Anticline) forms the southeastern limb.

== See also ==
- Cumberland Gap National Historical Park
- Cumberland Plateau
