= Fraterville, Tennessee =

Fraterville
- Unincorporated community
- Location within the state of Tennessee Fraterville (the United States)
- Coordinates: 36°11′48″N 84°10′20″W
- Country: United States
- State: Tennessee
- County: Anderson
- Elevation: 909 ft (277 m)
- Time zone: UTC-5 (Eastern (EST))
  - Summer (DST): UTC-4 (EDT)
- GNIS feature ID: 1284843

Fraterville, Tennessee is an unincorporated community located on State Route 116 in Anderson County, Tennessee, between the towns of Rocky Top and Briceville. It is included in the Knoxville, Tennessee Metropolitan Statistical Area.

== History ==
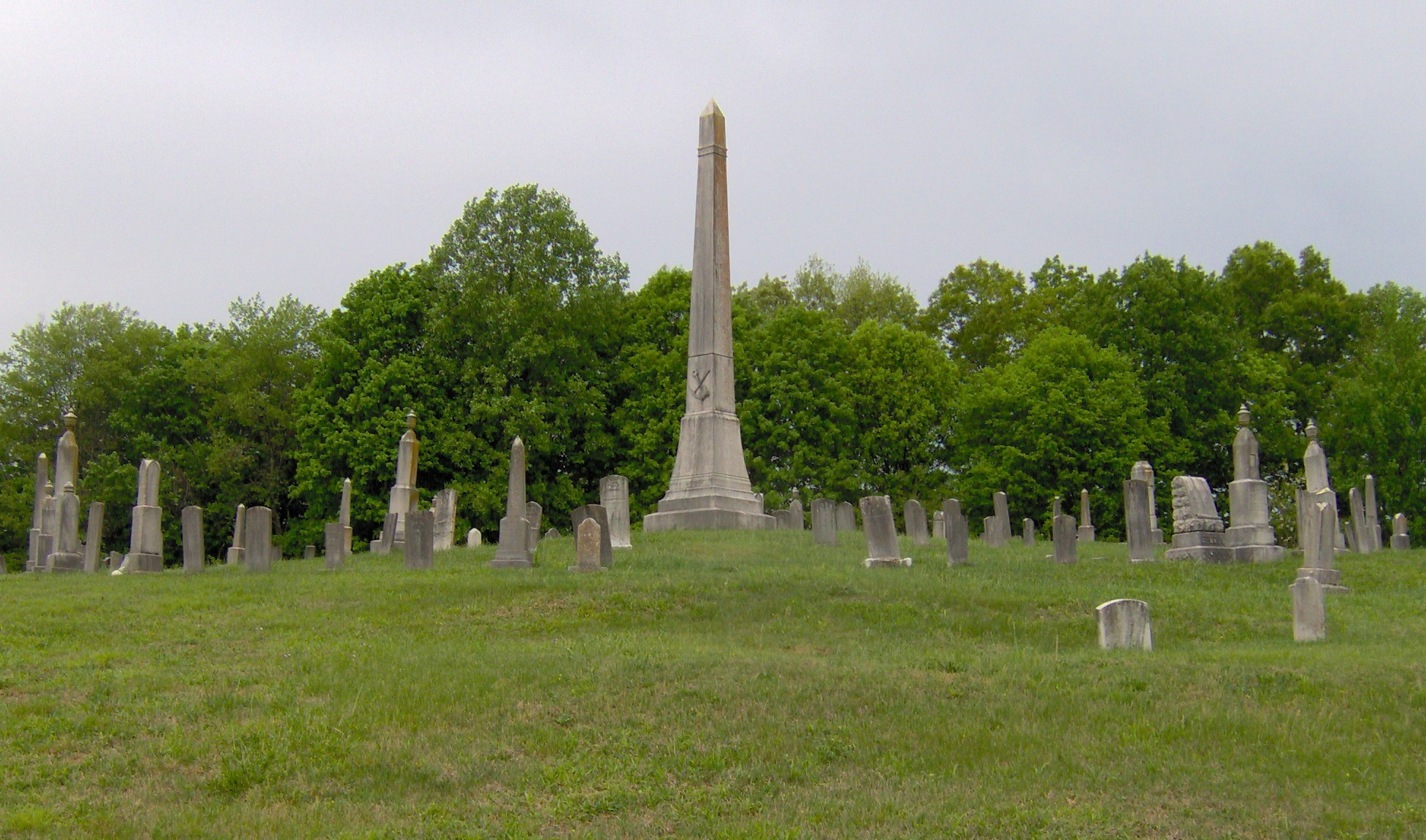
Leach Cemetery which serves as the final resting place of 89 miners killed in the Fraterville Mine disaster.

Fraterville, which has a history of coal mining, is known for the Fraterville Mine Disaster that occurred there in 1902.

The name of the community, which is derived from the Latin word frater, means "village of brothers."
