= National Register of Historic Places listings in Anderson County, Tennessee =

Location of Anderson County in Tennessee

This is a list of the National Register of Historic Places listings in Anderson County, Tennessee.

This is intended to be a complete list of the properties and districts on the National Register of Historic Places in Anderson County, Tennessee, United States. Latitude and longitude coordinates are provided for many National Register properties and districts; these locations may be seen together in a map.

There are 20 properties and districts in the county that are listed on the National Register, and one former listing.

See also National Register of Historic Places listings in Roane County, Tennessee for additional properties in Oak Ridge and Oliver Springs, cities that span the county line.

Contents: Counties in Tennessee
Anderson – Bedford – Benton – Bledsoe – Blount – Bradley – Campbell – Cannon – Carroll – Carter – Cheatham – Chester – Claiborne – Clay – Cocke – Coffee – Crockett – Cumberland – Davidson – Decatur – DeKalb – Dickson – Dyer – Fayette – Fentress – Franklin – Gibson – Giles – Grainger – Greene – Grundy – Hamblen – Hamilton – Hancock – Hardeman – Hardin – Hawkins – Haywood – Henderson – Henry – Hickman – Houston – Humphreys – Jackson – Jefferson – Johnson – Knox – Lake – Lauderdale – Lawrence – Lewis – Lincoln – Loudon – Macon – Madison – Marion – Marshall – Maury – McMinn – McNairy – Meigs – Monroe – Montgomery – Moore – Morgan – Obion – Overton – Perry – Pickett – Polk – Putnam – Rhea – Roane – Robertson – Rutherford – Scott – Sequatchie – Sevier – Shelby – Smith – Stewart – Sullivan – Sumner – Tipton – Trousdale – Unicoi – Union – Van Buren – Warren – Washington – Wayne – Weakley – White – Williamson – Wilson

This National Park Service list is complete through NPS recent listings posted March 21, 2025.

== Current listings ==
	Name on the Register	Image	Date listed	Location	City or town	Description
1	Arnwine Cabin	Arnwine Cabin	March 16, 1976 (#76001760)	State Route 61; 36°10′53″N 84°04′10″W	Norris	Part of the collection of the Museum of Appalachia
2	Bear Creek Road Checking Station	Bear Creek Road Checking Station	May 6, 1992 (#92000411)	Junction of S. Illinois Ave. and Bear Creek Rd. 35°59′57″N 84°14′35″W	Oak Ridge	
3	Bethel Valley Road Checking Station	Bethel Valley Road Checking Station	May 6, 1992 (#92000410)	Junction of Bethel Valley and Scarboro Rds. 35°59′13″N 84°13′02″W	Oak Ridge	
4	Briceville Community Church and Cemetery	Briceville Community Church and Cemetery	July 24, 2003 (#03000697)	State Route 116; 36°10′43″N 84°10′59″W	Briceville	Rural Gothic Revival church, now primarily a community center
5	Cross - Boggs Place		May 6, 2024 (#100010138)	453 Oliver Springs Highway; 36°04′05″N 84°12′45″W	Clinton	
6	Cross Mountain Miners' Circle	Cross Mountain Miners' Circle	March 15, 2006 (#06000134)	Circle Cemetery Ln. 36°10′26″N 84°11′11″W	Briceville	
7	Daugherty Furniture Building	Daugherty Furniture Building	November 29, 2010 (#10000936)	307 N. Main St. 36°06′09″N 84°07′55″W	Clinton	
8	Edwards-Fowler House		May 29, 1975 (#75001726)	3½ miles south of Rocky Top on Dutch Valley Rd. 36°10′18″N 84°10′03″W	Rocky Top	
9	Fort Anderson on Militia Hill	Fort Anderson on Militia Hill	November 21, 2011 (#11000830)	Vowell Mountain Rd. 36°12′56″N 84°10′32″W	Rocky Top	Site of the Tennessee state militia's garrison during the Coal Creek War of 1891 and 1892, when local coal miners and the state government battled over the use of convict labor in area coal mines.
10	Fraterville Miners' Circle Cemetery	Fraterville Miners' Circle Cemetery	January 5, 2005 (#04001459)	Leach Cemetery Lane; 36°12′39″N 84°08′25″W	Rocky Top	
11	Freels Cabin	Freels Cabin	May 6, 1992 (#92000407)	Freels Bend Rd. 35°57′48″N 84°13′25″W	Oak Ridge	Also called "Freels Bend Cabin"; built in 1844, currently located on restricted federal property
12	J. B. Jones House	J. B. Jones House	September 5, 1991 (#19910905)	Old Edgemoor Road between Bethel Valley Road and Melton Hill Lake; 36°00′33″N 84°10′09″W	Oak Ridge	
13	Green McAdoo School	Green McAdoo School	November 8, 2005 (#05001218)	101 School St. 36°06′16″N 84°08′24″W	Clinton	
14	Norris Dam State Park Rustic Cabins Historic District	Norris Dam State Park Rustic Cabins Historic District	July 25, 2014 (#14000446)	125 Village Green Circle; 36°13′32″N 84°05′10″W	Rocky Top	
15	Norris District	Norris District	July 10, 1975 (#75001727)	City of Norris on U.S. Route 441; 36°11′47″N 84°04′08″W	Norris	
16	Norris Hydroelectric Project	Norris Hydroelectric Project	April 12, 2016 (#16000165)	300 Powerhouse Way; 36°13′27″N 84°05′32″W	Norris	Extends into Campbell County
17	Oak Ridge Historic District	Oak Ridge Historic District	September 5, 1991 (#91001109)	Roughly bounded by East Drive, West Outer Drive, Louisiana Avenue, and Tennessee Avenue; 36°01′41″N 84°15′10″W	Oak Ridge	Contributing properties in the historic district include United Church, The Chapel on the Hill, the Alexander Inn, and the elementary school now occupied by the Children's Museum of Oak Ridge.
18	Oliver Springs Banking Company	Oliver Springs Banking Company	April 14, 1992 (#92000357)	410 Main St. 36°02′43″N 84°20′23″W	Oliver Springs	
19	Ritz Theatre and Hoskins Rexall Drug Store No. 2	Ritz Theatre and Hoskins Rexall Drug Store No. 2	December 4, 1998 (#98001446)	111-121 N. Main St. 36°06′00″N 84°07′59″W	Clinton	Hoskins Drug Store is a family-owned business that was established on Market Street in Clinton in 1930 by R.C. "Dudley" Hoskins. The Main Street location, which is part of the National Register listing, opened in 1947. At one time there were as many as 13 Hoskins stores in East Tennessee.
20	Woodland-Scarboro Historic District	Woodland-Scarboro Historic District	September 5, 1991 (#91001106)	Roughly bounded by Rutgers Avenue, Lafayette Drive, Benedict Avenue, Wilberforce Avenue, and Illinois Avenue; 36°00′16″N 84°15′06″W	Oak Ridge	

== Former listings ==
	Name on the Register	Image	Date listed	Date removed	Location	City or town	Description
1	Luther Brannon House	Luther Brannon House	September 5, 1991 (#91001108)	October 28, 2021	151 Oak Ridge Turnpike; 36°02′40″N 84°12′34″W	Oak Ridge	Demolished in 2021.

== See also ==
- List of National Historic Landmarks in Tennessee
- National Register of Historic Places listings in Tennessee
