= Tennessee State Route 116 =

State highway in Tennessee, United States

State Route 116
- TN 116 highlighted in red

Route information
- Maintained by TDOT
- Length: 41.97 mi (67.54 km)

Major junctions
- South end: SR 62 near Petros
- SR 330 in Laurel Grove; US 25W in Rocky Top; US 441 in Rocky Top; I-75 / US 25W in Rocky Top
- North end: US 25W / SR 63 in Caryville

Location
- Country: United States
- State: Tennessee
- Counties: Morgan, Anderson, Campbell

Highway system
- Tennessee State Routes; Interstate; US; State
← SR 115	→ SR 117

State Route 116 (SR 116) is a 41.97-mile-long (67.54 km) north–south state highway in the mountains of East Tennessee. The highway runs from its junction with SR 62 at its southern end between Wartburg and Coalfield in Morgan County, to its northern end at Caryville, Tennessee in Campbell County.

== Route description ==
From its southwestern terminus SR 116 heads northeast and passes through the town of Petros and past Brushy Mountain State Penitentiary.

Continuing northeast into Anderson County (along a mountain pass known locally as Petros Mountain), the highway then passes through remote mountainous country known for its many former coal mining villages, some of which were company towns and are now essentially ghost towns. Among them are the towns (or former towns) of Fork Mountain, Buffalo, Devonia (a/k/a Moore's Camp), Braytown, Rosedale, and Charley's Branch. The Devonia post office which served this entire region was closed in 1975. Once the mines in these towns closed down with the resulting loss of population, the towns' schools were closed and remaining students were consolidated into the Rosedale school, which saw steadily falling enrollment and was closed in the 1990s. This section of SR 116 parallels the New River and the former line of the Tennessee Railroad. There are many abandoned underground coal mines, coal tipples, and railroad yards and sidings along this section of SR 116. Despite the end of most underground mining and the demise of the towns along this portion of the highway, a great deal of strip mining continues however.

SR 116 briefly passes into Campbell County and then turns southeast back into Anderson County. From there it passes through the village of Stainville (more commonly known as Ligias Fork) and continues southeast through some remote, sparsely populated mountains (along a very long and steep mountain pass locally known as Graves Gap) to Laurel Grove. There it turns northeast again at the junction with Frost Bottom Road, since 1982 designated as SR 330. This section of the highway parallels Walden Ridge to the immediate southeast, and a former spur of the Norfolk Southern Railway (now closed), and passes through Briceville and Fraterville, the latter of which was the site of a 1902 mine explosion, "The Wye" near the former mining camp of Beech Grove, and finally through a gap in Walden Ridge to enter Rocky Top.

Petros, Briceville, Rocky Top, and Caryville are the only towns of any sizeable population today along SR 116.

== History ==
Originally the northeastern terminus of SR 116 was in Rocky Top at the junction with US 25W. About 1982, SR 116 was extended northward to Caryville to incorporate the portion of the former US 25W between Rocky Top and Caryville superseded by I-75. This addition to SR 116 parallels the busy railroad lines of both the CSX and Norfolk Southern Railway, and I-75 immediately to the west as it passes through the community of Vasper.

The highway has had a high rate of accidents, including fatal accidents, attributed to conditions including narrow shoulders, numerous curves, unstable slopes, rockfall hazards, and absence of guardrails. In 2013, the Tennessee Department of Transportation announced plans for $1.2 million in roadway improvements, including widening of shoulders and addition of guardrails, pavement markings and signs.

== Junction list ==
County	Location	mi	km	Destinations	Notes
Morgan	Joyner	0.00	0.00	SR 62 (Knoxville Highway) – Wartburg, Coalfield, Oliver Springs	Southern terminus
Anderson	No major junctions				
Campbell	No major junctions				
Anderson	Laurel Grove			SR 330 south (Frost Bottom Road) – Oliver Springs	Northern terminus of SR 330; SR 116 becomes Fraterville Miners' Memorial Highway
Anderson	Rocky Top			US 25W south (Main Street/SR 9) – Clinton	Southern end of US 25W concurency
Anderson	Rocky Top			US 441 south (Norris Freeway/SR 71) – Norris Dam State Park, Norris	Northern terminus of US 441
Anderson	Rocky Top			I-75 / US 25W north (SR 9) – Knoxville, Lexington	Northern end of US 25W concurrency; I-75 exit 129
Campbell	Caryville	41.97	67.54	US 25W / SR 63 (Veterans Memorial Highway/SR 9) – Caryville, Jacksboro, LaFollette	Northern terminus
1.000 mi = 1.609 km; 1.000 km = 0.621 mi: Concurrency terminus
