= Daugherty Furniture Building =

- U.S. National Register of Historic Places
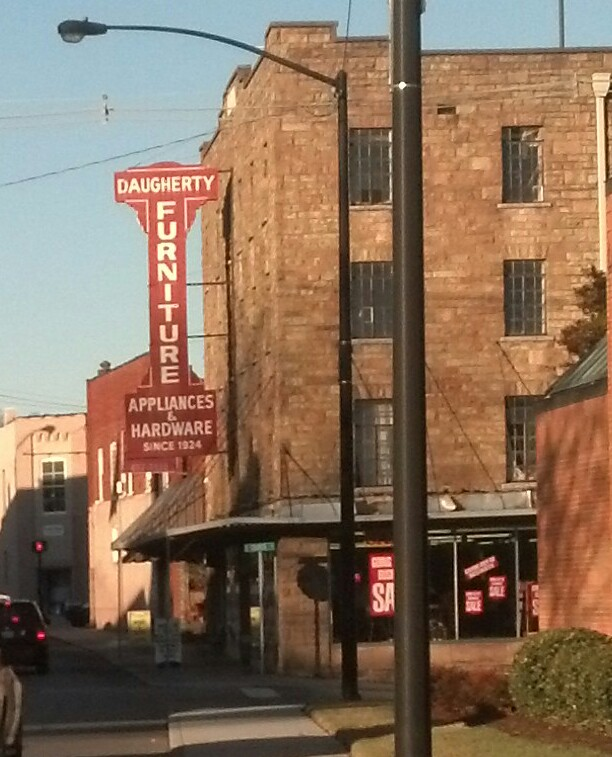

- Location within Tennessee Location within the United States
- Location: 307 N. Main St., Clinton, Tennessee
- Coordinates: 36°6′9.37″N 84°7′54.96″W
- Area: 0.266 acres (0.108 ha)
- Built: 1942
- Architect: Clem H. Meyers
- NRHP reference No.: 10000936
- Added to NRHP: November 29, 2010

The Daugherty Furniture Building, also known as the J.R. Daugherty Company Building, is a former store located in Clinton, Tennessee. It sold furniture, appliances, hardware, flooring, and other household items, until its closure in 1985. The building was designed by architect Clem H. Meyers, and was constructed between the years 1938 and 1942. In 2010, it was listed on the National Register of Historic Places.

== History ==
The furniture store was originally located in Fork Mountain, Tennessee, but was moved to Clinton in the late 1930s because of the population growth of Anderson County. More than 75,000 individuals had moved to the area in a two-year period, and the demand for household items was high. Daugherty Furniture Store served as the only "one-stop shop" for Anderson County residents. The store offered home delivery, with a fleet of delivery trucks. The third and fourth floors of the building served as apartments, which housed Oak Ridge workers and scientists in need of housing in a region running out of housing options. The business expanded into the nearby regions, and the main location served as a meeting place for local businessmen. The attention and popularity of the main location helped to develop the neighborhood of Market and Main Streets in Clinton.

The store was owned and operated by the family, and most of the employees were family members. Daugherty's brothers, Leonard, Emmitt, and Laford, worked for the shop, with Leonard serving as a manager overseeing deliveries and purchases. Their sons, along with Daugherty's sons, all worked at the store and remained working there until its closing in 1985. All employees were trained to be familiar with the store's merchandise, including demonstrating Singer sewing machines. Employees also provided repair services, both in-store and in the homes of customers. Many employees lived in the upstairs apartments, and Daugherty lived in the corner unit and oversaw the company until his death in 1985.

== Architecture ==
The original building was located in Fork Mountain, Tennessee, and was a simple one-story building. When Daugherty moved to Clinton in 1935, he rented two buildings across the street from where the current building stands. While planning to build a new location, he found inspiration in a building in Oak Ridge owned by Elza Gate. Gate's home, known as the Glenn Copeland House, was entirely faced in stone (except the roof). Daugherty would use Frank Gilbreath as an advisor on building his store; Gilbreath served as stonemason on the Glenn Copeland House.

When Daugherty began exploring options for building his store, his friends and colleagues advised him to avoid building a multi-story building. He hired architect Clem H. Meyer, who had designed Huntsville High School in Scott County, Tennessee. Oba Hill was also hired, who worked alongside Gilbreath on the stone work.

About 99,000 pounds of locally quarried stone was used on the buildings exterior, most which came from areas near the New River region of Morgan County and Scruggs Farm in Bethel. All of the stone was hand-chiseled and laid by Gilbreath and Sebastian Marie, another local stone cutter. When the building was complete, in 1942, it was the largest commercial building in Clinton, along with Magnet Mills, Inc.

The Daugherty Furniture Building doesn't touch on traditional architectural styles, but serves as an example of vernacular architecture, by using local construction methods and materials. The buildings interior, from the fourth floor to the basement, looks like an inverted step pyramid. The load bearing walls are stair-stepped, therefore the fifth floor walls are thinner than those in the basement; the basement walls are 26 inches thick, with the fifth floor being 12 inches. The architecture of the building was also influenced by Meyer's work on Huntsville High School, using techniques found in that project. Examples include the rectangular shape, stone exterior, and rectangular steel windows. The design is also minimalistic, reflecting the wartime emphasis on simplicity seen in design during the period.
