= Fork Mountain =

Fork Mountain may refer to:

- Fork Mountain (New York), a mountain in the Catskills
- Fork Mountain, Tennessee, a former coal mining camp in Morgan County
- Fork Mountain, Virginia, an unincorporated community in Botetourt County

== See also ==
- Mountain Fork, a river in western Arkansas
