= Devonia, Tennessee =

Devonia
- Unincorporated community
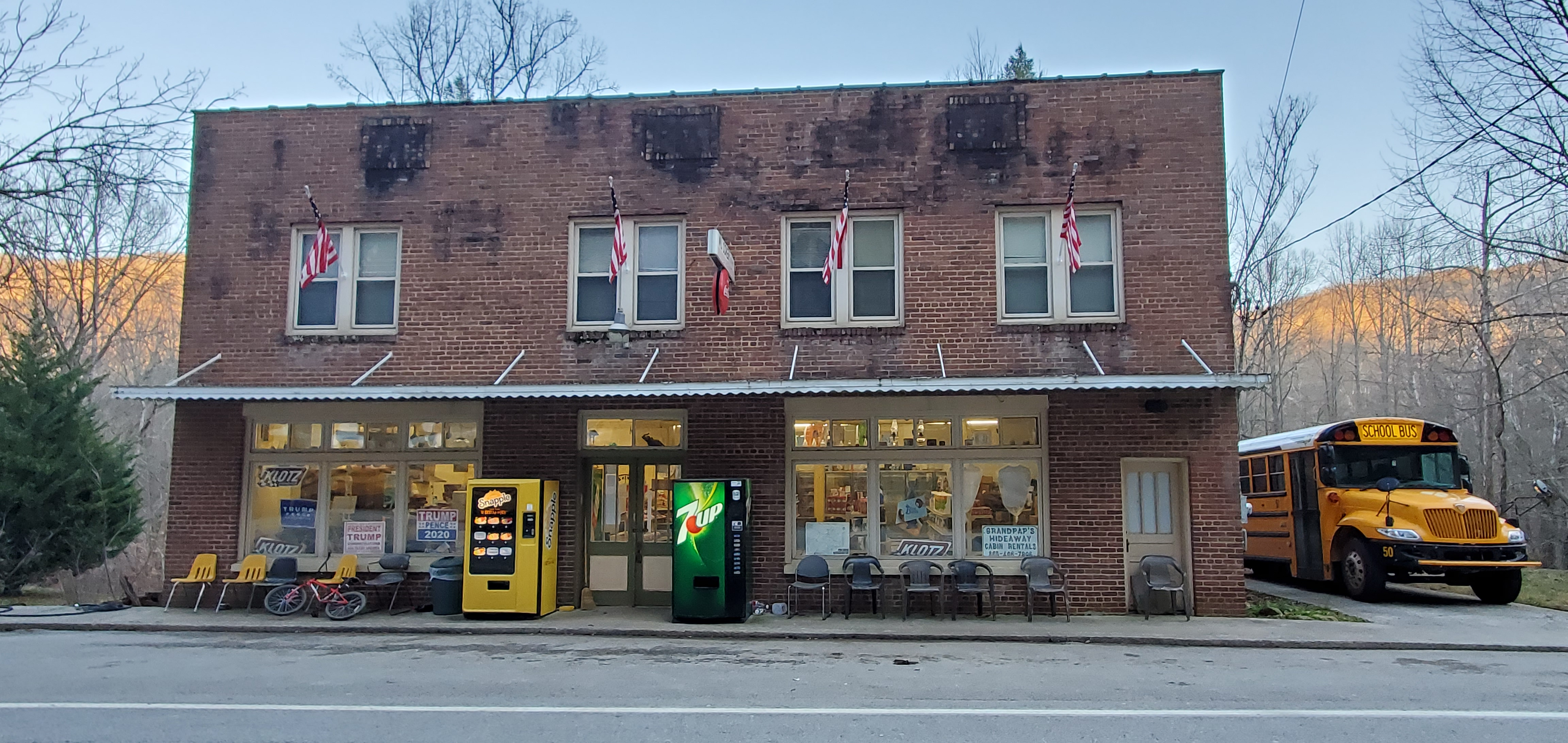
- New River General Store

- Location within the state of Tennessee Devonia (the United States)
- Coordinates: 36°8′53″N 84°23′8″W
- Country: United States
- State: Tennessee
- County: Anderson
- Time zone: UTC-5 (Eastern (EST))
  - Summer (DST): UTC-4 (EDT)

Devonia was the United States Post Office designation for the former coal mining camp in Anderson County, Tennessee, also known as Moore's Camp. The Devonia post office, established in 1920, served Moore's Camp, plus the nearby communities of Rosedale, Fork Mountain, Braytown, and Charley's Branch, until it closed in 1975.

Devonia is the site of a coal preparation plant, which has since been shutdown. Tennessee State Route 116 traverses the area and a 42-mile (68 km) railroad line used to connect the community with Oneida, Tennessee until it was abandoned in 2013.
