= Rugby, Tennessee =

Unincorporated community in the United States

- Rugby Colony
- U.S. National Register of Historic Places
- U.S. Historic district
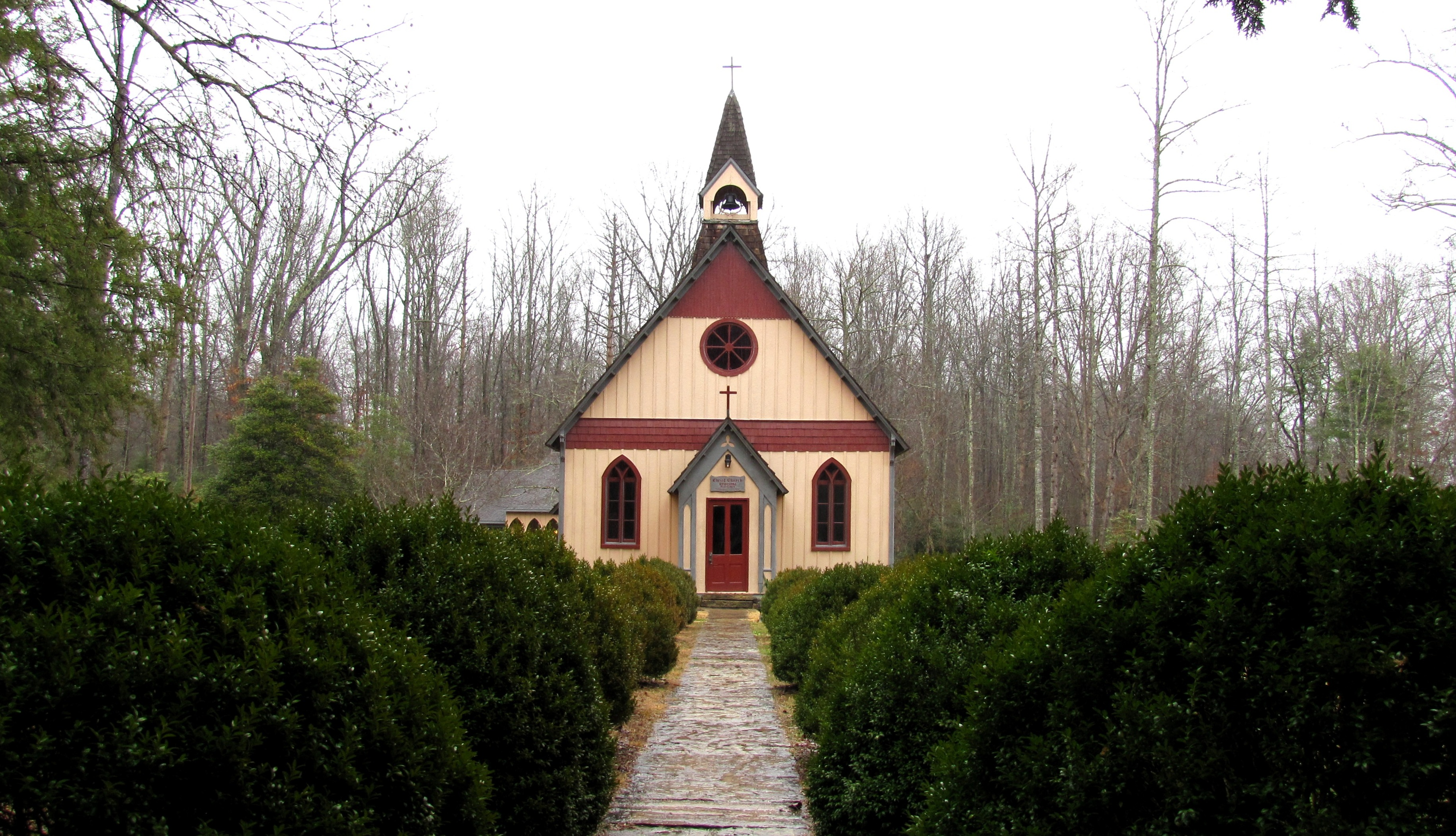
- Christ Church Episcopal at Rugby

- Location within Tennessee Location within the United States
- Location: TN 52; Rugby, Tennessee
- Nearest city: Huntsville, Tennessee
- Coordinates: 36°21′40″N 84°42′1″W
- Area: 525 acres (212 ha)
- Built: 1880
- Architectural style: Gothic
- NRHP reference No.: 72001249
- Added to NRHP: April 26, 1972

Rugby is an unincorporated community in Morgan and Scott counties in the U.S. state of Tennessee. Founded in 1880 by English author Thomas Hughes, Rugby was built as an experimental utopian colony. While Hughes's experiment largely failed, a small community lingered at Rugby throughout the 20th century. In the 1960s, residents, friends and descendants of Rugby began restoring the original design and layout of the community, preserving surviving structures and reconstructing others. Rugby's Victorian architecture and picturesque setting have since made it a popular tourist attraction. In 1972, Rugby's historic area was listed under the name Rugby Colony on the National Register of Historic Places as a historic district.

The Rugby experiment grew out of the social and economic conditions of Victorian England, where the practice of primogeniture and an economic depression had left many of the "second sons" of the English gentry jobless and idle. Hughes envisioned Rugby as a colony where England's second sons would have a chance to own land and be free of social and moral ills that plagued late-19th-century English cities. The colony would reject late Victorian materialism in favor of the Christian socialist ideals of equality and cooperation espoused in Hughes's Tom Brown's School Days.

From the outset, however, the colony was beset with problems, namely a typhoid epidemic in 1881, lawsuits over land titles, and a population unaccustomed to the hard manual labor required to extract crops from the poor soil of the Cumberland Plateau. By late 1887, most of the original colonists had either died or moved away from Rugby. However, a few carried on into the 20th century and the village retained a small, continuous population.

== Geography ==
Rugby is located atop the Cumberland Plateau near the junction of Morgan, Scott, and Fentress counties. While it straddles the two former counties, the majority of it lies in Morgan County. On the north side of Rugby, the Clear Fork joins White Oak Creek to form a natural pool known as "The Meeting of the Waters" that has been a popular hiking destination since the colony's early days. Beyond Meeting-of-the-Waters, the Clear Fork continues northeastward for another 9 miles (14 km) to where it joins New River to form the Big South Fork of the Cumberland River.

State Route 52 passed through the town, until December 2013 when the "Rugby Bypass" opened, connecting it with U.S. Route 127 in Jamestown to the west and U.S. Route 27 in the community of Elgin to the east. The area is relatively remote, with the 125,000-acre (510 km^{2}) Big South Fork National River and Recreation Area dominating the area to the north, and sparsely populated rolling hills stretching for miles to the south. Most of the historic district is located on or near Tennessee state highway 52. A more modern residential area is located in the Beacon Hill section on the north side of the community.

== History ==
=== Establishment ===
Thomas Hughes was born in Uffington, Oxfordshire, England in 1822. In the 1830s, he attended the Rugby School in Rugby, Warwickshire, where he was greatly influenced by the school's progressive headmaster, Thomas Arnold. Both Rugby School and Arnold figured prominently in Hughes's 1857 novel, Tom Brown's School Days, and the school would eventually be the namesake for Hughes's utopian colony in Tennessee. In Tom Brown's School Days, Hughes espoused the ideals of Christian socialism, namely the cooperative ownership of community businesses. By the 1860s, Hughes had grown disenchanted with the materialism of late Victorian England. He was disheartened by the fact that the talents of many of England's younger sons were wasted due to an economic recession and the medieval system of primogeniture, in which the oldest son inherited all of the family's land.

In 1870, Hughes traveled to America to meet his friend, the poet James Russell Lowell, and learned of the Boston-based Board of Aid to Land Ownership, which specialized in helping unemployed urban craftsmen relocate to rural areas. Hughes indicated that such an operation might also be beneficial to young, unemployed English gentry. In 1878, Board of Aid president Franklin Webster Smith and an agent with the new Cincinnati Southern Railway, Cyrus Clarke, were travelling on the railroad's new tracks along the Cumberland Plateau when they identified the future site of Rugby, and were impressed with its virgin forests, clear air, and scenic gorges. Clarke secured options on hundreds of thousands of acres of Plateau land. Knoxville attorney Oliver Perry Temple, who became the colony's legal and agricultural advisor, began the complicated process of securing land titles.

Smith returned to Boston to recruit families to move to the newly acquired land on the Plateau, but economic conditions in the northeast had improved, and few families were interested in relocating. Smith then notified Hughes of the Board's new land acquisitions, and Hughes expressed interest in establishing a colony. Hughes formed a partnership with British lawyers Sir Henry Kimber and John Boyle, and bought the Board of Aid.

=== Rugby Colony, 1880–1887 ===
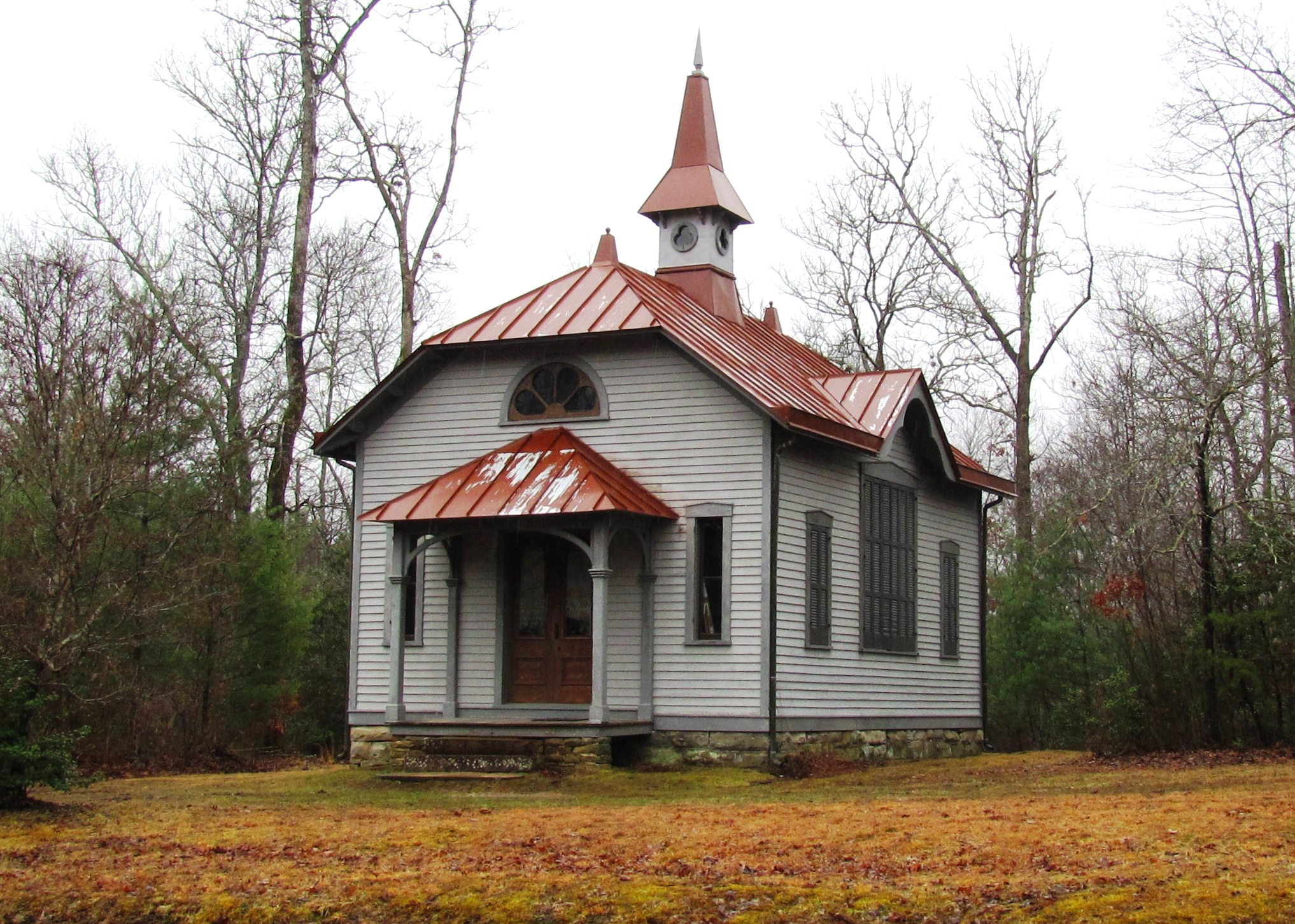
Thomas Hughes Library, built 1882

Franklin W. Smith, who was primarily responsible for Rugby's early layout, chose the townsite for Rugby for its resort-like qualities, even though it was 7 miles (11 km) from the nearest railroad stop at Sedgemoor (modern-day Elgin, Tennessee). The colony's first frame structure, known as the "Asylum" (now the Pioneer Cottage), was erected in early 1880, and the first wave of colonists constructed tennis and croquet courts, and built a walkway to "The Meeting of the Waters." Within a few months, several residences had been completed, along with the three-story Tabard Inn, which was named for the Southwark hostelry in Canterbury Tales.

Thomas Hughes was on hand for the colony's "opening" on October 5, 1880, and gave a speech that laid out his plans for Rugby. All colonists would be required to invest $5 in the commissary, thus ensuring public ownership. Personal freedoms were guaranteed, although the sale of alcohol was banned. The colony would build an Episcopal church, but the building could be used by any denomination. On opening day, Tennessee's Episcopal bishop, the Right Reverend Charles Quintard, chartered Christ Church and licensed colonist Joseph Blacklock as lay reader.

American publications such as The New York Times and Harper's Weekly and London publications such as The Spectator, Saturday Review, and Punch, all followed the colony's progress. Rugby published its own newspaper, The Rugbeian, which was edited by Oxford graduate Osmond Dakeyne, and several colonists formed a Library and Reading Room Society, headed by Tübingen graduate Edward Bertz, who was a long-term friend of the late nineteenth century English author George Gissing, with whom he corresponded over many years. In summer 1881, a typhoid outbreak killed seven colonists—including Dakeyne—and forced the Tabard Inn to close for cleansing, but the colony recovered. By 1884, the colony boasted over 400 residents, 65 frame public buildings and houses, a tennis team, a social club, and a literary and dramatic society. In 1885, Rugby established a university, Arnold School, named for Rugby School headmaster Thomas Arnold.

=== Struggle and decline ===
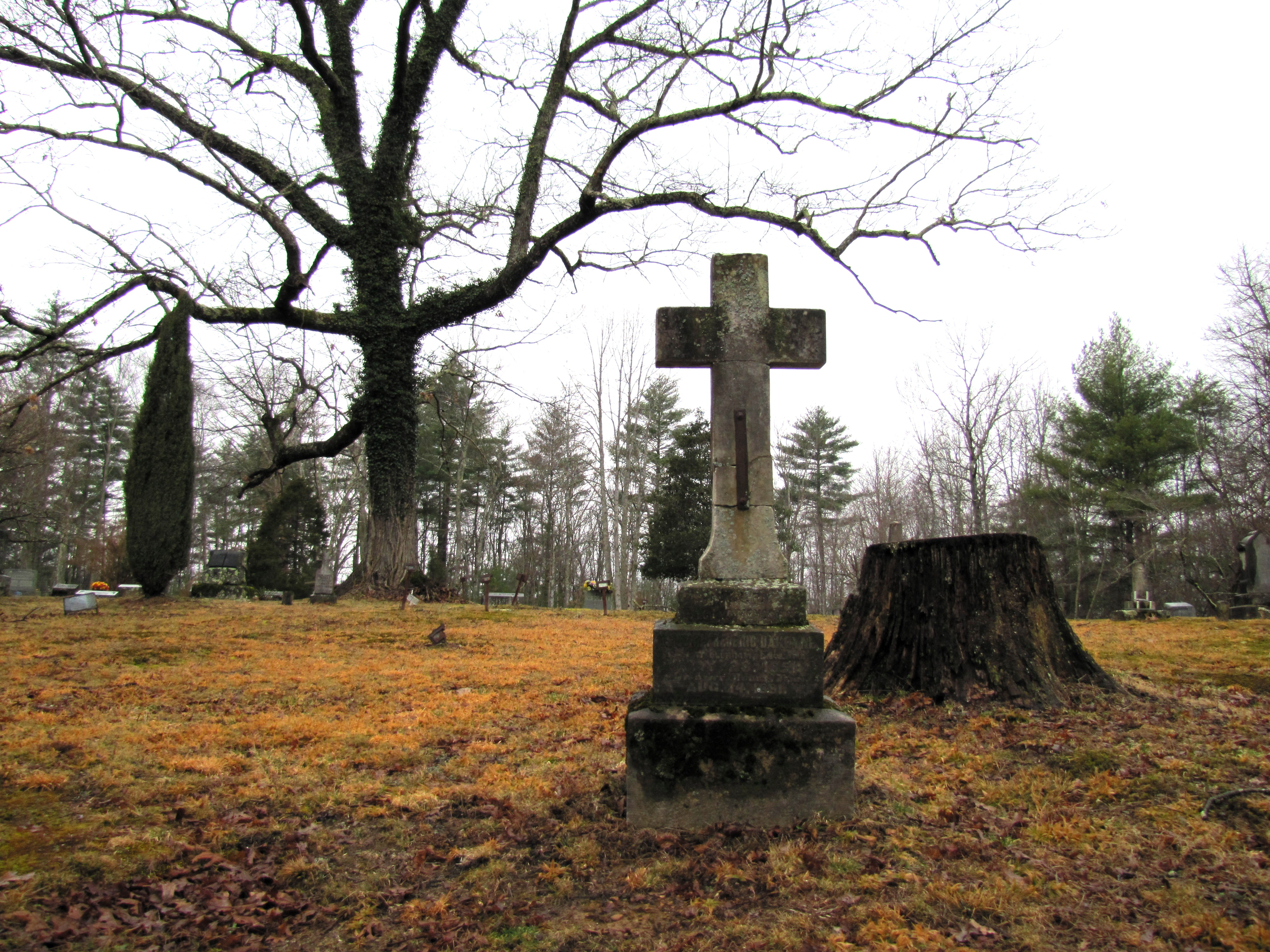
Laurel Dale Cemetery contains the graves of Rugby's 1881 typhoid victims along with Margaret Hughes and other early colonists

Throughout its early history, Rugby was beset with lawsuits over land titles. While Cyrus Clarke had obtained options on nearly 350,000 acres (140,000 ha) of land, many of the Plateau's Appalachian natives grew suspicious of Clarke and refused to sell their property. This slowed the colony's early development, and as the lawsuits dragged on, many colonists gave up and moved away. Furthermore, Smith, who had selected the townsite, had ignored the site's poor soil in favor of its potential as a mountain resort. Rugby's main resort hotel, the Tabard, was forced to close due to the typhoid outbreak in 1881, and burned down altogether in 1884, halting Rugby's burgeoning tourist economy and damaging the Board of Aid's credit.

Frustrated by the colony's slow development, the Board of Aid's London backers replaced colony director John Boyle with Irish-born Cincinnati city engineer Robert Walton in May 1882. Rugby attempted to establish a tomato canning operation in 1883, but after the cannery was constructed, colonists failed to grow enough tomatoes to keep it operational. Newspapers began to ridicule Rugby, with London's Daily News accusing Hughes of creating a "pleasure picnic" rather than a functioning colony, and The New York Times claiming that Hughes was planning to abandon the colony altogether.

In 1887, the deaths of a number of prominent colonists—including Hughes's mother, Margaret, and geologist Charles Wilson—led to the departure of most of Rugby's original settlers. That year, Hughes made his last annual visit to the colony, and The Rugbeian ceased publication. In 1892, Sir Henry Kimber reorganized the Board of Aid as the Rugby Tennessee Company, which focused on harvesting the region's natural resources, all but abandoning the anti-materialistic ideals on which the colony was founded. By 1900, the company had sold its Cumberland Plateau holdings.

=== Preservation ===
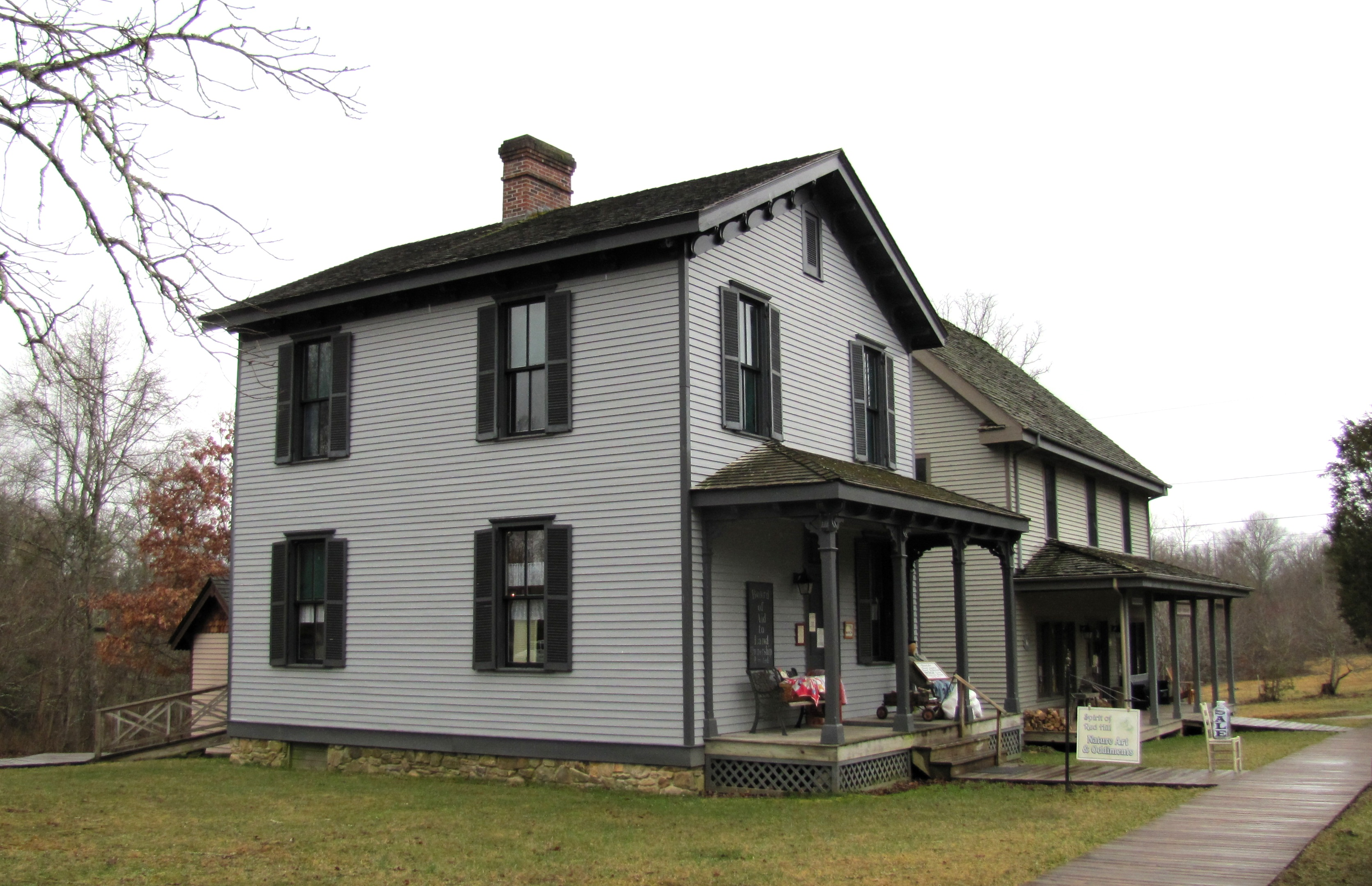
The reconstructed Board of Aid building (foreground) and the Rugby Commissary appear much as the originals did in the 1880s

Robert Walton's son, William (1887–1958), maintained the Thomas Hughes Library, the Christ Church Episcopal, and Kingstone Lisle until the mid-20th century. During the same period, Uffington House was maintained by the family of C.C. Brooks. Conservation efforts at Rugby began in the 1940s when logging practices were decimating the surrounding virgin forests. The efforts were publicized by The New York Times and The Washington Post, and gained federal support with the aide of Secretary of State Cordell Hull, but the state of Tennessee rejected the logging companies' offering price for the land, and the forest was cut right up to the community's boundaries.

In 1966, preservationists formed Historic Rugby, a non-profit group dedicated to restoring and maintaining the community's surviving historic structures, which include the Christ Church Episcopal, the Thomas Hughes Library, the Rugby School, Kingstone Lisle, Uffington House, and Newbury House. The group has also reconstructed several buildings based on their original designs, including the Board of Aid office, the Rugby Commissary, and Sir Henry Kimber's Percy Cottage. The Harrow Road Cafe, a restaurant built in the 1980s, was named for a restaurant that existed at Rugby in the 1880s, although its original design is unknown. The Cafe was destroyed by fire on September 4, 2020. The Rugby Printing Works, which originally stood at nearby Deer Lodge, was moved to Rugby in the 1970s. Historic Rugby opened up the community's Beacon Hill area (originally planned to include residences and a park) to new home construction, with the condition that all new homes must be designed in accordance with the community's Victorian aesthetic.

== Notable buildings ==
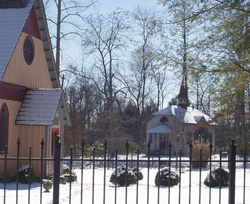
Christ Church (left) and Thomas Hughes Library in Rugby, Tennessee

=== Christ Church Episcopal ===
The Christ Church Episcopal was established on October 5, 1880, and initially used the original Rugby schoolhouse for services. The current building was built in the Carpenter Gothic style in 1887 by Cornelius Onderdonk, who constructed many of the original buildings in Rugby, and consecrated by Episcopal bishop Charles Quintard in 1888. The church's alms basin was designed by English carpenter Henry Fry, who had previously done work for various churches in the London area. The church's reed organ, built in 1849, is one of the oldest in the United States. The Christ Church parish has met here regularly since 1887.

=== Thomas Hughes Library ===
Built in 1882, the Thomas Hughes Library is the most unchanged of all the buildings in Rugby. The library's 7,000 volumes were collected primarily by Boston bookseller Estes & Lauriat, and donated to Rugby's Library and Reading Room Society with the stipulation they name the new library for Hughes. The library still contains most of its original collection, the oldest volume of which dates to 1687. German-born colonist Edward Bertz, Rugby's first librarian, published a book about his Rugby experiences, entitled Das Sabinergut, in 1896.

=== Kingstone Lisle ===
Kingstone Lisle, a Queen Anne-style cottage, was built in 1884 as a residence for Thomas Hughes, although Hughes stayed at the cottage for just a very short period on one of his annual visits (he usually stayed at the Newbury House). In the late 1880s, Hughes gave the house to Christ Church priest Joseph Blacklock for use as a rectory. Historic Rugby restored the house in the 1960s, and has outfitted it with period furniture.

=== Comprehensive list of historical structures ===
Structure	Image	Originally constructed / reconstructed (if not original)	Principal original owner	Named for
Christ Church Episcopal		1887		
Rugby School		1880/1907		
Thomas Hughes Library		1882		Author Thomas Hughes (1822–1896)
Kingstone Lisle		1884	Thomas Hughes	Community in Hughes's native Berkshire, England
Percy Cottage		1884/1970s	Sir Henry Kimber (1834–1923)	Kimber's son
Roslyn		1886	Montgomery Boyle	Roslyn Castle in Scotland
Walton Court		1881/2007	Robert Walton	Walton family ancestral home in County Cork, Ireland
Harrow Road Cafe		1880s/1985		Harrow Road in London
Rugby Printing Works		1880s	Abner Ross	Originally located at Deer Lodge, a nearby resort founded by Ross in the 1880s
Board of Aid to Land Ownership office		1880/1970s		
Rugby Commissary		1880/1970s	Publicly owned	
Ingleside		1884	Russell Sturgis	
Adena Cottage		1881	Frederick Wellman	Adena Mansion in Ohio, built for Wellman's grandfather-in-law
Wren's Nest		1887	Frederick Wellman	
The Lindens		1880	Nathan Tucker	Linden trees planted around the house
Newbury House		1880	Ross Brown	
Onderdonk House		1880s/2007		Rugby architect/builder Cornelius Onderdonk
Pioneer Cottage		1880		
Martin's Roost		1880s/1960s		
Oak Lodge		1881	T. Lyon White	
Uffington House		1881	Margaret Hughes	Uffington, England
The Clubhouse/Ruralia		1884	Daniel Ellerby	
Twin Oaks		1884	Beriah Riddell	
