= Belmont, Anderson County, Tennessee =

Unincorporated community in Tennessee, US

Coordinates: 36°14′44″N 84°01′51″W

Belmont is an unincorporated community in Anderson County, in the U.S. state of Tennessee.

Belmont is derived from the French meaning "beautiful mountain.
