= King Arthur Court, Tennessee =

Residential subdivision in Tennessee, US

Coordinates: 35°59′57″N 84°06′53″W

King Arthur Court is a residential subdivision split between Knox County and Anderson County, Tennessee. It is listed as a populated place in the Geographic Names Information System. There have been past efforts to get the county lines redrawn so the subdivision could be located entirely within Knox County.
