= Clear Fork (Big South Fork Cumberland River tributary) =

River in Tennessee, United States

Coordinates: 36.42424°N 84.62355°W

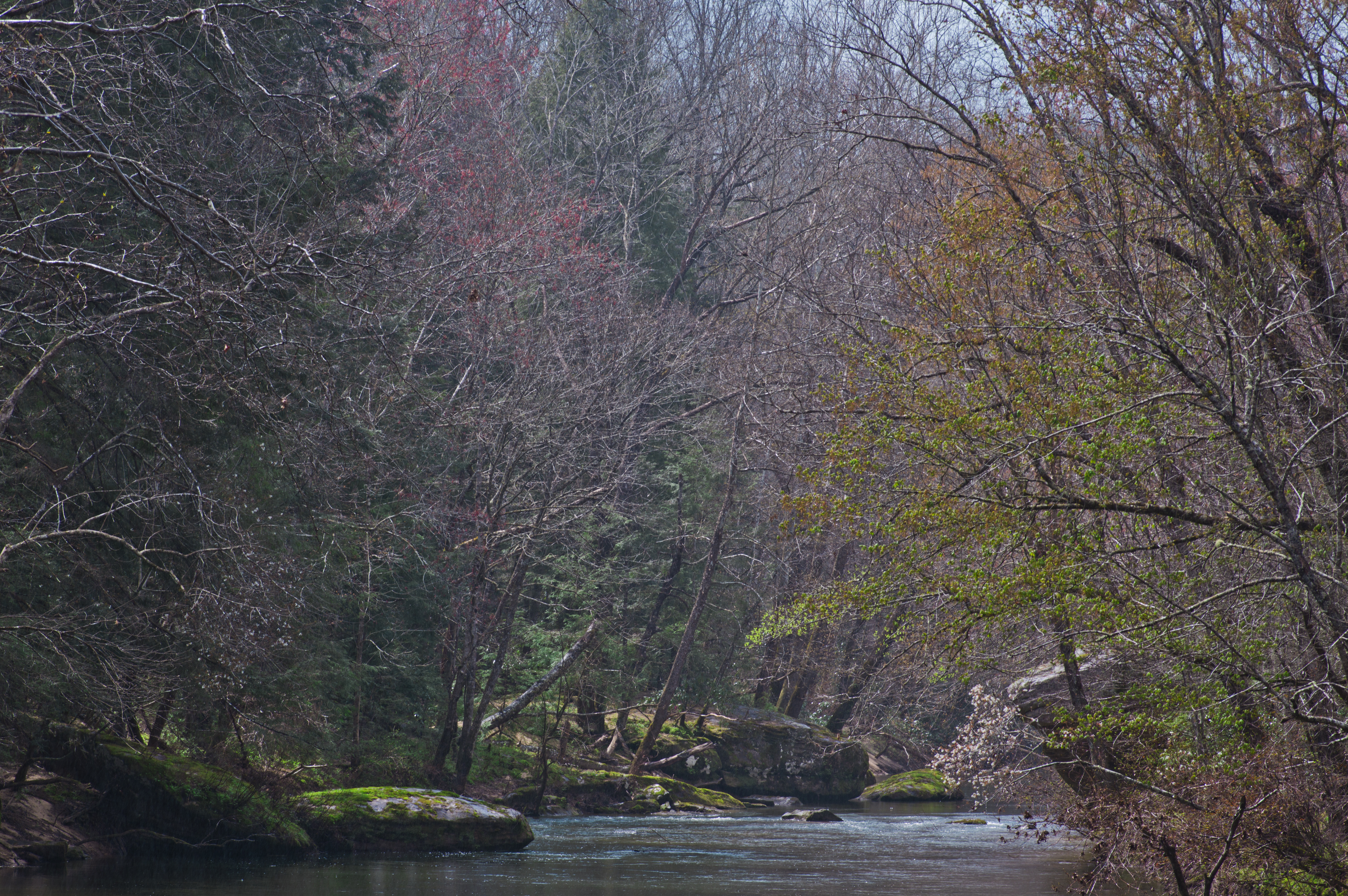
- Early spring view near Peter's Bridge

Location
- Country: US

Physical characteristics
- Source
  - location: Fentress County, Tennessee
- Mouth
  - location: Big South Fork of the Cumberland River in Scott County
  - elevation: 1,004 ft (306 m)
- Length: 27.2 mi (43.8 km)

The Clear Fork (also known as the Clear Fork River or Clear Fork Creek) is a 27.2-mile-long (43.8 km) stream draining part of the Cumberland Plateau of Tennessee, United States. It is a tributary of the Big South Fork of the Cumberland River. By that river, the Cumberland River, and the Ohio River, it is part of the Mississippi River watershed.

The Clear Fork rises on the Cumberland Plateau in southern Fentress County, Tennessee. It is composed of two major components, the North Prong and the South Prong, and numerous smaller tributaries. The North Prong drains an area adjacent to and east of U.S. Highway 127. The South Prong is slightly further east; it and its tributaries form an important portion of the border between Fentress County and Morgan County.

The former English settlement of Rugby, Tennessee, promoted in the late 19th century as a settlement for the "second sons" of English nobility who did not receive hereditary peerages, is located on the Plateau above the Clear Fork valley; swimming in its pools provided the "Rugby Colony" with an important recreational diversion. The stream crosses into Scott County through an oil field developed by the petroleum industry and reaches its confluence with the New River. From this point the combined stream is known as the Big South Fork of the Cumberland River; the upper reaches of the stream are the focal point of a National Recreation Area.

== See also ==
- List of rivers of Tennessee
