= Stainville, Tennessee =

Stainville
- Unincorporated community
- Location within Tennessee Location within the United States
- Coordinates: 36°12′26″N 84°18′51″W
- Country: United States
- State: Tennessee
- County: Anderson
- Elevation: 1,325 ft (404 m)
- Time zone: UTC-5 (Eastern (EST))
  - Summer (DST): UTC-4 (EDT)
- GNIS feature ID: 1314331

Stainville is an unincorporated community in Anderson County, Tennessee. It was also known as Ligias and Ligias Fork. Tennessee State Route 116 passes through the community.
