= J. B. Jones House =

Historic house in Tennessee, United States

- U.S. National Register of Historic Places
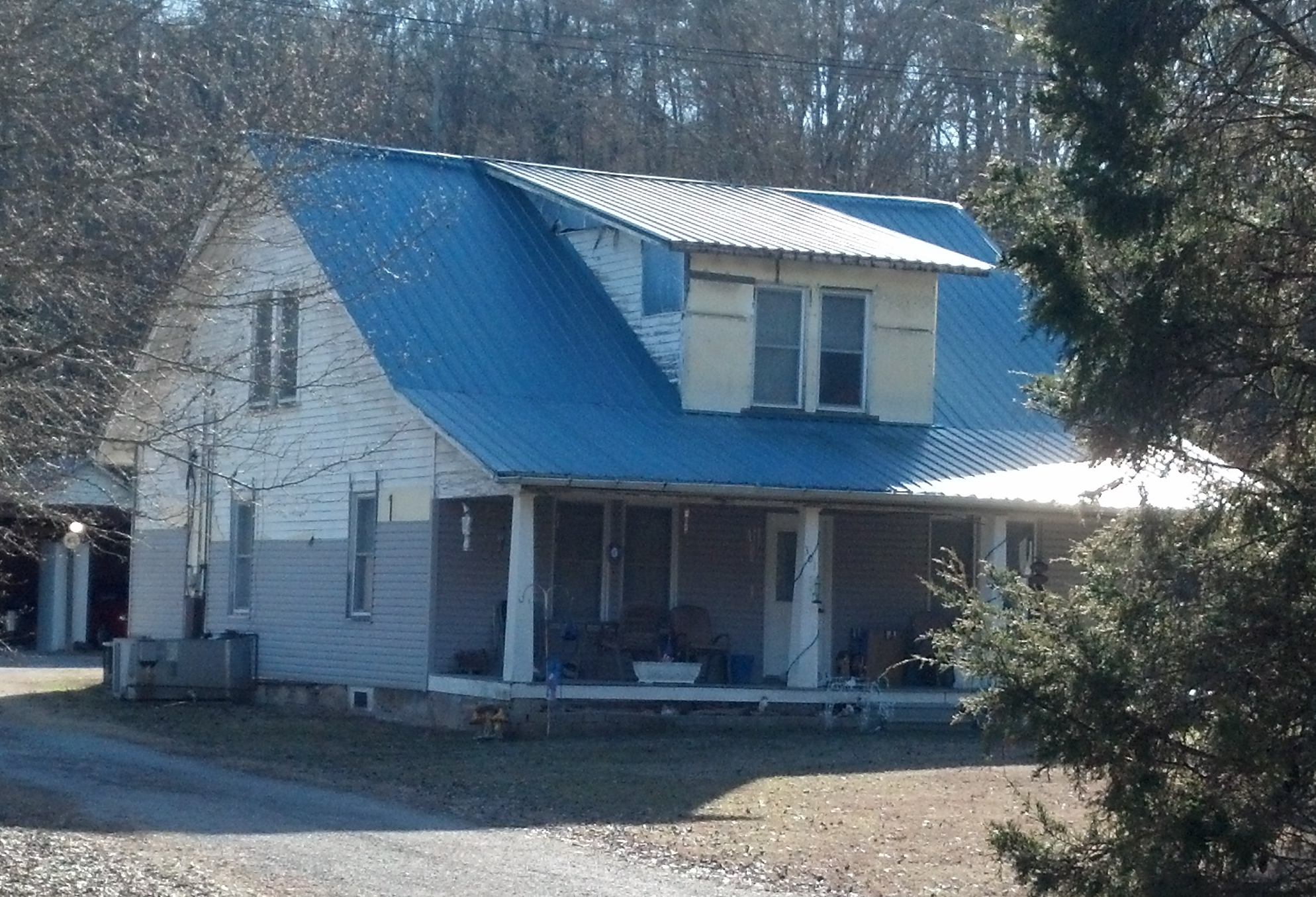

- Location within Tennessee Location within the United States
- Location: Old Edgemoor Rd. between Bethel Valley Rd. and Melton Hill Lake, Oak Ridge, Tennessee
- Coordinates: 36°0′33″N 84°10′9″W
- Area: less than one acre
- MPS: Oak Ridge MPS
- NRHP reference No.: 91001107
- Added to NRHP: September 5, 1991

The J. B. Jones House in Oak Ridge, Tennessee, United States, is a farmhouse that is listed on the National Register of Historic Places as one of the very small number of pre-Manhattan Project residences remaining in the city.

The house is on Old Edgemoor Road near Haw Ridge Park, across the Clinch River from the TVA Bull Run Steam Plant. It is a rectangular frame bungalow structure of one-and-one-half stories, built around 1920. It has a brick foundation, an asphalt-shingled roof, and weatherboard siding.

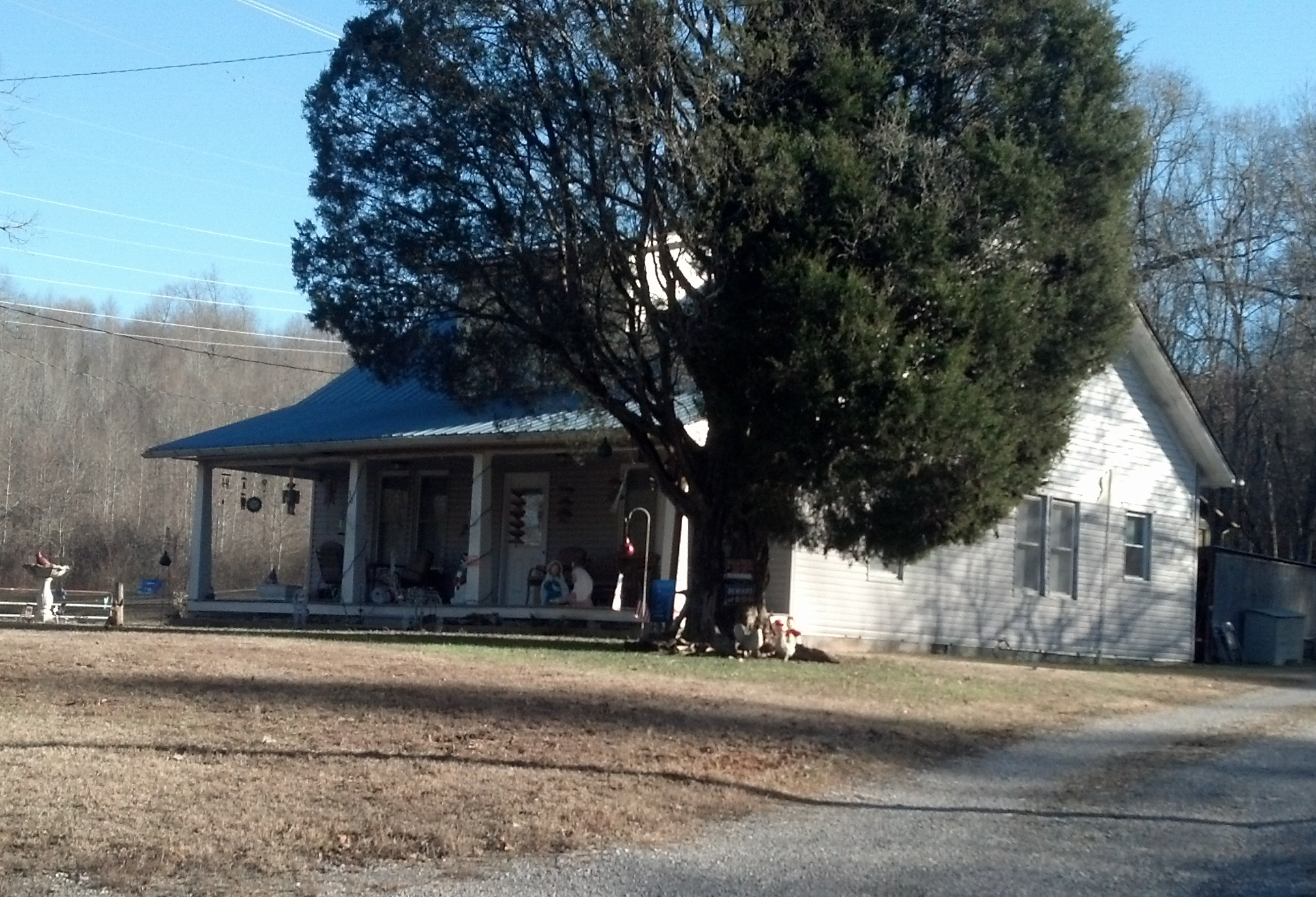

The Jones House was one of 180 pre-World War II houses in Oak Ridge that were used by the U.S. Army during the Manhattan Project. Almost all of these houses were razed in the late 1940s; the Jones House, the Luther Brannon House, and Freels Cabin were the only survivors. The Anderson County Board of Education bought the Jones House from the U.S. Atomic Energy Commission in 1956, when Oak Ridge property first became available for sale. The building and grounds have subsequently been used for a variety of civic purposes. It was listed on the National Register in 1991.
