= Big South Fork of the Cumberland River =

Big South Fork River
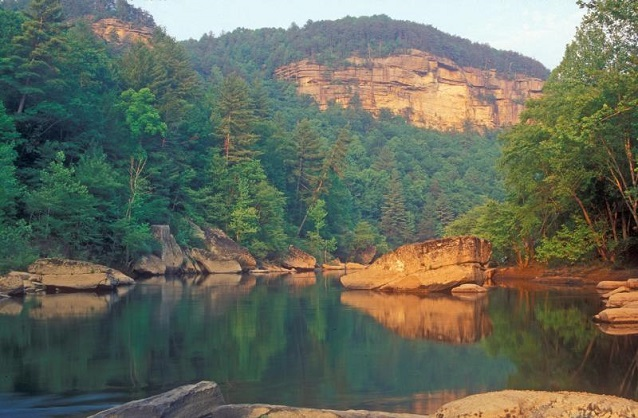

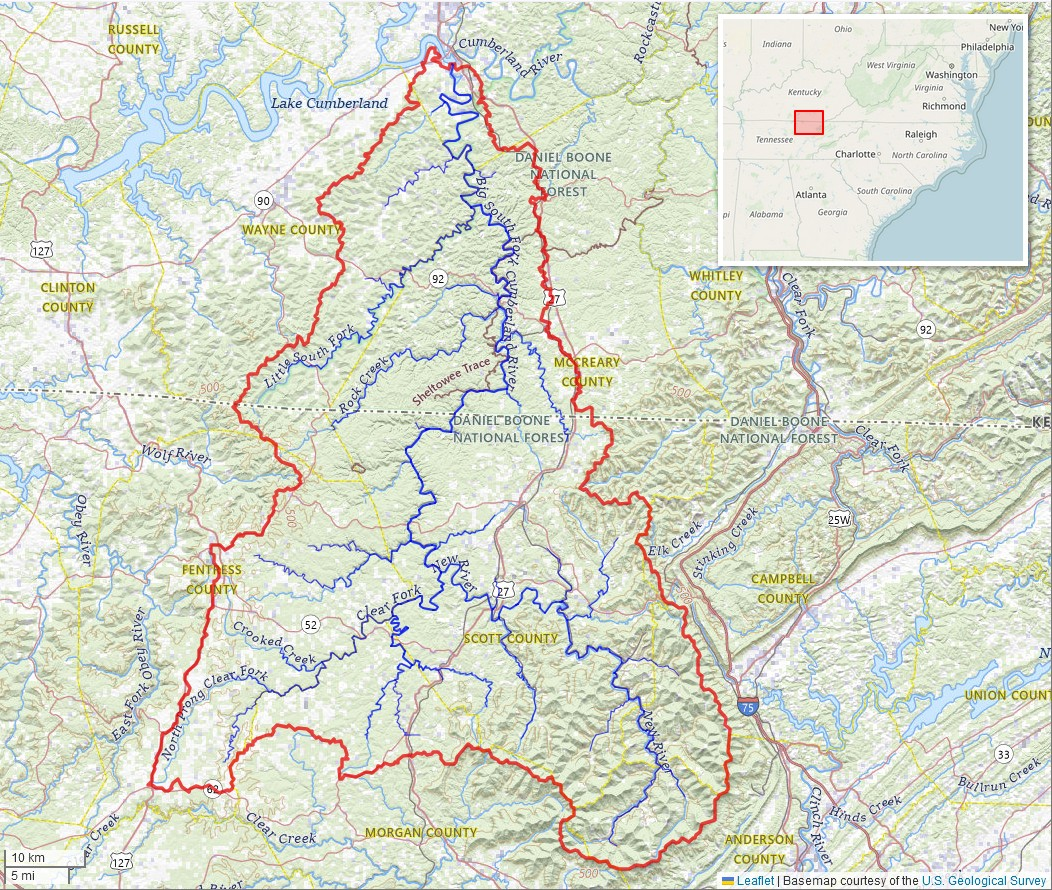
- Big South Fork watershed (Interactive map)

Location
- Country: United States

Physical characteristics
- Source
  - location: Confluence of the New River and the Clear Fork in Scott County, Tennessee.
  - elevation: 1,004 ft (306 m)
- Mouth
  - location: Confluence with the Cumberland River near Burnside, Kentucky
  - coordinates: 36.967083°N 84.605291°W
  - elevation: 722 ft (220 m)
- Length: 76 miles (122 km)
- Basin size: 1,400 square miles (3,600 km^{2})

The Big South Fork of the Cumberland River is a 76-mile-long (122 km) river in the U.S. states of Tennessee and Kentucky. It is a major drainage feature of the Cumberland Plateau, a major tributary of the Cumberland River system, and the major feature of the Big South Fork National River and Recreation Area.

== Physical geography ==
The Big South Fork begins at the confluence of the New River and the Clear Fork in Scott County, Tennessee, (Note: The confluence is located at 36.424302°N 84.623516°W, west of Helenwood, Tennessee.) and flows northwest, northeast, and north until ending at Lake Cumberland in McCreary County, Kentucky, near the town of Burnside. It is the third largest tributary of the Cumberland River, and is free flowing for a distance of approximately 37 miles (60 km) before being affected by the headwaters of the lake.

The terrain furthest upstream near the confluence is the most rugged, with reliefs of as much as 1,900 feet (580 m). This area is characterized by dendritic draining patterns and narrow gorges, with valleys strewn with large boulders fallen from cliffs above. Major formations include natural arches, mesas, chimneys, cracks and rock shelters. The terrain becomes less rugged as the river travels northward, with reliefs of between 200 feet (61 m) and 300 feet (91 m).

Soil in the area is divided between two groups. The first is primarily made up of Ramsey, Hartsells, Grimsley, and Gilpin soils and is located adjacent to the river gorge. The second consists of Hartsells, Lonewood, Ramsey, and Gilpin soils and is found on the nearby plateau.

=== Hydrology ===
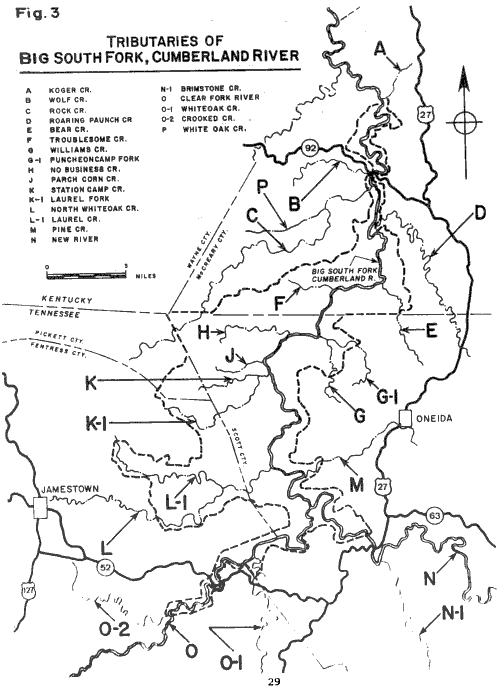
Tributaries of the Big South Fork, Army Corps of Engineers, 1977

The river draws water from a drainage basin of Carboniferous rock in the Cumberland Plateau. Taken together, the Big South Fork and its tributaries drain between 1,123 square miles (2,910 km^{2}) and 1,382 square miles (3,580 km^{2}), of which about 17% is covered by the associated National Recreation Area.

The maximum recorded water flow on the Big South Fork was 93,200 cu ft/s (2,640 m^{3}/s), the minimum recorded was 11 cu ft/s (0.31 m^{3}/s), and the river averages a flow of 1,760 cu ft/s (50 m^{3}/s). (Note: These measurements were taken at a gauging station near Stearns, Kentucky.) Around half of the Big South Fork's annual streamflow occurs during the months of January through March, and the lowest streamflow typically occurs during September and October.

Along the river basin, water drops from a maximum original elevation of 1,250 feet (380 m) above sea level at Peter's Bridge on the Clear Fork, to 723 feet (220 m) where the waters meet the Cumberland. Between the confluence of the New River and Clear Fork, and Leatherwood Ford (Note: Located at 36.477218°N 84.668996°W) the river has an average gradient across 6.2 miles (10.0 km) of 20 feet per mile (fpm), and a maximum gradient of 40 fpm.

Major tributaries of the Big South Fork include:

- New River
- Clear Fork River
- North Whiteoak Creek
- Pine Creek
- Station Camp Creek
- Parch Corn Creek
- No Business Creek
- Williams Creek
- Troublesome Creek
- Bear Creek
- Roaring Paunch Creek
- Rock Creek
- Wolf Creek
- Kogar Creek

Water quality is generally good, but may be negatively affected by mine drainage, logging, poor road quality, and ground disturbances. The river contains about two times as much suspended and dissolved solids at a comparable river basin which does not have a history of mining. Both Tennessee and Kentucky have designated their respective portions of the Big South Fork as Outstanding National Resource Waters, and cleanup and reclamation efforts by a number of organizations have been made.

== History ==
It is likely that the area surrounding the Big South Fork was frequented by Paleo-Indians, which continued up until early colonial times, although it is not clear that the area was permanently inhabited by prehistoric peoples. No intensive surveys of archaeological sites had been conducted as of 1977, when the Army Corps of Engineers published their comprehensive study of the area, although one study from the University of Tennessee along with one inter-agency governmental report had identified 21 total sites. (Note: 16 sites in Scott County, Tennessee, four sites in Fentress County, Tennessee, and one site in McCreary County, Kentucky) A 2005 report by the National Park Service however estimated a total of 10,000 archaeological sites, evenly split between pre and post European contact.

The first permanent European settlement was likely in 1769 in modern-day Wayne County, Kentucky. By 1798, the Treaty of Tellico had officially expelled the native Cherokee peoples from the river basin, although the land, which was not well suited to agriculture, was mostly passed over by settlers until the founding of the ultimately failed colony of Rugby, Tennessee, by Thomas Hughes in the 1880s.

=== Blue Heron ===
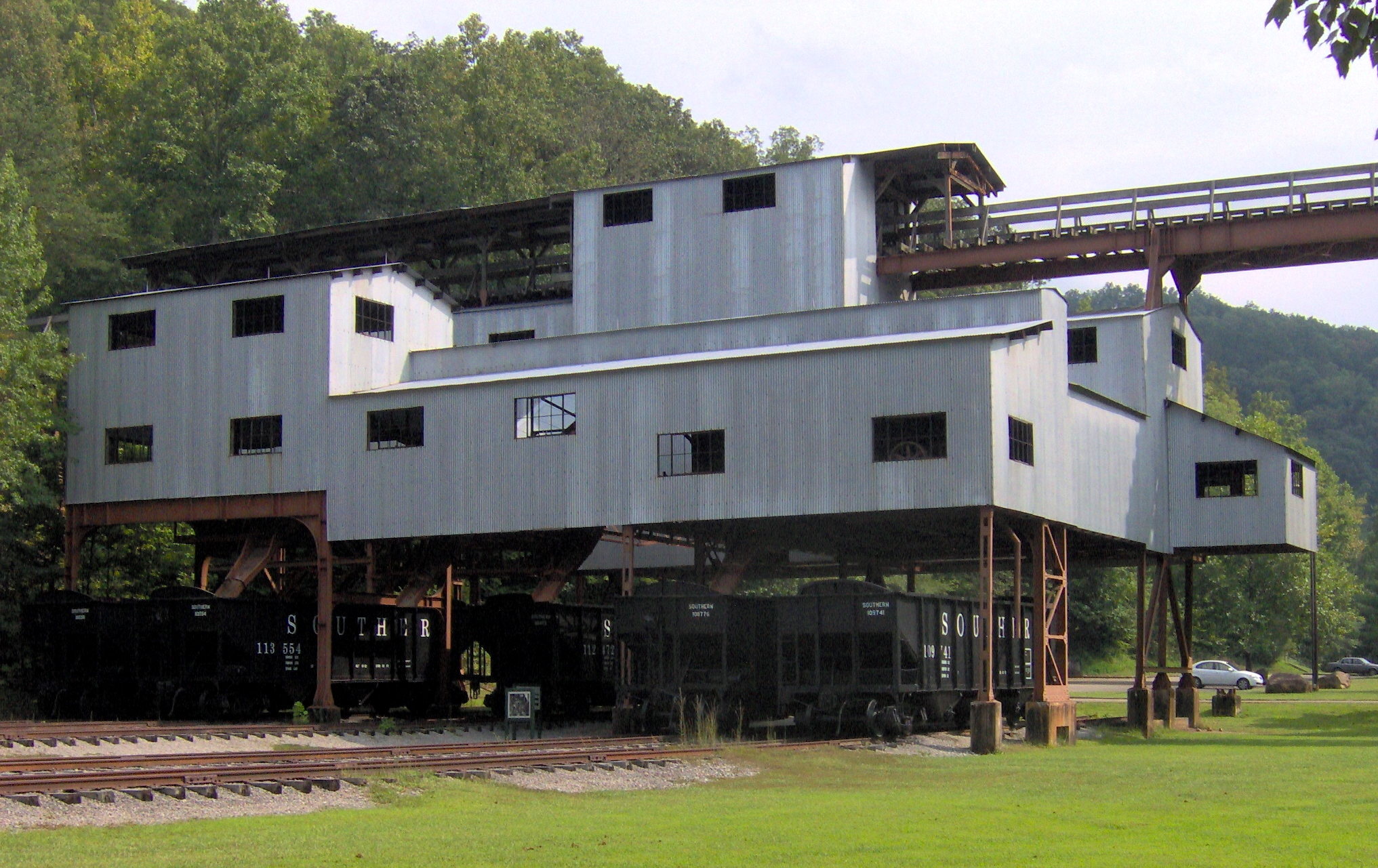
Coal tipple at Blue Heron, 2009

The mining community of modern-day Blue Heron, Kentucky, was established in 1937 along the banks of the Big South Fork, and operated until 1962 when it was abandoned by the Stearns Coal and Lumber Company. (Note: The site is located at 36.6714661°N 84.5454949°W in McCreary County, Kentucky.) The site was later recreated in the 1980s and reopened as an outdoor museum.

=== National River and Recreation Area ===
The Big South Fork National River and Recreation Area was established by the United States Congress as part of the Water Resources Development Act of 1974. According to the text of the act, the purpose of the establishment was for:

conserving and interpreting an area containing unique cultural, historic, geologic, fish and wildlife, archeologic, scenic, and recreational values, preserving as a natural, free-flowing stream the Big South Fork of the Cumberland River, major portions of its Clear Fork and New River stems, and portions of their various tributaries for the benefit and enjoyment of present and future generations, the preservation of the natural integrity of the scenic gorges and valleys, and the development of the area’s potential for healthful outdoor recreation.

The legislation granted authority for land acquisition to the Army Corps of Engineers, and for managing the area to the United States Secretary of the Interior once established. Congress authorized final transfer of the land to the National Park Service (Note: A bureau of the Department of the Interior) in 1990, and the official dedication of the park occurred on August 25, 1991.

== Ecology ==
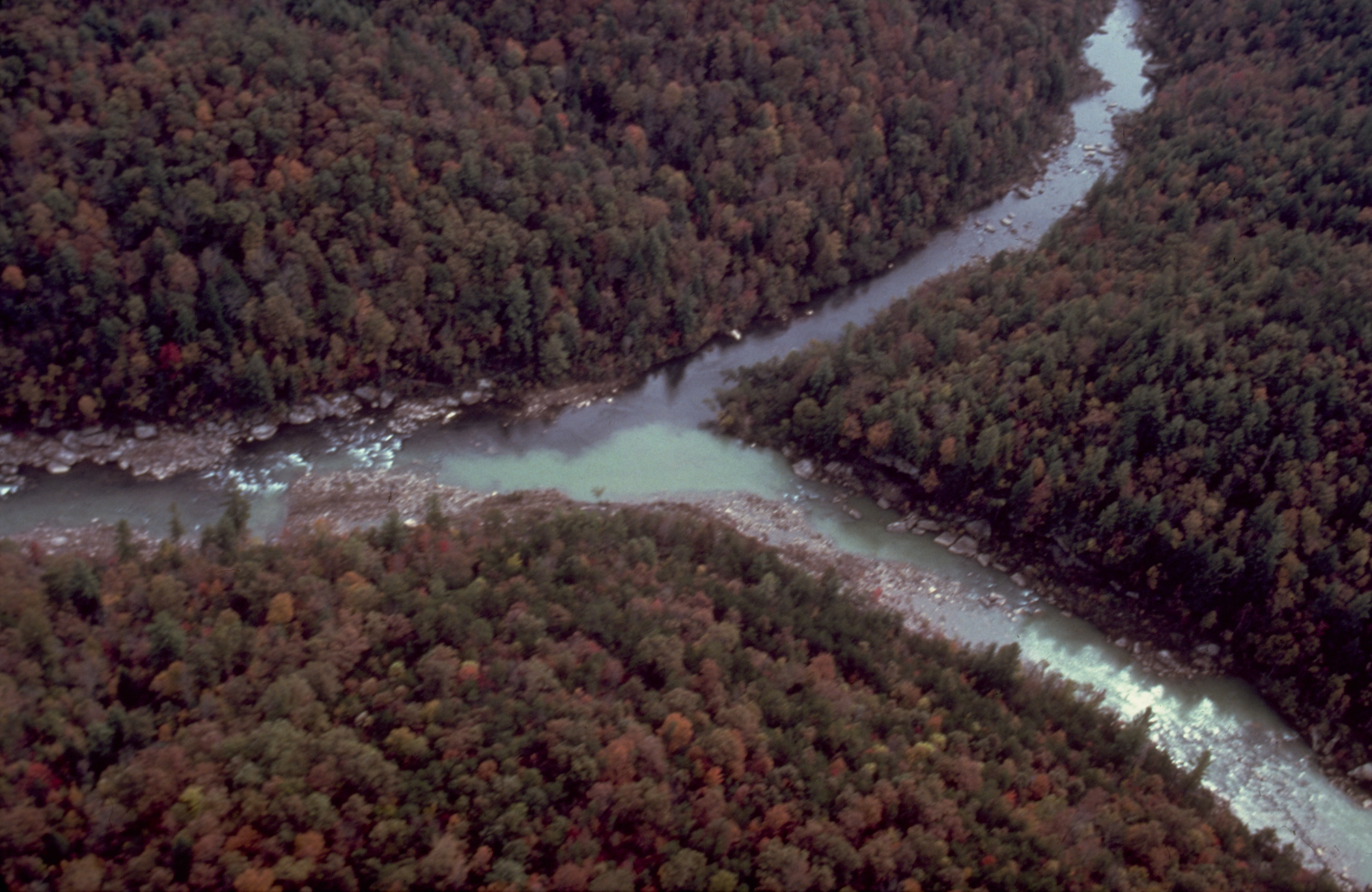
Areal view of the confluence of the New River and the Clear Fork

The Big South Fork and its watershed is home to a large variety of plant and animal species, and has likely been continuously vegetated since before the last glacial period, ending approximately 10,000 to 12,000 years ago. Habitats range from floodplains, to coves, as well as ravines, moist slopes, and sandstone caprock. The area is home to between 68 and 81 species of fish, 23 species of mussels, and up to 215 individual taxa of macro invertebrates.

=== Animal life ===
Fish species include Ictalurus punctatus (channel catfish), Stizostedion vitreum (walleye), Esox masquinongy (muskellunge), Morone chrysops (white bass), Ambloplites rupestris (rock bass), and Lepomis megalotis (longear sunfish).

The availability of “seeds, berries, nuts, buds, flowers, fleshy roots and twigs” encourages the presence of species such as the Bonasa umbellus (ruffed grouse), Meleagris gallopavo (turkey), Sciurus carolinensis (eastern gray squirrel). Food available in canopy vegetation supports Vireo olivaceus (red-eyed vireo), Wilsonia citrina (hooded warbler), Setophaga ruticilla (American redstart), Sorex fumeus (smoky shrew), Scalopus aquaticus (eastern mole), Neotoma floridana (eastern woodrat), and Peromyscus leucopus (white-footed mouse). These species in turn provide food for predatory birds such as Strix varia (barred owl) and Buteo lineatus (red-shouldered hawk).

During the 1990s, 14 adult female and 16 black bear cubs were reintroduced to the river basin, relocated from the Great Smoky Mountains National Park. As of 2013, genetic analysis estimated the bear population in the area to be at 245.

=== Plant life ===
The plant life along the river and in the surrounding basin can be divided into plateau and ravine communities consisting of mixed oak forests along with areas of mixed mesophytic vegetation. Forests of sugar maple, along with beech and yellow birch are found in low moist slopes, and Tsuga canadensis (Canadian hemlock) along with undergrowth of Rhododendron maximum grow in coves along streams. Communities of various species of pine may also be found.

As the result of logging in the mid-20th century, most of the areas consists of 2nd or 3rd growth forest.

== Whitewater ==
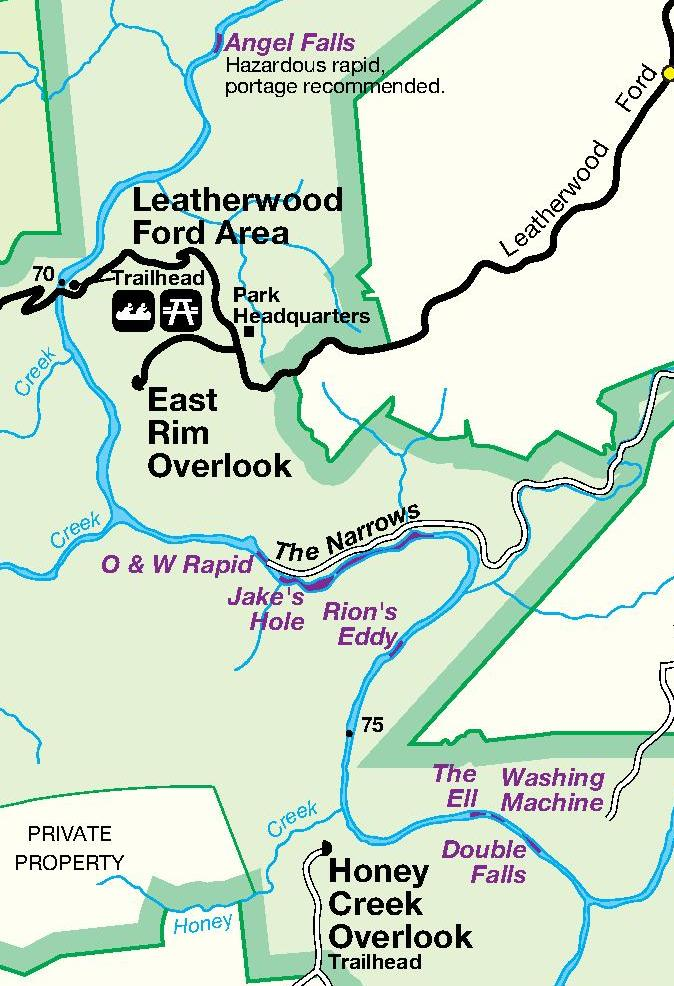
Excerpt from an NPS map, showing the confluence (bottom right), rapids up to Leatherwood Ford, and Angel Falls downstream (northward) (Note: The original full scale map may be found here.)

Whitewater rafting and kayaking occur on the Big South Fork mostly in the Spring season. Available runs range in distance from 4.8 miles (7.7 km) to 27 miles (43 km), and vary in difficulty between classes I and IV according to the international scale of river difficulty. The most popular runs are those upstream from Leatherwood Ford, ranging from 8.5 miles (13.7 km) to 15.5 miles (24.9 km) in distance and between class I and IV in difficulty depending on put-in. (Note: Distance and difficulty per put in is as follows: Zenith Mine to Leatherwood Ford Bridge, 8.5 miles (13.7 km), class II; Burnt Mill Bridge to Leatherwood Ford, 11.5 miles (18.5 km), class III-IV; New River Bridge to Leatherwood Ford, 15.5 miles (24.9 km), class I-IV) The minimum water flow recommended by the National Park Service for rafting is 800 cfs, with a maximum flow of 10,000 cfs for safe rafting.

Moving downstream from the confluence to Lake Cumberland, named rapids according to the National Park Service are:

1. Double Falls
2. Washing Machine
3. The Ell
4. Rion's Eddy
5. Jake's Hold
6. O&W Rapid
7. Angel Falls (Note: Hazardous rapid, portage recommended)
8. Big Shoals
9. Devil's Jump (Note: Hazardous rapid)

== See also ==
- Cumberland Falls, located on the border of McCreary and Whitley County in Kentucky
- Daniel Boone National Forest, covering parts of 21 Kentucky counties
- List of areas in the United States National Park System
- List of rivers of Kentucky
- List of rivers of Tennessee
- Yahoo Falls, located in the National Recreation Area, and which flows into the Big South Fork
