= Beech Grove, Anderson County, Tennessee =

Unincorporated community in Tennessee, US

Coordinates: 36°14′04″N 84°11′24″W

Beech Grove is an unincorporated community in Anderson County, Tennessee, in the United States.

== History ==
The community was named from the presence of beech trees near the town site.
