= Buffalo, Anderson County, Tennessee =

Buffalo
- Unincorporated community
- Location within Tennessee Location within the United States
- Coordinates: 36°08′13″N 84°23′15″W
- Country: United States
- State: Tennessee
- County: Anderson
- Elevation: 1,434 ft (437 m)
- Time zone: UTC-5 (Eastern (EST))
  - Summer (DST): UTC-4 (EDT)
- Area code: 865
- GNIS feature ID: 1278899

Buffalo is an unincorporated community in Anderson County, Tennessee.
