= Luther Brannon House =

Historic house in Tennessee, United States

- Formerly listed on the U.S. National Register of Historic Places
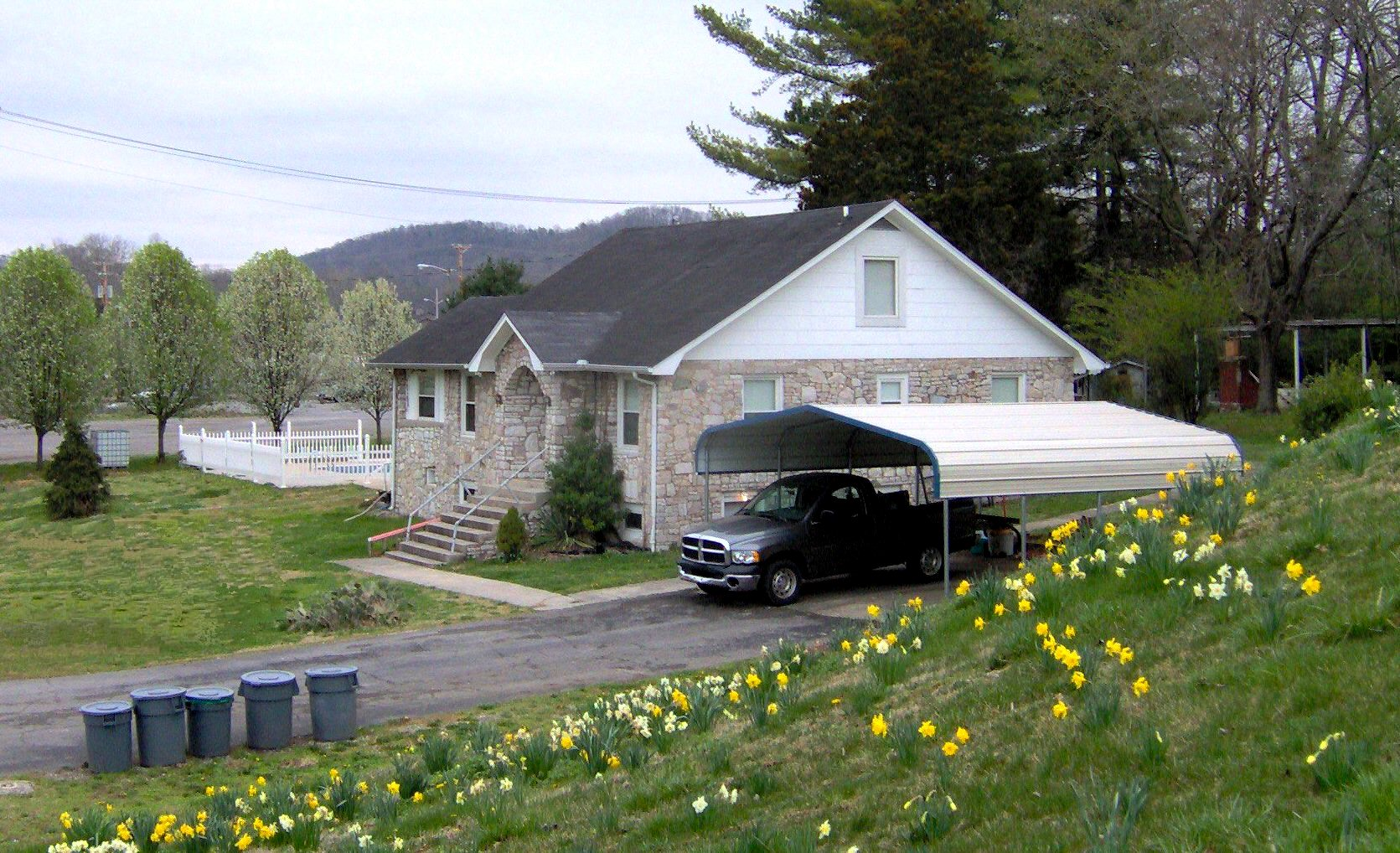
- The Luther Brannon House in 2008

- Location within Tennessee Location within the United States
- Location: 151 Oak Ridge Tpk., Oak Ridge, Tennessee
- Coordinates: 36°2′40″N 84°12′34″W
- Built: 1942
- Architectural style: Bungalow/Craftsman
- MPS: Oak Ridge MPS
- NRHP reference No.: 91001108

Significant dates
- Added to NRHP: September 05, 1991
- Removed from NRHP: October 28, 2021

The Luther Brannon House was a stone bungalow structure at 151 Oak Ridge Turnpike in Oak Ridge, Tennessee, United States, where it was one of the few buildings remaining from before World War II.

The house was built in 1941 by Owen Hackworth and just months later was acquired by the U.S. Army for the Manhattan Project. It was one of about 180 existing structures that were spared from demolition after the area was acquired for Manhattan Project production activities. The house is believed to have been used as headquarters for local project operations and living quarters for General Leslie Groves until the Army completed construction of new administration buildings.

After the war, when most other remaining pre-war structures in Oak Ridge were torn down, the house was left standing. As of 1991, it was one of only three pre-World War II houses remaining in Oak Ridge, the others being Freels Cabin and the J. B. Jones House. It was listed on the National Register of Historic Places due to its association with General Groves and the early development of Oak Ridge.

The house suffered significant damage from a fire in July 2014 and was demolished in 2021.
