= Fork Mountain, Tennessee =

Fork Mountain
- Unincorporated area
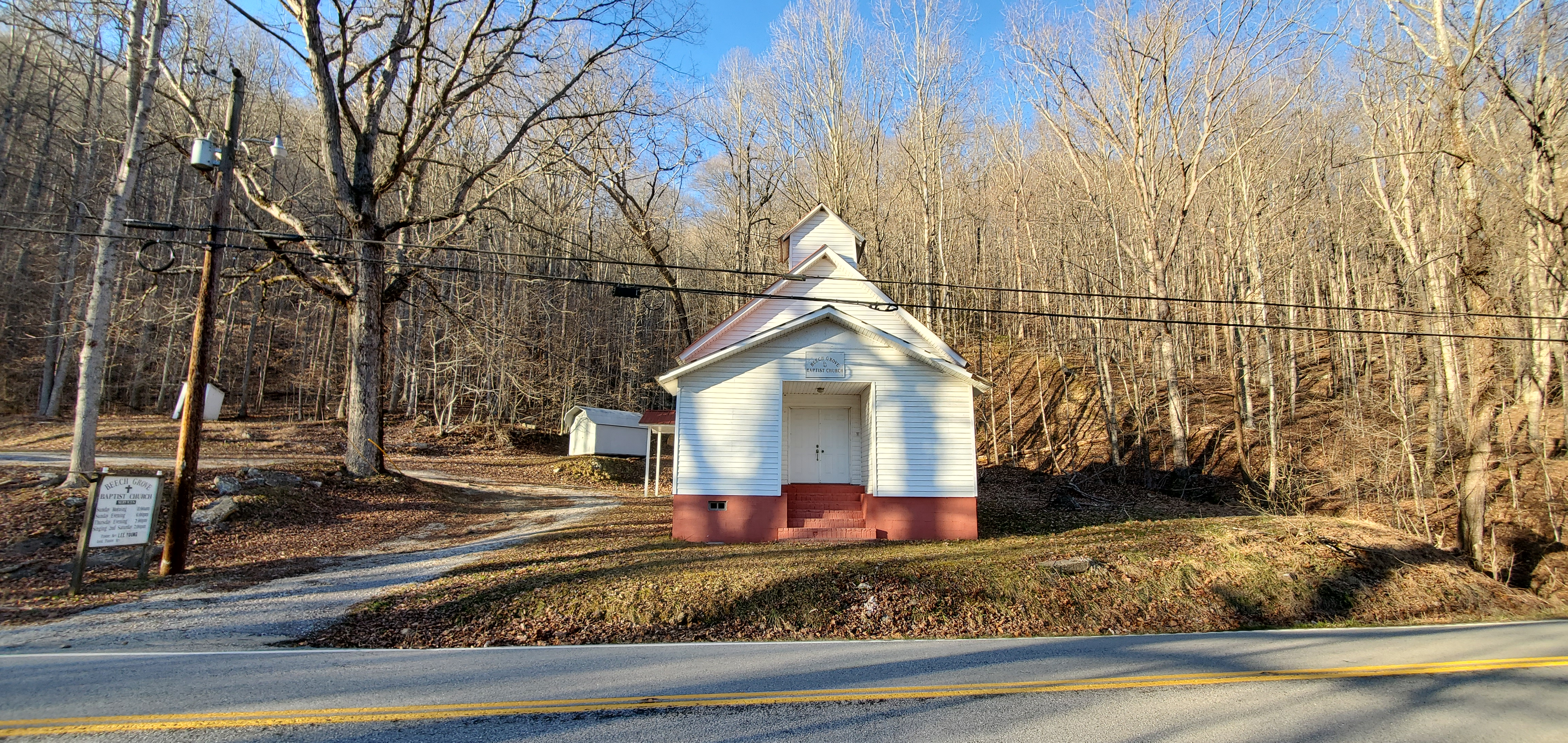
- Beech Grove Baptist Church

- Location within the state of Tennessee
- Coordinates: 36°07′36″N 84°25′12″W
- Country: United States
- State: Tennessee
- County: Anderson
- Time zone: UTC-5 (Eastern (EST))
  - Summer (DST): UTC-4 (EDT)

Fork Mountain, Tennessee, is a former coal mining camp, located on Tennessee State Route 116 and the New River, at the Morgan County-Anderson County line. Petros is 4.2 miles to the south. Frozen Head State Park is nearby with the park boundary including part of the Morgan County portion of the old town. The town was the site of at least six underground mines, a school, a railroad siding, and a sizable population in the early 1950s, but by 1980 these had all been dismantled as were most of the homes in the town. Fork Mountain was served by the Devonia post office, which was established in 1920 and closed in 1975. Fork Mountain is also the birthplace of Ohio State Senator Bill Harris.
