= Oak Ridge gatehouses =

Historic security checkpoints in Oak Ridge, TN, US

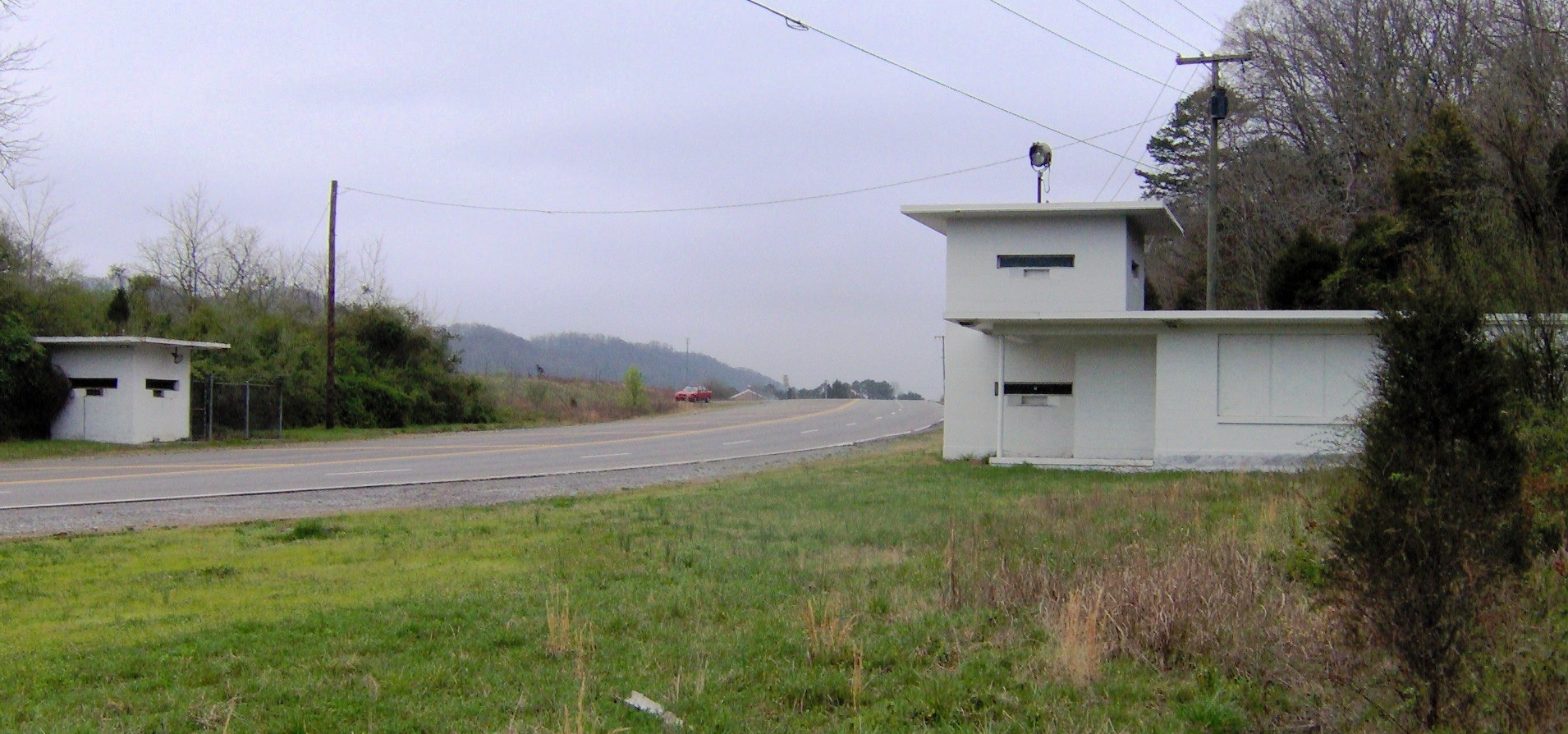
Bethel Valley Road gatehouse, intended to control access to the Oak Ridge National Laboratory (X-10) site

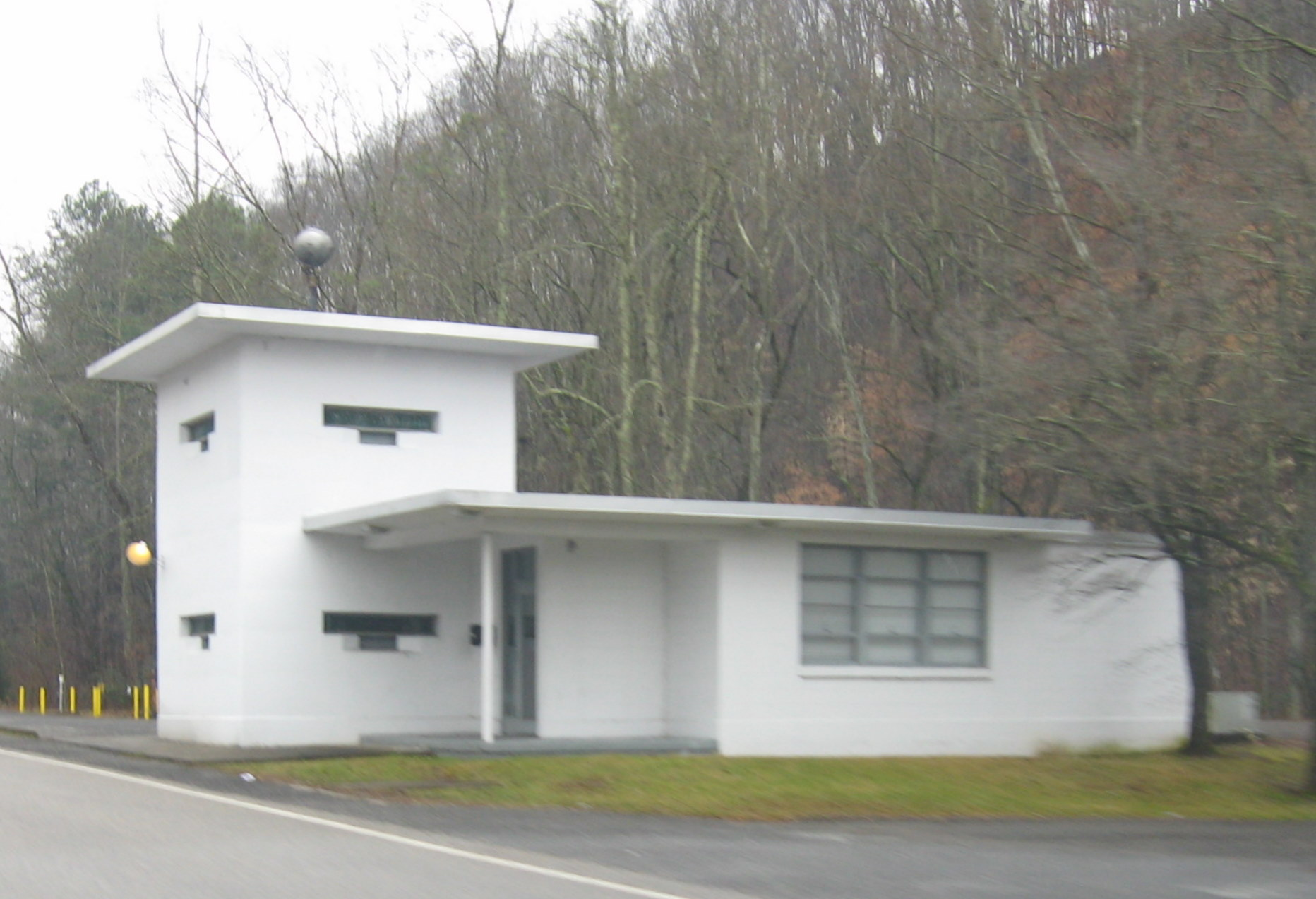
Gatehouse on Scarboro Road north of Bear Creek Road, intended to control access to the Y-12 plant

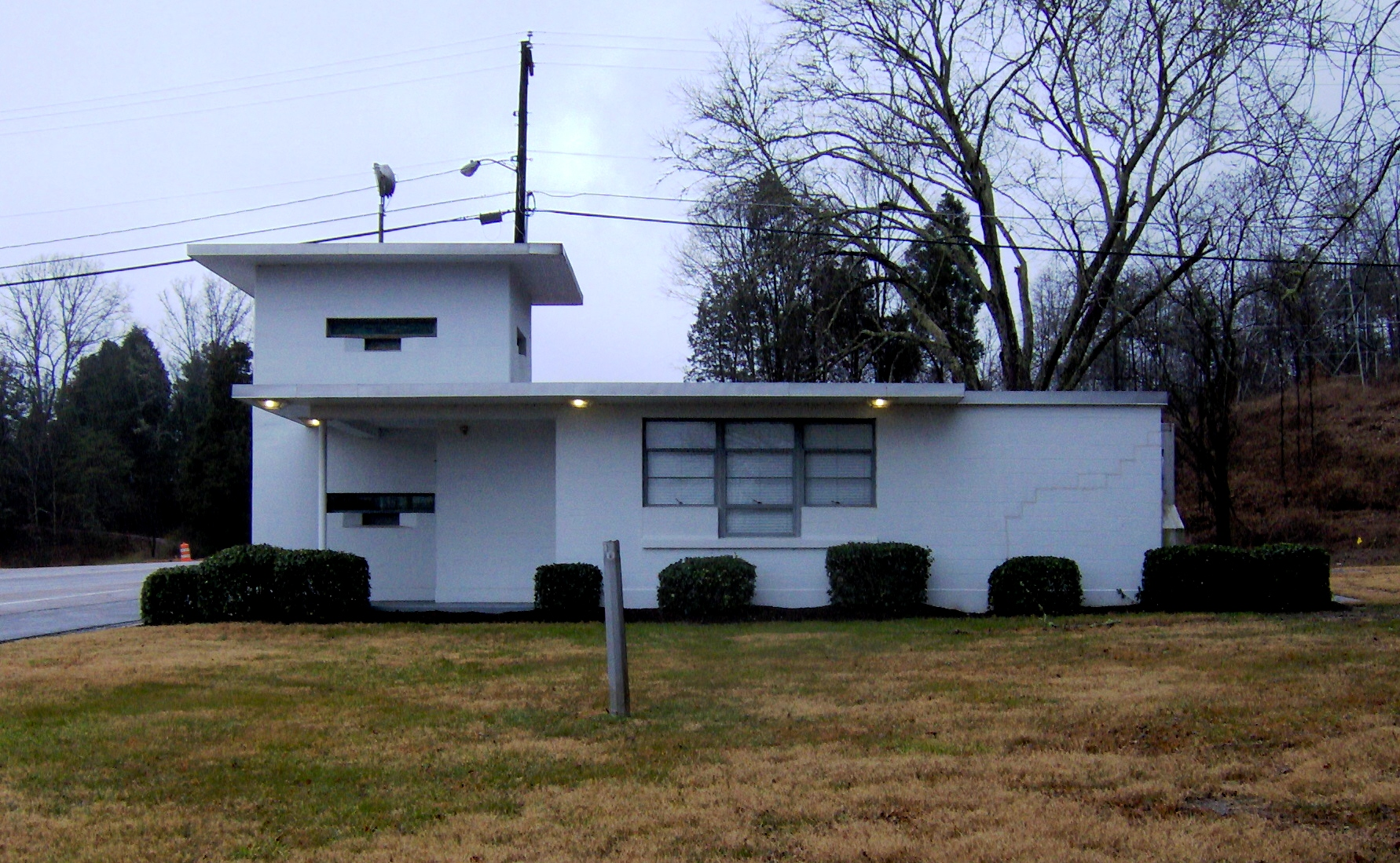
Gatehouse on Oak Ridge Turnpike on west side of Oak Ridge, intended to control access to the K-25 Site

The three Oak Ridge gatehouses, also known as "checking stations", "guard houses", or "guard shacks", are security checkpoints in Oak Ridge, Tennessee, built c. 1948-1949 to control access to the Atomic Energy Commission (AEC) production and research facilities in Oak Ridge. These are individually listed on the U.S. National Register of Historic Places as Bear Creek Road Checking Station, Bethel Valley Road Checking Station and Oak Ridge Turnpike Checking Station.

== History ==
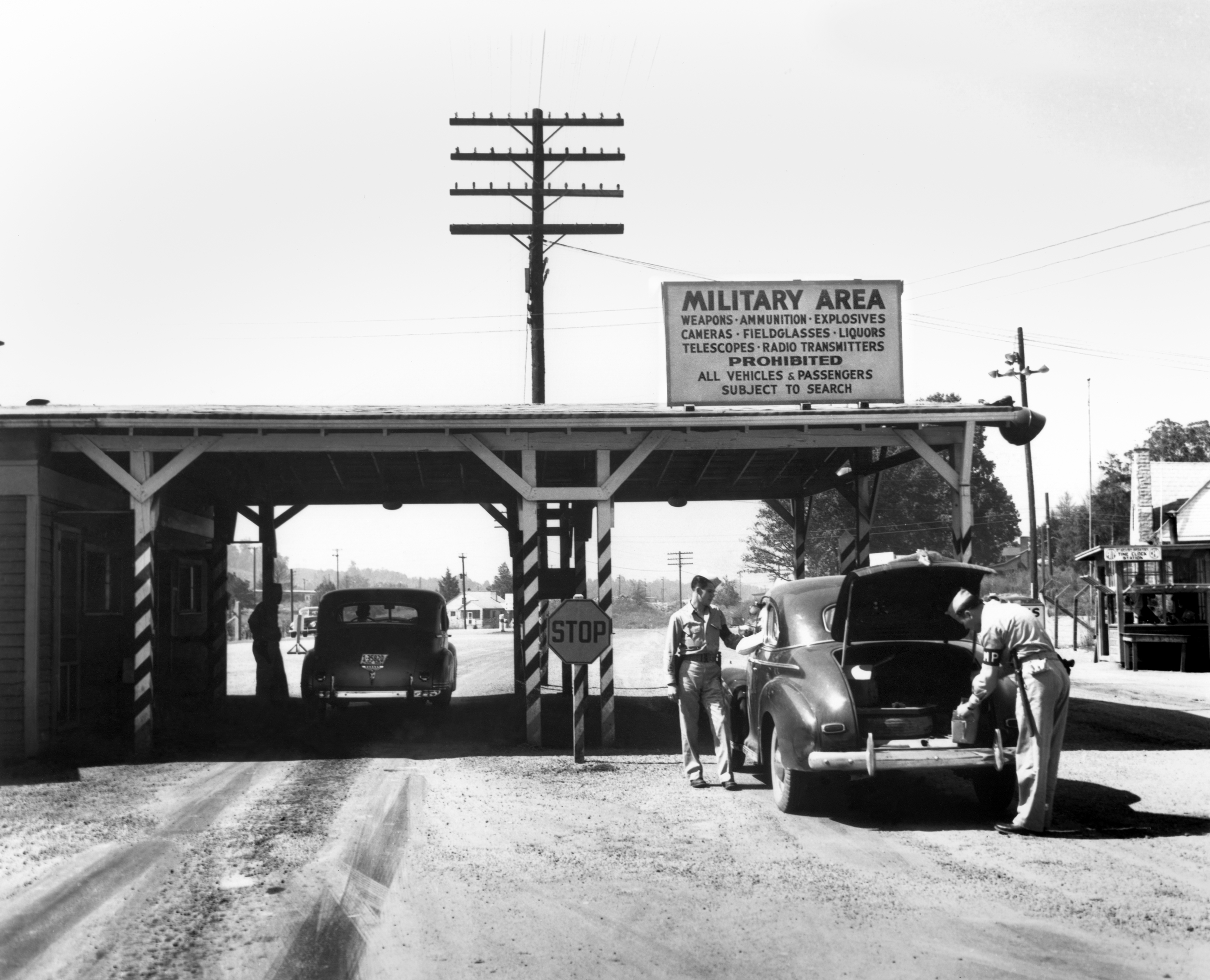
One of the World War II security gates used when access to the entire city was restricted.

The three gatehouses were built c. 1948-1949 and went into service on March 19, 1949, when the residential and commercial portion of Oak Ridge, known as the "townsite," was opened to public access. During World War II and until 1949, the entire Oak Ridge area had been enclosed by a fence and was restricted. Access was controlled at seven security gates equipped with wooden guardhouses. In 1949, access restrictions on the Oak Ridge townsite were eliminated. At that time, the three checking stations went into use to control access between the townsite and the AEC facilities. A station on Bethel Valley Road controlled access to the "X-10" site in Bethel Valley, where Oak Ridge National Laboratory is located; a station on Scarboro Road near Bear Creek Road controlled access to the Y-12 nuclear weapons production facility in Bear Creek Valley; and a station on Oak Ridge Turnpike (now part of Tennessee State Route 95) controlled access to the K-25 site uranium enrichment facility near the Clinch River in western Oak Ridge.

The structures were used for their intended purpose until 1953 when the gates to each of the three government sites were relocated to the specific sites. The gatehouses remained in federal government ownership for many years but stood vacant. In 1992, they were listed on the National Register as three separate properties, identified as the Oak Ridge Turnpike Checking Station, Bear Creek Road Checking Station, and Bethel Valley Road Checking Station. All three were included in a larger Multiple Property Submission for Oak Ridge-related properties. In 1999, the Department of Energy (DOE)—the AEC successor agency that currently controls the Bear Creek Road and Oak Ridge Turnpike properties, as well as the small structure on the Bethel Valley property—restored the large structures at the checking stations at the Oak Ridge Turnpike and Bear Creek Road sites. The large structure at the Bethel Valley Road site belongs to Lockheed Martin who obtained it with the Commerce Park property in 1984 when Martin Marietta took over the managing and operating contract for the three DOE sites in Oak Ridge as well as the Portsmouth Gaseous Diffusion Plant in Portsmouth, Ohio, and the Paducah Gaseous Diffusion Plant in Paducah, Kentucky. The Bethel Valley Road large structure was painted in 2005, but there has been no restoration or other attention to the interiors of the two Bethel Valley structures and the small structures at the other sites.

== Design and uses ==
Design of the checking stations was identical. Each one consists of two concrete block buildings: a single-story main building with a two-story guard tower at one corner and a smaller one-story guard house across the street. Gun portals are visible on both buildings in each pair, and the windows on both buildings are protected by bulletproof glass. Military police controlled a metal gate that extended between the pair of buildings. Workers and visitors had to show special badges to the guards in order to pass through the gates.

The two restored gatehouses are now fitted with period and replica furniture from the 1940s and 1950s and decorated with historic photographs by Ed Westcott. They are used as meeting rooms and for educational, cultural, and civic activities sponsored by DOE.
