= Braytown, Tennessee =

Unincorporated community in Tennessee, US

Coordinates: 36.1581°N 84.3733°W

Braytown is an unincorporated community in Anderson County, in the U.S. state of Tennessee.

== History ==
The community was named for the Bray family, who settled there in the early 19th century or earlier.
