= New River (Tennessee) =

River in Tennessee, United States

Location
- Country: United States

Physical characteristics
- Source
  - location: Frozen Head in Morgan County, Tennessee
- Mouth
  - location: Big South Fork of the Cumberland River in Scott County
  - coordinates: 36.985077°N 84.606885°W
  - elevation: 1,004 ft (306 m)

The New River is a 58.7-mile-long (94.5 km) tributary of the Big South Fork of the Cumberland River in the U.S. state of Tennessee. Via the Big South Fork and the Cumberland and Ohio rivers, it is part of the Mississippi River watershed.

The New River rises on Frozen Head, a notable mountain of Morgan County, Tennessee. Named for its frequent winter appearance, Frozen Head is the focal point of Frozen Head State Park and Natural Area. Draining an area of Pennsylvanian Period rock that has been subjected to extensive strip mining for coal, the upper reaches of the stream have at times been subject to heavy pollution. The stream initially trends northeast. The upper portion of the course is paralleled by State Route 116. It soon crosses into a remote area of Anderson County, and then into Campbell County. At this juncture, State Route 116 turns to the southeast to follow the Ligias Fork, and the road paralleling the New River becomes a small county road. The stream trends generally north from this point for several miles, and is also paralleled by a railroad constructed primarily for the purposes of coal transport.

The stream, road, and railroad cross into Scott County. Several miles into Scott County, the stream begins a westerly trend. It drains an area developed by the petroleum industry as an oil field, and is crossed by U.S. Highway 27 at the community of New River. Just downstream of this community is the boundary of the Big South Fork National Recreational Area. The New River is joined slightly downstream of this point by the Clear Fork, and the stream downstream from this point is known as the Big South Fork of the Cumberland River.

== See also ==
- List of rivers of Tennessee
