= Anderson County, Tennessee =

County in Tennessee, United States

- County
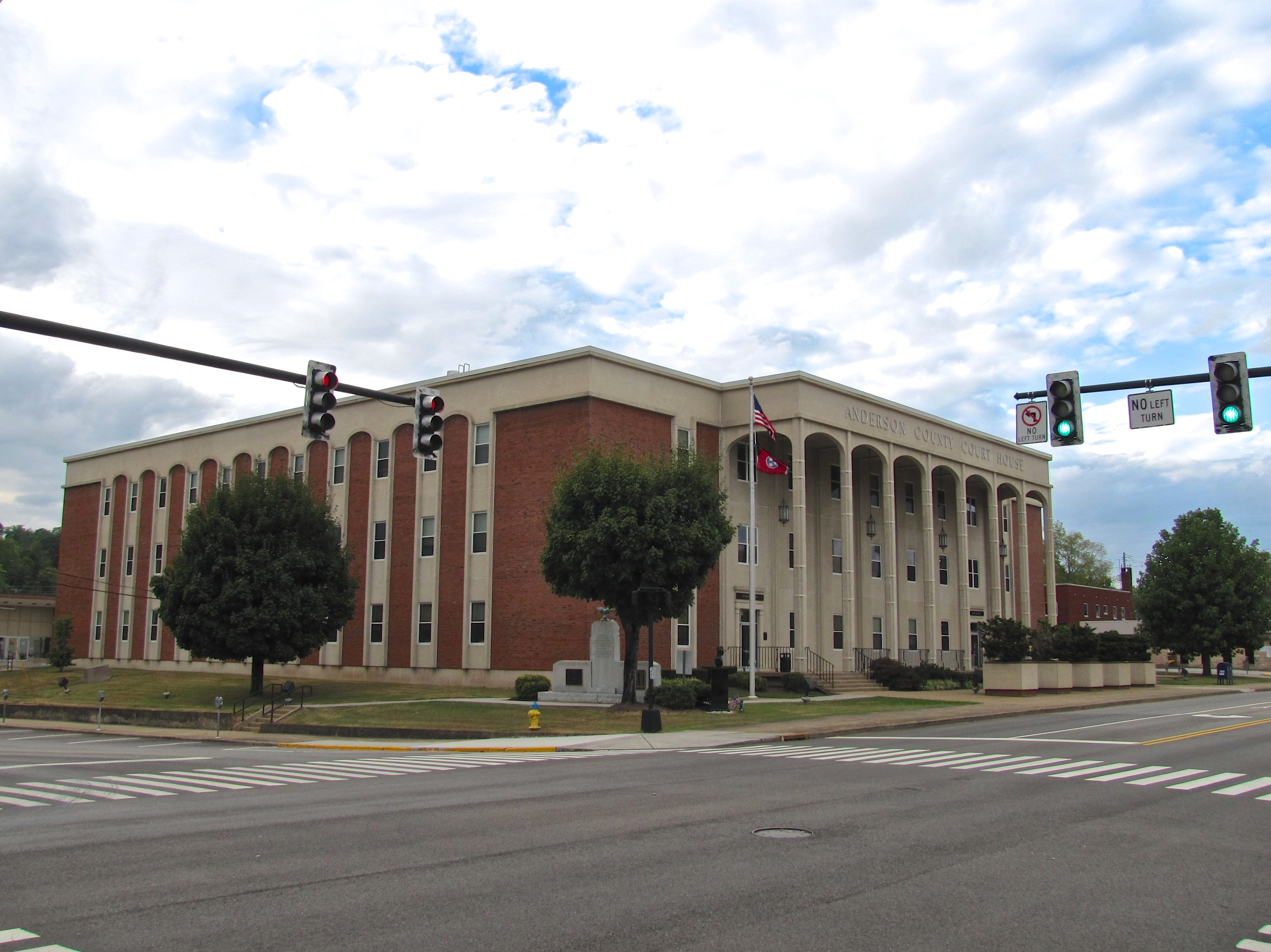
- Anderson County Courthouse in Clinton

- Seal

- Location within the U.S. state of Tennessee
- Coordinates: 36°07′N 84°12′W
- Country: United States
- State: Tennessee
- Founded: November 6, 1801
- Named for: Joseph Anderson
- Seat: Clinton
- Largest city: Oak Ridge

Government
  - Mayor: Terry Frank (R)

Area
  - Total: 345 sq mi (890 km^{2})
  - Land: 337 sq mi (870 km^{2})
  - Water: 7.6 sq mi (20 km^{2}) 2.2%

Population (2020)
  - Total: 77,123
  - Estimate (2025): 82,066 ▲
  - Density: 229/sq mi (88.4/km^{2})
- Time zone: UTC−5 (Eastern)
  - Summer (DST): UTC−4 (EDT)
- Congressional district: 3rd
- Website: andersoncountytn.gov

Anderson County is a county in the U.S. state of Tennessee. It is located in the northern part of the state in East Tennessee. As of the 2020 census, its population was 77,123. Its county seat is Clinton. Anderson County is included in the Knoxville, TN Metropolitan Statistical Area.

== History ==
Before the formation of Anderson County, Tennessee, that territory was initially land of what is today called the Eastern Band of Cherokee Indians, which had been settled by several pioneer families including the Wallace, Gibbs, Freels, Frost and Tunnell families. Although the Treaty of Holston, signed in 1791, was intended as a negotiation with the Cherokee to prohibit settlement of the area including what is today Anderson County, the treaty became ineffective as more settlers moved through the Appalachian Mountains from Virginia and North Carolina into Tennessee. The flooding of white settlers into the Indian domain was cause for several skirmishes, which eased after the Treaty of Tellico in 1798 (with an origination point for relinquished land from the Cherokee being the Tellico Blockhouse) allowed for greater ease in settling the area.

Anderson County was partitioned from a portion of Grainger County, Tennessee as well as a portion of Knox County, Tennessee, in 1801; neighboring Roane County, Tennessee, was also formed from a portion of Knox County, Tennessee, in 1801, making Anderson and Roane counties effectively called 'sister counties'. Anderson County was named in honor of Joseph Anderson (1757–1847), who was at that time U.S. senator from Tennessee, and whose career also included judge of the Superior Court of the Territory South of the River Ohio and Comptroller of the U.S. Treasury.

Like many East Tennessee counties, the residents of Anderson County were largely opposed to secession on the eve of the Civil War. On June 8, 1861, Anderson Countians voted against Tennessee's Ordinance of Secession, 1,278 to 97.

The construction of Norris Dam, the first dam built by the Tennessee Valley Authority, brought major changes to the county in the 1930s. Approximately 2900 families were relocated from reservoir lands in Anderson and nearby counties during the construction, which began in 1933 and was completed in 1936. The town of Norris was initially built as a planned community to house the workers involved in the construction of this dam. As a result of the dam completion and operation, the temperature of the downstream Clinch River bed changed, so that a former pearl industry which had been successful for many years evaporated as the mussels, once prevalent in the river, were not able to sustain life in the changed climate.

During World War II, the federal government's Manhattan Project brought more change to the county, including the displacement of more families and the founding of Oak Ridge.

The Museum of Appalachia in Norris commemorates pioneer and rural life of past decades in Anderson County and the surrounding region. It is also an antique shop that sells artifacts from the times of the first settlers to the times of the Coal Creek War.

== Geography ==
According to the U.S. Census Bureau, the county has a total area of 345 square miles (890 km^{2}), of which 337 square miles (870 km^{2}) is land and 7.6 square miles (20 km^{2}) (2.2%) is water.

=== Adjacent counties ===
- Campbell County (north)
- Union County (northeast)
- Knox County (southeast)
- Roane County (southwest)
- Morgan County (west)
- Scott County (northwest)

=== National protected area ===
- Manhattan Project National Historical Park (part)

=== State protected areas ===
- Norris Dam State Park (part)
- North Cumberland Wildlife Management Area (part)

== Demographics ==
Historical population
Census	Pop.	Note	%±
1810	3,959		—
1820	4,668		17.9%
1830	5,310		13.8%
1840	5,658		6.6%
1850	6,938		22.6%
1860	7,068		1.9%
1870	8,704		23.1%
1880	10,820		24.3%
1890	15,128		39.8%
1900	17,634		16.6%
1910	17,717		0.5%
1920	18,298		3.3%
1930	19,722		7.8%
1940	26,504		34.4%
1950	59,407		124.1%
1960	60,032		1.1%
1970	60,300		0.4%
1980	67,346		11.7%
1990	68,250		1.3%
2000	71,330		4.5%
2010	75,129		5.3%
2020	77,123		2.7%
2025 (est.)	82,066	▲	6.4%
U.S. Decennial Census; 1790-1960 1900-1990; 1990-2000 2010-2020

=== Racial and ethnic composition ===
Anderson County, Tennessee – Racial and ethnic composition Note: the US Census treats Hispanic/Latino as an ethnic category. This table excludes Latinos from the racial categories and assigns them to a separate category. Hispanics/Latinos may be of any race.
Race / ethnicity (NH = Non-Hispanic)	Pop 1980	Pop 1990	Pop 2000	Pop 2010	Pop 2020	% 1980	% 1990	% 2000	% 2010	% 2020
White alone (NH)	63,714	64,320	66,124	68,134	66,044	94.61%	94.24%	92.70%	90.69%	85.63%
Black or African American alone (NH)	2,556	2,753	2,749	2,817	2,841	3.80%	4.03%	3.85%	3.75%	3.68%
Native American or Alaska Native alone (NH)	164	236	221	211	217	0.24%	0.35%	0.31%	0.28%	0.28%
Asian alone (NH)	425	537	577	796	975	0.63%	0.79%	0.81%	1.06%	1.26%
Native Hawaiian or Pacific Islander alone (NH)	x	x	9	15	53	x	x	0.01%	0.02%	0.07%
Other race alone (NH)	61	23	49	68	272	0.09%	0.03%	0.07%	0.09%	0.35%
Mixed race or Multiracial (NH)	x	x	814	1,320	3,901	x	x	1.14%	1.76%	5.06%
Hispanic or Latino (any race)	426	381	787	1,768	2,820	0.63%	0.56%	1.10%	2.35%	3.66%
Total	67,346	68,250	71,330	75,129	77,123	100.00%	100.00%	100.00%	100.00%	100.00%

=== 2020 census ===
As of the 2020 census, there were 77,123 people, 31,993 households, and 19,074 families residing in the county.

The racial makeup of the county was 86.7% White, 3.7% Black or African American, 0.4% American Indian and Alaska Native, 1.3% Asian, 0.1% Native Hawaiian and Pacific Islander, 1.6% from some other race, and 6.3% from two or more races. Hispanic or Latino residents of any race comprised 3.7% of the population.

The median age was 43.2 years, with 21.1% of residents under the age of 18 and 20.5% aged 65 or older. For every 100 females, there were 94.8 males, and for every 100 females age 18 and over there were 92.3 males.

Among the 31,993 households, 27.9% had children under the age of 18 living with them. Of all households, 46.3% were married-couple households, 18.8% were households with a male householder and no spouse or partner present, and 28.4% were households with a female householder and no spouse or partner present. About 29.6% of all households were made up of individuals and 13.2% had someone living alone who was 65 years of age or older.

There were 35,143 housing units, of which 9.0% were vacant. Among occupied housing units, 68.8% were owner-occupied and 31.2% were renter-occupied. The homeowner vacancy rate was 1.4% and the rental vacancy rate was 7.4%.

63.5% of residents lived in urban areas, while 36.5% lived in rural areas.

=== 2000 census ===
As of the census of 2000, there were 71,330 people, 29,780 households, and 20,518 families residing in the county. The population density was 211 people per square mile (81 people/km^{2}). There were 32,451 housing units at an average density of 96 units per square mile (37/km^{2}). The racial makeup of the county was 93.36% White, 3.88% Black or African American, 0.32% Native American, 0.83% Asian, 0.01% Pacific Islander, 0.38% from other races, and 1.22% from two or more races. 1.10% of the population were Hispanic or Latino of any race.

According to the 2000 Census the largest ancestry groups in Anderson County were English (37%), Irish (14.7%), German (13.5%), Scots-Irish (4.5%) and Scottish (3.1%).

There were 29,780 households, out of which 29.60% had children under the age of 18 living with them, 53.80% were married couples living together, 11.50% had a female householder with no husband present, and 31.10% were non-families. 27.70% of all households were made up of individuals, and 12.10% had someone living alone who was 65 years of age or older. The average household size was 2.37 and the average family size was 2.88.

In the county, the population was spread out, with 23.20% under the age of 18, 7.50% from 18 to 24, 27.30% from 25 to 44, 25.50% from 45 to 64, and 16.60% who were 65 years of age or older. The median age was 40 years. For every 100 females, there were 91.10 males. For every 100 females age 18 and over, there were 87.40 males.

The median income for a household in the county was $35,483, and the median income for a family was $42,584. Males had a median income of $33,710 versus $23,467 for females. The per capita income for the county was $19,009. About 10.20% of families and 13.10% of the population were below the poverty line, including 18.40% of those under age 18 and 8.80% of those age 65 or over.

== Economy ==
Anderson County has a thriving tourism industry, thanks to major attractions such as Norris Lake, the Green McAdoo School, the Museum of Appalachia, and American Museum of Science and Energy, and the county is considered a part of the Norris Highlands.

== Communities ==
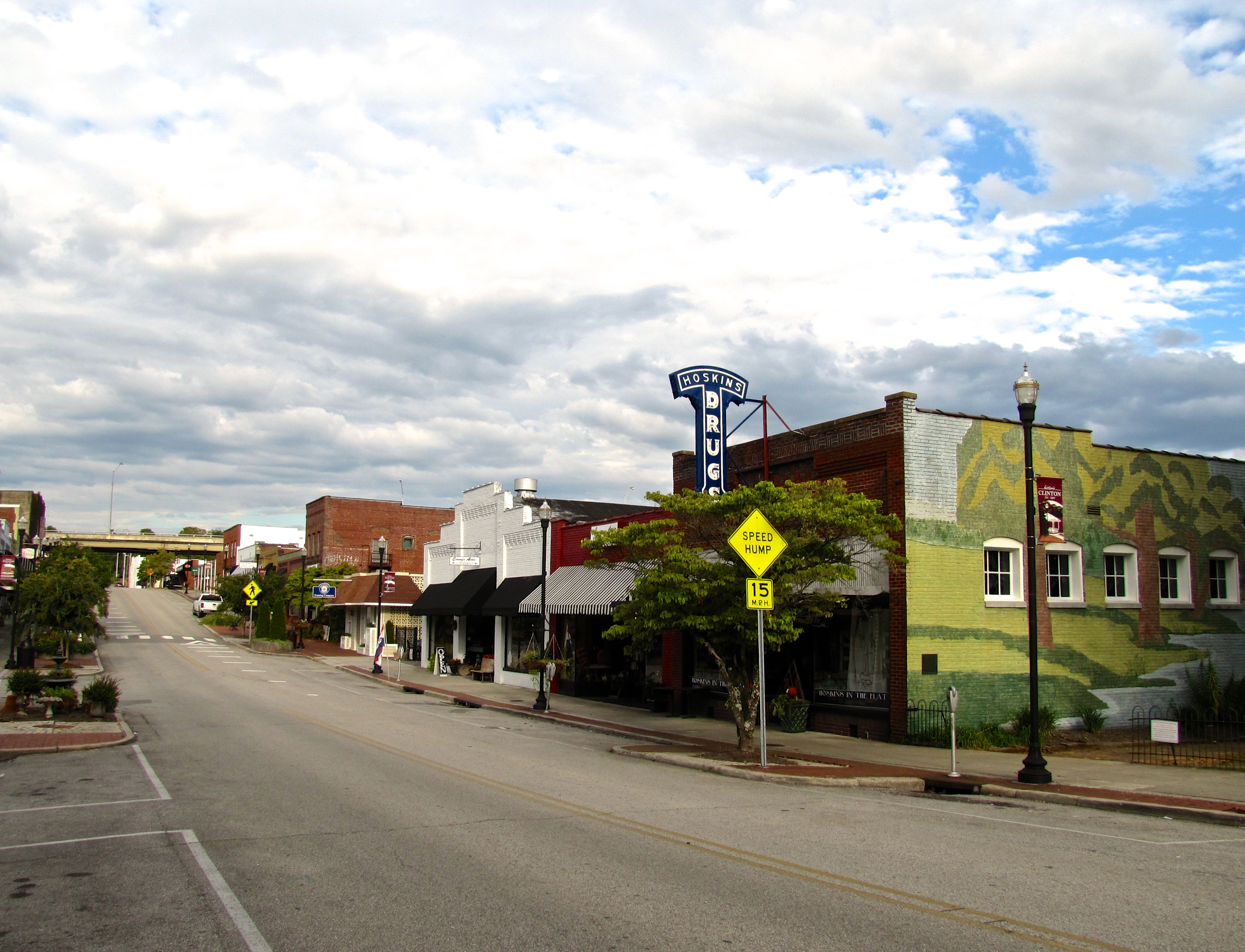
Clinton

=== Cities ===
- Clinton (county seat)
- Norris
- Oak Ridge (partial)
- Rocky Top (partial)

=== Town ===
- Oliver Springs (partial)

=== Census-designated place ===
- Andersonville
- Briceville

=== Unincorporated communities ===
- Beech Grove
- Belmont
- Bethel
- Braytown
- Buffalo
- Claxton
- Devonia
- Fork Mountain
- Fraterville
- Heiskell (partial)
- King Arthur Court
- Marlow
- Medford
- Stainville

== Politics ==
Anderson County has traditionally leaned Republican, consistent with East Tennessee’s Unionist roots, but the creation of Oak Ridge during World War II, when the federal government established the city in 1942 as part of the Manhattan Project, brought in thousands of scientists, engineers, and federal employees who provided Democrats with a stronger base of support than in surrounding counties. Oak Ridge made Anderson County more politically competitive through much of the mid-20th century, but in recent decades the county has trended back Republican, with Democratic strength largely confined to parts of Oak Ridge. The last Democratic presidential candidate to carry the county was Bill Clinton in 1996.

United States presidential election results for Anderson County, Tennessee
Year	Republican		Democratic		Third party(ies)	
Year	No.	%	No.	%	No.	%
1912	539	23.04%	597	25.52%	1,203	51.43%
1916	1,730	75.68%	537	23.49%	19	0.83%
1920	3,127	80.30%	748	19.21%	19	0.49%
1924	1,495	69.28%	548	25.39%	115	5.33%
1928	2,304	81.27%	531	18.73%	0	0.00%
1932	1,605	59.51%	1,081	40.08%	11	0.41%
1936	1,805	42.84%	2,348	55.73%	60	1.42%
1940	1,852	45.27%	2,218	54.22%	21	0.51%
1944	3,424	49.48%	3,476	50.23%	20	0.29%
1948	5,372	45.38%	5,915	49.97%	550	4.65%
1952	10,489	53.88%	8,939	45.92%	38	0.20%
1956	11,071	52.42%	9,368	44.35%	682	3.23%
1960	11,153	52.56%	9,878	46.55%	190	0.90%
1964	8,860	42.18%	12,146	57.82%	0	0.00%
1968	10,233	47.04%	7,198	33.09%	4,323	19.87%
1972	13,865	66.03%	6,713	31.97%	421	2.00%
1976	10,494	43.29%	13,455	55.50%	293	1.21%
1980	14,235	55.31%	10,194	39.61%	1,307	5.08%
1984	16,783	61.31%	10,415	38.05%	176	0.64%
1988	15,056	60.74%	9,589	38.68%	143	0.58%
1992	11,838	41.38%	13,482	47.12%	3,291	11.50%
1996	11,943	43.40%	13,457	48.91%	2,116	7.69%
2000	14,688	51.04%	13,556	47.10%	535	1.86%
2004	18,510	58.42%	12,896	40.70%	276	0.87%
2008	19,675	62.32%	11,396	36.10%	499	1.58%
2012	18,968	63.95%	10,122	34.13%	569	1.92%
2016	19,212	64.30%	9,013	30.16%	1,656	5.54%
2020	23,184	65.18%	11,741	33.01%	645	1.81%
2024	24,582	67.26%	11,525	31.53%	441	1.21%

== See also ==
- National Register of Historic Places listings in Anderson County, Tennessee
