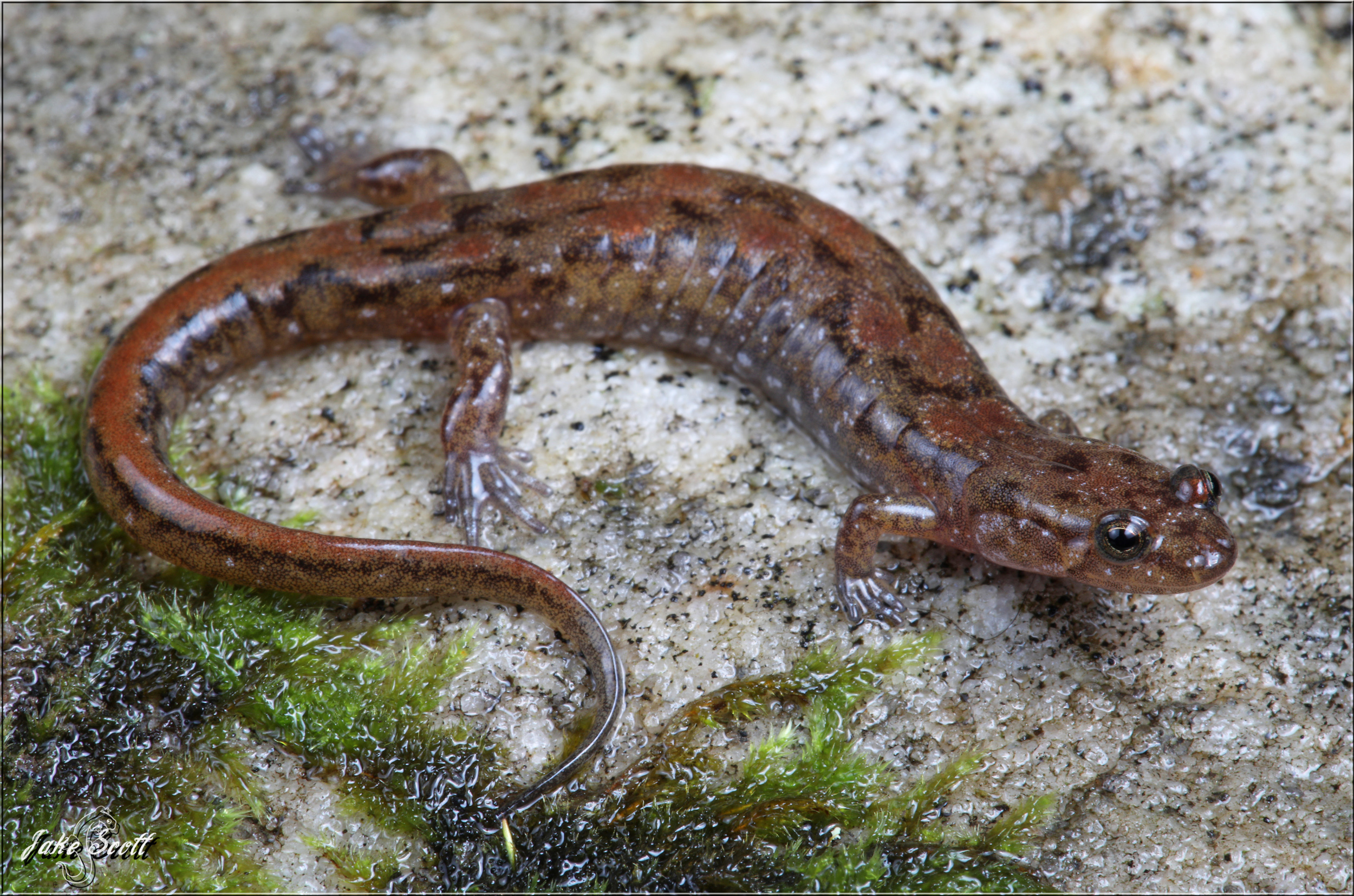

Conservation status
- Near Threatened (IUCN 3.1)

Scientific classification
- Kingdom: Animalia
- Phylum: Chordata
- Class: Amphibia
- Order: Urodela
- Family: Plethodontidae
- Genus: Desmognathus
- Species: D. abditus

Binomial name
- Desmognathus abditus Anderson and Tilley, 2003

= Cumberland dusky salamander =

Species of amphibian

The Cumberland dusky salamander (Desmognathus abditus) is a species of salamander in the family of lungless salamanders, Plethodontidae. It is endemic to the United States. Its natural habitats are temperate forests and rivers. This species is threatened by habitat loss.

== Distribution and habitat ==
This species was first described by Anderson and Tilley in 2003 and little information is known about it. Prior to that time the Allegheny Mountain dusky salamander (Desmognathus ochrophaeus) had been thought to be a single species but studies using nucleic acid sequencing and agar gel electrophoresis have since shown it to be a species complex. The Cumberland dusky salamander is one of five members of this complex and has been found at several sites in Tennessee on the Cumberland Plateau. The most northerly of these is near Wartburg in Morgan County and the most southerly is on the southern side of the Cumberland Plateau near Tracy City in Grundy County. All known specimens have been found under rocks in streams or within a metre (yard) of flowing water and a favoured location is moss-covered rocks behind cascades.

== Ecology ==
Several other species of salamander occupy the same range as the Cumberland dusky salamander and it is believed to hybridize with the Allegheny Mountain dusky salamander (Desmognathus ochrophaeus) and the Ocoee Salamander (Desmognathus ocoee).

It is likely that the Cumberland dusky salamander feeds on small invertebrates found in leaf litter. It may itself be eaten by small mammals, birds and snakes and perhaps by other larger salamanders in the genus Desmognathus.

== Status ==
The Cumberland dusky salamander is listed as "near threatened" in the IUCN Red List of Threatened Species. The exact size of the population is unknown but the species is restricted to a single tract of land in Tennessee and its natural habitat is threatened by the building of retirement and vacation homes. Its status is made more secure by the fact that it occurs in two protected areas, the Frozen Head State Park and the Obed River area which is designated as a "National Wild and Scenic River".
