= WECO =

WECO may refer to:

- Western Electric Company
- Winnipeg Electric Company
- WECO (AM), a radio station (940 AM) licensed to Wartburg, Tennessee, United States
- WECO-FM, a radio station (101.3 FM) licensed to Wartburg, Tennessee, United States
- WECO Lab
- WECO Pyrotechnische Fabrik, a German fireworks company
- Wisconsin Engraving Company, a tooling industry services provider.
