= Coalfield, Tennessee =

- Census-designated place
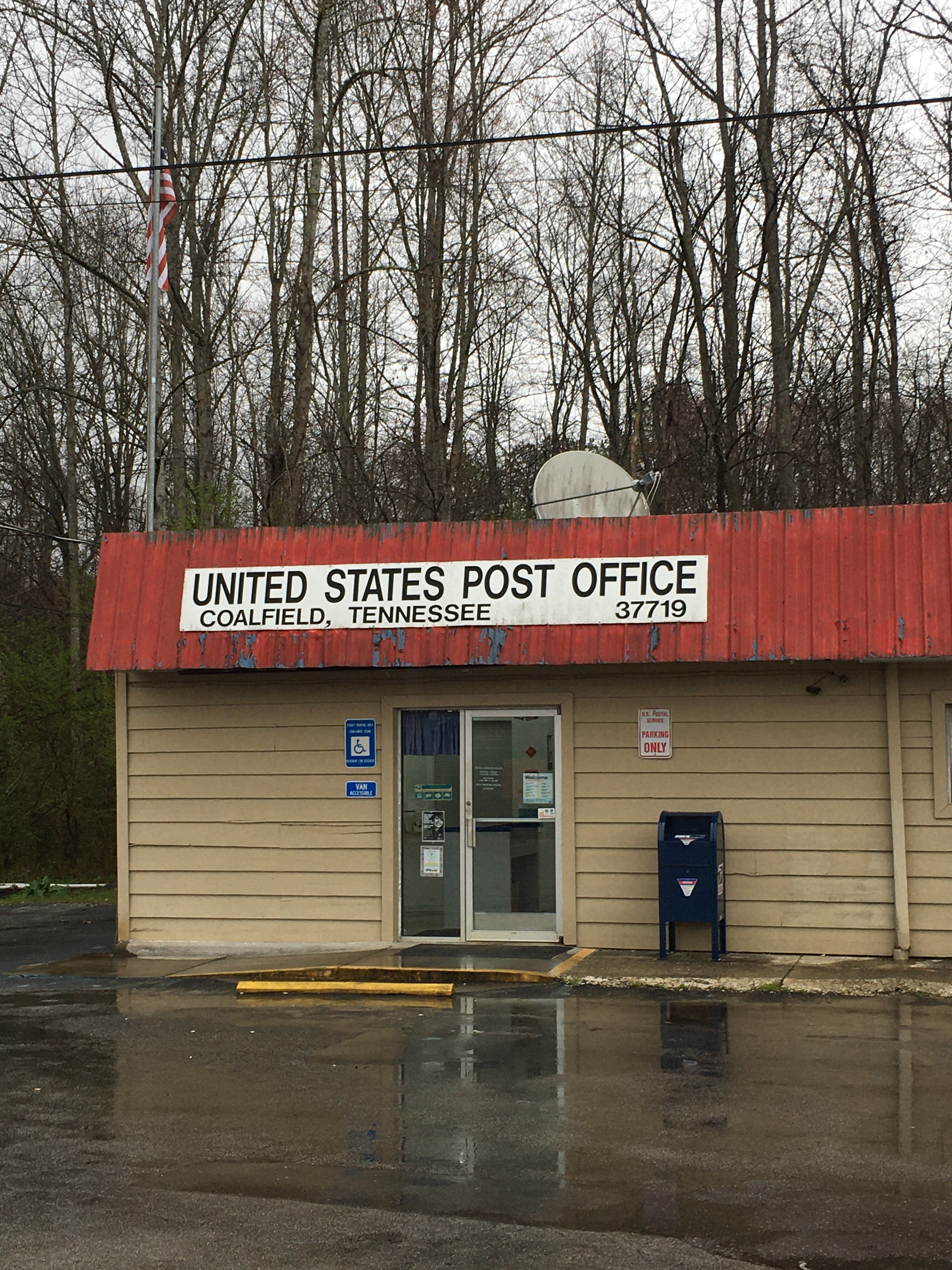
- Coalfield Post Office

- Location within Tennessee
- Coordinates: 36°01′44″N 84°25′15″W
- Country: United States
- State: Tennessee
- County: Morgan
- Established: 1850

Area
  - Total: 24.73 sq mi (64.06 km^{2})
  - Land: 24.73 sq mi (64.06 km^{2})
  - Water: 0 sq mi (0.00 km^{2})
- Elevation: 1,030 ft (310 m)

Population (2020)
  - Total: 2,361
  - Density: 95.5/sq mi (36.86/km^{2})
- Time zone: UTC-5 (Eastern (EST))
  - Summer (DST): UTC-4 (EDT)
- ZIP code: 37719, 37840
- Area codes: 423, 865
- GNIS feature ID: 1306005
- Website: sites.google.com/a/mcsed.net/coalfield/

Coalfield is an unincorporated community and census-designated place (CDP) in Morgan County, Tennessee, United States. As of the 2010 census, the population of the CDP was 2,463, making Coalfield the most populous settlement in all of Morgan County. The community does have its own post office, with the ZIP code 37719.

== History ==
Coalfield was originally known as "Ruffner's Station" after Shack Ruffner, an early settler who built a mill in the area. The name "Coalfield" reflects the community's coal mining tradition. It was the site of Coalfield Camp No. 1 and Coalfield Camp No. 2.

== Geography ==
Coalfield is between Wartburg and Oliver Springs on Tennessee State Route 62. To the west are Frozen Head State Park and the community of Joyner, Tennessee.

== Demographics ==
=== 2020 census ===
Coalfield racial composition
Race	Number	Percentage
White (non-Hispanic)	2,275	96.36%
Native American	2	0.08%
Asian	3	0.13%
Pacific Islander	1	0.04%
Other/Mixed	67	2.84%
Hispanic or Latino	13	0.55%

As of the 2020 United States census, there were 2,361 people, 960 households, and 795 families residing in the CDP.

Historical population
Census	Pop.	Note	%±
2010	2,463		—
2020	2,361		−4.1%
U.S. Decennial Census

== Education ==
A Morgan County Schools public school, Coalfield School, is located in the heart of the community. Enrollment in 2018 2019 was 490 (all grades from pre-kindergarten to grade 12), with 41 students in Grade 12 and 31.0 (on an FTE basis) teaching staff. The school's mascot is the Yellow Jacket. Coalfield Won the Class A State baseball championship in 1998, and was the Class A football State runner-up in 2014.

== Notable people ==
- Sid Hudson, baseball player and coach, was a native of Coalfield.
- Ethan Lively, singer-songwriter, contestant on NBC's The Voice (Season 20).
- Ezra Malachi "Pat" McGlothlin, baseball player, was born in Coalfield.
