= Shady Grove, Morgan County, Tennessee =

Shady Grove, Tennessee
- Unincorporated community
- Location within Tennessee Location within the United States
- Coordinates: 36°06′13″N 84°40′29″W
- Country: United States
- State: Tennessee
- County: Morgan
- Elevation: 1,384 ft (422 m)
- Time zone: UTC-5 (Eastern (EST))
  - Summer (DST): UTC-4 (EDT)
- Area code: 423
- GNIS feature ID: 1315906

Shady Grove is an unincorporated community in Morgan County, Tennessee, United States. Shady Grove is 4.3 miles (6.9 km) west of Wartburg.
