= Frozen Head =

Mountain in Tennessee, United States

- Location within Tennessee

Highest point
- Elevation: 3,278 ft (999 m)
- Coordinates: 36°07′21″N 84°27′28″W

Geography
- Location: Morgan County, Tennessee, U.S.
- Parent range: Cumberland Mountains
- Topo map: USGS Petros

Frozen Head is a mountain in Morgan County, Tennessee. It is the second highest peak in the Crab Orchard Mountains, at 3,278 feet (999 m). Frozen Head is located in Frozen Head State Park and Natural Area.
