= Midway, Morgan County, Tennessee =

Midway
- Unincorporated community
- Location within Tennessee Location within the United States
- Coordinates: 36°16′45″N 84°39′25″W
- Country: United States
- State: Tennessee
- County: Morgan
- Elevation: 1,335 ft (407 m)
- Time zone: UTC-5 (Eastern (EST))
  - Summer (DST): UTC-4 (EDT)
- Area code: 423
- GNIS feature ID: 1647204

Midway is an unincorporated community in Morgan County, Tennessee. Midway is located on U.S. Route 27 and Tennessee State Route 29 2.6 miles (4.2 km) north-northeast of Sunbright.
