= Crab Orchard Mountains =

Mountain range in Tennessee, United States

Coordinates: 35.953°N 84.796°W

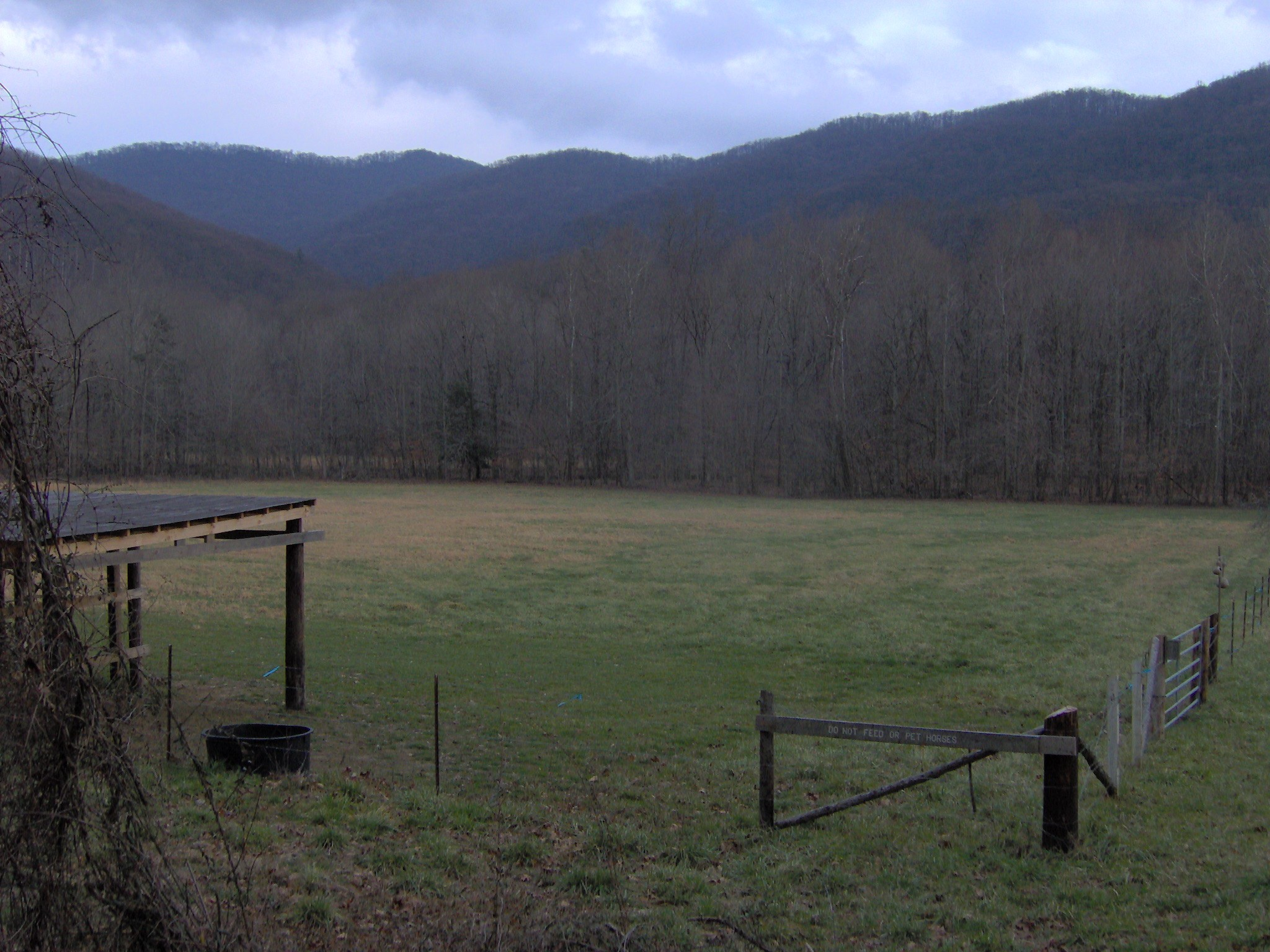
Crab Orchard Mountains

The Crab Orchard Mountains are a rugged, detached range of the southern Cumberland Mountains. They are situated in East Tennessee atop the Cumberland Plateau just west of the plateau's eastern escarpment, and comprise parts of Morgan, Anderson, and Cumberland counties. The Crab Orchard Mountains have many peaks over 3,000 ft., with the highest being Big Fodderstack at 3,340 feet (1,020 m) and Frozen Head at 3,324 feet (1,013 m), the latter and part of the former being located in Frozen Head State Park. These mountains are some of the highest mountains in Tennessee west of the Blue Ridge Mountains. The mountains are made rugged by the erosion of many streams that have cut deep gorges into the mountains. The Crab Orchard Mountains are still one of the most rural areas in all of Appalachia. The historic Brushy Mountain State Penitentiary is located at the base of Frozen Head in Petros, bounded on the north and west by Frozen Head State Park.
