= Brushy Mountain State Penitentiary =

Coordinates: 36.1052°N 84.4529°W

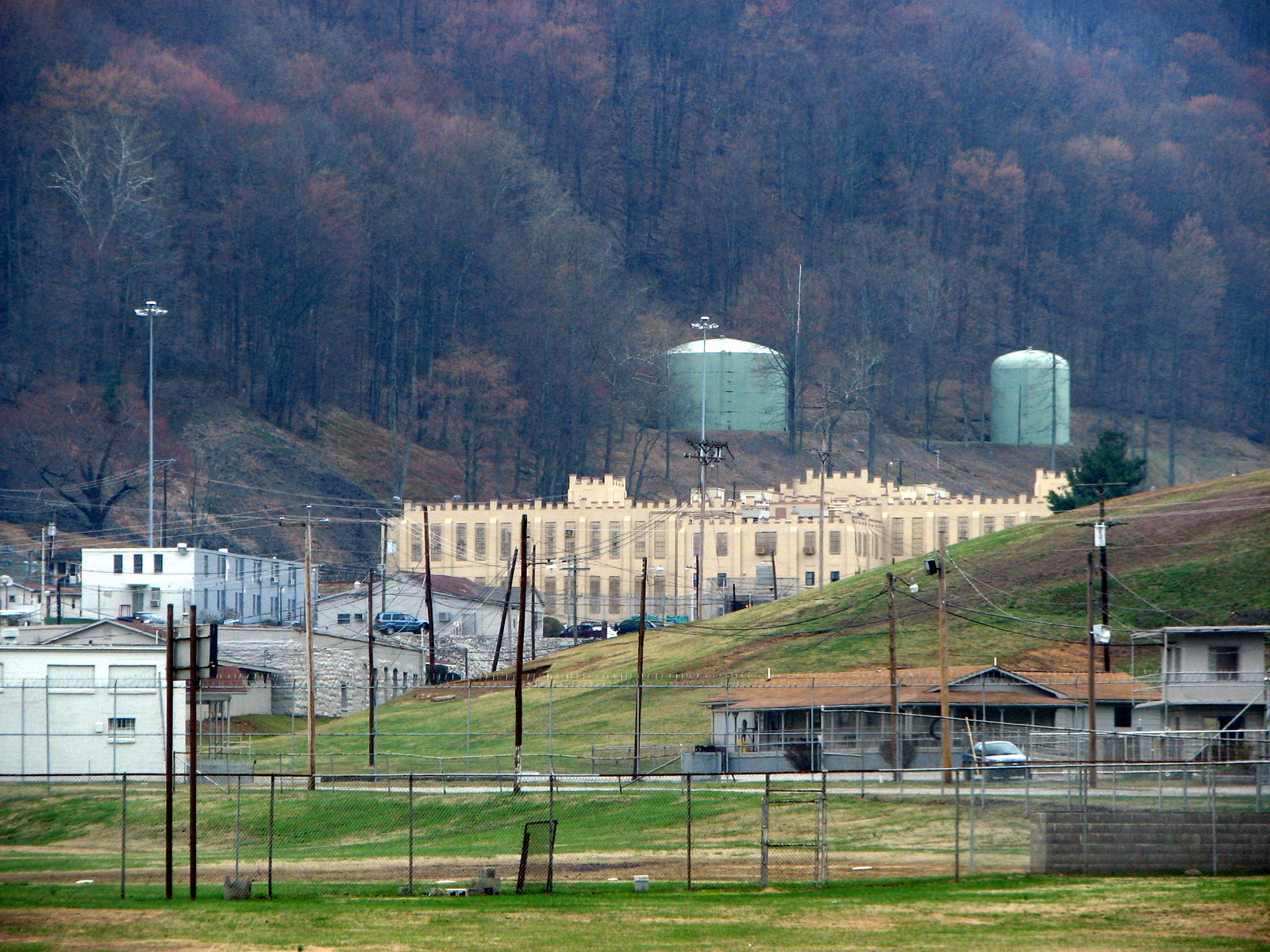
Brushy Mountain State Prison, 2009

Brushy Mountain State Penitentiary, last named Brushy Mountain Correctional Complex, (or, unofficially, Brushy) was a maximum-security prison in the community of Petros in Morgan County, Tennessee, operated by the Tennessee Department of Correction. It was established in 1896 and operated until 2009.

Beginning in 2018, the site has been transformed into a tourist destination, offering tours, events, concerts, and foot races along with a restaurant and distillery.

== History ==
Brushy Mountain State Penitentiary opened in 1896 in the aftermath of the Coal Creek War, an 1891 lockout of coal miners that took place in Coal Creek and Briceville, Tennessee, after miners protested the use of unpaid convict leasing in the mines. This labor conflict resulted in a bill passed by the Tennessee state legislature to abolish the convict labor system. In response the state constructed the Brushy Mountain Mine and Prison. The mountainous, secure site was located with the help of consulting geologists, and Brushy Mountain convicts built a railroad spur, worked the coal mines on site, operated coke ovens, or farmed. At the end of all the state's convict lease arrangements on January 1, 1896, some 210 of those prisoners became the first inmates of Brushy Mountain.

The original prison was a wooden structure also built by prisoner labor. It was replaced in the 1920s with a castle-like building constructed from stone mined by prisoners from a quarry on the property. The prison is nearly encircled by rugged wooded terrain in a remote section of the Cumberland Plateau, adjacent to Frozen Head State Park and Natural Area. Escape attempts were infrequent and almost always unsuccessful. Perhaps the best-known escape attempt occurred on June 10, 1977, when James Earl Ray, the assassin of Martin Luther King Jr., escaped with six other inmates by climbing over a fence. Ray was captured less than 58 hours later in rugged mountain terrain 8 1/2 miles from the prison.

The prison was closed in 1972 after a strike by prison guards protesting unsafe working conditions. It reopened in 1976. Brushy Mountain was the only unionized prison in the state. The union worked closely with state legislators to improve the working conditions for correctional staff across the state. Under Governor Lamar Alexander attempts were made to squeeze the union out of existence, but his efforts were fruitless. Additional attempts over the years also proved unsuccessful. Many efforts to close the prison were attempted long before the 2009 closure. In 1998, Brushy Mountain Prison was administratively joined with Morgan County Correctional Complex. With the joining of the two institutions, both prisons became unionized.

In the 1980s, Brushy Mountain ended its long-standing function as a maximum security prison and assumed a mission as a classification facility. In its final operations, it had a capacity of 584 and was used as the state's reception/classification and diagnostic center for East Tennessee. It housed all custody levels of inmates, although it retained a maximum security designation because of the 96-bed maximum security annex contained within the prison walls, which was used to house the state's most troublesome inmates. The last warden was Jim Worthington. The prison closed on June 11, 2009. Its functions were transferred to the Morgan County Correctional Complex.

In 2018, Brushy Mountain was re-opened to the public for tours, private events, car shows, and concerts. Brushy also houses a distillery that produces moonshine, vodka, whiskey, and liqueurs. In addition, Brushy features the Warden's Table Restaurant, which serves Southern and American staples such as barbecue and cheeseburgers in a cafeteria-like format.

== Notable inmates ==
In addition to James Earl Ray, the convicted assassin of Martin Luther King Jr., notable inmates included Byron Looper, who was convicted in 2000 for the murder of State Senator Tommy Burks and began serving his life sentence at Brushy Mountain, Paul Dennis Reid, a serial killer known as the "Fast Food Killer" who served part of his time on death row at Brushy Mountain. George Hyatte, one of the perpetrators of the 2005 Kingston courthouse shooting, was imprisoned at Brushy Mountain at the time of that incident. Chattanooga serial rapist and convicted murderer Harold Wayne Nichols served 18 months between 1984 and 1986 for the attempted rape of a woman during a burglary.

== In popular culture ==
In the novel The Silence of the Lambs, Hannibal Lecter is offered a transfer to Brushy Mountain in exchange for providing information about Buffalo Bill, a serial killer.
