= Wartburg Presbyterian Church =

Historic church in Tennessee, United States

- U.S. National Register of Historic Places
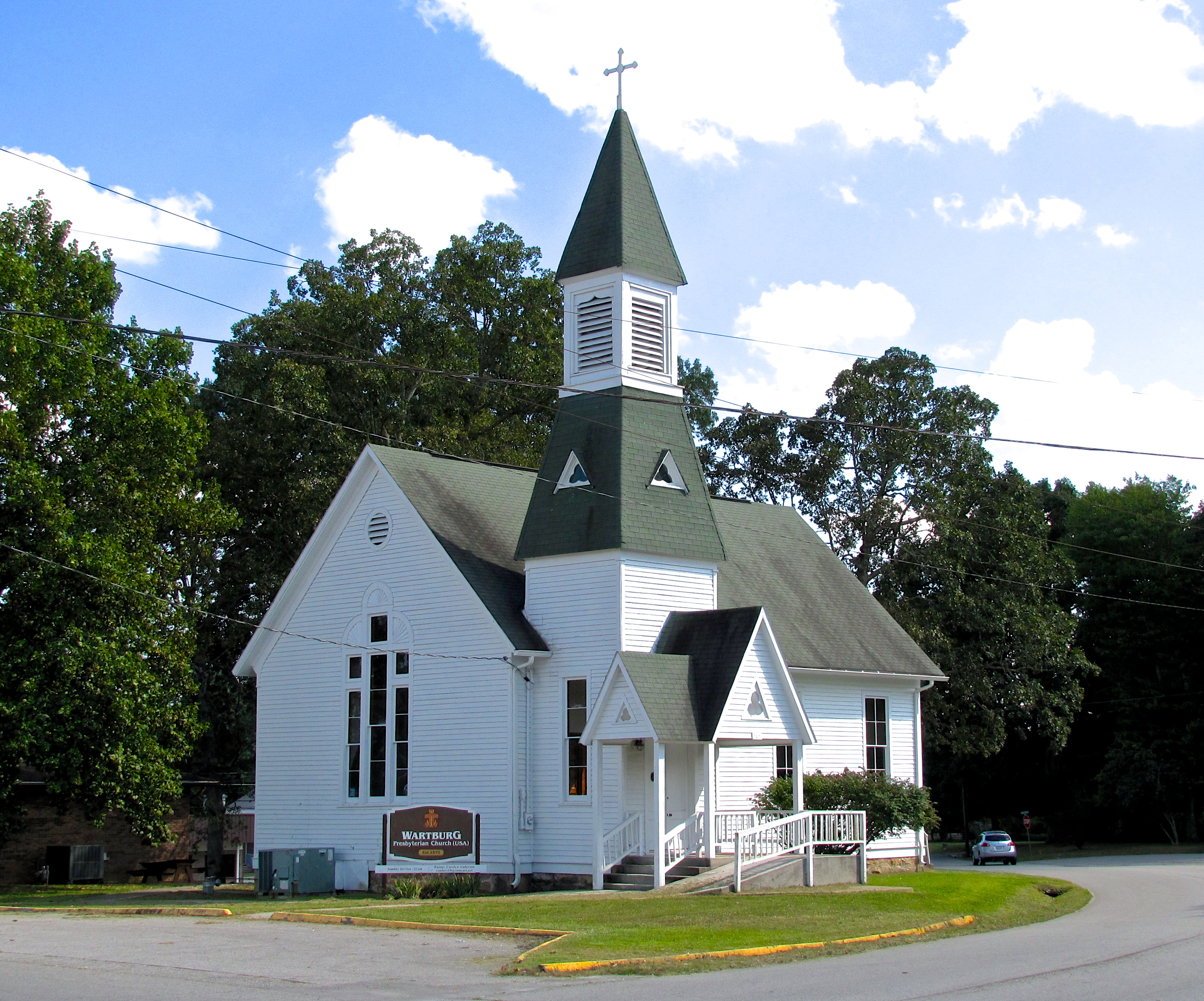

- Location within Tennessee Location within the United States
- Location: 205 South Kingston Street, Wartburg, Tennessee
- Coordinates: 36.10365°N 84.59732°W
- Built: 1883
- NRHP reference No.: 13000952
- Added to NRHP: December 18, 2013

Wartburg Presbyterian Church is a historic Presbyterian church in Wartburg, Tennessee. The congregation was established in 1879 and the church building was constructed in 1883. The church building was listed on the National Register of Historic Places in December 2013.
