= Lone Mountain State Forest =

State Forest in Morgan County, Tennessee

Coordinates: 36.07220°N 84.55151°W

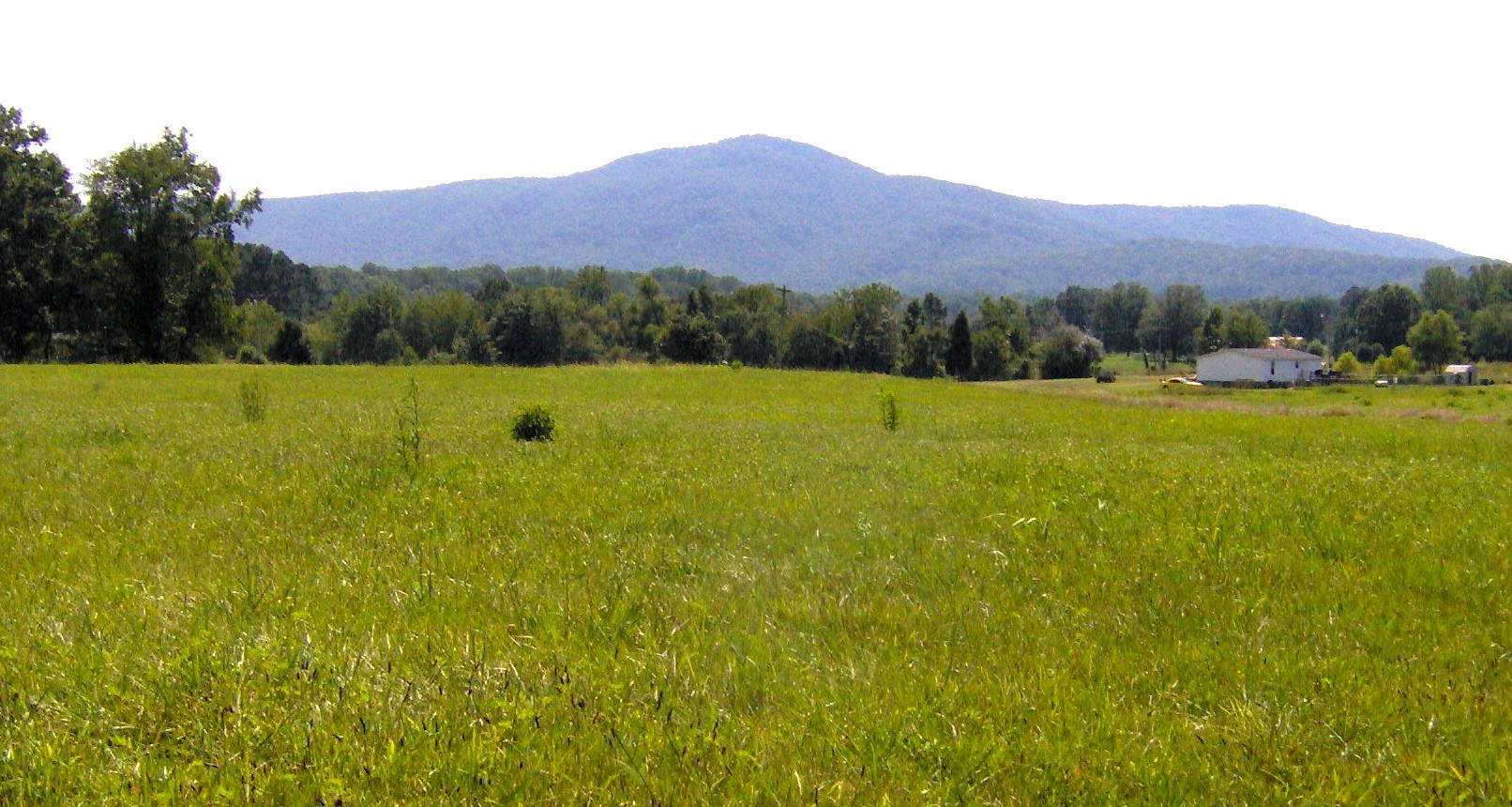
Lone Mountain, rising above central Morgan County

Lone Mountain State Forest is a state forest in Morgan County, Tennessee, located in the southeastern United States. The forest consists of 3,624 acres (14.67 km^{2}) managed by the Tennessee Department of Agriculture.

Lone Mountain is a detached ridge-like mountain rising to an elevation of 2,530 feet (770 m) in the southern half of Morgan County. Although the mountain's altitude is not particularly notable, its isolation makes it one of the 25 most prominent mountains in the state of Tennessee.

== Geographical setting ==
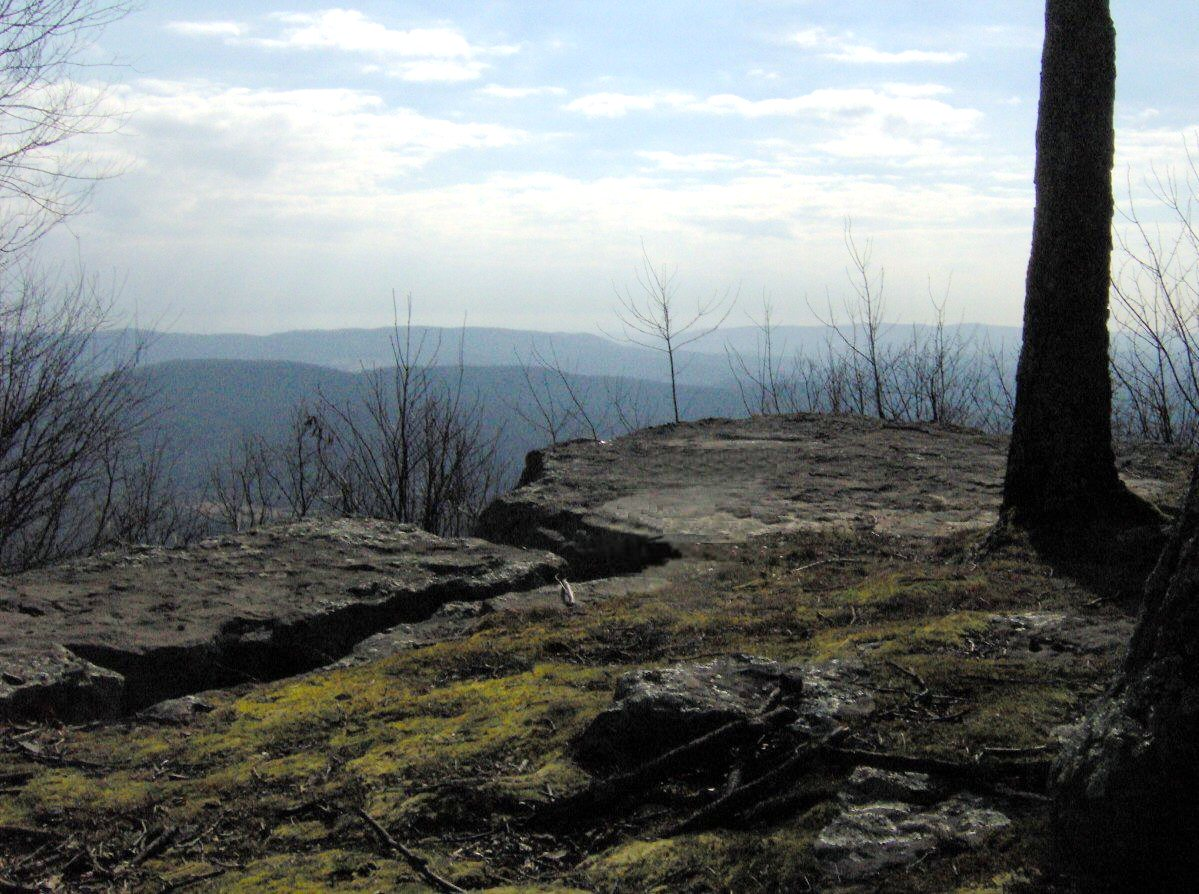
Coyote Point, on the south slope of Lone Mountain

Lone Mountain is located on the western fringe of the Crab Orchard Mountains, the southern tip of the Cumberland Mountains which rise atop the Cumberland Plateau just west of the plateau's Walden Ridge escarpment. The mountain's western base is formed by the Emory River, which flows down from its source near the summit of Bird Mountain to the northeast and winds around the base of the range before descending the plateau and emptying into the Watts Bar Lake impoundment of the Tennessee River. Lone Mountain's northern base is formed by Crooked Fork, a tributary of the Emory. Bitter Creek, which flows roughly parallel to the Emory, slices a substantial valley along Lone Mountain's eastern base, splitting the mountain off from the rest of the Crab Orchard range.

Lone Mountain spans much of the stretch of U.S. Route 27 between Harriman and Wartburg. The community of Mossy Grove is situated at the mountain's eastern base in the Bitter Creek valley.

== History ==
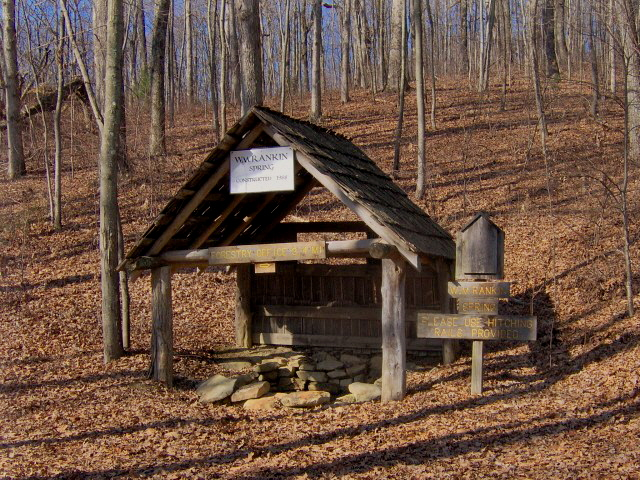
Rankin Spring, a watering hole on the east slope of Lone Mountain

Lone Mountain State Forest was created from a land donation by the Lone Mountain Land Company in 1938 and a large land purchase by the Morgan County Chancery Court the following year. Lone Mountain was managed as part of Morgan State Forest until 1970, when it became an independent state forest. The State Forestry Division managed Lone Mountain with a "hands-off" approach to allow the forest to recover from damage caused by the Lone Mountain Land Company. Timber harvests within the forest are therefore relatively rare.

In 2002, a tornado swept across Morgan County, devastating the community of Mossy Grove and wiping out some 500 acres (2.0 km^{2}) of trees in Lone Mountain State Forest. The tornado caused the closure of the Carl Black Spur trail which remains closed as of 2008. Forestry officials plan to have the Carl Black Spur trail open for the public again soon. The tornado opened up the opportunity for a new trail aptly named Twister Pass which runs from the South West trail up to Todds Landing. Southern pine beetle infestations in the 1970s and 1990s killed off a large number of the forest's pine trees, leaving mostly hardwoods.

== Features ==
Lone Mountain has approximately 15 miles (24 km) of trails, the most popular of which leads to Coyote Point, an overlook just below the summit on the south slope of the mountain. The trails were developed in the late 1980s for horseback riding, and are well-equipped with watering holes and hitching posts. The trails are also open to hikers and mountain bikers. The trailhead is located just west of US-27 along Clayton Howard Road.
