= Frozen Head State Park =

State park in Tennessee, United States

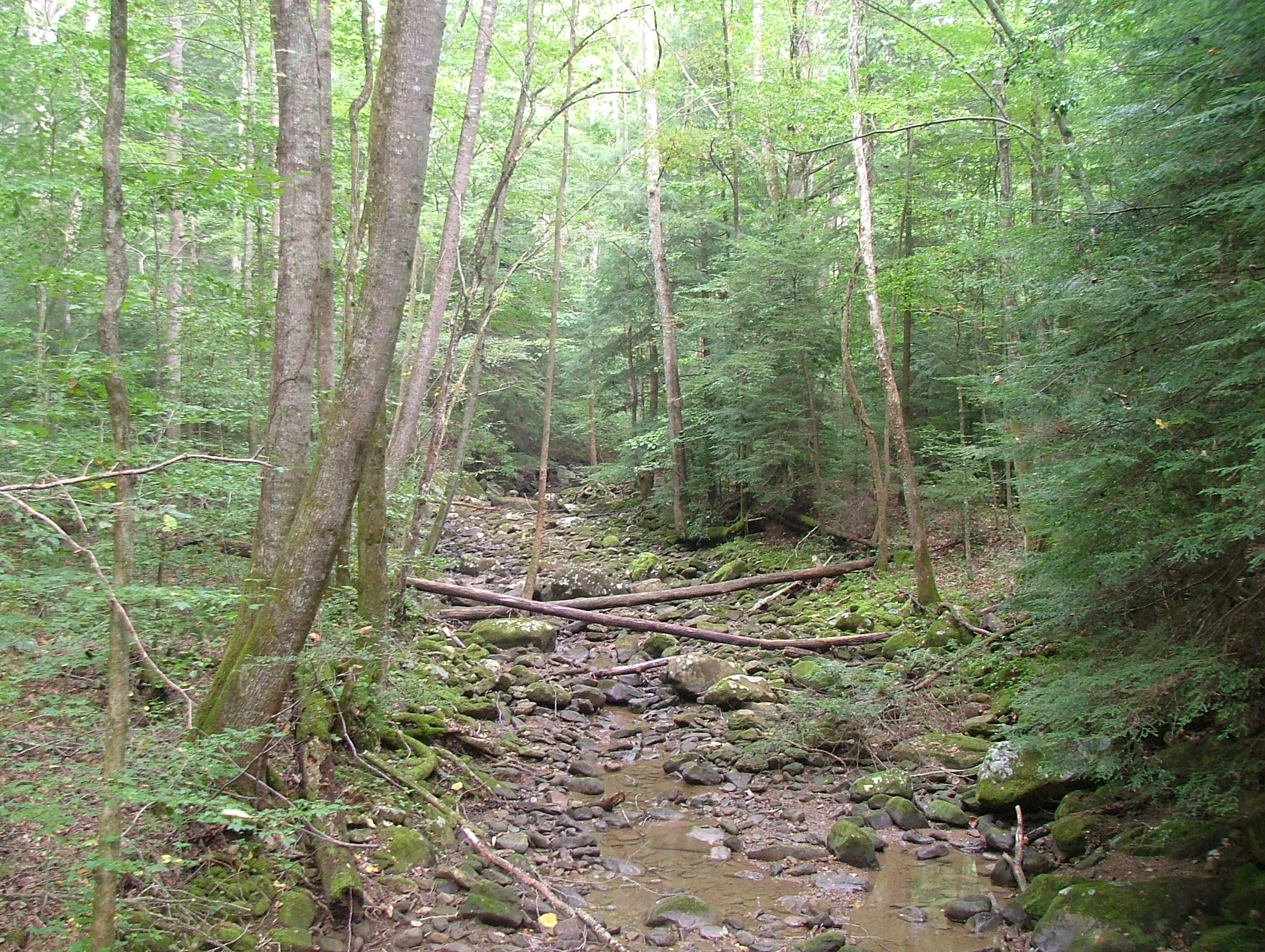
- The Judge Branch on the west side of Frozen Head
- Interactive map of Frozen Head State Park
- Type: Tennessee State Park
- Location: Wartburg, Tennessee
- Coordinates: 36.126°N 84.501°W
- Area: 24,000 acres (97.12 km^{2}; 37.50 sq mi)
- Operator: Tennessee Department of Environment and Conservation
- Open: Year round
- Website: Frozen Head State Park

Frozen Head State Park and Natural Area is a state park in Morgan County, Tennessee, in the southeastern United States. The park, situated in the Crab Orchard Mountains between the city of Wartburg and the community of Petros, contains some of the highest mountains in Tennessee west of the Blue Ridge Mountains.

Frozen Head State Park consists of approximately 24,000 acres (97 km^{2}), all but 330 acres (1.3 km^{2}) of which is classified as a state natural area. The terrain varies between 1,300 ft (400 m) to over 3,000 ft (910 m) with 14 peaks at or over 3,000 feet (910 m). Frozen Head, the park's namesake, is the highest peak at 3,324 feet (1,013 m). The mountain's name comes from its snow-capped appearance in colder months. The park's highest elevations allow for unobstructed views of East Tennessee's three main physiographic features: the Cumberland Plateau, the Tennessee Valley, and across the valley, the Great Smoky Mountains.

== Geography ==
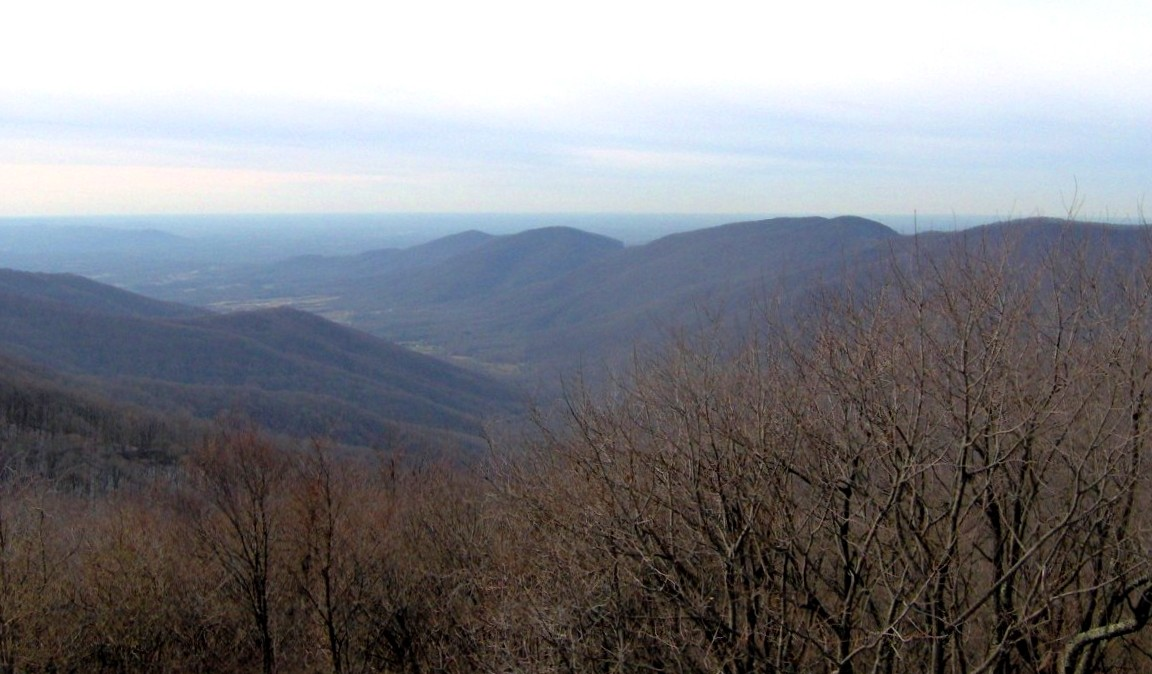
The Flat Fork Valley, looking west from the summit of Frozen Head

The Crab Orchard Mountains rise along the Cumberland Plateau just west of the plateau's Walden Ridge escarpment, north of the Sequatchie Valley, and comprise the southern extreme of the greater Cumberland Mountain range. The mountains are generally composed of Paleozoic sandstones and shales of the Pennsylvanian period, formed roughly 300 million years ago. Although the rocks are much younger than the Precambrian igneous rocks of the Appalachian Mountains to the east, the two mountain systems were both formed during the Appalachian orogeny, when the North American and African plates collided.

Frozen Head State Park is centered along the Flat Fork Valley, a bottomland between Bird Mountain and Old Mac Mountain. The valley's namesake, Flat Fork, rises on the southern slopes of Bird Mountain and follows the entire length of the mountain's southern base before emptying into Crooked Fork near Wartburg. Flat Fork, along with most streams in the park, is drained by the Emory River, the headwaters of which are located along Bird Mountain's northern slopes.

Frozen Head, the park's highest mountain, rises near the center of the park. The mountain crowns a ridge that rises from State Highway 62 to the south, peaks at Frozen Head, and maintains a relatively high ridgeline before intersecting Fork Mountain in the northern section of the park. Most of the park's major mountains run perpendicular to this central ridge.

== Frozen Head State Natural Area ==
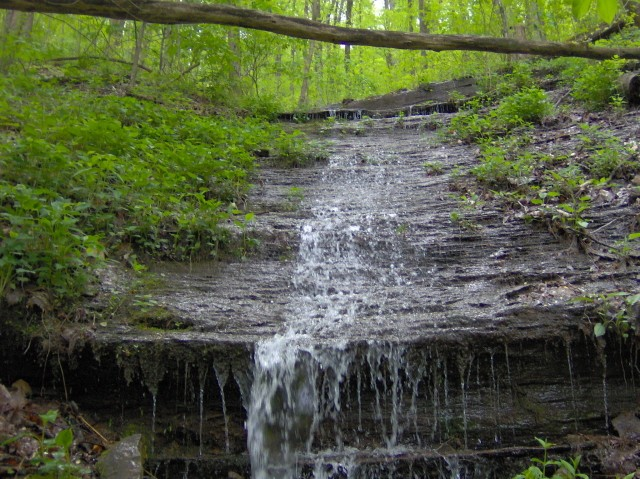
A stream on the north slope of Old Mac Mountain

In 1988, the vast majority of Frozen Head State Park's acreage was classified as a state natural area. The non-designated area consists of 330 acres (1.3 km^{2}) at the confluence of Flat Fork and Judge Branch where park offices and the campground are located. This designation, along with the park's previous designation as a state forest, have allowed a mature forest habitat to develop.

The forest in Frozen Head's lower elevations consists of a mixed mesophytic forest, and includes species of hemlock, maple, tulip poplar, oak, and hickory. As elevation increases along mountain slopes, the mesophytic forest gives way to an oak forest consisting largely of white oak and tulip poplar. Chestnut oak and shortleaf pine are the dominant species along the higher ridge crests and mountain tops.

== Park features ==
=== Mountains ===
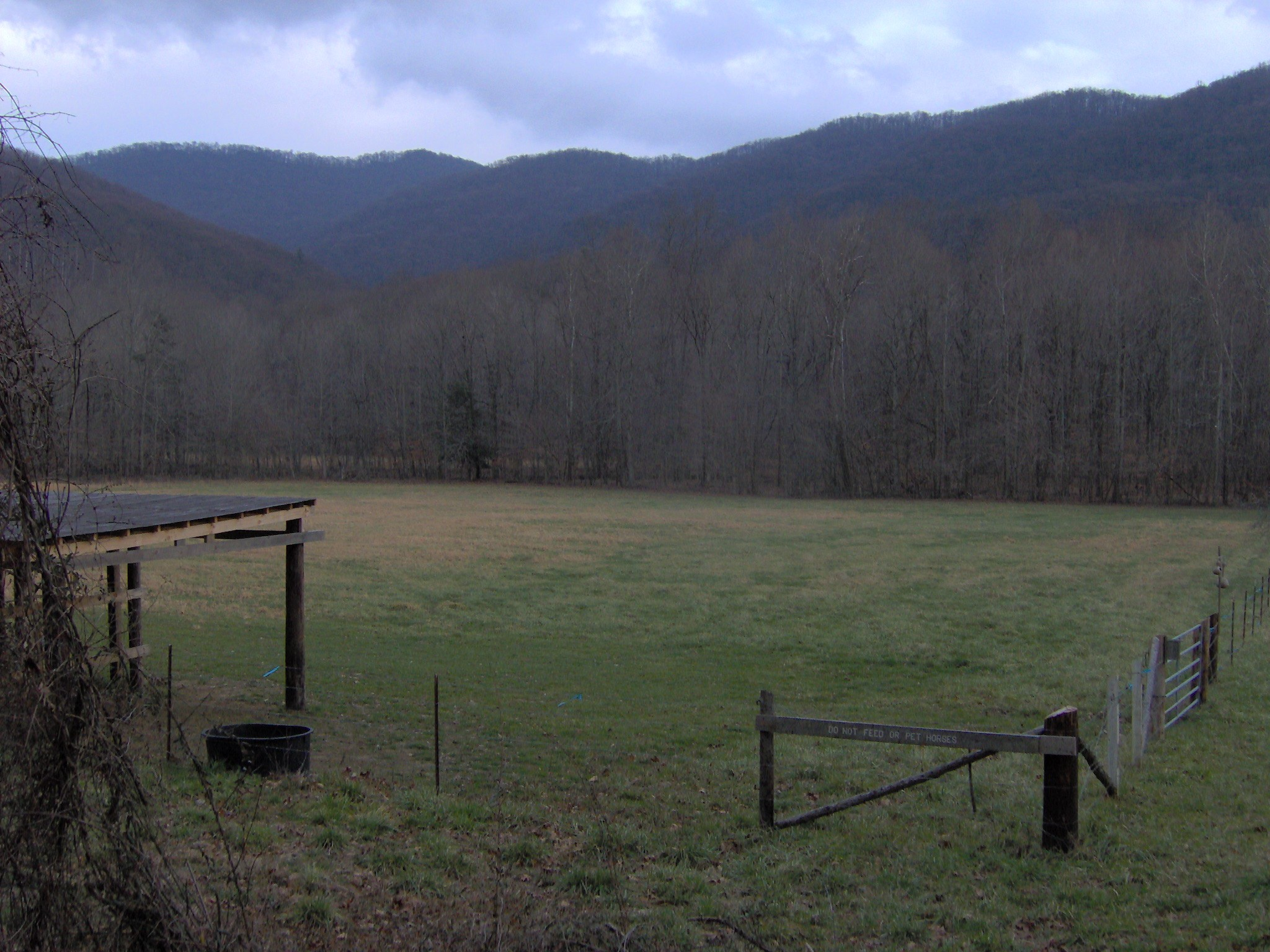
Mountains in the western section of Frozen Head State Park

Frozen Head— elevation 3,324 feet (1,013 m), located near the center of the park. Frozen Head consists of a long ridge that forms an amphitheater-like formation above the Stockstill Valley (occupied by Brushy Mountain State Penitentiary) with the summit at the north end and a subpeak known as Indian Knob (el. 3,054 feet (931 m)) at the south end.

Chimney Top Mountain— elevation 3,120 feet (950 m), located in the southwest corner of the park. Chimney Top Mountain is crowned by a series of steep sandstone caprocks. The highest caprock, at the summit, rises approximately 15–20 feet above the immediate ground. A rock shelter is located at the northern base of the summit caprock.

Bird Mountain— elevation 3,142 feet (958 m), located in the northwest section of the park. Bird Mountain stretches for roughly 7 miles (11 km) between its western base in Wartburg and its junction with Fork Mountain at Emory Gap. The source of the Emory River is located along the northern slopes of Bird Mountain, just below the mountain's summit.

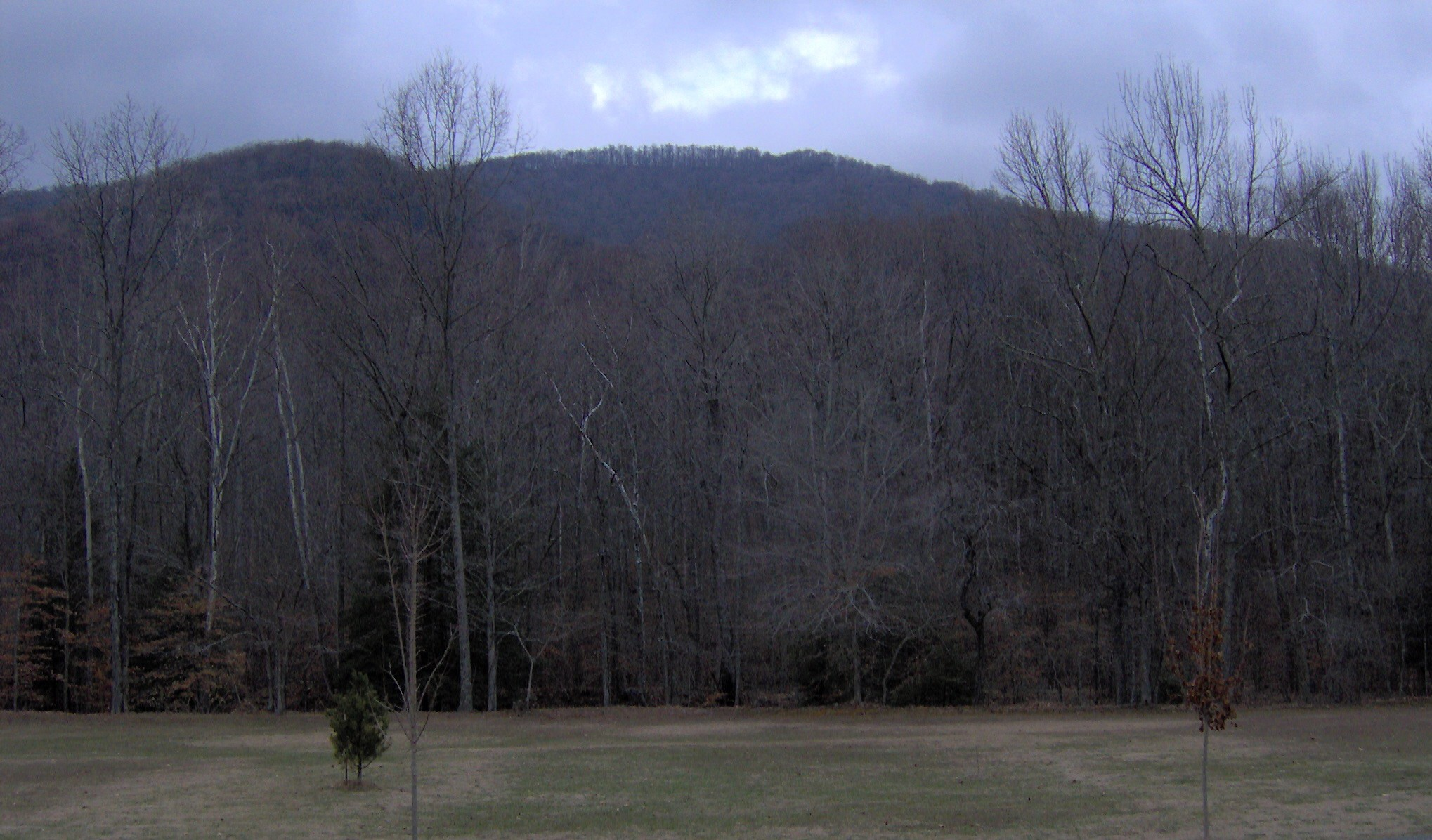
Bird Mountain

Old Mac Mountain— elevation 3,132 feet (955 m), located near the center of the park. The mountain rises from its base near the park offices in the Flat Fork Valley and stretches for nearly 5 miles (8.0 km) to its intersection with Frozen Head at Tub Springs Gap.

Mart Fields— elevation 3,132 feet (955 m), located in the southwest section of the park. Mart Fields consists of a relatively thinly-forested knob at the junction of Chimney Top Mountain and Frozen Head.

Significant mountains in the park's vicinity lying outside the park's boundaries include Big Brushy Mountain to the southeast, Big Fodderstack to the east, Fork Mountain and Buffalo Mountain (noted for its windmills) to the northeast, and Lone Mountain and Little Brushy Mountain to the southwest.

=== Waterfalls ===
Emory Gap Falls, a 25-foot (7.6 m) plunge waterfall amidst the headwaters of Flat Fork on the southeast slope of Bird Mountain.

DeBord Falls, a 12-foot (3.7 m) plunge waterfall along Panther Branch, just above the creek's confluence with Flat Fork.

=== Other features ===
Rock outcroppings— some of which form natural rock shelters— are common throughout the park, especially in higher elevations. The most substantial rock shelter is located near the summit of Frozen Head, and is accessible via short spur trail from the main tower trail. Abandoned prison mines between Frozen Head and Armes Gap and a CCC dynamite shack along the South Old Mac Mountain Trail are among the park's historical features.

== History ==
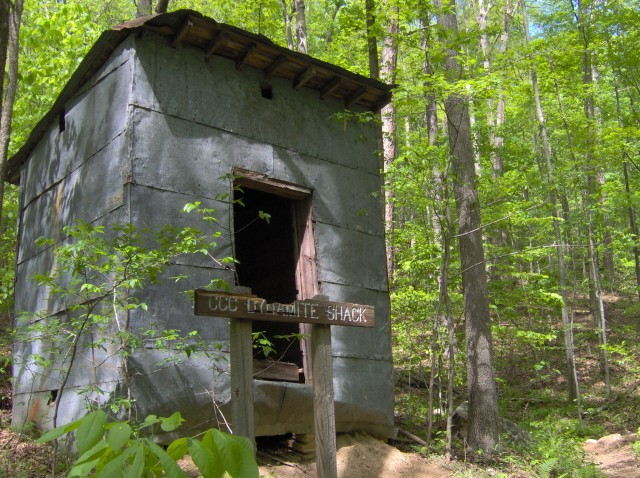
CCC dynamite shack along the South Old Mac Trail

What is now Frozen Head State Park was once part of the vast Cherokee hunting grounds that covered much of East Tennessee and southeastern Kentucky. The area was ceded to the United States government in 1805 with the signing of the Third Treaty of Tellico. The first Euro-American settlers arrived shortly thereafter, although they largely avoided the rugged mountains in favor of the more fertile bottomlands along the upper Emory River.

Although businesses occasionally purchased the Frozen Head area for its natural resources throughout the 19th-century, the area remained largely undisturbed until the state of Tennessee purchased it in 1894 for the location of Brushy Mountain State Prison. The state hoped to use convict labor to mine the Cumberlands' ample coal resources, with the heavy forest providing wood for construction of mine shafts. In 1911, the Emory River Lumber Company purchased the Frozen Head area and cut most of the forest's commercial timber. Major logging operations in the forest commenced in 1925.

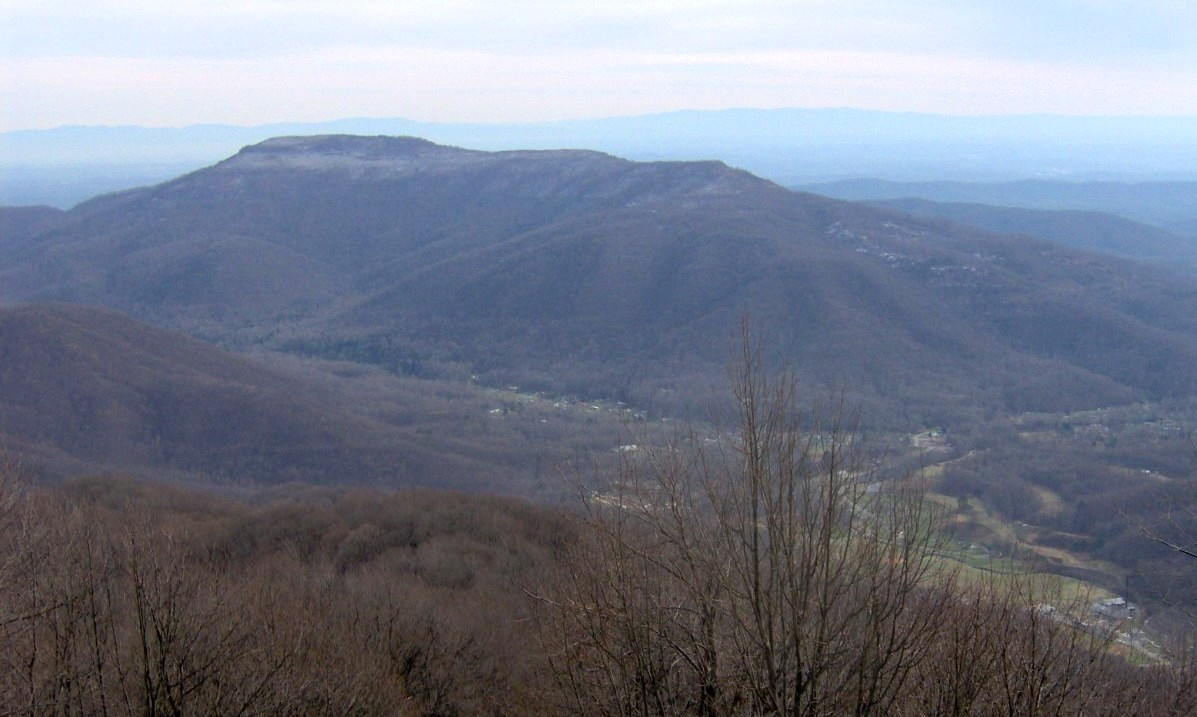
Big Brushy Mountain, looking east from Frozen Head

In 1933, Tennessee Governor Hill McAlister set aside a large part of Brushy Mountain State Prison's lands for the establishment of Morgan State Forest. The Civilian Conservation Corps arrived that same year to construct roads and facilities for forest maintenance. CCC operations continued in the forest until 1941, although rattlesnakes and prison escapes prevented the establishment of a camp within the forest until 1938.

A large part of Morgan State Forest burned in a forest fire in 1952, and the forestry division transferred the lands to the parks division 18 years later for the establishment of Frozen Head State Park. In 1988, most of park's acreage was classified as a state natural area, restricting development to a 330-acre (1.3 km^{2}) area around the confluence of Flat Fork and Judge Branch.

== Park facilities ==
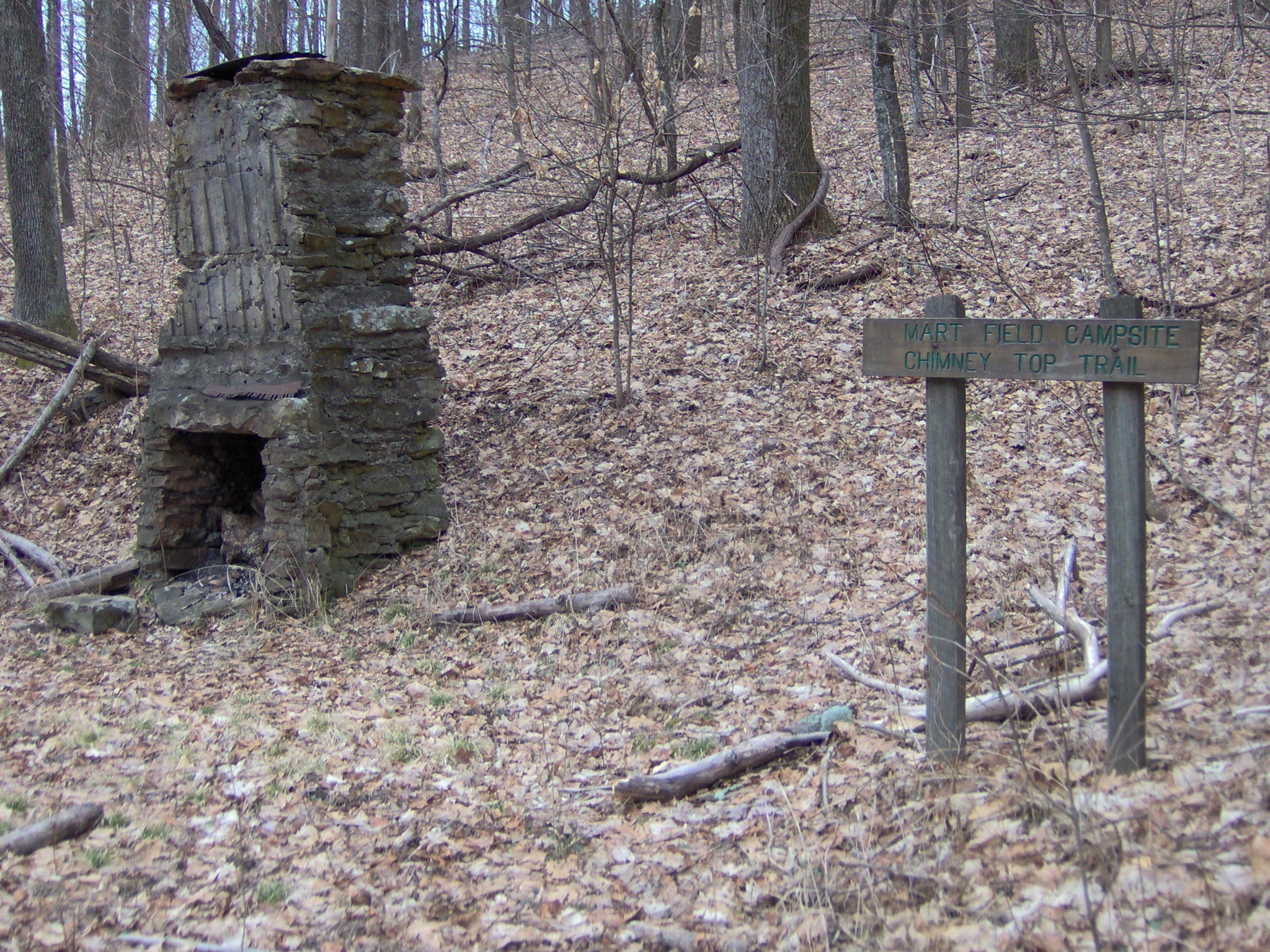
Mart Fields campsite

Frozen Head's developed area includes a campground with 20 campsites and a 75-person group campsite, a 240-person amphitheater, and several picnic areas and sports fields. Most major park facilities are located in the 330 acres (1.3 km^{2}) designated for development area in the Flat Fork Valley.

Eleven backcountry campsites are scattered throughout the park, most ranging between 1 and 4 miles (6.4 km) from the parking lot. The major backcountry sites are located at Tub Springs, Mart Fields, Chimney Tops, Panther Gap, and Bird Mountain.

=== The Frozen Head observation platform ===
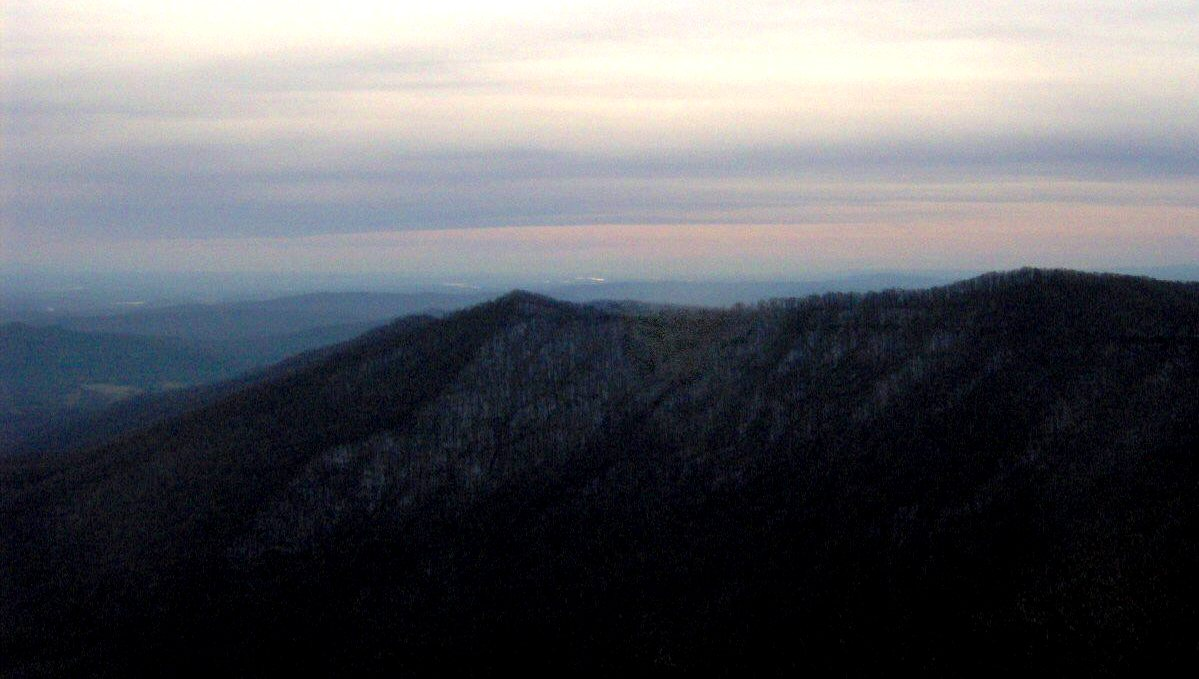
Indian Knob, looking south from Frozen Head

In 2006, the park replaced the aging CCC firetower at the summit of Frozen Head with an observation deck. The observation deck rises just above the treeline and allows for a 360-degree view of the surrounding terrain. The Great Smoky Mountains and the Tennessee Valley span the eastern horizon. Walden Ridge— where the Tennessee Valley meets the Cumberland Plateau— is visible to the south.

Fork Mountain dominates the view to the north and northeast, although the 360-foot (110 m) windmills of the Tennessee Valley Authority's Buffalo Mountain Wind Park are visible just beyond the mine-scarred mountain. Most of these windmills were built in 2004 as part of TVA's "Green Energy" initiative.

Big Fodderstack is visible immediately to the east, and Big Brushy Mountain lords above the community of Petros to the southeast. Brushy Mountain State Prison is visible through the treeline at the southeastern base of Frozen Head. Like Fork Mountain, Big Fodderstack and Big Brushy both bear substantial marks from strip mining, a coal extraction practice common in the Cumberland Mountains.

Indian Knob— the southern subpeak of Frozen Head Mountain— is visible immediately to the south. The peak is often silhouetted against the noon-day sun. Parts of the Watts Bar Lake impoundment of the Tennessee River are visible approximately 20 miles (32 km) to the south.

Mart Fields and Chimney Top Mountain are visible to the southwest. To the west, the Flat Fork Valley and the descending western flank of Bird Mountain dominate the view. The Wartburg area and the Obed River watershed are visible in the distance.

=== Hiking trails ===
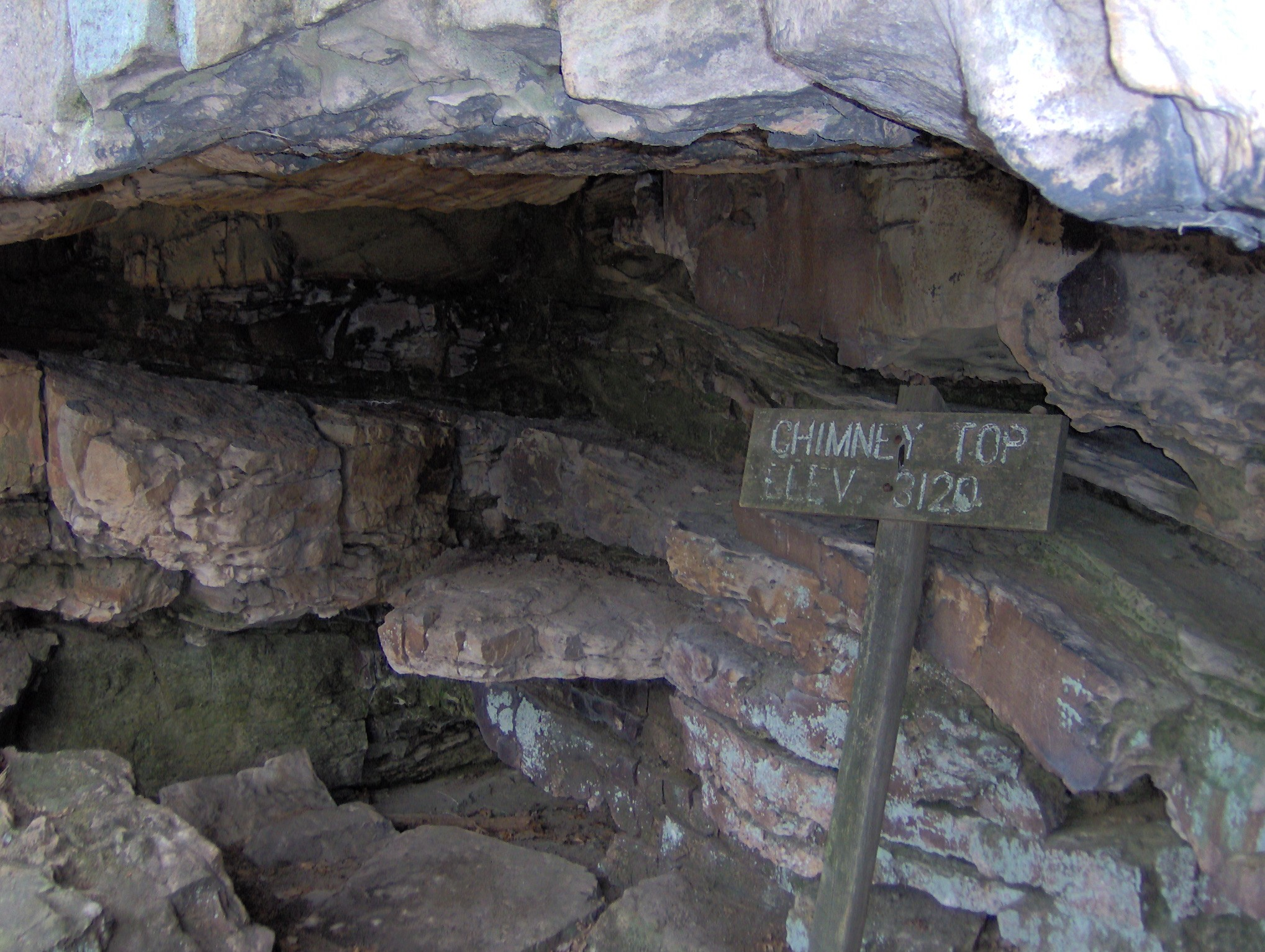
Rock shelter at the base of the summit caprock atop Chimney Top Mountain

Approximately 80 miles (130 km) of hiking trail connect the remote sections of Frozen Head State Park. Most of the trailheads are located near the park offices, with lesser-used trailheads located at Armes Gap (above Petros) and just off Highway 62 to the south. Most of the trails are open only to hiking, although mountain biking is allowed on the Lookout Tower Trail, which leads to the summit of Frozen Head.

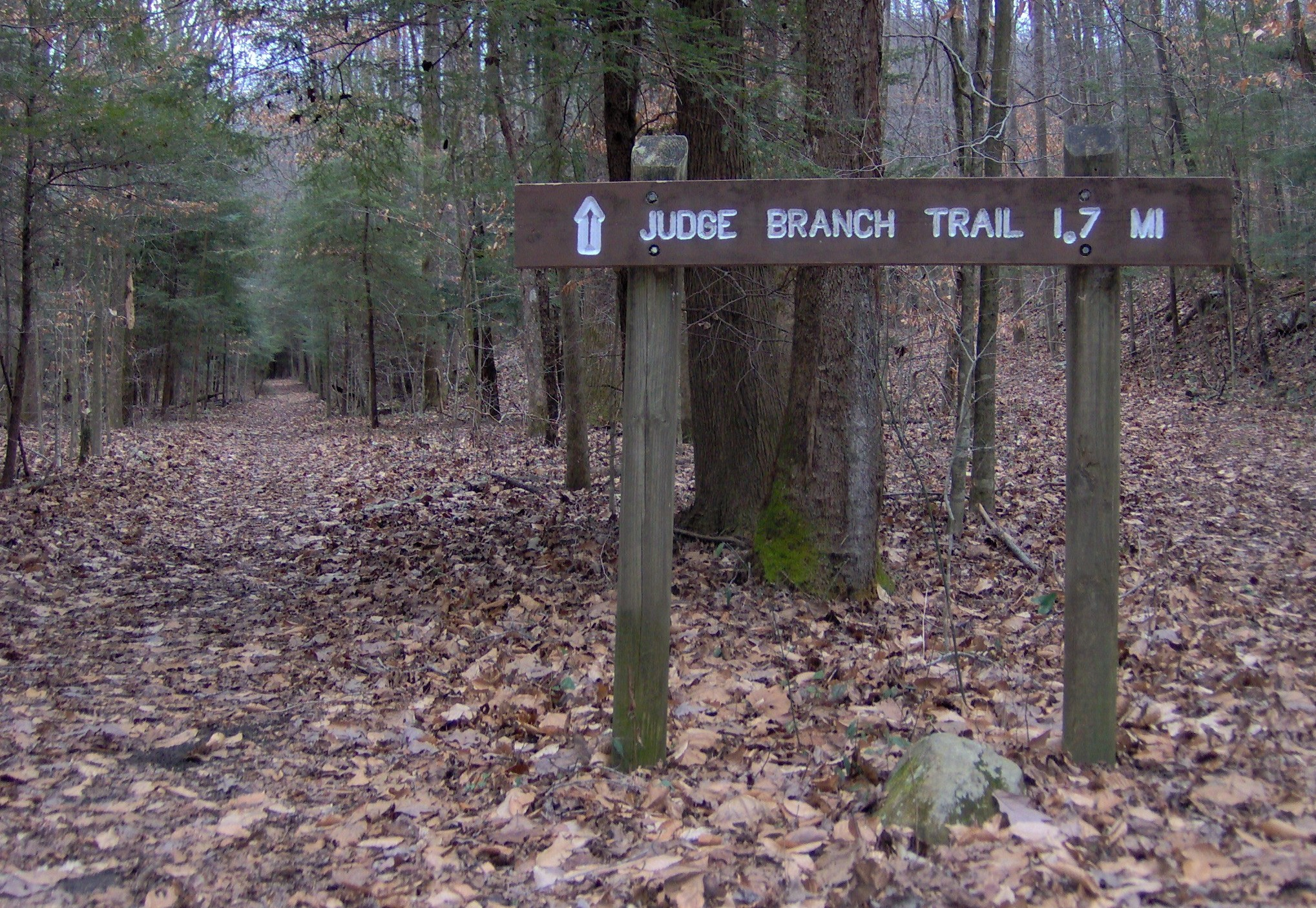
The Judge Branch Trailhead

The Chimney Top Trail connects the park offices with Frozen Head via Chimney Top Mountain. The trail rises along Rough Ridge, descends briefly to the Taylor Branch Valley, and ascends Chimney Top Mountain from the west. From the caprocks, the trail proceeds eastward across the ridge crest to Mart Fields. The caprocks are relatively steep and rise 15–20 feet above the trail, although they can be scaled without technical climbing gear.

Hiking trails ascend the north and south slopes of Old Mac Mountain and Bird Mountain, intersecting the main trail where the mountains intersect the main ridge. The Bird Mountain trailheads are located at the campground. The Old Mac Mountain trailheads are located along the interpretive trail, a short distance from the parking lot.

A section of the Cumberland Trail traverses the south slope of Bird Mountain (this section of the trail runs congruent with the South Bird Mountain Trail). When the trail is completed, the Cumberland Trail's Frozen Head segment will consist of a 20-mile (32 km) stretch connecting the Smoky Mountain segment (Smoky Mountain is north of Fork Mountain, not to be confused with the Great Smoky Mountains) to the northeast with the Obed River segment to the southwest.

=== Barkley Marathons ===
The Barkley Marathons is an unusual ultramarathon event that has been held annually in the park since 1986. Competitors are challenged to run a 100-mile (160 km) course in under 60 hours. The course is unmarked and traverses very rugged and brushy terrain. As of 2026, only twenty competitors have ever finished the race.
