= Annadel, Tennessee =

Unincorporated community in Tennessee, US

Coordinates: 36°10′36″N 84°39′57″W

Annadel (also spelled Annadell) is an unincorporated community in Morgan County, Tennessee, United States. Annadel is located on US 27 south of Sunbright.
