= Montgomery, Morgan County, Tennessee =

Coordinates: 36.113687°N 84.614385°W

Montgomery was a town in Morgan County, Tennessee.

The town served as the county seat of Morgan County from 1818 to 1870. It was originally located 13 miles west of Wartburg. In 1832, due to the formation of Fentress County, the town was rebuilt about 1.5 miles west of Wartburg. In 1870, the town property in Montgomery was sold and the county seat was moved to Wartburg.
