= WECO (AM) =

- Wartburg, Tennessee; United States
- Frequency: 940 kHz
- Branding: Solid Gospel

Programming
- Format: Christian (Southern gospel)
- Affiliations: Citadel Media, Motor Racing Network, Salem Radio Network

Ownership
- Owner: Morgan County Broadcasting Company, Inc.
- Sister stations: WECO-FM

Technical information
- Licensing authority: FCC
- Facility ID: 43778
- Class: D
- Power: 5,000 watts day 16 watts night
- Transmitter coordinates: 36°5′48.00″N 84°35′31.00″W
- Translators: W238CP (95.5 MHz, Wartburg)

Links
- Public license information: Public file; LMS
- Webcast: Listen live
- Website: Official website

WECO (940 AM, "Solid Gospel") is a radio station broadcasting a Christian radio format. Licensed to Wartburg, Tennessee, United States, the station is currently owned by Morgan County Broadcasting Company, Inc. and features programming from Citadel Media, Motor Racing Network and Salem Radio Network.
