= WECO-FM =

- Wartburg, Tennessee; United States
- Frequency: 101.3 MHz
- Branding: Today's Hot New Country

Programming
- Format: Country
- Affiliations: Citadel Media, Motor Racing Network

Ownership
- Owner: Morgan County Broadcasting Company, Inc.
- Sister stations: WECO

History
- Former call signs: WGTG (1988–1989)

Technical information
- Licensing authority: FCC
- Facility ID: 43775
- Class: C3
- ERP: 1.65 kilowatts
- HAAT: 317 meters (1,040 ft)
- Transmitter coordinates: 36°11′25.00″N 84°37′24.00″W

Links
- Public license information: Public file; LMS
- Webcast: Listen live
- Website: Official website

WECO-FM (101.3 FM, "Today's Hot New Country") is a radio station broadcasting a country music format. Licensed to Wartburg, Tennessee, United States, the station is currently owned by Morgan County Broadcasting Company, Inc. and features programming from the Motor Racing Network. The station has obtained a construction permit from the FCC for a power increase to 10,500 watts as a Class C2 station. Antenna height above average terrain would also be increased to 325 meters.

== History ==
The station was assigned the call sign WGTG on February 17, 1988. On April 24, 1989, the station changed its call sign to the current WECO-FM.
