= Wartburg, Tennessee =

City in the United States

- City
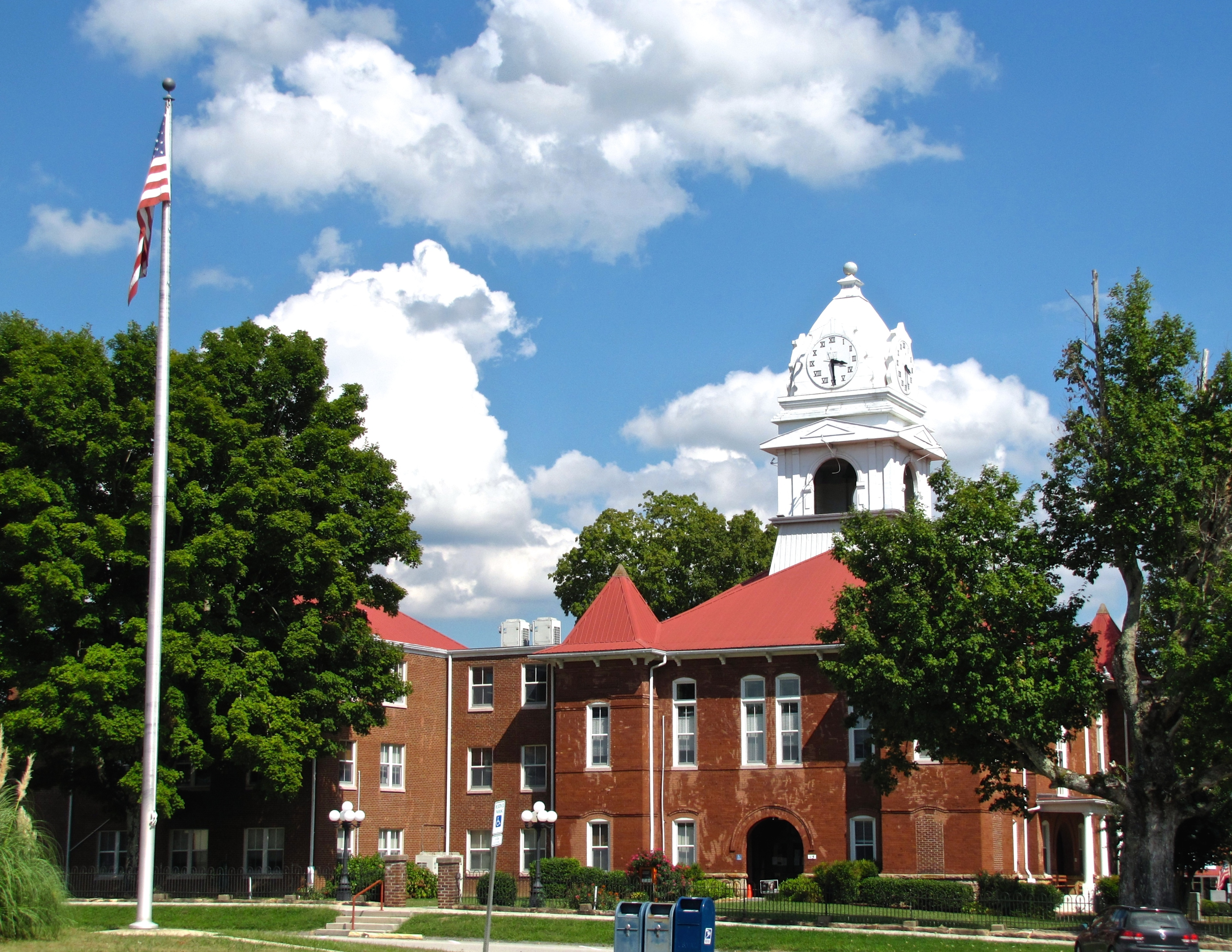
- Morgan County Courthouse in Wartburg

- Location of Wartburg in Morgan County, Tennessee.
- Coordinates: 36°6′14″N 84°35′11″W
- Country: United States
- State: Tennessee
- County: Morgan
- Established: 1840s
- Incorporated: 1968
- Named after: Wartburg Castle

Area
  - Total: 1.13 sq mi (2.92 km^{2})
  - Land: 1.13 sq mi (2.92 km^{2})
  - Water: 0 sq mi (0.00 km^{2})
- Elevation: 1,312 ft (400 m)

Population (2020)
  - Total: 848
  - Density: 752/sq mi (290.5/km^{2})
- Time zone: UTC-5 (Eastern (EST))
  - Summer (DST): UTC-4 (EDT)
- ZIP code: 37887
- Area code: 423
- FIPS code: 47-78100
- GNIS feature ID: 2405678
- Website: https://www.wartburgtn.org/

Wartburg is a city in and the county seat of Morgan County, Tennessee, United States. As of the 2020 census, Wartburg had a population of 848.

== History ==
In 1805, the Cherokee ceded what is now Morgan County to the United States by signing the Third Treaty of Tellico. The first settlers arrived in the area shortly thereafter.

Wartburg was founded in the mid-1840s by Georg Friedrich Gerding (later anglicized as George Frederick), a land speculator who bought up large tracts of land in what is now Morgan County and organized the East Tennessee Colonization Company with plans to establish a series of German colonies in the Cumberland region.

Born in Germany in 1800, he became a successful businessman after moving to New York. He was decorated by Belgium King Leopold I for establishing the first ship line between Antwerp and New York. He was U.S. Consul to Baden-Baden 1845-47. Acquiring 300,000 acres of land, he established the East Tennessee Land Colonization Co. for Swiss, German, and French immigrants. In 1844, he founded Wartburg, and gave land for the town square, a church, and a cemetery. He died in 1884.

German and Swiss immigrants, seeking to escape poor economic conditions in their home counties, arrived at the site by traveling from New Orleans up the Mississippi and Cumberland rivers to Nashville, and then by ox cart to the Cumberland Plateau. The first of these settlers arrived in the area in 1845, and new groups of immigrants would continue trickling in until 1855.

The new settlement, which had already been platted by East Tennessee Colonization Company agent Friedrich Guenther, was named after Wartburg Castle in Germany.

“The city was named after the German Wartburg, where Martin Luther translated the New Testament and parts of the Old Testament into German.”

The first six streets were initially named for European cities, but the names were changed within a few years to Rose, Church, Maidenland (now Maiden), Kingston, Mill, and Cumberland. As most immigrants lived on farms outside the town, Wartburg grew slowly. By 1850, the town consisted of Gerding's house and store, a church and school building, a doctor's office, and a few small houses. Early residents included a number of professionals trained in Europe, including architect Carl Rothe, musician Gustav Knabe, painter George Dury, and physicians Rudolf Knaffl and F. A. Sienknecht. Gerding and the retired German officer Friedrich Karl Georg Freiherr von Forstner (1800–1861), who arrived with his family in 1847 and bought 1,500 acres, were the largest landowners.

While Morgan County was generally pro-Union during the Civil War, Wartburg was bitterly divided over the secession issue. Gerding, the city's founder, supported the Confederacy. John Wilken, a prominent Lutheran pastor in the city, supported the Union. F.A. Sienknecht supported the Union, though two of his sons fought for the Confederacy. On January 2, 1862, a Confederate cavalry unit under Colonel J.W. White clashed with the Union Home Guard near Wartburg. In late March 1862, Confederate General Kirby Smith reported that all Confederate citizens had been expelled from the Wartburg area. In June 1863, Union General William P. Sanders marched through Wartburg and captured 104 Confederate soldiers in the vicinity.

In 1870, Morgan County elected to move its county seat from the now-defunct town of Montgomery, which had a population of just 50 residents and had been economically overshadowed by Wartburg. A new courthouse, consisting of a simple frame structure, was completed in 1871. The current Richardsonian Romanesque-style courthouse was built in 1904.

By the early 20th century, Wartburg had grown modestly, reporting a population of about 500 in 1920. At this time, the city included a bank, school, newspaper, four general stores, a clothing store, a hardware store, and a billiard hall. In 1968, Wartburg voted to incorporate, and elected Roy McNeal as its mayor.

== Geography ==
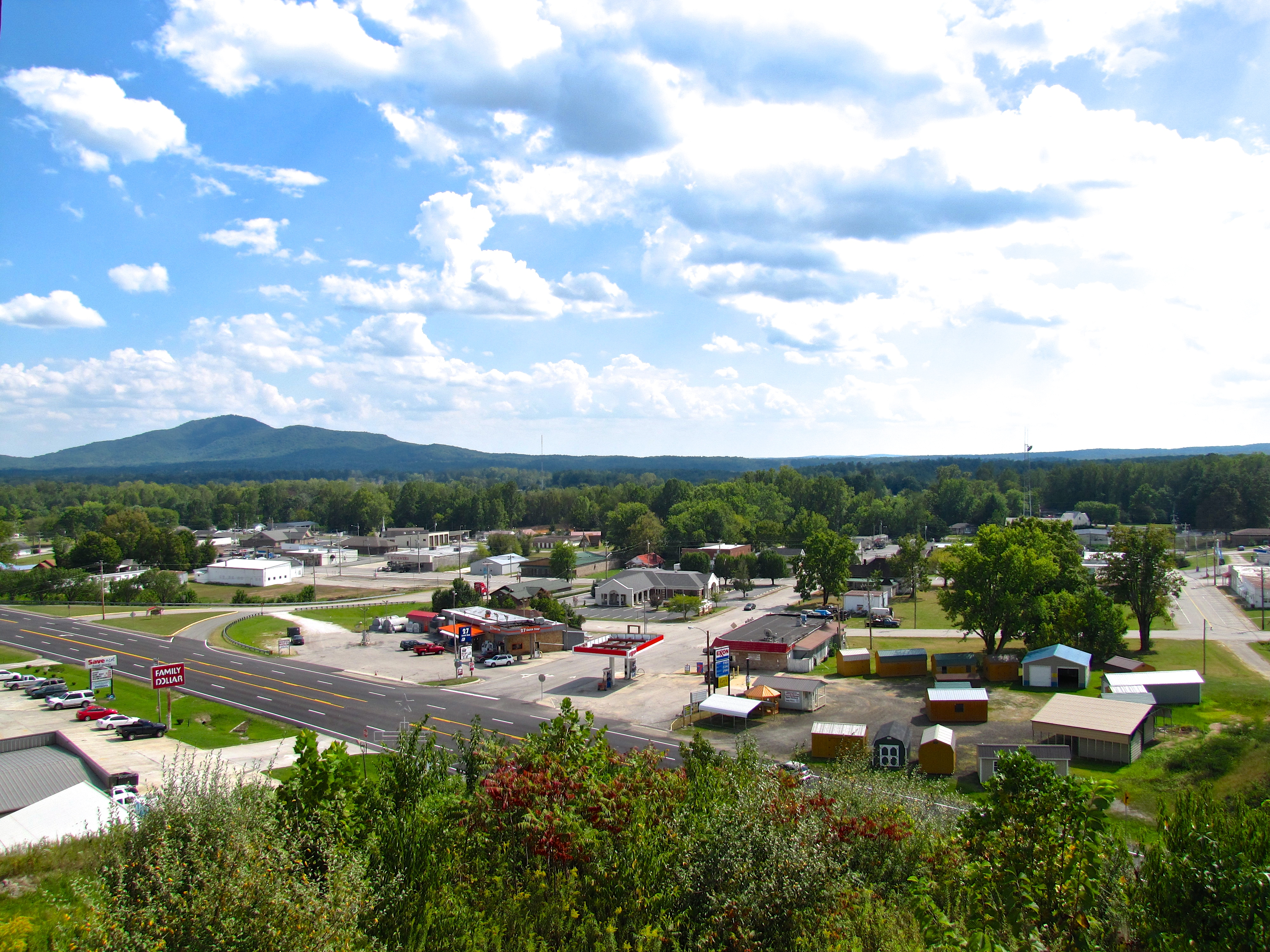
View of Wartburg with Lone Mountain on the left

Wartburg is situated amidst the Crab Orchard Mountains, a sub-range of the Cumberland Mountains, near the eastern edge of the Cumberland Plateau. Bird Mountain dominates the area east of Wartburg, rising from its base at the edge of the city and stretching for some 10 miles (16 km) to its 3,142-foot (958 m) summit at Frozen Head State Park. The Emory River, its source near the summit of Bird, flows westwardly along the mountain's northern base, passing just north of Wartburg, and turning south before dropping off the plateau and emptying into the Watts Bar Lake impoundment of the Tennessee River. The Obed River flows eastwardly from Cumberland County through a scenic gorge before emptying into the Emory just west of Wartburg.

Wartburg is situated around the junction of U.S. Route 27, which connects the city to Kentucky to the north and Harriman and Interstate 40 to the south, and State Route 62, which connects Wartburg to Oak Ridge to the east and the rural areas of Morgan County and Fentress County to the west.

According to the United States Census Bureau, the city has a total area of 1.0 square mile (2.6 km^{2}), all of it land.

== Demographics ==
Historical population
Census	Pop.	Note	%±
1880	150		—
1890	206		37.3%
1970	541		—
1980	761		40.7%
1990	932		22.5%
2000	890		−4.5%
2010	918		3.1%
2020	848		−7.6%

=== Racial and ethnic composition ===
Racial composition as of the 2020 census
Race	Number	Percent
White	764	90.1%
Black or African American	12	1.4%
American Indian and Alaska Native	8	0.9%
Asian	12	1.4%
Native Hawaiian and Other Pacific Islander	0	0.0%
Some other race	24	2.8%
Two or more races	28	3.3%
Hispanic or Latino (of any race)	42	5.0%

=== 2020 census ===
As of the 2020 census, Wartburg had a population of 848. The median age was 44.1 years, 20.6% of residents were under the age of 18, and 23.5% of residents were 65 years of age or older. For every 100 females there were 104.8 males, and for every 100 females age 18 and over there were 100.9 males age 18 and over.

0.0% of residents lived in urban areas, while 100.0% lived in rural areas.

There were 333 households in Wartburg, of which 28.2% had children under the age of 18 living in them. Of all households, 30.0% were married-couple households, 22.2% were households with a male householder and no spouse or partner present, and 41.4% were households with a female householder and no spouse or partner present. About 43.8% of all households were made up of individuals and 20.1% had someone living alone who was 65 years of age or older.

There were 380 housing units, of which 12.4% were vacant. The homeowner vacancy rate was 1.6% and the rental vacancy rate was 7.3%.

=== 2000 census ===
As of the census of 2000, there was a population of 890, with 363 households and 197 families residing in the city. The population density was 929.3 inhabitants per square mile (358.8/km^{2}). There were 394 housing units at an average density of 411.4 per square mile (158.8/km^{2}). The racial makeup of the city was 97.19% White, 0.67% African American, 0.11% Native American, 0.22% Asian, 0.11% from other races, and 1.69% from two or more races. Hispanic or Latino of any race were 1.46% of the population.

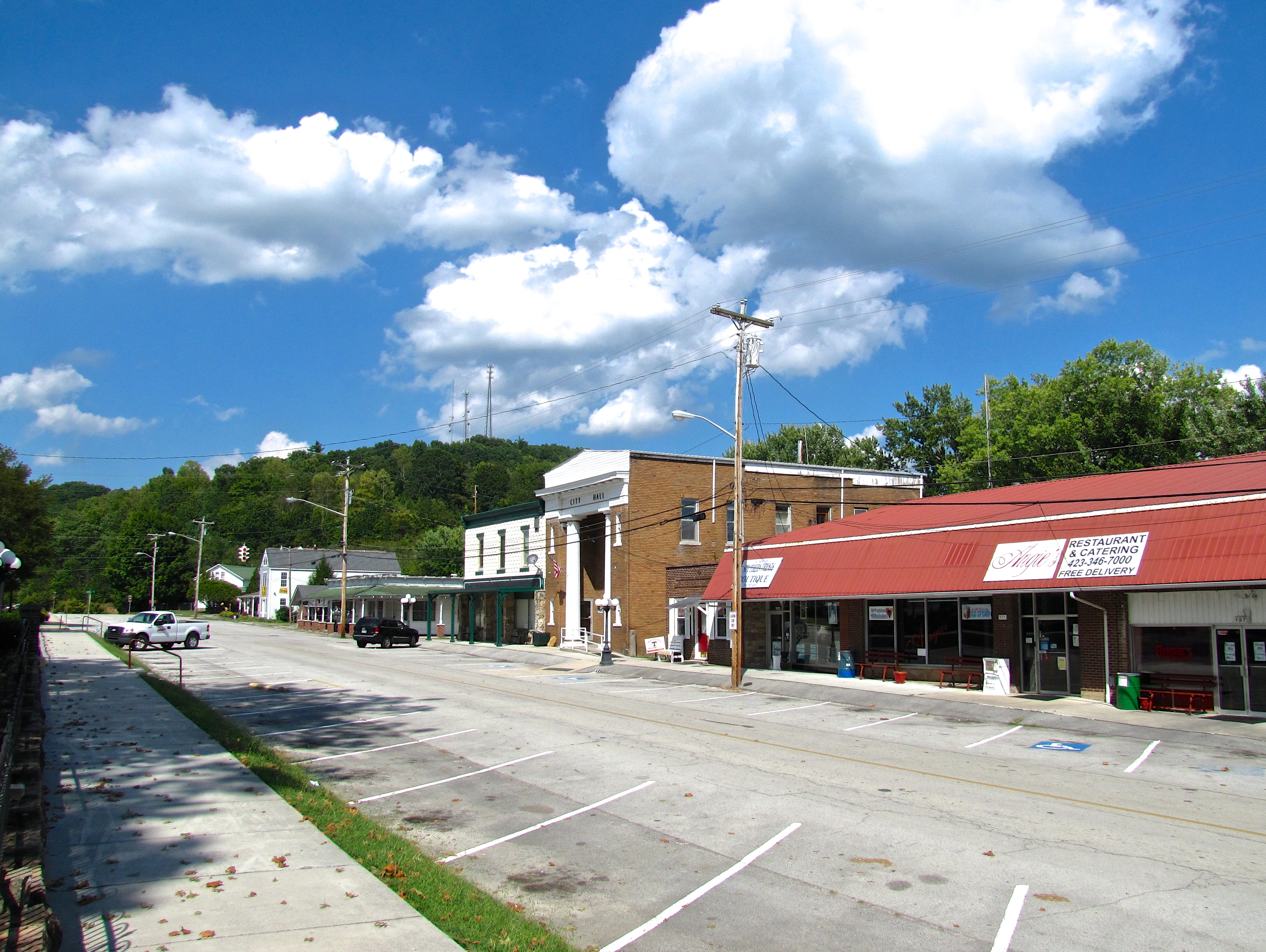
Kingston Street in Wartburg

There were 363 households, out of which 29.2% had children under the age of 18 living with them, 35.5% were married couples living together, 16.0% had a female householder with no husband present, and 45.7% were non-families. 43.3% of all households were made up of individuals, and 21.2% had someone living alone who was 65 years of age or older. The average household size was 2.12 and the average family size was 2.95.

In the city, the population was spread out, with 23.0% under the age of 18, 7.3% from 18 to 24, 21.6% from 25 to 44, 20.4% from 45 to 64, and 27.6% who were 65 years of age or older. The median age was 42 years. For every 100 females, there were 72.8 males. For every 100 females age 18 and over, there were 62.3 males.

The median income for a household in the city was $19,722, and the median income for a family was $37,917. Males had a median income of $32,708 versus $22,143 for females. The per capita income for the city was $12,252. About 24.5% of families and 29.8% of the population were below the poverty line, including 39.1% of those under age 18 and 19.1% of those age 65 or over.

== Recreation ==
Today, Wartburg is the headquarters for the Obed Wild and Scenic River (managed by the National Park Service), Frozen Head State Park, and Lone Mountain State Forest. The Catoosa Wildlife Management Area is located immediately to the west, and the Big South Fork National River and Recreation Area is located several miles to the north.

== Notable residents ==
- Joseph Knaffl (1861–1938), photographer

== See also ==
- WECO (AM)
- WECO-FM
- Wartburg Presbyterian Church
