= Petros, Tennessee =

- Census-designated place
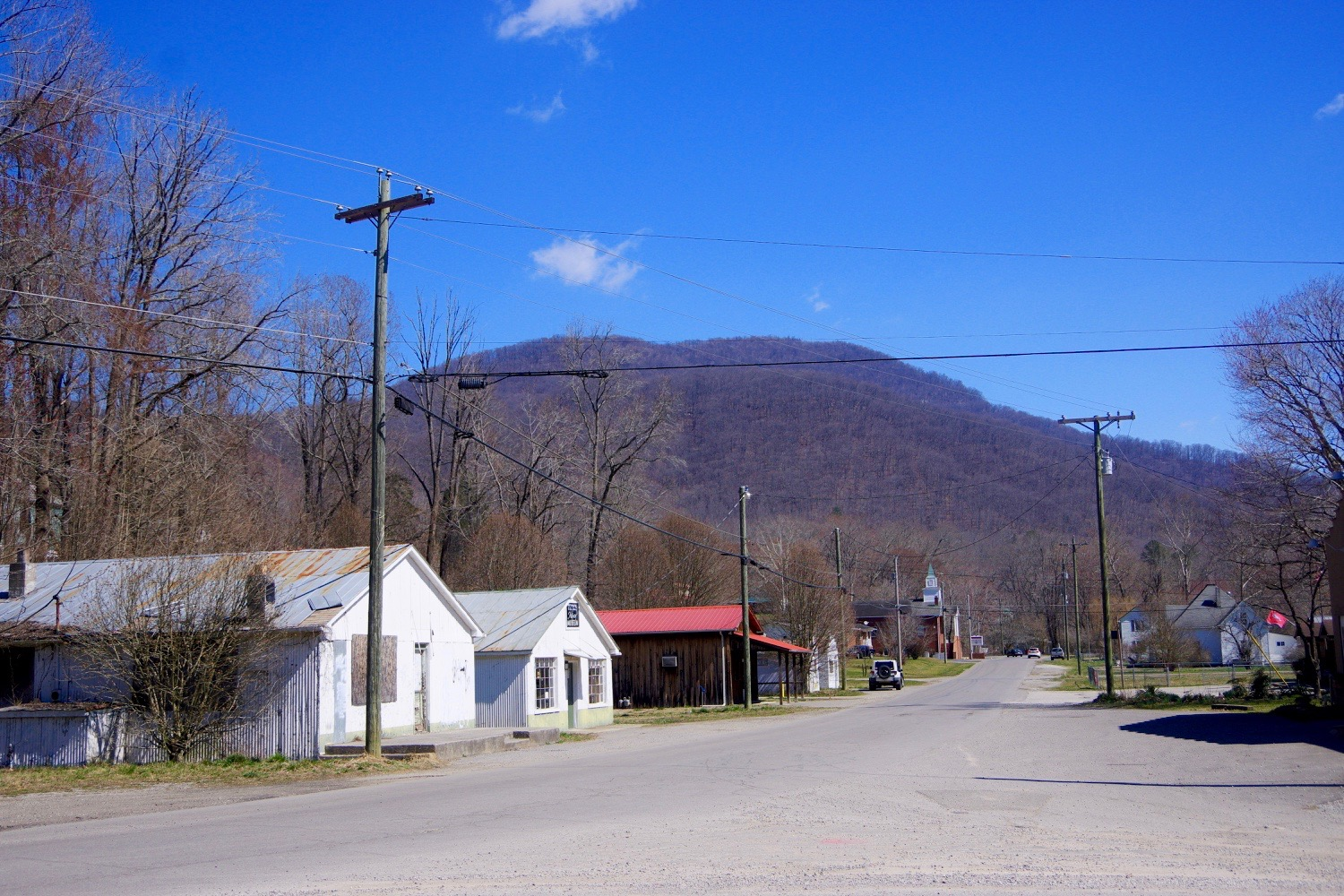
- Main Street

- Location within Tennessee
- Coordinates: 36°06′10″N 84°27′01″W
- Country: United States
- State: Tennessee
- County: Morgan

Area
  - Total: 3.94 sq mi (10.20 km^{2})
  - Land: 3.94 sq mi (10.20 km^{2})
  - Water: 0 sq mi (0.00 km^{2})
- Elevation: 1,437 ft (438 m)

Population (2020)
  - Total: 459
  - Density: 116.5/sq mi (44.98/km^{2})
- Time zone: UTC-5 (Eastern (EST))
  - Summer (DST): UTC-4 (EDT)
- ZIP code: 37845
- Area code: 423
- GNIS feature ID: 2586077

Petros (/piːˈtrɒs/ pee-TROSS) is an unincorporated community and census-designated place (CDP) in Morgan County, Tennessee, United States, located on State Route 116. Its population was 459 at the 2020 census. Petros has its own post office, with the ZIP code 37845.

Petros is historically a coal mining town and is the site of the Historic Brushy Mountain State Penitentiary tourist attraction opened in 2018 on the site of the former prison. Some of the town and coal mine scenes for the movie October Sky were filmed there.

== Demographics ==
Historical population
Census	Pop.	Note	%±
2010	583		—
2020	459		−21.3%
U.S. Decennial Census
