= Morgan County, Tennessee =

County in Tennessee, United States

- County
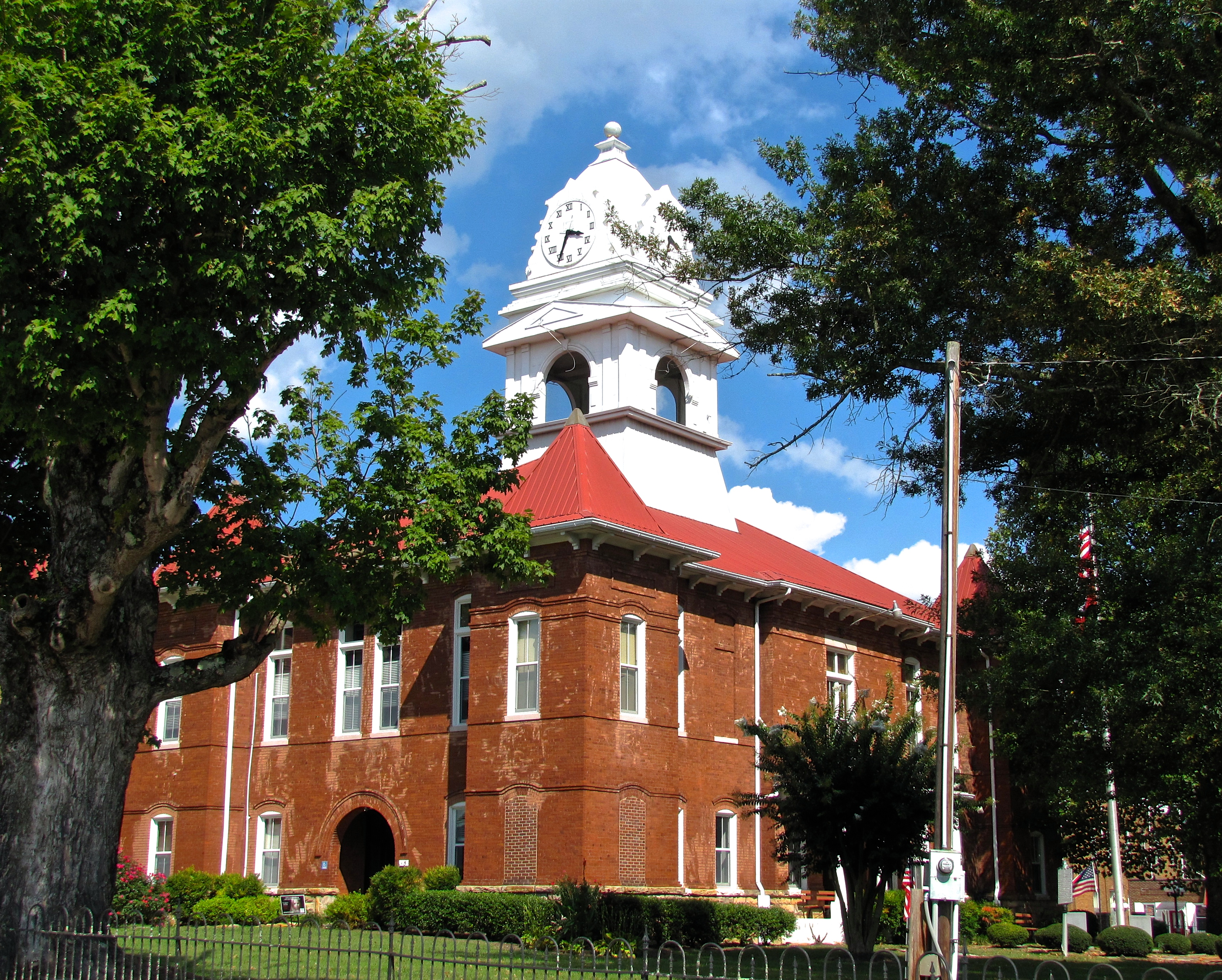
- Morgan County Courthouse in Wartburg

- Location within the U.S. state of Tennessee
- Coordinates: 36°08′N 84°38′W
- Country: United States
- State: Tennessee
- Founded: 1817
- Named for: Daniel Morgan
- Seat: Wartburg
- Largest community: Coalfield

Area
  - Total: 522 sq mi (1,350 km^{2})
  - Land: 522 sq mi (1,350 km^{2})
  - Water: 0.3 sq mi (0.78 km^{2}) 0.06%

Population (2020)
  - Total: 21,035
  - Estimate (2025): 22,160 ▲
  - Density: 42/sq mi (16/km^{2})
- Time zone: UTC−5 (Eastern)
  - Summer (DST): UTC−4 (EDT)
- Congressional district: 3rd
- Website: www.morgancountytn.gov

Morgan County is a county located in the U.S. state of Tennessee. As of the 2020 census, the population was 21,035. Its county seat is Wartburg. Morgan County is part of the Knoxville, TN Combined Statistical Area.

== History ==
Morgan County was formed in 1817 from portions of Anderson and Roane counties. It was named in honor of Daniel Morgan (1736–1802), an American Revolutionary War officer who commanded the troops that defeated the British at the Battle of Cowpens, and who later served as a U.S. congressman from Virginia. The county had been part of lands relinquished by the Cherokee with the signing of the Third Treaty of Tellico in 1805. The original county seat was Montgomery until 1870, when it was moved to Wartburg.

=== Tornado ===
On November 10, 2002, a tornado destroyed 50 homes. At least seven people were killed in the Morgan County communities of Mossy Grove and Joyner.

== Geography ==
According to the U.S. Census Bureau, the county has a total area of 522 square miles (1,350 km^{2}), of which 522 square miles (1,350 km^{2}) is land and 0.3 square miles (0.78 km^{2}) (0.06%) is water. The county, which lies on the eastern edge of the Cumberland Plateau, is known for its rugged mountain terrain, and cold mountain streams and rivers. The Crab Orchard Mountains comprise a large area of the county, which includes several designated wilderness areas, Frozen Head State Park, and Lone Mountain State Forest.

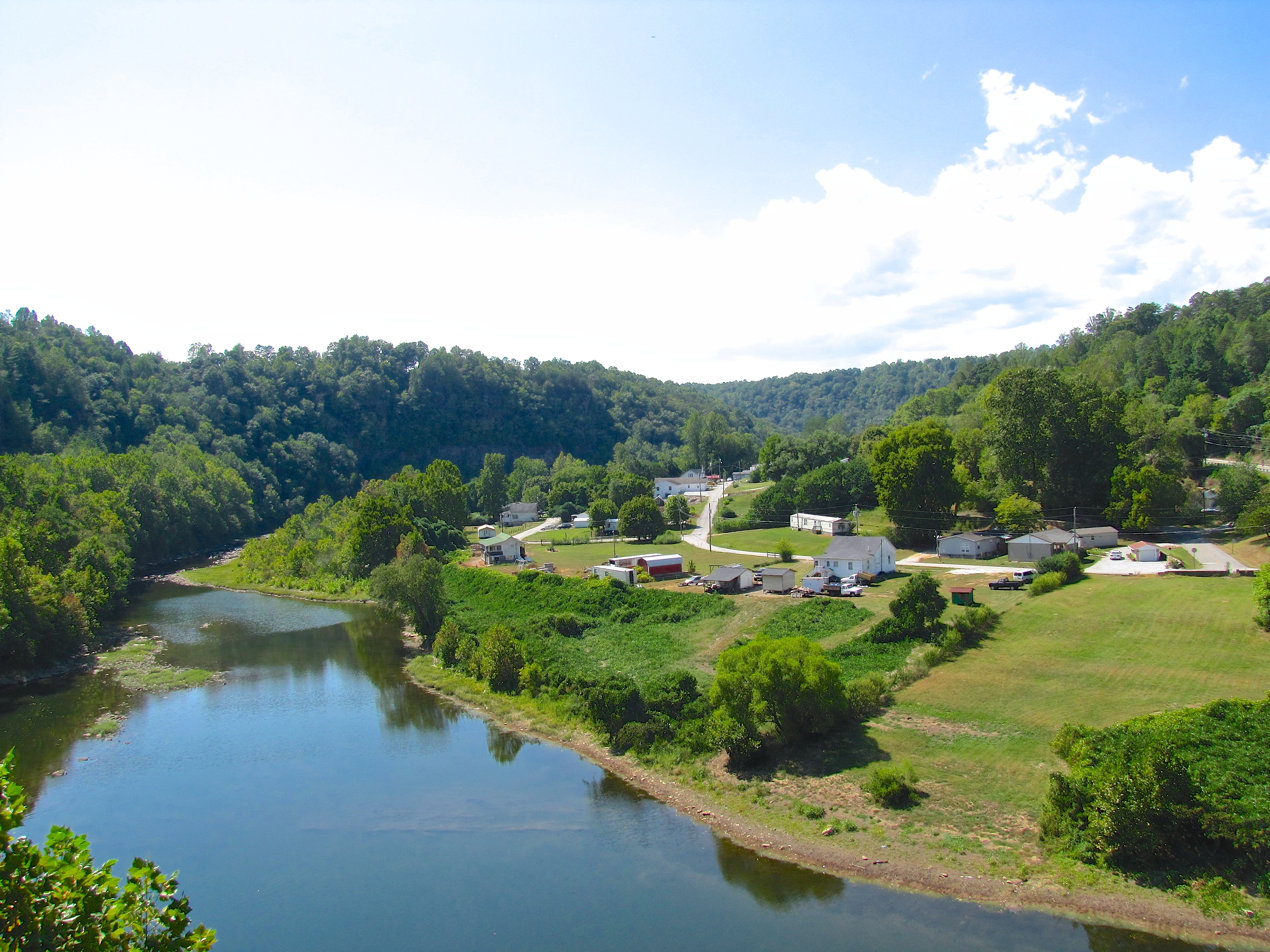
Emory River at Oakdale

The Emory River rises on the slopes of Bird Mountain near Wartburg. The Obed River, a designated national wild and scenic river, empties into the Emory southwest of Wartburg. The Clear Fork, which forms part of Morgan's boundary with Fentress County, joins the New River in Scott County to the north to form the Big South Fork of the Cumberland River.

Morgan County is in the Eastern Time Zone, but Cumberland and Fentress counties that border it on the west observe Central Time Zone.

The Cumberland Trail passes through Morgan County.

=== Adjacent counties ===
- Scott County (northeast)
- Anderson County (east)
- Roane County (south)
- Cumberland County (southwest)
- Fentress County (northwest)

=== National protected areas ===
- Big South Fork National River and Recreation Area (part)
- Obed Wild and Scenic River (part)

=== State protected areas ===
- Catoosa Wildlife Management Area (part)
- Frozen Head State Natural Area
- Frozen Head State Park
- Justin P. Wilson Cumberland Trail State Park
- Lone Mountain State Forest
- North Cumberland Wildlife Management Area (part)
- Rugby State Natural Area

== Demographics ==
Historical population
Census	Pop.	Note	%±
1820	1,676		—
1830	2,582		54.1%
1840	2,660		3.0%
1850	3,430		28.9%
1860	3,353		−2.2%
1870	2,969		−11.5%
1880	5,156		73.7%
1890	7,639		48.2%
1900	9,587		25.5%
1910	11,458		19.5%
1920	13,285		15.9%
1930	13,603		2.4%
1940	15,242		12.0%
1950	15,727		3.2%
1960	14,304		−9.0%
1970	13,619		−4.8%
1980	16,604		21.9%
1990	17,300		4.2%
2000	19,757		14.2%
2010	21,987		11.3%
2020	21,035		−4.3%
2025 (est.)	22,160	▲	5.3%
U.S. Decennial Census; 1790-1960 1900-1990; 1990-2000 2010-2014

=== Racial and ethnic composition ===
Morgan County, Tennessee – Racial and ethnic composition Note: the US Census treats Hispanic/Latino as an ethnic category. This table excludes Latinos from the racial categories and assigns them to a separate category. Hispanics/Latinos may be of any race.
Race / Ethnicity (NH = Non-Hispanic)	Pop 1980	Pop 1990	Pop 2000	Pop 2010	Pop 2020	% 1980	% 1990	% 2000	% 2010	% 2020
White alone (NH)	16,378	16,907	19,016	20,638	19,029	98.64%	97.73%	96.25%	93.86%	90.46%
Black or African American alone (NH)	118	263	440	803	971	0.71%	1.52%	2.23%	3.65%	4.62%
Native American or Alaska Native alone (NH)	17	45	40	65	54	0.10%	0.26%	0.20%	0.30%	0.26%
Asian alone (NH)	19	24	23	38	41	0.11%	0.14%	0.12%	0.17%	0.19%
Native Hawaiian or Pacific Islander alone (NH)	x	x	1	6	8	x	x	0.01%	0.03%	0.04%
Other race alone (NH)	11	1	12	1	64	0.07%	0.01%	0.06%	0.00%	0.30%
Mixed race or Multiracial (NH)	x	x	105	248	569	x	x	0.53%	1.13%	2.71%
Hispanic or Latino (any race)	61	60	120	188	299	0.37%	0.35%	0.61%	0.86%	1.42%
Total	16,604	17,300	19,757	21,987	21,035	100.00%	100.00%	100.00%	100.00%	100.00%

=== 2020 census ===
As of the 2020 census, the county had a population of 21,035, 7,457 households, and 5,659 families. The median age was 43.0 years, with 19.7% of residents under the age of 18 and 18.6% of residents who were 65 years of age or older. For every 100 females there were 120.9 males, and for every 100 females age 18 and over there were 124.9 males age 18 and over.

The racial makeup of the county was 90.9% White, 4.6% Black or African American, 0.3% American Indian and Alaska Native, 0.2% Asian, <0.1% Native Hawaiian and Pacific Islander, 0.8% from some other race, and 3.1% from two or more races. Hispanic or Latino residents of any race comprised 1.4% of the population.

<0.1% of residents lived in urban areas, while 100.0% lived in rural areas.

There were 7,457 households in the county, of which 29.1% had children under the age of 18 living in them. Of all households, 52.4% were married-couple households, 17.7% were households with a male householder and no spouse or partner present, and 23.9% were households with a female householder and no spouse or partner present. About 25.2% of all households were made up of individuals and 13.0% had someone living alone who was 65 years of age or older.

There were 8,502 housing units, of which 12.3% were vacant. Among occupied housing units, 80.3% were owner-occupied and 19.7% were renter-occupied. The homeowner vacancy rate was 1.4% and the rental vacancy rate was 6.0%.

=== 2000 census ===
As of the census of 2000, there were 19,757 people, 6,990 households, and 5,235 families residing in the county. The population density was 38 people per square mile (15 people/km^{2}). There were 7,714 housing units at an average density of 15 units per square mile (5.8/km^{2}). The racial makeup of the county was 96.72% White, 2.23% Black or African American, 0.20% Native American, 0.12% Asian, 0.01% Pacific Islander, 0.14% from other races, and 0.59% from two or more races. 0.61% of the population were Hispanic or Latino of any race.

There were 6,990 households, out of which 33.50% had children under the age of 18 living with them, 60.70% were married couples living together, 10.30% had a female householder with no husband present, and 25.10% were non-families. 22.10% of all households were made up of individuals, and 9.30% had someone living alone who was 65 years of age or older. The average household size was 2.58 and the average family size was 3.01.

In the county, the population was spread out, with 23.20% under the age of 18, 8.80% from 18 to 24, 31.90% from 25 to 44, 24.50% from 45 to 64, and 11.50% who were 65 years of age or older. The median age was 36 years. For every 100 females, there were 114.30 males. For every 100 females age 18 and over, there were 116.40 males.

The median income for a household in the county was $27,712, and the median income for a family was $31,901. Males had a median income of $25,683 versus $18,606 for females. The per capita income for the county was $12,925. About 13.50% of families and 16.00% of the population were below the poverty line, including 18.50% of those under age 18 and 15.80% of those age 65 or over.

== Communities ==
=== Cities ===
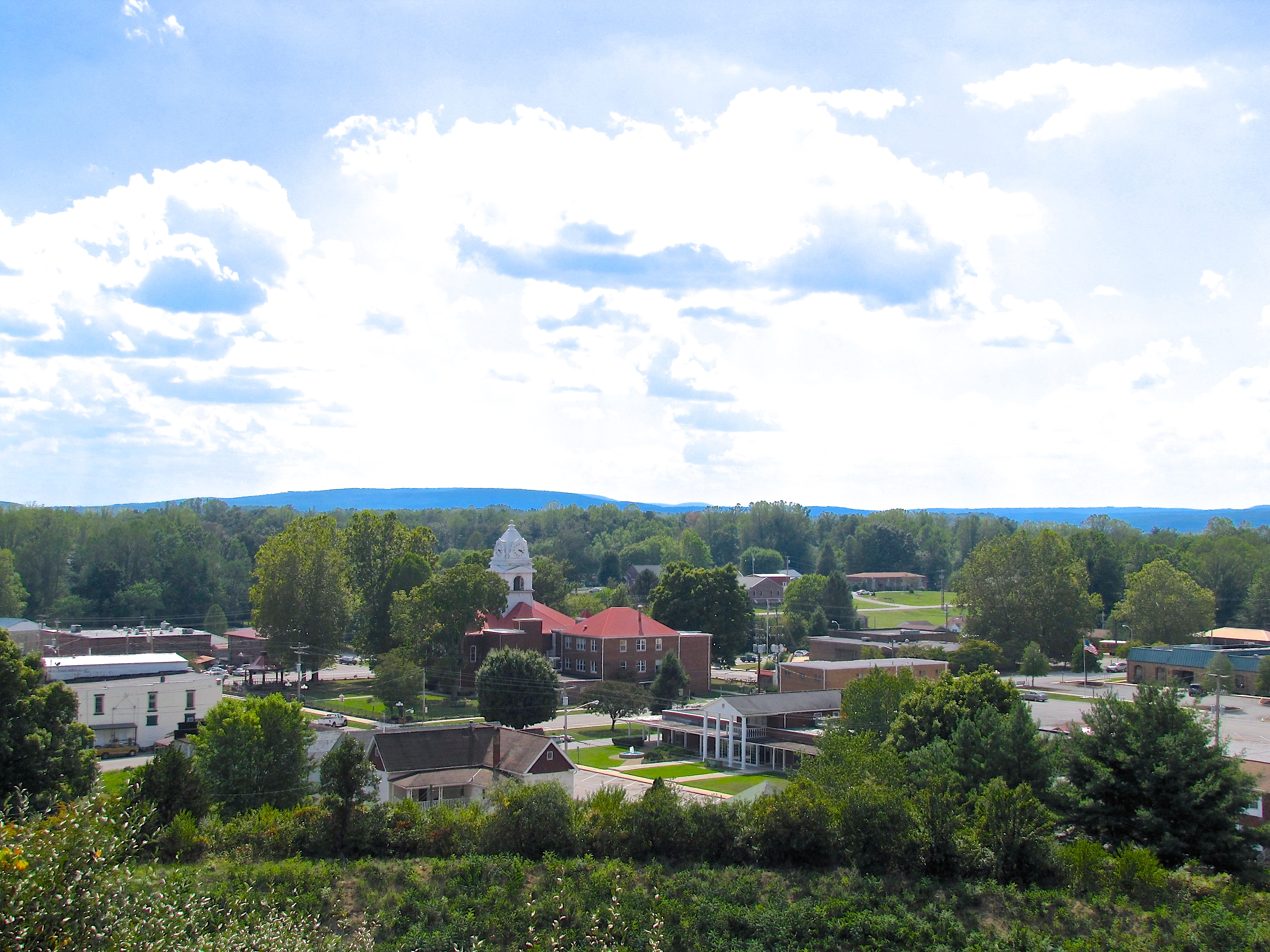
Wartburg

- Harriman (mostly in Roane County)
- Sunbright
- Wartburg (seat)

=== Towns ===
- Oakdale
- Oliver Springs (part)

=== Census-designated places ===
- Coalfield
- Petros

=== Unincorporated communities ===
- Annadel
- Deer Lodge
- Joyner
- Lancing
- Midway
- Rugby (partial)
- Shady Grove

== Politics ==
Morgan County, in line with much of East Tennessee, has historically supported the Republican Party. The county opposed secession during the Civil War and maintained strong Unionist sentiment, which translated into long-term Republican loyalty. Since the late 19th century, Republicans have carried Morgan County in nearly every presidential election, with Democrats only occasionally winning the county in the 20th century. In the 21st century, the county has become increasingly Republican after voting for Bill Clinton in the 1990s. In 2024, Donald Trump received 86.8% of the vote.

United States presidential election results for Morgan County, Tennessee
Year	Republican		Democratic		Third party(ies)	
Year	No.	%	No.	%	No.	%
1912	312	18.86%	466	28.17%	876	52.96%
1916	1,265	67.72%	563	30.14%	40	2.14%
1920	2,248	73.18%	816	26.56%	8	0.26%
1924	1,103	62.78%	411	23.39%	243	13.83%
1928	1,481	76.86%	446	23.14%	0	0.00%
1932	1,184	54.19%	983	44.99%	18	0.82%
1936	1,225	48.51%	1,291	51.13%	9	0.36%
1940	1,448	44.82%	1,783	55.18%	0	0.00%
1944	1,399	53.81%	1,201	46.19%	0	0.00%
1948	1,570	50.89%	1,500	48.62%	15	0.49%
1952	2,565	63.22%	1,492	36.78%	0	0.00%
1956	2,402	62.83%	1,379	36.07%	42	1.10%
1960	2,241	58.13%	1,576	40.88%	38	0.99%
1964	1,842	48.49%	1,957	51.51%	0	0.00%
1968	1,803	47.46%	968	25.48%	1,028	27.06%
1972	2,531	68.35%	1,084	29.27%	88	2.38%
1976	1,949	39.46%	2,953	59.79%	37	0.75%
1980	2,823	56.29%	2,094	41.75%	98	1.95%
1984	2,903	57.19%	2,121	41.78%	52	1.02%
1988	2,576	56.67%	1,941	42.70%	29	0.64%
1992	2,306	37.29%	3,190	51.58%	688	11.13%
1996	2,070	38.88%	2,767	51.97%	487	9.15%
2000	3,144	51.02%	2,921	47.40%	97	1.57%
2004	4,401	59.80%	2,924	39.73%	35	0.48%
2008	4,717	69.14%	1,969	28.86%	136	1.99%
2012	4,669	71.79%	1,725	26.52%	110	1.69%
2016	5,441	81.15%	1,054	15.72%	210	3.13%
2020	6,930	84.22%	1,167	14.18%	131	1.59%
2024	7,427	86.76%	1,054	12.31%	79	0.92%

== See also ==
- National Register of Historic Places listings in Morgan County, Tennessee
