= Tennessee State Route 292 =

State highway in Tennessee

State Route 292
- Baptist Ridge Road
- SR 292 highlighted in red

Route information
- Maintained by TDOT
- Length: 9.6 mi (15.4 km)
- Existed: July 1, 1983–present

Major junctions
- West end: SR 53 at Butlers Landing
- East end: SR 136 in Hilham

Location
- Country: United States
- State: Tennessee
- Counties: Clay, Overton

Highway system
- Tennessee State Routes; Interstate; US; State
← SR 291	→ SR 293

State Route 292 (SR 292), also known as Baptist Ridge Road, is a 9.6-mile-long (15.4 km) east-west state highway in northeastern Middle Tennessee.

== Route description ==
SR 292 begins in Clay County at an intersection with SR 53 at Butlers Landing along the banks of the Cumberland River. It winds its way east through mountains to pass through Baptist Ridge and the southern sliver of Standing Stone State Forest before crossing into Overton County. The highway straightens out as it turns southeast through flatter terrain for several miles before entering Hilham and coming to an end at a Y-intersection with SR 136. The entire route of SR 292 is a rural two-lane highway.

== Major intersections ==
County	Location	mi	km	Destinations	Notes
Clay	Butlers Landing	0.0	0.0	SR 53 (Gainesboro Highway) – Celina, Gainesboro	Western terminus
Overton	Hilham	9.6	15.4	SR 136 (Standing Stone Park Highway) – Cookeville, Standing Stone State Park	Eastern terminus
1.000 mi = 1.609 km; 1.000 km = 0.621 mi
