= Timothy, Tennessee =

- Unincorporated community
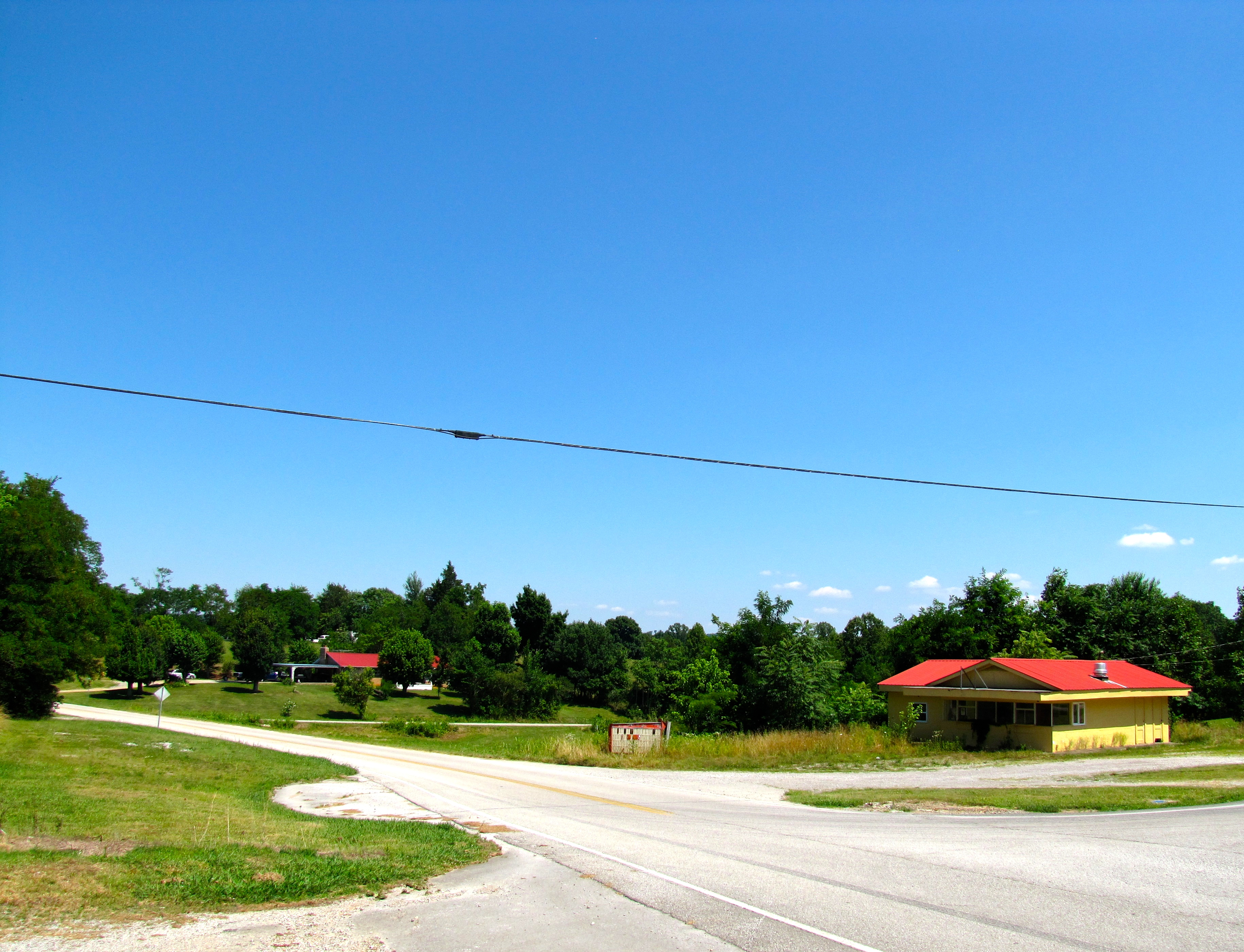
- Buildings along SR 136 in Timothy

- Location within Tennessee Location within the United States
- Coordinates: 36°26′31″N 85°20′41″W
- Country: United States
- State: Tennessee
- County: Overton
- Elevation: 1,060 ft (320 m)
- Time zone: UTC-6 (Central (CST))
  - Summer (DST): UTC-5 (CDT)
- ZIP code: 38568, 38541
- Area code: 931
- GNIS feature ID: 1272657

Timothy is an unincorporated community in Overton County, Tennessee, United States. It is concentrated around the intersection of State Route 52 and State Route 136 between Livingston and Celina, and lies just north of Standing Stone State Park. The community was named for an early postmaster, Timothy Stephens.
