= Tennessee State Route 136 =

State highway in Tennessee, United States

State Route 136
- SR 136 highlighted in red

Route information
- Maintained by TDOT
- Length: 56.51 mi (90.94 km)

Major junctions
- South end: US 70S near Rock Island
- US 70 west of Sparta; SR 111 at Hampton Crossroads; I-40 in Cookeville; US 70N in Cookeville; SR 85 in Hilham
- North end: SR 52 at Timothy

Location
- Country: United States
- State: Tennessee
- Counties: Warren, White, Putnam and Overton

Highway system
- Tennessee State Routes; Interstate; US; State
← SR 135	→ SR 137

State Route 136 (SR 136) is a state highway in the central portion of the U.S. state of Tennessee.

It connects US 70S near Rock Island in Warren County with SR 52 in northern Overton County, traversing much of the northeastern Highland Rim.

== Route description ==
SR 136 begins in Warren County at an intersection with US 70S just south of Rock Island. The route proceeds north to Rock Island and junctions with SR 287, which connects it to Rock Island State Park to the west. SR 136 then bridges the Caney Fork River and enters White County before turning northeast through the community of Walling. It then turns northward again and continues through mostly rural terrain.

After several miles it junctions with US 70 west of Sparta, and SR 135 at Bakers Crossroads, near the Putnam County line. It turns eastward briefly after passing the Upper Cumberland Regional Airport before it has an interchange with SR 111 at Hampton Crossroads, and joins SR 111 for a short distance before diverging again near Cookeville. As it continues into downtown Cookeville, the road widens to four lanes, and crosses an interchange with Interstate 40 (I-40). SR 136 follows Jefferson Avenue through much of Cookeville before briefly turning eastward at the courthouse square, and then northward again along Washington Avenue. Near Cookeville High School at the northern edge of the city, the road narrows for a final time to two lanes.

After it leaves Cookeville, SR 136 continues through rural terrain, passing through the community of Bangham before crossing Spring Creek and entering Overton County and the Hardy's Chapel community. At the community of Hilham, the road intersects SR 85 at a crossroads designed in the late 18th century to align with the four cardinal directions. Beyond Hilham, SR 136 enters Standing Stone State Rustic Park and travels through the park for four miles (6.4 km). In the park, the road descends sharply to Standing Stone Lake, narrows to one lane as it crosses Standing Stone Dam, and widens again to two lanes as it reascends to the ridgeline and passes the park's cabins and headquarters. After leaving the park SR 136 turns eastward and ends at SR 52 at the old Timothy community. SR 52 continues southeastward to Livingston and northwestward to Celina.

== Major intersections ==
County	Location	mi	km	Destinations	Notes
Warren	Rock Island	0.0	0.0	US 70S (Sparta Highway/SR 1) – Sparta, McMinnville	Southern terminus
Warren	Rock Island	1.1	1.8	SR 287 south (Great Falls Road) – Rock Island State Park	Northern terminus of SR 287
White	Cassville	13.1	21.1	US 70 (Smithville Highway/SR 26) – Sparta, Smithville	
White		17.4	28.0	SR 135 (Burgess Falls Road) – Burgess Falls State Park	
White	Hampton Crossroads	21.3	34.3	SR 111 south – Sparta	Southern end of SR 111 concurrency; Interchange
Putnam	Cookeville	24.6	39.6	SR 111 north – Algood	Northern end of SR 111 concurrency; Interchange
Putnam	Cookeville	27.0	43.5	I-40 – Nashville, Knoxville	I-40 exit 287
Putnam	Cookeville	28.8	46.3	US 70N west (East Spring Street/SR 24 west)	Southern end of US 70N concurrency
Putnam	Cookeville	28.8	46.3	US 70N east (East Spring Street/SR 24 east)	Northern end of US 70N concurrency
Putnam–Overton county line		37.5	60.4	SR 293 east (Tommy Dodson Road) – Rickman	Western terminus of SR 293
Overton	Hilham	47.8	76.9	SR 85 (Hilham Highway) – Gainesboro, Livingston	
Overton	Hilham	48.2	77.6	SR 292 west (Baptist Ridge Highway)	Eastern terminus of SR 292
Overton	Timothy	55.0	88.5	SR 52 (Celina Highway) – Celina, Livingston	Northern terminus
1.000 mi = 1.609 km; 1.000 km = 0.621 mi: Concurrency terminus
