= Baptist Ridge, Tennessee =

Unincorporated community in Tennessee, United States

Baptist Ridge
- Unincorporated community
- Location within Tennessee Location within the United States
- Coordinates: 36°29′02″N 85°31′27″W
- Country: United States
- State: Tennessee
- County: Clay
- Elevation: 945 ft (288 m)
- Time zone: UTC-6 (Central (CST))
  - Summer (DST): UTC-5 (CDT)
- Area code: 931
- GNIS feature ID: 1314624

Baptist Ridge is an unincorporated community in Clay County, Tennessee, in the United States.

== History ==
The community was named for the activities of a Baptist minister, according to local history.

== Geography ==
Baptist Ridge is located in southern Clay County along State Route 292 (Baptist Ridge Road) between Standing Stone State Forest and State Route 53 (at Butlers Landing). Baptist Ridge is approximately 5 miles (8.0 km) south of downtown Celina. The community largely consists of a cluster of homes and two churches nested in the mountains, almost entirely centered along State Route 292.
