= Clay County, Tennessee =

County in Tennessee, United States

- County
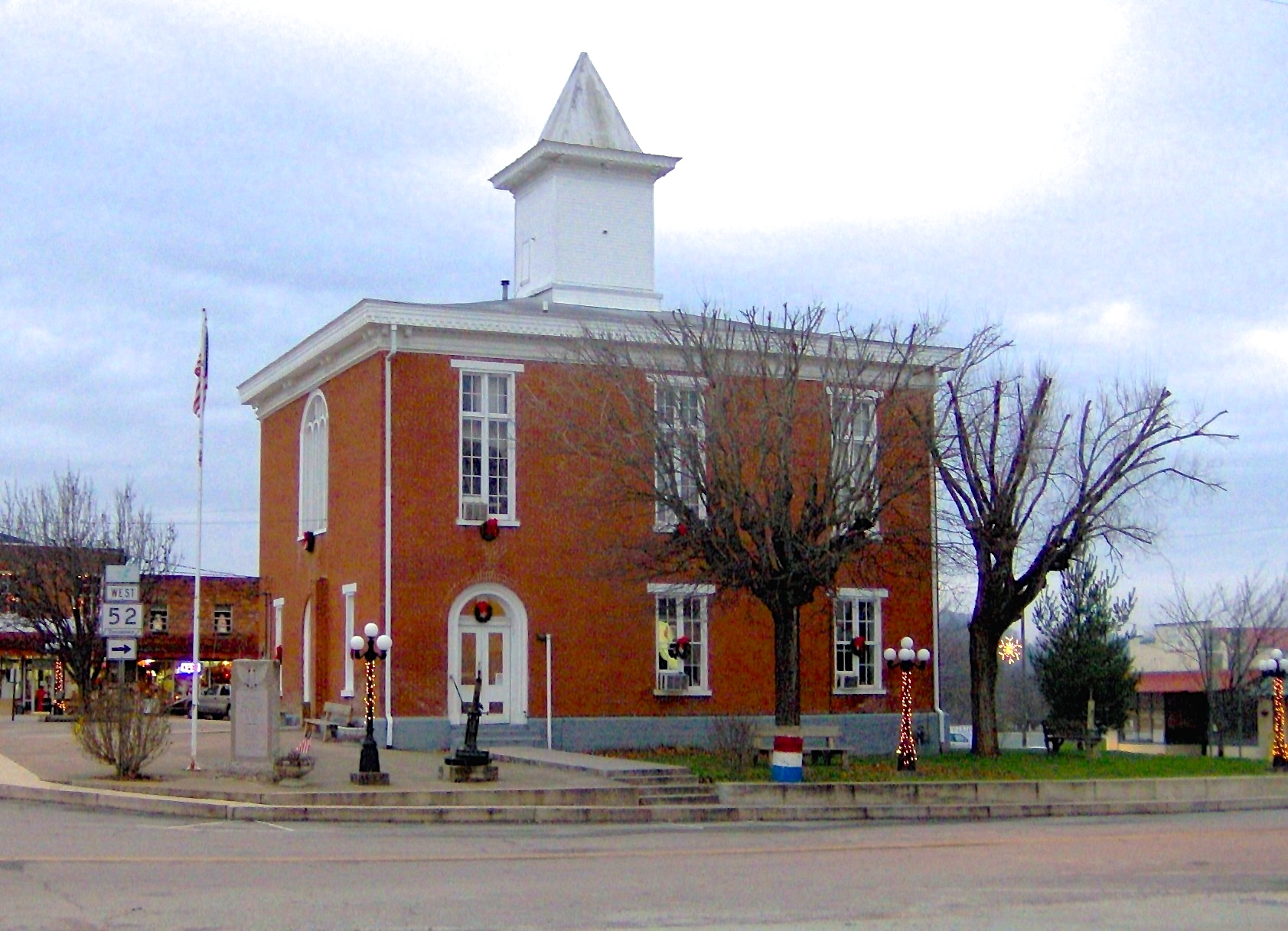
- Clay County Courthouse in Celina

- Location within the U.S. state of Tennessee
- Coordinates: 36°33′N 85°32′W
- Country: United States
- State: Tennessee
- Founded: 1870
- Named for: Henry Clay
- Seat: Celina
- Largest city: Celina

Area
  - Total: 259 sq mi (670 km^{2})
  - Land: 237 sq mi (610 km^{2})
  - Water: 23 sq mi (60 km^{2}) 8.8%

Population (2020)
  - Total: 7,581
  - Estimate (2025): 7,821 ▲
  - Density: 33/sq mi (13/km^{2})
- Time zone: UTC−6 (Central)
  - Summer (DST): UTC−5 (CDT)
- Congressional district: 6th
- Website: dalehollowlake.org

Clay County is a county in the U.S. state of Tennessee. As of the 2020 United States census, the population was 7,581. Its county seat and only incorporated city is Celina. Clay County is named in honor of American statesman Henry Clay, member of the United States Senate from Kentucky and United States Secretary of State in the 19th century.

== History ==
Clay County was formed in 1870 by combining pieces from surrounding Jackson and Overton counties. Secretary of State Cordell Hull's first law office (now a museum) was located in Clay County.

Clay County's early inhabitants farmed and worked the Cumberland River, which was the major method of transportation in the Cumberland area. There were many docks and ferry crossings throughout Clay County to transport local crops and livestock to major markets. The timber industry was a major employer throughout the 1800s and 1900s and provides many jobs today. Tobacco farming became important in the local area throughout the 1900s and many old tobacco barns are still standing. With the end of government subsidies and with foreign competition, tobacco farming is minimal. Cattle, poultry, and corn are the major agricultural influences today. Clay County is one of the top poultry-producing counties in Tennessee.

During the Civil War, many skirmishes took place up and down the Cumberland River to control the movement of barges laden with supplies. Local communities were split in their loyalties, with many families at odds with each other. Some of these animosities remain today between family groups.

The city of Celina is at the junction of the Obey and Cumberland rivers, and it was a major port during the steamboat years between Nashville and Burnside, Kentucky. Although the Celina ferry landing no longer exists, Celina still connects the north and south by highway. Butler's Landing was used as a storage depot with large warehouses owned and operated by the Butler family. The first Clay County Court meeting was held in a store near the river at Butler's Landing on March 6, 1871. Butler's Landing nearly became the county seat, but Celina won the vote by a narrow margin.

Clay County's rural location has restricted development and attraction of business and industry. This has resulted in the county having one of the highest unemployment rates annually in the state of Tennessee. The lack of jobs often results in the loss of educated young people who have limited opportunities locally. SR 52 has been upgraded to a 4-lane divided highway as part of the Corridor J project, which connects to I-40 in Cookeville, and work continues on developing a new industrial park within the Celina city limits. It is hoped this industrial park will help attract more jobs to the county.

== Geography ==
According to the U.S. Census Bureau, the county has a total area of 259 square miles (670 km^{2}), of which 237 square miles (610 km^{2}) is land and 23 square miles (60 km^{2}) (8.8%) is water. The Cumberland River flows through the center of the county from north to south, fed by the Obey River which flows through the city of Celina from its impoundment at Dale Hollow Lake, inundates much of the eastern part of the county.

=== Adjacent counties ===
- Monroe County, Kentucky (north)
- Cumberland County, Kentucky (northeast)
- Clinton County, Kentucky (northeast)
- Pickett County (east)
- Overton County (southeast)
- Jackson County (south)
- Macon County (west)

=== State protected areas ===
- Standing Stone State Forest (part)

=== Highways ===
- SR 51
- SR 52
- SR 53
- SR 135
- SR 292
- SR 294

== Demographics ==
Historical population
Census	Pop.	Note	%±
1880	6,987		—
1890	7,260		3.9%
1900	8,421		16.0%
1910	9,009		7.0%
1920	9,193		2.0%
1930	9,577		4.2%
1940	10,904		13.9%
1950	8,701		−20.2%
1960	7,289		−16.2%
1970	6,624		−9.1%
1980	7,676		15.9%
1990	7,238		−5.7%
2000	7,976		10.2%
2010	7,861		−1.4%
2020	7,581		−3.6%
2025 (est.)	7,821	▲	3.2%
U.S. Decennial Census; 1790-1960 1900-1990; 1990-2000 2010-2020 2020

=== Racial and ethnic composition ===
Clay County, Tennessee – Racial and ethnic composition Note: the US Census treats Hispanic/Latino as an ethnic category. This table excludes Latinos from the racial categories and assigns them to a separate category. Hispanics/Latinos may be of any race.
Race / ethnicity (NH = Non-Hispanic)	Pop 1980	Pop 1990	Pop 2000	Pop 2010	Pop 2020	% 1980	% 1990	% 2000	% 2010	% 2020
White alone (NH)	7,510	7,083	7,664	7,524	7,202	97.84%	97.86%	96.09%	95.71%	95.00%
Black or African American alone (NH)	112	116	105	100	76	1.46%	1.60%	1.32%	1.27%	1.00%
Native American or Alaska Native alone (NH)	8	11	26	16	17	0.10%	0.15%	0.33%	0.20%	0.22%
Asian alone (NH)	11	1	11	7	5	0.14%	0.01%	0.14%	0.09%	0.07%
Native Hawaiian or Pacific Islander alone (NH)	x	x	4	1	1	x	x	0.05%	0.01%	0.01%
Other race alone (NH)	0	0	0	3	4	0.00%	0.00%	0.00%	0.04%	0.05%
Mixed race or Multiracial (NH)	x	x	58	84	146	x	x	0.73%	1.07%	1.93%
Hispanic or Latino (any race)	35	27	108	126	130	0.46%	0.37%	1.35%	1.60%	1.71%
Total	7,676	7,238	7,976	7,861	7,581	100.00%	100.00%	100.00%	100.00%	100.00%

=== 2020 census ===
As of the 2020 census, the county had 7,581 people in 3,264 households, including 2,002 families, and the median age was 49.0 years.

20.4% of residents were under the age of 18 and 24.9% were 65 years of age or older; for every 100 females there were 98.5 males, and for every 100 females age 18 and over there were 97.1 males age 18 and over.

The racial makeup of the county was 95.6% White, 1.0% Black or African American, 0.3% American Indian and Alaska Native, 0.1% Asian, <0.1% Native Hawaiian and Pacific Islander, 0.7% from some other race, and 2.3% from two or more races. Hispanic or Latino residents of any race comprised 1.7% of the population.

<0.1% of residents lived in urban areas, while 100.0% lived in rural areas.

There were 3,941 housing units, of which 17.2% were vacant; among occupied units, 76.2% were owner-occupied and 23.8% were renter-occupied. The homeowner vacancy rate was 1.7% and the rental vacancy rate was 6.8%.

=== 2000 census ===
As of the census of 2000, there were 7,976 people, 3,379 households, and 2,331 families residing in the county. The 2005 Census Estimate placed the population at 7,992. The population density was 34 people per square mile (13 people/km^{2}). There were 3,959 housing units at an average density of 17 per square mile (6.6/km^{2}). The racial makeup of the county was 92.75% White, 1.44% Black or African American, 0.33% Native American, 0.14% Asian, 0.11% Pacific Islander, 0.24% from other races, and 4.99% from two or more races. 1.35% of the population were Hispanic or Latino of any race.

There were 3,379 households, out of which 27.70% had children under the age of 18 living with them, 54.70% were married couples living together, 9.70% had a female householder with no husband present, and 31.00% were non-families. 27.60% of all households were made up of individuals, and 12.00% had someone living alone who was 65 years of age or older. The average household size was 2.33 and the average family size was 2.80.

In the county, the population was spread out, with 21.50% under the age of 18, 7.90% from 18 to 24, 27.40% from 25 to 44, 27.60% from 45 to 64, and 15.70% who were 65 years of age or older. The median age was 40 years. For every 100 females there were 94.60 males. For every 100 females age 18 and over, there were 95.00 males.

The median income for a household in the county was $23,958, and the median income for a family was $29,784. Males had a median income of $23,513 versus $16,219 for females. The per capita income for the county was $13,320. About 14.30% of families and 19.10% of the population were below the poverty line, including 23.40% of those under age 18 and 27.60% of those age 65 or over.

== Communities ==
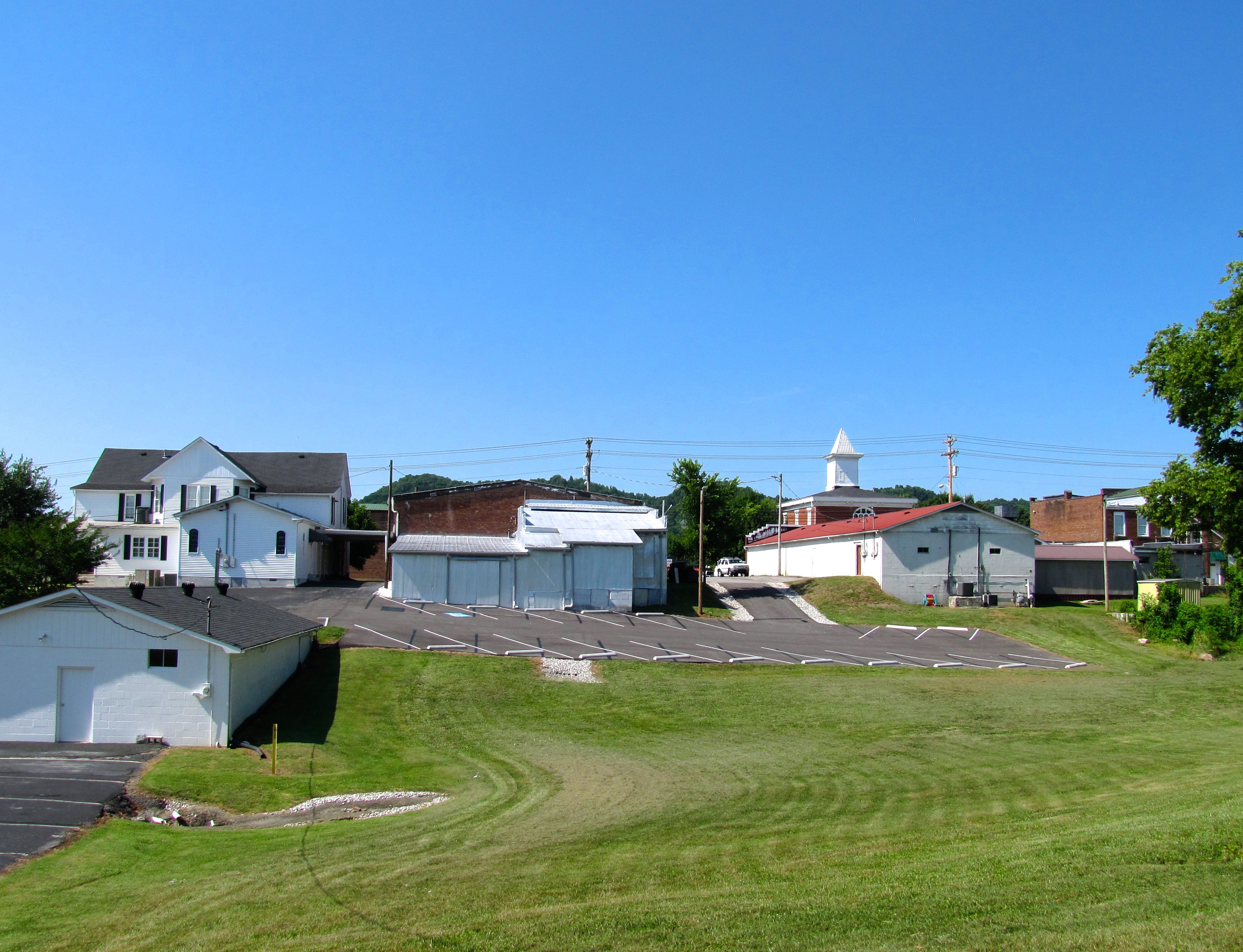
Celina

=== City ===
- Celina (county seat)

=== Unincorporated communities ===
- Bakerton
- Baptist Ridge
- Free Hill
- Hermitage Springs
- Midway
- Moss
- Pea Ridge

=== Ghost town ===
- Willow Grove

== Politics ==
Though a traditionally Democratic county like most of Middle Tennessee, Clay County has historically been more competitive compared to other counties in the region such as Stewart County, with pockets of Southern Unionist sympathy having existed on the Highland Rim west of the Cumberland River even as the river valley and eastern part of the county supported the Confederacy enough to vote for secession by a wider margin than similarly-divided DeKalb County (where secession passed by the narrowest margin of any county that didn't vote to remain). The county voted for GOP candidates in 1920, 1960, 1968, 1972, 1984 and 1988, and Herbert Hoover in 1928, Ronald Reagan in 1980, and George W. Bush in 2004 all came within less than 2 percentage points of winning Clay County. Like almost all of Tennessee, however, the county has turned solidly Republican in the 2010s. The last time Democrats even came close to winning any part of Clay County in any statewide election(s) was 2018, when both Phil Bredesen and Karl Dean came within five percentage points of winning the Celina town limits (losing by 1.6% and 2.9% margins respectively) despite losing badly statewide. Even so, Celina itself has since been swept up in Clay County's hard rightward swing too, with Bill Lee doing better in Celina than statewide when he won re-election in 2022, a stark contrast from his anemic performance in 2018. In 2024, Donald Trump and Marsha Blackburn both got over 80% of the vote in Clay County overall, vastly outperforming even their previous margins; Clay County had one of the four biggest rightward swings/trends of any Tennessee county from the 2020 presidential election to 2024, being the only county in the state other than nearby Trousdale and rural Black Belt Lauderdale and Haywood Counties to trend more than 2.5% rightwards relative to the national popular vote between those two elections. Clay County native Trae Crowder attributed its powerful rightward swing every time Trump was on the ballot to Trump's economic populist messaging in 2016 and the county's lingering economic distress after abruptly losing many manufacturing jobs in the 1990s, with Crowder noting that Clay County voters were told what they wanted to hear in 2016 then became more "dug in" as reliably Republican voters in 2020 and 2024.

United States presidential election results for Clay County, Tennessee
Year	Republican		Democratic		Third party(ies)	
Year	No.	%	No.	%	No.	%
1912	440	35.12%	718	57.30%	95	7.58%
1916	578	44.98%	689	53.62%	18	1.40%
1920	1,044	57.14%	772	42.26%	11	0.60%
1924	488	41.67%	668	57.05%	15	1.28%
1928	556	48.99%	576	50.75%	3	0.26%
1932	361	30.18%	819	68.48%	16	1.34%
1936	378	35.69%	661	62.42%	20	1.89%
1940	537	29.42%	1,288	70.58%	0	0.00%
1944	650	46.30%	754	53.70%	0	0.00%
1948	703	36.98%	1,146	60.28%	52	2.74%
1952	842	46.24%	968	53.16%	11	0.60%
1956	902	48.31%	948	50.78%	17	0.91%
1960	1,098	52.14%	976	46.34%	32	1.52%
1964	622	34.21%	1,196	65.79%	0	0.00%
1968	814	42.13%	667	34.52%	451	23.34%
1972	982	59.01%	648	38.94%	34	2.04%
1976	982	36.67%	1,671	62.40%	25	0.93%
1980	1,344	48.61%	1,376	49.76%	45	1.63%
1984	1,338	50.80%	1,281	48.63%	15	0.57%
1988	1,291	51.78%	1,183	47.45%	19	0.76%
1992	1,072	33.23%	1,922	59.58%	232	7.19%
1996	1,108	36.86%	1,559	51.86%	339	11.28%
2000	1,468	42.65%	1,931	56.10%	43	1.25%
2004	1,650	49.15%	1,675	49.90%	32	0.95%
2008	1,676	55.98%	1,248	41.68%	70	2.34%
2012	1,747	61.95%	1,037	36.77%	36	1.28%
2016	2,141	73.32%	707	24.21%	72	2.47%
2020	2,733	77.95%	735	20.96%	38	1.08%
2024	3,117	82.90%	614	16.33%	29	0.77%

== See also ==
- National Register of Historic Places listings in Clay County, Tennessee
