= USS Overton =

Clemson-class destroyer

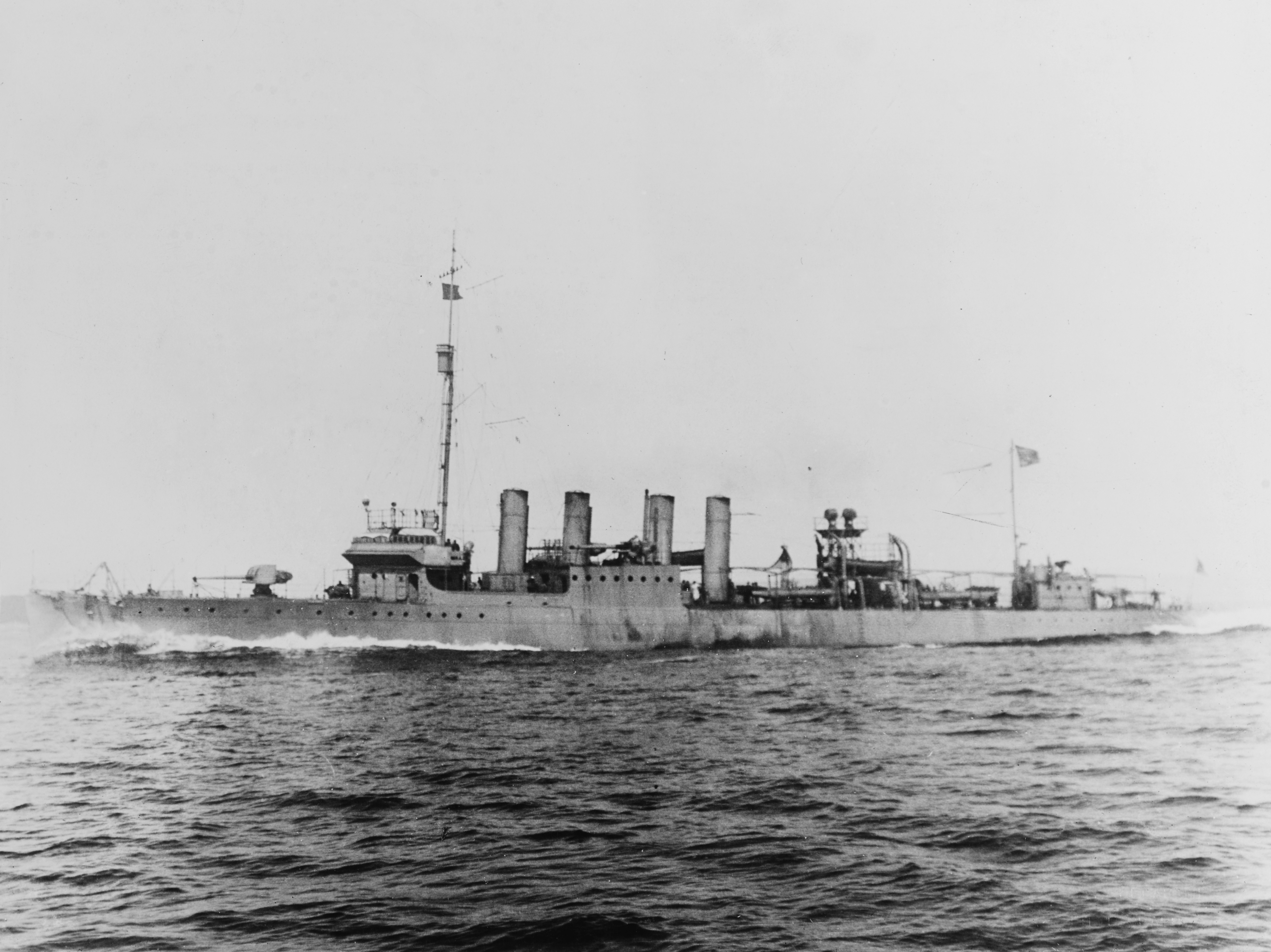

History

United States
- Namesake: Macon C. Overton (1890–1918), U.S. Marine Corps officer
- Builder: New York Shipbuilding
- Laid down: 30 October 1918
- Launched: 10 July 1919
- Commissioned: 30 June 1920
- Decommissioned: 3 February 1931
- Recommissioned: 1932
- Decommissioned: 20 November 1937
- Recommissioned: 26 September 1939
- Decommissioned: 30 July 1945
- Reclassified: High-speed transport (APD-23) 21 August 1943
- Stricken: 13 August 1945
- Honors and awards: Eight battle stars for World War II
- Fate: Sold for scrapping, 30 November 1945

General characteristics
- Class & type: Clemson-class destroyer
- Displacement: 1,308 tons
- Length: 314 feet 5 inches (95.83 m)
- Beam: 31 feet 8 inches (9.65 m)
- Draft: 9 feet 10 inches (3.00 m)
- Propulsion: 26,500 shp (20 MW); geared turbines, 2 screws
- Speed: 35 knots (65 km/h)
- Range: 4,900 nm @ 15 kn (9,100 km at 28 km/h
- Complement: 122 officers and enlisted
- Armament: 4 x 4 in (100 mm) guns, 1 x 3 in (76 mm) gun, 12 x 21 inch (533 mm) torpedo tubes

USS Overton (DD-239/APD–23) was a United States Navy Clemson-class destroyer and high-speed transport that saw service during World War II.

== Namesake ==
Macon C. Overton was born on 18 August 1890 in Union Point, Georgia. Captain Overton served in the United States Marine Corps in World War I and was awarded the Croix de Guerre with silver star and palm for action in the Bois de Belleau (13 June 1918) and the Distinguished Service Cross for action near Mont Blanc (2–10 October 1918). He was mortally wounded on 1 November 1918 while guiding a tank against an enemy position at St. George. He was posthumously awarded an oak leaf cluster to his Distinguished Service Cross.

== Construction and commissioning ==
Overton was laid down 30 October 1918 by the New York Shipbuilding Corporation. She was named prior to Ceremonial ship launching, and was launched on 10 July 1919, sponsored by Mrs. Margaret C. Overton, mother of Captain Overton. She was commissioned on 30 June 1920.

== Service history ==
=== Interwar period ===
Writing to his wife Effie on 5 July 1920, just five days after Overton was commissioned, Commanding Officer Arthur David Murray declared that he was "training a new crew of only three of which have ever been on a destroyer before". Murray reported that he had lost 14 pounds (6.4 kg) in the previous three weeks and stated, "this is the only ship that has gone in with only one officer - the rest have from four to eight - but I expect more officers any day... so you see it took me only a little over three years to get a battle ship [sic] of my own."

Following shakedown, Overton operated with the 3rd Destroyer Squadron and later with the 5th Destroyer Squadron off the East Coast of the United States. While with the 5th Destroyer Squadron in early September 1920, she assisted in the rescue of the crew of the submarine USS S-5 (SS-110). She then was assigned to the 2nd Destroyer Squadron and ordered to European waters. Departing New York City on 14 September 1920, she joined the Black Sea Detachment at Constantinople in the Ottoman Empire on 5 October 1920. For the next year and a half she performed quasi-diplomatic and humanitarian roles necessitated by the aftermath of World War I. Cruising regularly to Caucasian, Romanian, and Ottoman Black Sea ports, she also steamed into the Mediterranean to visit Levantine cities. She distributed relief supplies, provided transportation and communication services, and relocated refugees. Much of the latter was accomplished following the capitulation of General Pyotr Nikolayevich Wrangel's White Army to Bolshevik forces in the Crimea in November 1920 during the Russian Civil War. In July 1922, Overton returned to the United States for abbreviated exercises with the Scouting Fleet and, then, in October 1922, as Ottoman-Greek hostilities flared at Smyrna, rejoined the Turkish Waters Detachment for another six-month tour.

In mid-May 1923, Overton steamed west to Italy, from where she returned to New York City, arriving on 12 June 1923. Independent, squadron, and fleet exercises over the next eight years kept her in the Atlantic, interrupted only by two deployments, in 1925 and 1926, to the Pacific for fleet problems.

On 3 February 1931, Overton was placed out of commission in reserve. In 1932 she was placed in rotating reserve commission, and served in that capacity until again decommissioned, in reserve, on 20 November 1937.

=== World War II ===
==== Destroyer ====
With the outbreak of hostilities in Europe in at the beginning of September 1939, Overton recommissioned on 26 September 1939 and was assigned to the Neutrality Patrol. Moored at Boston, Massachusetts on 7 December 1941, when the Japanese attack on Pearl Harbor brought the United States into World War II, her assignments changed little with American entry into the war. Escort of convoys and antisubmarine warfare (ASW) patrols continued, at first to Iceland and then in the Gulf of Mexico and the Caribbean. Between July 1942 and February 1943, she performed similar missions along the United States East Coast. Then, from 7 February until 26 May 1943, she escorted convoys between New York and Casablanca in French Morocco. Overhaul followed and toward the end of June 1943 Overton joined one of the first escort carrier groups, Task Group 21.11 centered on the escort carrier USS Santee (CVE-29). With that group, she covered the Norfolk, Virginia-to-Casablanca convoy route. On 14 and 30 July 1943, planes from her group were credited with sinking the German submarines U-160 and U-43, respectively.

===== Convoys escorted =====
Convoy	Escort Group	Dates	Notes
HX 155		18-25 Nov 1941	from Newfoundland to Iceland prior to U.S. declaration of war
ON 31		4-15 Nov 1941	from Iceland to Newfoundland prior to US declaration of war
HX 170		16-24 Jan 1942	from Newfoundland to Iceland
ON 61		1-10 Feb 1942	from Iceland to Newfoundland

==== High-speed transport ====
Overton returned to Norfolk, Virginia, on 6 August 1943 and emerged from refit as a high-speed transport, redesignated APD-23 effective 21 August 1943. On 22 October 1943, she departed Norfolk for the Pacific. She arrived at Pearl Harbor, Territory of Hawaii, on 12 November 1943, underwent further training, and, on 22 January 1944, headed west with the Advance Southern Transport Group bound for Kwajalein to take part in the Battle of Kwajalein, part of the Gilbert and Marshall Islands campaign. Before dawn on 31 January 1944, she put reconnaissance troops ashore at Gehh (from where they moved to Ninni) and at Gea to control the Gea Pass into the southern end of Kwajalein Lagoon. She then took up bombardment, fire support, and reconnaissance duties off Kwajalein. On 4 February 1944, she covered the capture of Bigej and, on 8 February 1944, departed for Pearl Harbor and then the West Coast of the United States. By 29 May 1944, however, she was back in the Pacific Theater, en route to Saipan with United States Marines embarked to take part in the Battle of Saipan. Until 24 June 1944, she screened the transport area and patrolled off Tinian, then retired to Eniwetok to escort convoys to Saipan. In July 1944 she resumed patrol and bombardment duties off Tinian during the Battle of Tinian, then covered tank landing craft (LCTs) bound for Guam, and, at the end of July 1944, escorted tank landing ships (LSTs) to Pearl Harbor.

Overton steamed west again on 15 September 1944, this time to Manus, and from there, on 12 October 1944, to the Philippines to cover Underwater Demolition Team (UDT) personnel put ashore prior to the landings on Leyte. Supply convoy assignments preceded her next amphibious operation, the invasion of Lingayen Gulf. On 27 December 1944, she departed Humboldt Bay on the coast of New Guinea. On 6 January 1945, she entered Lingayen Gulf and on 7 January 1945 once again covered UDT personnel ashore. Throughout the landings and until 12 January 1945, Overton screened heavy units and transports, then retired to Leyte.

From Leyte, Overton steamed to Ulithi Atoll, from where she screened the Fast Carrier Task Force′s logistics support group to underway replenishment areas until early March 1945. She next patrolled off Iwo Jima during the Battle of Iwo Jima, and, on 10 March 1945, resumed escort assignments. A run to Leyte was followed by convoy duty to Okinawa. She arrived at Okinawa on 11 April 1945 during the Battle of Okinawa and patrolled on radar picket station until 15 April 1945, then headed for Saipan. From there, she proceeded to the United States.

== Decommissioning and disposal ==
Overton arrived at San Francisco, California, on 15 May 1945 and was ordered on to Philadelphia, Pennsylvania, for inactivation. Decommissioned on 30 July 1945, she was struck from the Navy List, 13 August 1945. She was sold for scrapping on 30 November 1945 to the Boston Metals Company of Baltimore, Maryland.

== Awards ==
Overton earned eight battle stars during World War II.

== See also ==
- USS Overton County (LST-1074)
