= Hardy's Chapel, Tennessee =

- Unincorporated community
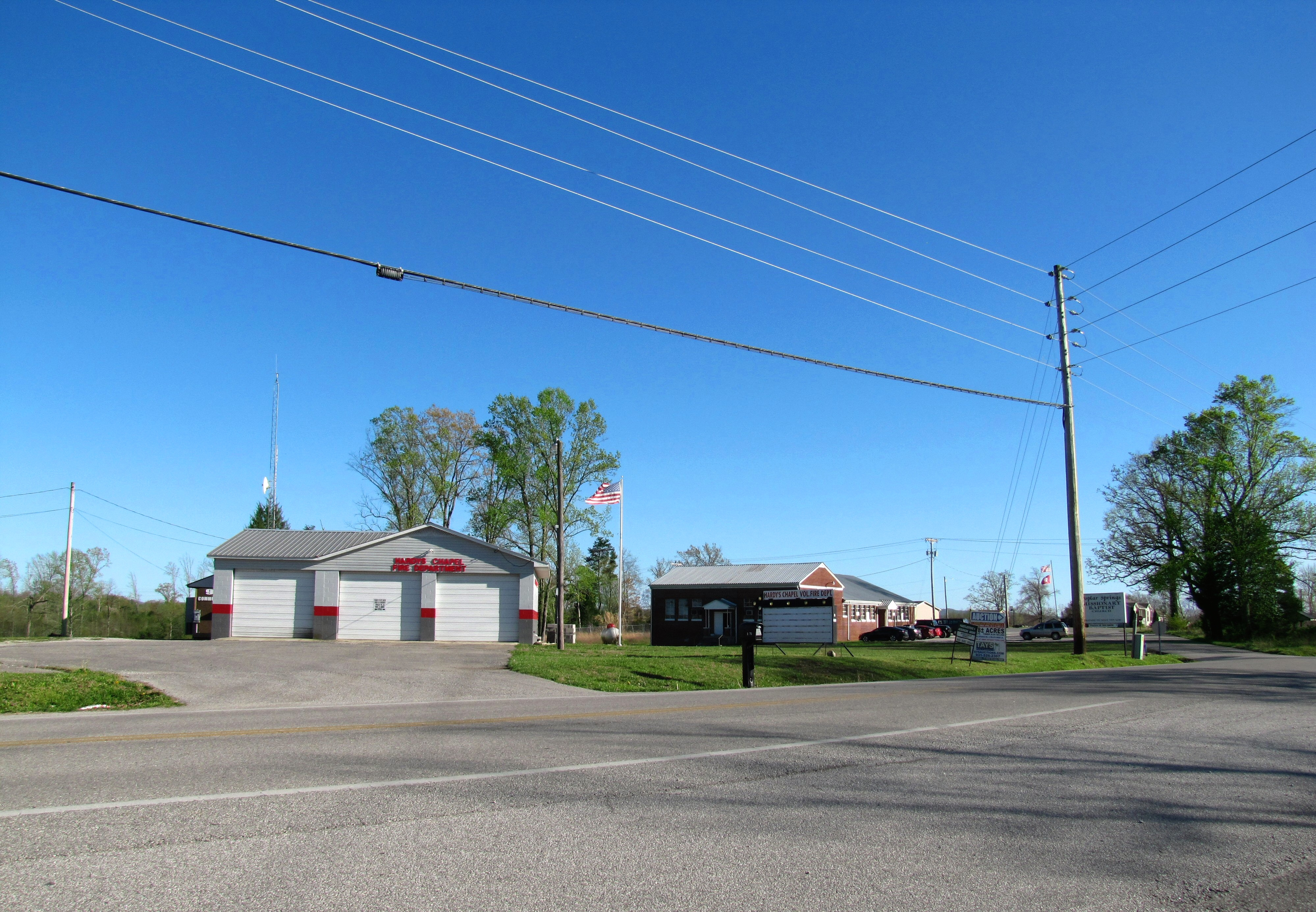
- Buildings in Hardy's Chapel

- Location within Tennessee Location within the United States
- Coordinates: 36°19′06″N 85°26′25″W
- Country: United States
- State: Tennessee
- County: Overton
- Elevation: 1,050 ft (320 m)
- Time zone: UTC-6 (Central (CST))
  - Summer (DST): UTC-5 (CDT)
- ZIP code: 38506
- Area code: 931
- GNIS feature ID: 1286855

Hardy's Chapel (listed simply as Hardy on some maps) is an unincorporated community in Overton County, Tennessee, United States. It is concentrated around the intersection of Tennessee State Route 136 (Standing Stone Highway), Poplar Springs Road, and Hardys Chapel Road in southern Overton County, between Cookeville and Hilham. It is home to a fire department, recycling center, convenience store, and several churches.

The community is named for William Hardy, who deeded land for a school and church for the community.
