= Mineral Springs, Overton County, Tennessee =

Mineral Springs, Tennessee
- Unincorporated community
- Location within Tennessee Location within the United States
- Coordinates: 36°09′42″N 85°13′31″W
- Country: United States
- State: Tennessee
- County: Overton
- Elevation: 1,841 ft (561 m)
- Time zone: UTC-6 (Central (CST))
  - Summer (DST): UTC-5 (CDT)
- Area code: 931
- GNIS feature ID: 1315520

Mineral Springs is an unincorporated community in Overton County, Tennessee, United States.
