= Allred, Tennessee =

- Unincorporated community
- Location within Tennessee Location within the United States
- Coordinates: 36°19′50″N 85°11′23″W
- Country: United States
- State: Tennessee
- County: Overton
- Elevation: 840 ft (260 m)
- Time zone: UTC-6 (Central (CST))
  - Summer (DST): UTC-5 (CDT)
- ZIP code: 38457
- Area code: 931
- GNIS feature ID: 1275626

Allred is an unincorporated community in Overton County, Tennessee, United States. The zip code is: 38457.
