= Thomas D. Harp =

American politician

Thomas David Harp (1824–1900) was a California State senator representing Merced, Tuolumne and Stanislaus counties in the late 19th century.

== Biography ==
Born on August 29, 1824, in Overton County, Tennessee, Harp was the son of Sampson Harp and Deborah Grace, who had ten children. The family moved from Johnson County, Arkansas, to San Joaquin County by 1860, and he became a pioneer farmer of the Modesto area, probably at Ceres. When he died on May 23, 1900, he left a widow, Elizabeth Henderson, and six children. He earlier was married to Margaret Jane Kittrelle. Harp was a member of the Masonic Stanislaus Lodge No. 206 in Modesto.

== Political career ==
Harp was nominated on August 28, 1890, by the Democratic convention of the 30th Senate District to represent Merced, Tuolumne and Stanislaus counties.

The next year he came under suspicion of taking a bribe for his vote in "the division of Colusa County" and the creation of Glenn County. When the time came for him to testify before a San Francisco-based grand jury, "it was found that he was absent." Other witnesses, though, spoke against him, and he was indicted for malfeasance on October 30, 1891, but he quickly left the state for Missouri, and a bench warrant could not be served.

Later it was reported that Harp was indicted by the grand jury "for bribery in connection with the bill for reassessment of the railroad company's property for the several years in which it escaped taxation by the decision declaring the assessment illegal." Senator W. H. Williams of San Francisco was also indicted. The outcome of these indictments is not available. Harp did return from Missouri and was taking part in Senate activities in 1893.
