= USS LST-1074 =

1945 LST-542-class tank landing ship

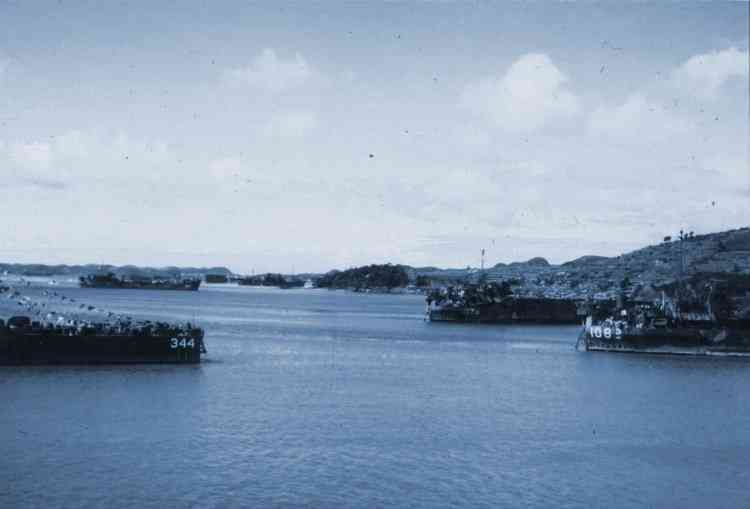
- Left to right: LSM-344, LST-1074, and LST-1082 in Sasebo Harbor, Kyūshū, Japan. A Japanese seaplane base can be seen at the left center of photo.

History

United States
- Name: USS LST-1074
- Builder: Bethlehem Steel Company, Hingham, Massachusetts
- Laid down: 24 February 1945
- Launched: 27 March 1945
- Commissioned: 21 April 1945
- Decommissioned: 4 September 1946
- Renamed: USS Overton County (LST-1074), 1 July 1955
- Stricken: 1 November 1958
- Fate: Sold into commercial service, 29 June 1959

General characteristics
- Class & type: LST-542-class tank landing ship
- Displacement: 1,625 long tons (1,651 t) light; 3,640 long tons (3,698 t) full
- Length: 328 ft (100 m)
- Beam: 50 ft (15 m)
- Draft: Unloaded : 2 ft 4 in (0.71 m) forward; 7 ft 6 in (2.29 m) aft; Loaded : 8 ft 2 in (2.49 m) forward; 14 ft 1 in (4.29 m) aft
- Propulsion: 2 × General Motors 12-567 diesel engines, two shafts, twin rudders
- Speed: 12 knots (22 km/h; 14 mph)
- Boats & landing craft carried: 2 or 6 × LCVPs
- Troops: Approximately 130 officers and enlisted men
- Complement: 8–10 officers, 89–100 enlisted men
- Armament: 8 × 40 mm guns; 12 × 20 mm guns

USS LST-1074 was an LST-542-class tank landing ship built for the United States Navy during World War II. She was later named Overton County (LST-1074) for the Overton County, Tennessee—the only U.S. Naval vessel to bear the name—but never saw active service under that name.

Originally laid down as LST-1074 on 24 February 1945 by the Bethlehem Hingham Shipyards, Inc. of Hingham, Massachusetts; launched on 27 March 1945; and commissioned on 21 April 1945.

== Service history ==
=== World War II, 1945–1946 ===
After a shakedown cruise in the Chesapeake Bay, LST–1074 got underway on 6 June for Pearl Harbor via the Panama Canal. Upon arrival she was ordered to the Big Island of Hawaii, where she engaged in maneuvers with troops of the 5th Marine Division. The 5th Marines had suffered heavy losses during the Battle of Iwo Jima. The maneuvers consisted of simulated landings on the beaches of the Island's west coast.

The war ended on 15 August. The peace treaty with Japan was signed on 2 September on the deck of the USS Missouri. LST 1074 was then ordered to Sasebo, Japan, carrying Marine pilots, whose observation planes were stored in the tank deck. The ship left Hawaii for Japan during the latter part of August, a trip that took 21 days. Afterwards, the ship undertook two trips to the Philippines to bring supplies to Japan, firstly to Manila returning to Osaka and secondly to Subic Bay returning to Sasebo. One day the Marine pilots flew the LST's officers over Nagasaki for a view of the city devastated by the second atom bomb.

LST 1074 then set out for San Francisco, where it was berthed at the Hunter's Point Naval Shipyard and prepared for "moth balling." The final destination of LST 1074 was the Columbia River near Portland, Oregon.

=== Decommissioning and sale ===
After operations on the West Coast she was placed out of commission in reserve on 4 September 1946. Named USS Overton County (LST-1074) on 1 July 1955, she was struck from the Naval Vessel Register on 1 November 1958.

Overton County was sold on 29 June 1959 to Foss Maritime for conversion to a concrete barge, and completed in 1960. The ship was resold (date unknown) to Salmon Bay Barge Line, Inc., of Seattle, Washington, and renamed Santos. The ship was being operated as a cargo barge by Salmon Bay Barge Line as of 2008.
