= Overton County, Tennessee =

County in Tennessee, United States

- County
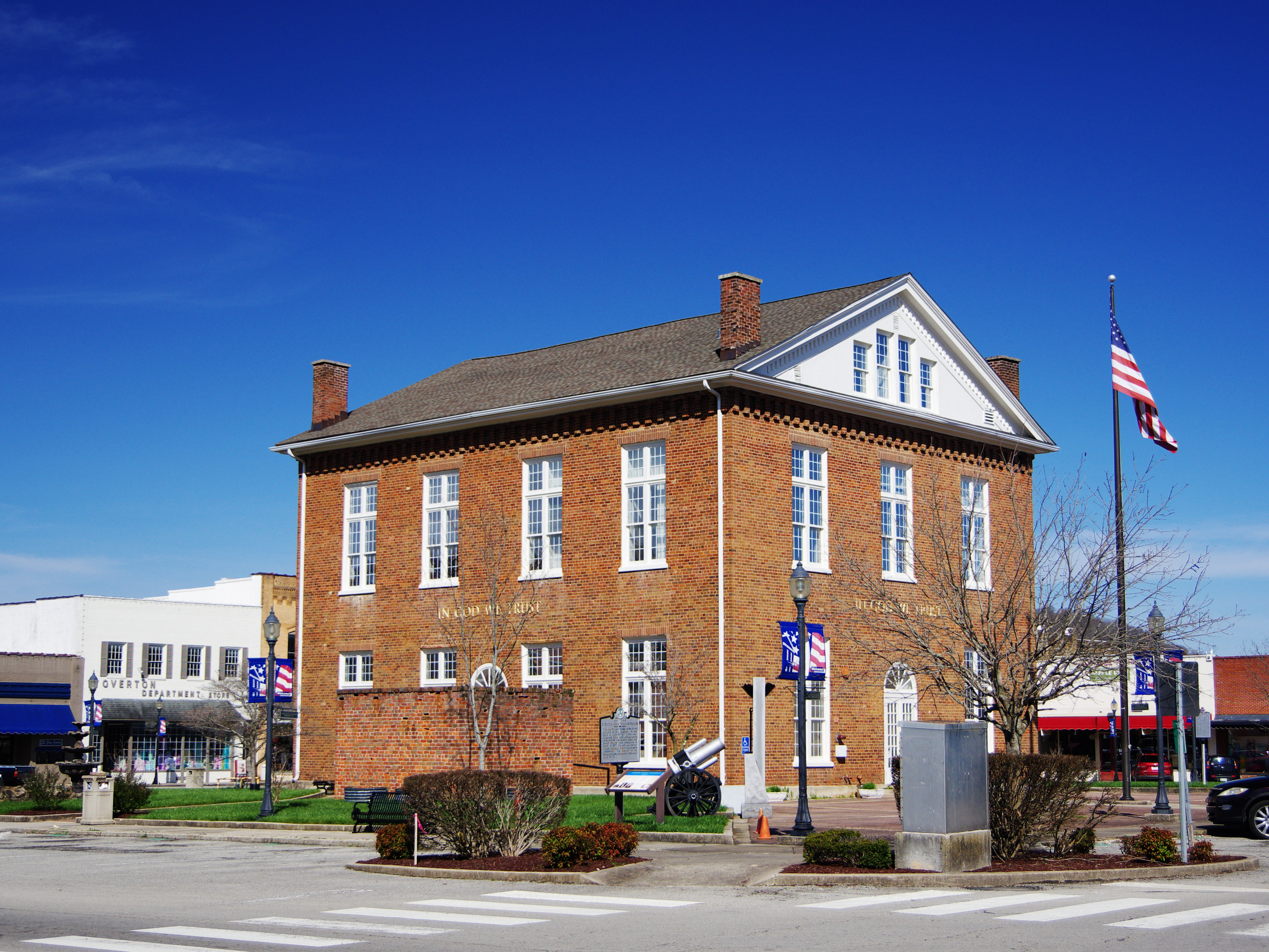
- Overton County Courthouse in Livingston

- Location within the U.S. state of Tennessee
- Coordinates: 36°20′N 85°17′W
- Country: United States
- State: Tennessee
- Founded: September 1806
- Named for: John Overton
- Seat: Livingston
- Largest town: Livingston

Area
  - Total: 435 sq mi (1,130 km^{2})
  - Land: 433 sq mi (1,120 km^{2})
  - Water: 1.4 sq mi (3.6 km^{2}) 0.3%

Population (2020)
  - Total: 22,511
  - Estimate (2025): 23,787 ▲
  - Density: 51/sq mi (20/km^{2})
- Time zone: UTC−6 (Central)
  - Summer (DST): UTC−5 (CDT)
- Congressional district: 6th
- Website: overtoncountytn.gov

Overton County is a county located in the U.S. state of Tennessee. As of the 2020 census, the population was 22,511. Its county seat is Livingston. Overton County is part of the Cookeville, TN Micropolitan Statistical Area.

== History ==
On May 10, 1933, a half-mile wide F4 tornado struck the small community of Beatty Swamps (also referred to as Bethsadia). The tornado destroyed every structure in the town and either killed or injured nearly every inhabitant, with 33 of the 35 deaths occurring in the area. Much of the area was swept clean of debris, a reaper-binder was thrown 500 yards (460 m), and cars were moved hundreds of feet.

== Geography ==
According to the U.S. Census Bureau, the county has a total area of 435 square miles (1,130 km^{2}), of which 433 square miles (1,120 km^{2}) is land and 1.4 square miles (3.6 km^{2}) (0.3%) is water.

Overton County straddles the Eastern Highland Rim, and generally consists of low, rolling hills divided by narrow creek valleys. The backwaters of Dale Hollow Lake, namely the Mitchell Creek and Big Eagle Creek sections, spill over into the northern part of the county. The county is located on the Cumberland Plateau.

Unlike most of Tennessee, a small part of northern Overton County is outside of the Sun Belt due to a past error surveying the northern border of Middle and East Tennessee. Overton County, neighboring Jackson County to the west and neighboring Fentress County to the east are the only three Tennessee counties to have areas north of the Sun Belt without bordering Kentucky nor Virginia. The Sun Belt is defined by the Kinder Institute as being south of 36°30'N latitude, which was intended to be the northern border of Tennessee and is the actual northern border of West Tennessee.

=== Adjacent counties ===
- Pickett County (northeast)
- Fentress County (east)
- Putnam County (south)
- Jackson County (west)
- Clay County (northwest)

=== State protected areas ===
- Alpine Mountain Wildlife Management Area
- Jackson Swamp Wildlife Management Area
- Standing Stone State Forest (part)
- Standing Stone State Park

== Demographics ==
Historical population
Census	Pop.	Note	%±
1810	5,643		—
1820	7,128		26.3%
1830	8,242		15.6%
1840	9,279		12.6%
1850	11,211		20.8%
1860	12,637		12.7%
1870	11,297		−10.6%
1880	12,153		7.6%
1890	12,039		−0.9%
1900	13,353		10.9%
1910	15,854		18.7%
1920	17,617		11.1%
1930	18,079		2.6%
1940	18,883		4.4%
1950	17,566		−7.0%
1960	14,661		−16.5%
1970	14,866		1.4%
1980	17,575		18.2%
1990	17,636		0.3%
2000	20,118		14.1%
2010	22,083		9.8%
2020	22,511		1.9%
2025 (est.)	23,787	▲	5.7%
U.S. Decennial Census; 1790-1960 1900-1990; 1990-2000 2010-2014

=== Racial and ethnic composition ===
Overton County, Tennessee – Racial and ethnic composition Note: the US Census treats Hispanic/Latino as an ethnic category. This table excludes Latinos from the racial categories and assigns them to a separate category. Hispanics/Latinos may be of any race.
Race / ethnicity (NH = Non-Hispanic)	Pop 1980	Pop 1990	Pop 2000	Pop 2010	Pop 2020	% 1980	% 1990	% 2000	% 2010	% 2020
White alone (NH)	17,365	17,519	19,752	21,452	21,223	98.81%	99.34%	98.18%	97.14%	94.28%
Black or African American alone (NH)	44	30	54	86	86	0.25%	0.17%	0.27%	0.39%	0.38%
Native American or Alaska Native alone (NH)	28	10	51	65	60	0.16%	0.06%	0.25%	0.29%	0.27%
Asian alone (NH)	7	4	17	43	61	0.04%	0.02%	0.08%	0.19%	0.27%
Native Hawaiian or Pacific Islander alone (NH)	x	x	8	1	0	x	x	0.04%	0.00%	0.00%
Other race alone (NH)	2	0	1	9	31	0.01%	0.00%	0.00%	0.04%	0.14%
Mixed race or Multiracial (NH)	x	x	97	225	706	x	x	0.48%	1.02%	3.14%
Hispanic or Latino (any race)	129	73	138	202	344	0.73%	0.41%	0.69%	0.91%	1.53%
Total	17,575	17,636	20,118	22,083	22,511	100.00%	100.00%	100.00%	100.00%	100.00%

=== 2020 census ===
As of the 2020 census, the county had a population of 22,511, with 9,147 households and 6,220 families residing in the county. The median age was 44.4 years, with 21.7% of residents under the age of 18 and 21.5% aged 65 years or older. For every 100 females there were 99.9 males, and for every 100 females age 18 and over there were 96.6 males age 18 and over.

The racial makeup of the county was 94.8% White, 0.4% Black or African American, 0.3% American Indian and Alaska Native, 0.3% Asian, <0.1% Native Hawaiian and Pacific Islander, 0.5% from some other race, and 3.8% from two or more races; Hispanic or Latino residents of any race comprised 1.5% of the population.

<0.1% of residents lived in urban areas, while 100.0% lived in rural areas.

Of the 9,147 households, 28.4% had children under the age of 18 living in them, 52.2% were married-couple households, 17.8% were households with a male householder and no spouse or partner present, and 24.2% were households with a female householder and no spouse or partner present. About 27.1% of all households were made up of individuals and 14.4% had someone living alone who was 65 years of age or older. There were 10,329 housing units, of which 11.4% were vacant; among occupied housing units, 77.8% were owner-occupied and 22.2% were renter-occupied. The homeowner vacancy rate was 1.3% and the rental vacancy rate was 5.6%.

=== 2000 census ===
As of the census of 2000, there were 20,118 people, 8,110 households, and 5,920 families residing in the county. The population density was 46 people per square mile (18 people/km^{2}). There were 9,168 housing units at an average density of 21 units per square mile (8.1/km^{2}). The racial makeup of the county was 94.59% White, 0.28% Black or African American, 2.28% Native American, 0.09% Asian, 0.05% Pacific Islander, 0.22% from other races, and 0.49% from two or more races. 2.69% of the population were Hispanic or Latino of any race.

There were 8,110 households, out of which 29.20% had children under the age of 18 living with them, 59.20% were married couples living together, 9.90% had a female householder with no husband present, and 27.00% were non-families. 24.10% of all households were made up of individuals, and 11.00% had someone living alone who was 65 years of age or older. The average household size was 2.46 and the average family size was 2.90.

In the county, the population was spread out, with 23.00% under the age of 18, 8.40% from 18 to 24, 27.70% from 25 to 44, 25.90% from 45 to 64, and 15.00% who were 65 years of age or older. The median age was 39 years. For every 100 females, there were 96.20 males. For every 100 females age 18 and over, there were 93.10 males.

The median income for a household in the county was $26,915, and the median income for a family was $32,156. Males had a median income of $25,287 versus $19,674 for females. The per capita income for the county was $13,910. About 12.30% of families and 16.00% of the population were below the poverty line, including 20.40% of those under age 18 and 20.50% of those age 65 or over.

== Communities ==
=== Town ===
- Livingston (county seat)

=== Census-designated place ===
- Hilham

=== Unincorporated communities ===
- Allons
- Allred
- Alpine
- Crawford
- Hardy's Chapel
- Mineral Springs
- Monroe
- Rickman
- Timothy

== Notable people ==
- Lester Flatt, bluegrass musician
- Thomas D. Harp, California State Senator born in Overton County
- Albert H. Roberts, 33rd Governor of Tennessee
- Roy Roberts, blues singer
- Catherine "Bonny Kate" Sevier, widow of first Governor of Tennessee John Sevier
- Cordell Hull, 47th United States Secretary of State
- Josiah Gregg, merchant, explorer, naturalist, and author of Commerce of the Prairies
- Benoni Strivson, Medal of Honor recipient who fought in the Indian Campaigns in 1868

== Politics ==
Overton County was once a Democratic stronghold. Starting in 2008, the county has consistently voted Republican by increasing margins. In 2024, Republican Donald Trump won over 80% of the county's vote, the best-ever performance by a Republican.

United States presidential election results for Overton County, Tennessee
Year	Republican		Democratic		Third party(ies)	
Year	No.	%	No.	%	No.	%
1912	743	29.47%	1,531	60.73%	247	9.80%
1916	1,030	39.78%	1,512	58.40%	47	1.82%
1920	1,939	51.91%	1,779	47.63%	17	0.46%
1924	900	36.33%	1,532	61.85%	45	1.82%
1928	1,195	51.80%	1,105	47.90%	7	0.30%
1932	661	22.75%	2,231	76.80%	13	0.45%
1936	942	36.85%	1,608	62.91%	6	0.23%
1940	988	36.15%	1,718	62.86%	27	0.99%
1944	935	39.14%	1,449	60.65%	5	0.21%
1948	917	31.57%	1,835	63.17%	153	5.27%
1952	1,453	39.47%	2,209	60.01%	19	0.52%
1956	1,508	38.44%	2,385	60.80%	30	0.76%
1960	1,831	43.06%	2,389	56.19%	32	0.75%
1964	1,155	26.17%	3,258	73.83%	0	0.00%
1968	1,258	31.25%	1,592	39.54%	1,176	29.21%
1972	1,947	54.17%	1,573	43.77%	74	2.06%
1976	1,115	22.09%	3,897	77.21%	35	0.69%
1980	1,869	35.49%	3,343	63.47%	55	1.04%
1984	2,054	42.53%	2,749	56.92%	27	0.56%
1988	1,873	42.60%	2,511	57.11%	13	0.30%
1992	1,657	24.91%	4,489	67.49%	505	7.59%
1996	1,756	29.11%	3,800	63.00%	476	7.89%
2000	2,875	38.35%	4,507	60.13%	114	1.52%
2004	3,941	46.31%	4,518	53.09%	51	0.60%
2008	4,497	55.57%	3,419	42.25%	176	2.17%
2012	4,775	62.30%	2,805	36.60%	84	1.10%
2016	6,059	73.63%	1,945	23.64%	225	2.73%
2020	7,918	78.89%	2,033	20.26%	86	0.86%
2024	9,042	81.69%	1,931	17.45%	96	0.87%

== See also ==
- Alpine Institute
- National Register of Historic Places listings in Overton County, Tennessee
- Standing Stone State Park
- USS Overton County (LST-1074)
