= Roy Roberts (blues artist) =

American blues musician (born 1942)

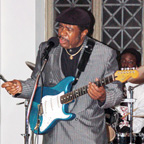
- Roy Roberts performs at Scripture Cake movie premiere

Background information
- Born: February 22, 1942 (age 84); Livingston, Tennessee, United States
- Genres: Blues, country
- Occupations: Guitarist, singer, songwriter, record producer
- Instrument: Guitar
- Years active: Early 1960s–present
- Label: Evidence

Roy Roberts (born February 22, 1942) is an American blues musician, record producer, and singer-songwriter. Roberts was born and grew up in a small town in Livingston, Tennessee, United States, listening to blues and R&B on radio stations. At the age of 14 he worked on a nearby farm to earn the money for his first guitar, a mail order Sears Silvertone.

== History ==
Roberts left farm-life at age 18 to live with an uncle in Greensboro, North Carolina. He was inspired to become a professional musician after he went to a nightclub where Jerry Butler was performing. Roberts worked hard honing his guitar skills while playing in bands until he landed a job with local Greensboro hero, Guitar Kimbers’ Untouchables. Before long, he began backing up major artists who came through town.

One major artist, Solomon Burke, took Roberts under his wing after letting him sit in as a bass player during a local gig. Roberts soon became the guitarist behind Burke on tour. Roberts subsequently picked up touring gigs with Eddie Floyd, "Little" Stevie Wonder, Dee Clark and Otis Redding, while fronting his own band, The Roy Roberts Experience, on the regional club scene and Southeastern beach town circuit.

Roberts began to cut records in the mid-1960s, staying mostly behind the scenes as a session musician with Eddie Floyd, Dee Clark, Stevie Wonder, William Bell, Solomon Burke, and Otis Redding. The death of Otis Redding inspired Roberts to step up to the microphone with a song dedicated to the late crooner. The record was released on Nina Simone’s NinaAndy label. Roberts followed this successful effort with a string of singles that carried him well into the 1970s. During the disco years, Roberts turned his talents to country music, touring with O.B. McClinton and releasing a number of country records. After a brief hiatus from the music scene, Roberts built a recording studio in Virginia in 1989, where he produced records by regional gospel artists and cut a gospel record of his own.

In the early 1990s, Roberts returned to Greensboro, and built Rock House Records recording studio. Besides recording his own material on Rock House, Roberts has produced albums for Priscilla Price, Lou Pride, Chick Willis, Skeeter Brandon, Floyd Miles and Eddie Floyd. He has won numerous awards for his record production and his own music.

== Discography ==
- Introducing Roy Roberts - 1994
- A Woman Needs Love - 1995
- Roy Roberts Live - 1995
- Every Shade of Blue - 1997
- Deeper Shade of Blue - 1999
- Burnin’ Love - 2001
- Daylight with a Flashlight - 2003
- Partners and Friends - 2004
- By Request -The Best of Roy Roberts - 2005
- Sicily Moon - 2006
- Roy Roberts & Friends (Blues & Soul Review) - 2006
- Man with a Message (Gospel) - 2007
- It's Only You - 2008
- Strange Love - 2011

== Films ==
Scripture Cake, a movie written, directed, and produced by Dr. Emily D. Edwards, contained six songs by Roberts. Four were original material, two were instrumentals only. He also sings a medley of gospel songs.

== Awards ==
- 2001

Keeping the Blues Alive - Piedmont Blues Preservation Society

- 2002

Cover of The Living Blues Magazine
The Living Blues Producer of the Year
Artist Most Deserving of Wider Recognition
Best Blues Album - Chick Willis' From the Heart & Soul was produced by Roy Roberts at his Rock House Records Studio

- 2003

Franco Rubegni Award (For the spreading of soul music)

- 2004

CBMA Blues Song of the Year for "I Slipped"

- 2006

CBMA Pioneer Award and induction into the Hall of Fame
Interstate highway sign dedicated to Roberts by his hometown of Livingston, Tennessee
