= Moses Fisk =

Moses Fisk (June 11, 1760 – July 26, 1840) was a pioneer settler of Tennessee. Fisk established the unincorporated community of Hilham, Tennessee on the Tennessee portion of the Cumberland Plateau, and the Fisk Female Academy—one of the first such educational institutions in the South. There is no known connection between Fisk Female Academy and Fisk University in Nashville, Tennessee, nor between Fisk University patron Clinton B. Fisk and Moses Fisk.

In addition to being a Dartmouth graduate, graduating in 1786, and educator from 1788 – 1995, Moses Fisk was a mathematician, surveyor, author, road builder, lawyer, postmaster, minister, musician, land speculator, merchant, and farmer.

Fisk was a staunch abolitionist and an advocate for Native Americans. He was also an important figure in documenting and preserving the Native American archeology and anthropology of the area. Fisk was a charter member of the American Antiquarian Society, and is considered to be "the Upper Cumberland’s first antiquarian."
