= Obey River =

Coordinates: 36°33′18″N 85°30′44″W

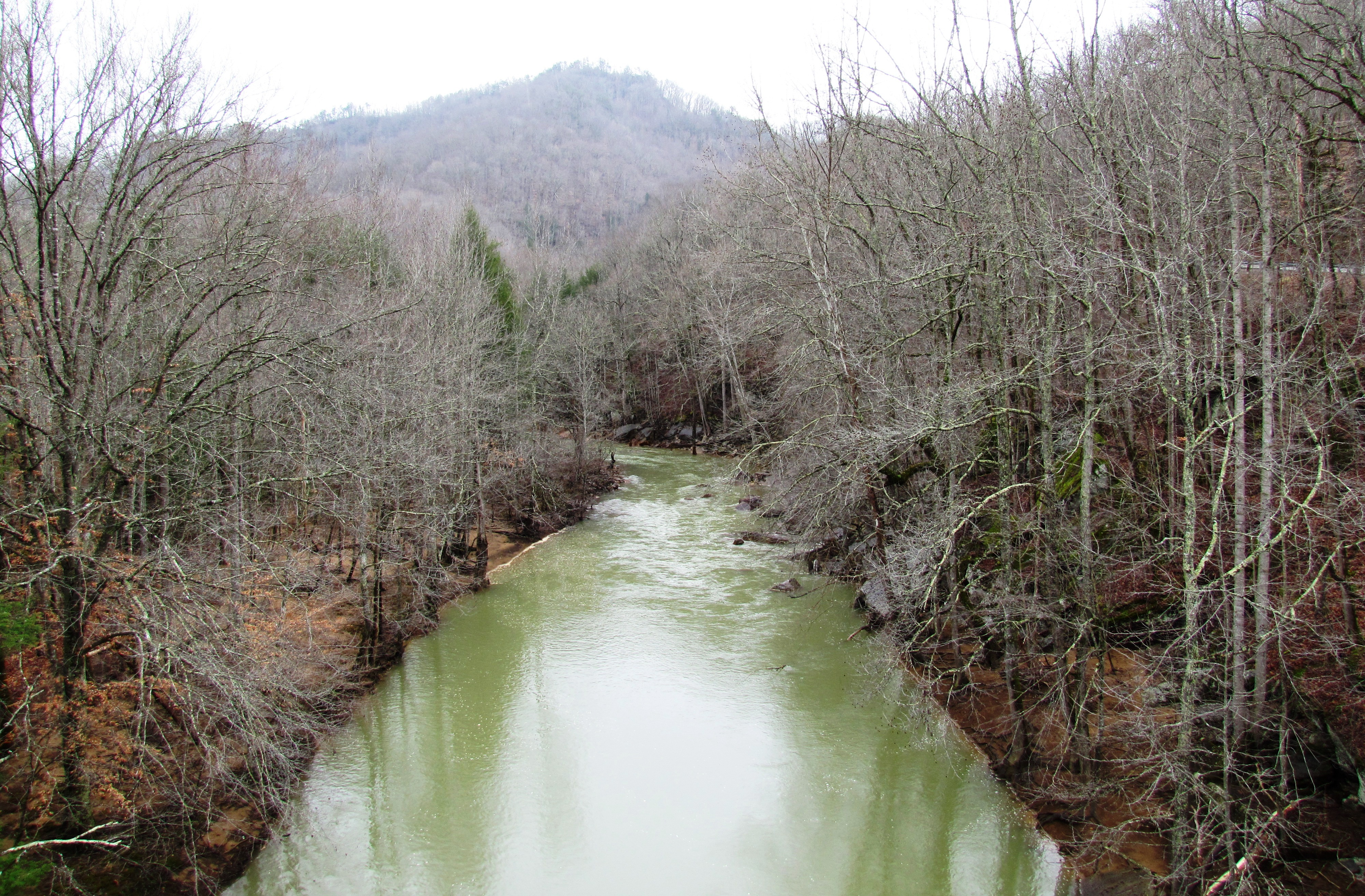
- The East Fork Obey River, photographed from the bridge along Highway 85 in western Fentress County, Tennessee

Location
- Country: United States
- State: Tennessee

Physical characteristics
- Source
  - elevation: 495 ft (151 m)
- Mouth
  - location: Cumberland River
- Length: 47.8 mi (76.9 km)
- Discharge
  - location: Dale Hollow Dam
  - average: 1,427 cu ft/s (40.4 m^{3}/s)

The Obey River is a 47.8-mile-long (76.9 km) tributary of the Cumberland River in the U.S. state of Tennessee. It joins the Cumberland River near the town of Celina, which is generally considered to be the Cumberland's head of navigation. Via the Cumberland and Ohio rivers, the Obey River is part of the Mississippi River watershed.

Near its mouth, the Obey is impounded by the U.S. Army Corps of Engineers Dale Hollow Reservoir, site of a fish hatchery run by the federal government. This dam impounds the Obey for essentially its entire length, causing slack water well up both major tributaries, the East and West Forks. This lake is relatively deep due to the height of the dam and the depth of the gorges through which the Obey and its tributaries flowed; the impoundment also enters Kentucky in its Wolf River and Sulphur Creek and Illwill Creek embayments.

Below the dam the stream makes two sharp bends before entering the Cumberland. The only major bridge on the free-flowing Obey, on State Route 53, is located just below the second of these, Peterman Bend.

== See also ==
- List of rivers of Tennessee
