= Celina, Tennessee =

- City
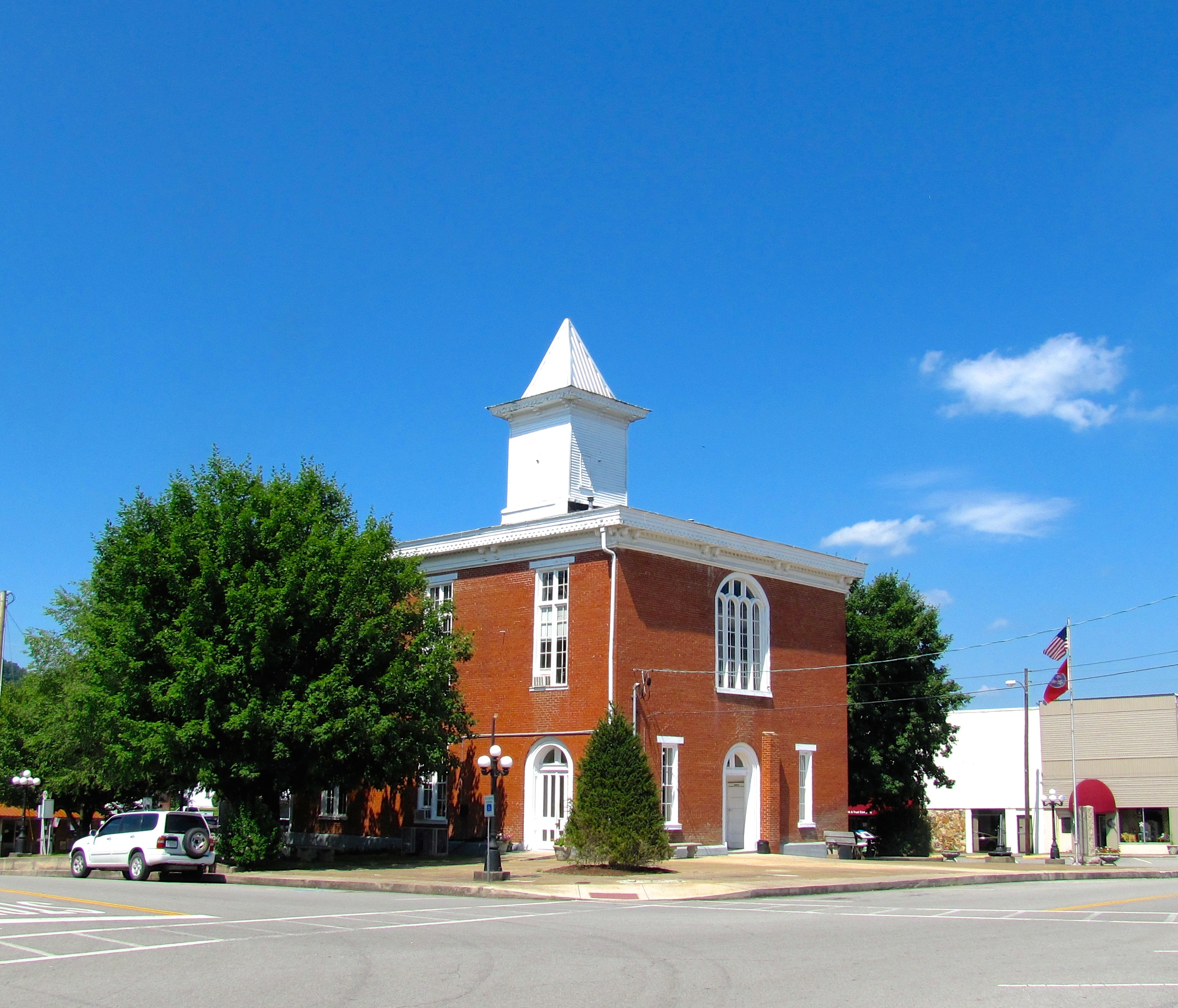
- Clay County Courthouse in Celina

- Location of Celina in Clay County, Tennessee.
- Coordinates: 36°32′54″N 85°30′7″W
- Country: United States
- State: Tennessee
- County: Clay
- Founded: 1832
- Incorporated: 1846
- Named for: Celina Fisk Christian (early settler)

Government
  - Mayor: Luke Collins

Area
  - Total: 1.84 sq mi (4.77 km^{2})
  - Land: 1.84 sq mi (4.77 km^{2})
  - Water: 0 sq mi (0.00 km^{2})
- Elevation: 554 ft (169 m)

Population (2020)
  - Total: 1,422
  - Density: 771.4/sq mi (297.85/km^{2})
- Time zone: UTC-6 (Central (CST))
  - Summer (DST): UTC-5 (CDT)
- ZIP code: 38551
- Area code: 931
- FIPS code: 47-12100
- GNIS feature ID: 1280109
- Website: www.cityofcelinatn.com

Celina is a city in and the county seat of Clay County, Tennessee, United States. The population was 1,422 at the 2020 census.

== History ==
Celina was founded in the 19th century and named after the daughter of local pioneer entrepreneur and educator, Moses Fisk. In the late 19th century, Celina prospered as a logging town, receiving logs that had been cut in the forests to the east and floated down the Obey River. In 1878, African Americans were violently driven out of Celina and its neighboring town, Free Hill.

== Geography ==
Celina is located near the center of Clay County at 36°32′54″N 85°30′7″W (36.548379, -85.501980). The city is situated in a relatively broad valley surrounded by rugged hills characteristic of the eastern Highland Rim. This valley is created by the confluence of the Cumberland River, which approaches from the north, and the Obey River, which approaches from the east. This section of both rivers is part of Cordell Hull Lake, a reservoir created by Cordell Hull Dam near Carthage several miles to the southwest. Dale Hollow Dam, which creates the vast Dale Hollow Lake, lies along the Obey River just east of Celina.

Tennessee State Route 52 passes through the city, connecting it with Red Boiling Springs and Lafayette to the west and Livingston to the southeast. Tennessee State Route 53, which intersects SR 52 in the southern part of Celina, runs southwestward down the Cumberland River to Gainesboro, and northeastward to the Kentucky border, where it continues as Kentucky Route 61 in the direction of Burkesville.

According to the United States Census Bureau, the city has a total area of 1.7 square miles (4.4 km^{2}), all land.

=== Climate ===
The climate in this area is characterized by hot, humid summers and generally mild to cool winters. According to the Köppen Climate Classification system, Celina has a humid subtropical climate, abbreviated "Cfa" on climate maps.

== Demographics ==
Historical population
Census	Pop.	Note	%±
1890	223		—
1910	467		—
1920	420		−10.1%
1930	756		80.0%
1940	864		14.3%
1950	1,136		31.5%
1960	1,228		8.1%
1970	1,370		11.6%
1980	1,580		15.3%
1990	1,493		−5.5%
2000	1,379		−7.6%
2010	1,495		8.4%
2020	1,422		−4.9%

=== 2020 census ===
As of the 2020 census, Celina had a population of 1,422, 632 households, and 405 families residing in the city.

The median age was 47.6 years. 21.9% of residents were under the age of 18 and 25.7% of residents were 65 years of age or older. For every 100 females there were 87.8 males, and for every 100 females age 18 and over there were 85.2 males age 18 and over.

0.0% of residents lived in urban areas, while 100.0% lived in rural areas.

There were 632 households in Celina, of which 26.9% had children under the age of 18 living in them. Of all households, 34.2% were married-couple households, 23.6% were households with a male householder and no spouse or partner present, and 37.3% were households with a female householder and no spouse or partner present. About 36.2% of all households were made up of individuals and 18.5% had someone living alone who was 65 years of age or older.

There were 709 housing units, of which 10.9% were vacant. The homeowner vacancy rate was 2.5% and the rental vacancy rate was 6.3%.

Racial composition as of the 2020 census
Race	Number	Percent
White	1,352	95.1%
Black or African American	25	1.8%
American Indian and Alaska Native	8	0.6%
Asian	3	0.2%
Native Hawaiian and Other Pacific Islander	1	0.1%
Some other race	7	0.5%
Two or more races	26	1.8%
Hispanic or Latino (of any race)	25	1.8%

=== 2000 census ===
As of the census of 2000, there was a population of 1,379, with 645 households and 383 families residing in the city. The population density was 1,144.0 inhabitants per square mile (441.7/km^{2}). There were 709 housing units at an average density of 588.2 per square mile (227.1/km^{2}). The racial makeup of the city was 96.01% White, 1.38% African American, 0.51% Native American, 0.29% Asian, 0.07% Pacific Islander, and 1.74% from two or more races. Hispanic or Latino of any race were 0.58% of the population.

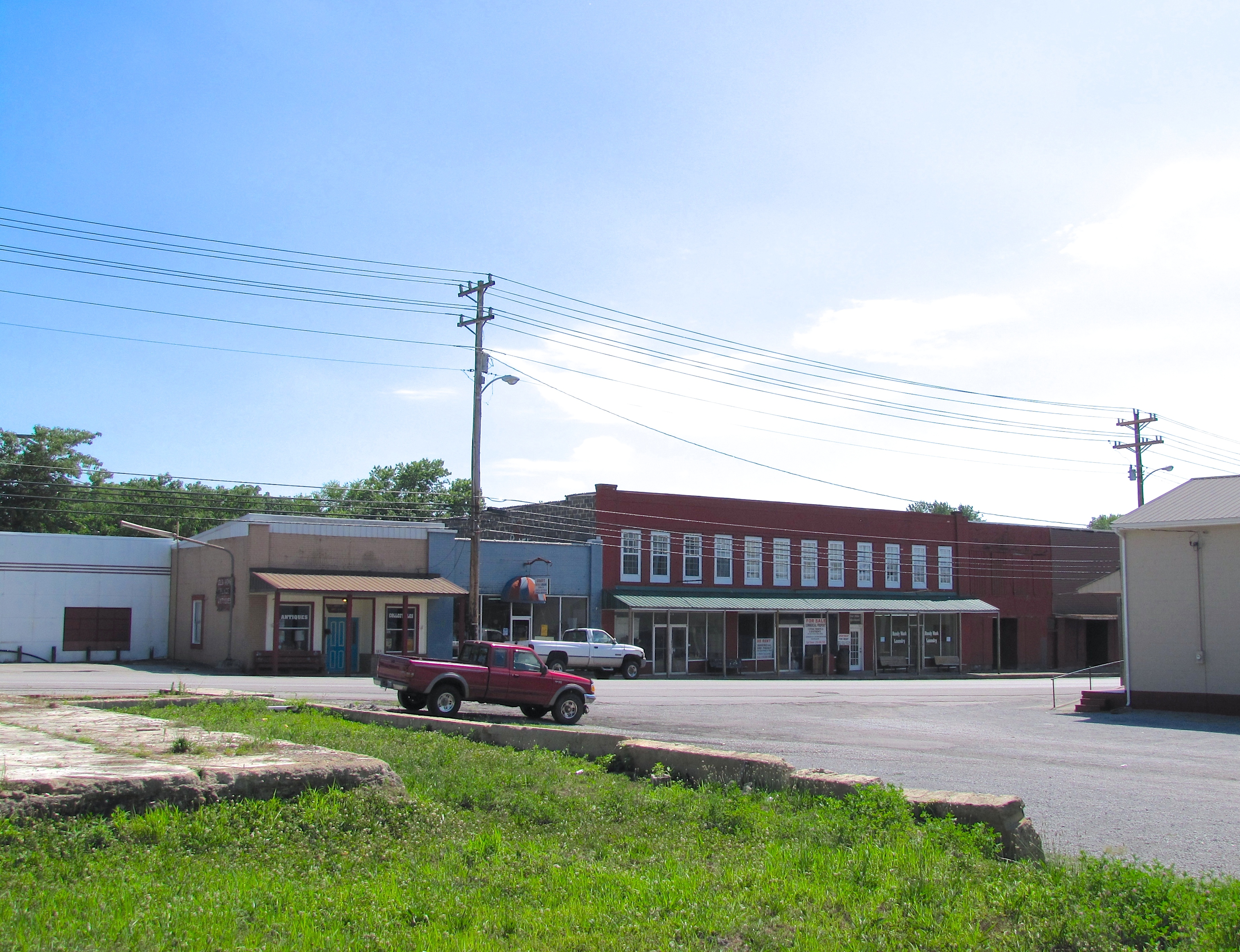
Businesses along Lake Avenue

There were 645 households, out of which 23.9% had children under the age of 18 living with them, 38.0% were married couples living together, 16.0% had a female householder with no husband present, and 40.6% were non-families. 36.7% of all households were made up of individuals, and 17.8% had someone living alone who was 65 years of age or older. The average household size was 2.12 and the average family size was 2.75.

In the city, the population was spread out, with 21.2% under the age of 18, 7.5% from 18 to 24, 26.5% from 25 to 44, 25.6% from 45 to 64, and 19.2% who were 65 years of age or older. The median age was 41 years. For every 100 females, there were 79.6 males. For every 100 females age 18 and over, there were 79.7 males.

The median income for a household in the city was $19,435, and the median income for a family was $29,732. Males had a median income of $21,494 versus $15,096 for females. The per capita income for the city was $12,328. About 20.5% of families and 28.2% of the population were below the poverty line, including 41.5% of those under age 18 and 28.1% of those age 65 or over.

== Notable people ==
- Trae Crowder, comedian and author
