= Standing Stone State Park =

State Park in Overton County, Tennessee, United States of America

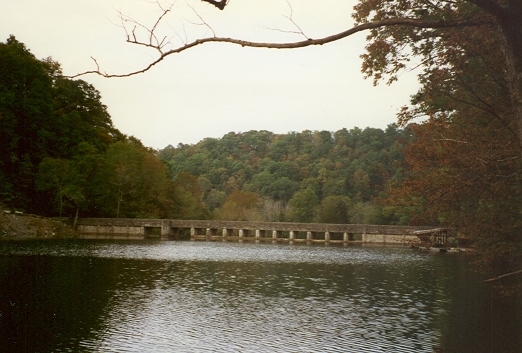
- Standing Stone Lake
- Interactive map of Standing Stone State Park
- Type: Tennessee State Park
- Location: Overton County, Tennessee
- Coordinates: 36°28′16″N 85°24′56″W
- Area: 855 acres (346 ha)
- Created: 1939; 1955
- Operator: Tennessee Department of Environment and Conservation
- Website: Official website
- Standing Stone Rustic Park Historic District
- U.S. National Register of Historic Places
- U.S. Historic district
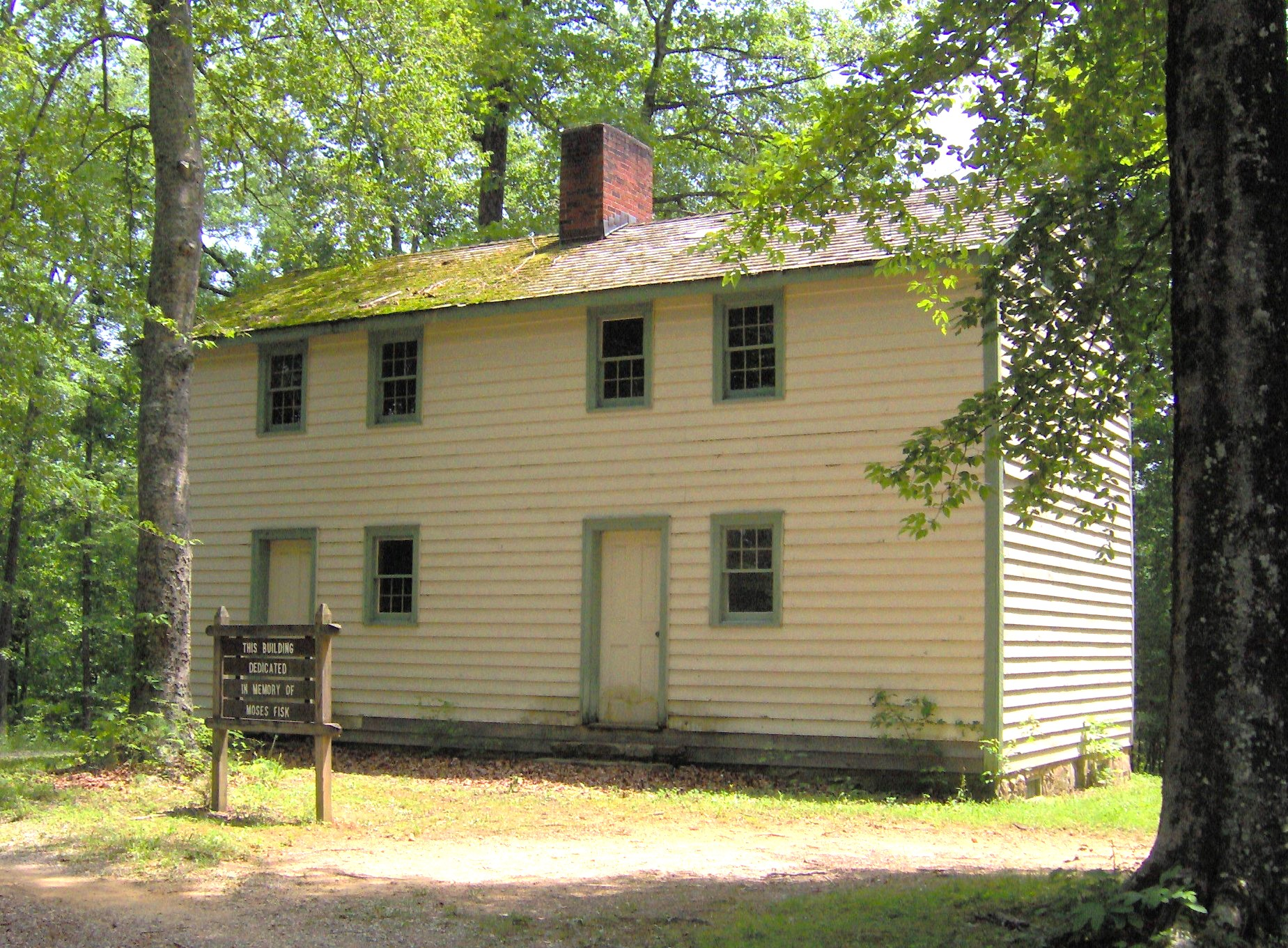
- Home of prominent early Overton County pioneer Moses Fiske (1754-1843), near the park entrance; Now demolished.
- Nearest city: Livingston, Tennessee
- Built: 1880s-1949
- NRHP reference No.: 86002794
- Added to NRHP: 1986

Standing Stone State Park is a state park in Overton County, Tennessee, in the southeastern United States. The park consists of 855 acres (3.46 km^{2}) along the shoreline of the man-made 69-acre (0.28 km^{2}) Standing Stone Lake. The 11,000-acre (45 km^{2}) Standing Stone State Forest surrounds the park.

The park and forest were developed in the 1930s as part of New Deal-era initiatives to relocate impoverished farmers and restore forests from degraded and heavily eroded lands. The park was named after the Standing Stone, a mysterious rock believed to be of Native American origin or importance that once stood along the old Walton Road at what is now Monterey. The park offers canoeing, camping, lodging, hiking and many other activities.

== Geographical setting ==
Standing Stone State Park is situated atop the eastern section of the Highland Rim, a plateau-like upland that surrounds the Nashville Basin. The park is located roughly halfway between the rim's edge along the basin to the west and the higher Cumberland Plateau to the east. The Dale Hollow Lake impoundment of the Obey River dominates the area just a few miles to the north.

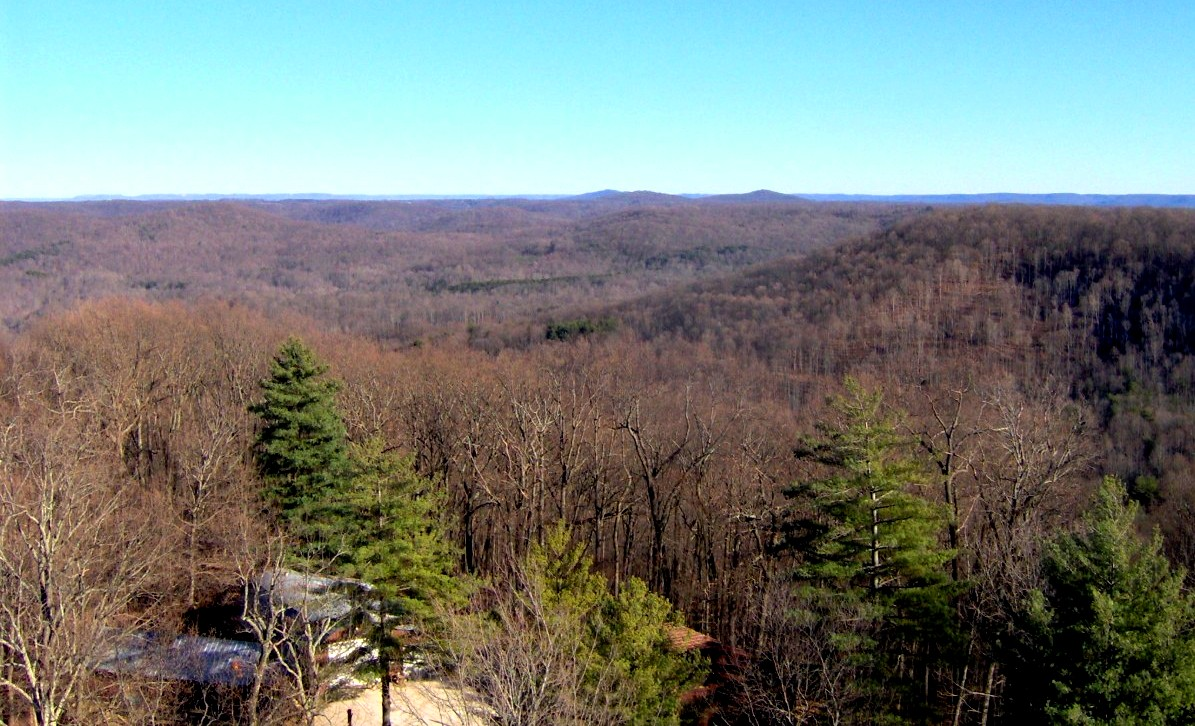
Standing Stone State Forest in December, looking northeast from the Goodpasture Mountain Firetower

Mill Creek, the park's major stream, flows down from its source on Reynolds Mountain (near Allons) to the east and winds its way westward through the hills of northern Overton County before emptying into the Cumberland River. At Standing Stone State Park, the steep ridge upon which the park's main facilities are located briefly pushes the westward-flowing Mill Creek southward through a horseshoe bend. At this bend, two of Mill Creek's tributaries, Morgan Creek and Bryans Fork, join Mill Creek at the southeast and southwest, respectively, to form a natural X-shaped body of water. Standing Stone Dam impounds the creek immediately downstream from the bend, forming the X-shaped Standing Stone Lake. Ridges and high hills rise above the lake on all sides, namely 1,455-foot (443 m) Cooper Mountain to the east and 1,493-foot (455 m) Goodpasture Mountain to the southwest.

Tennessee State Route 136, which runs north-to-south, traverses Standing Stone State Park. The road intersects the east-west Tennessee State Route 85 at the community of Hilham just south of the park and intersects the east-west Tennessee State Route 52 just north of the park. Beyond Hilham, SR 136 continues southward to Cookeville, where it intersects Interstate 40. The town of Livingston, where SR 52 and SR 85 intersect, is just southeast of the park.

== Standing Stone State Forest ==
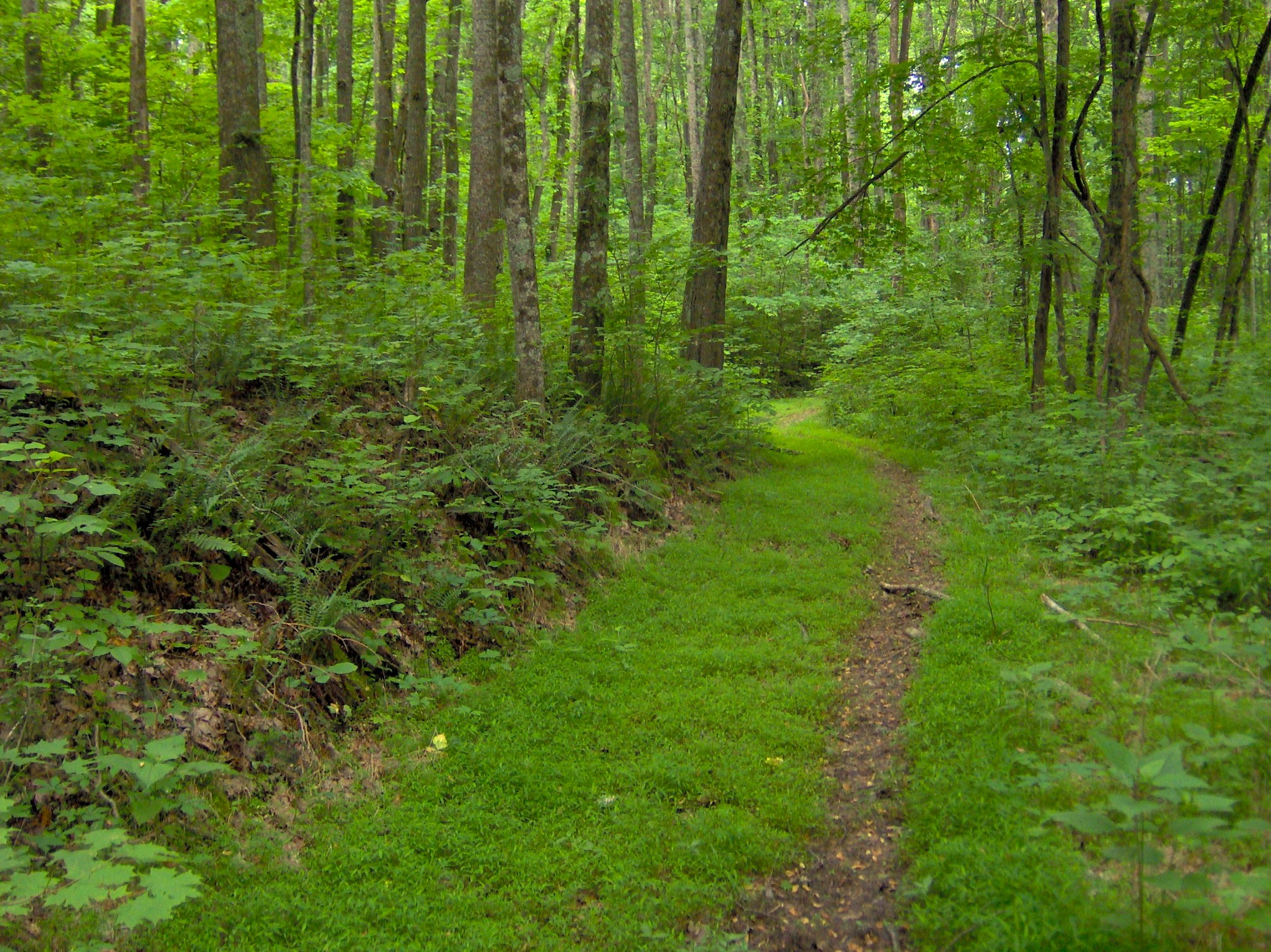
Hardwood forest along the crest of Cooper Mountain

Standing Stone State Park is surrounded by Standing Stone State Forest, which is managed by the Tennessee Division of Forestry. Unlike the state park, the state forest does not have recreational facilities, although public access is permitted. The boundary between the state forest and state park is clearly marked with signs, blazes, or ribbons.

When the United States Department of Agriculture acquired the land for Standing Stone State Forest in the 1930s, the forest had been damaged and depleted by forest fires, logging, and poor farming practices such as row cropping. Standing Stone was designated a state forest in 1961, six years after the U.S. government officially deeded the land to the State of Tennessee. The forest consists of 89% upland hardwoods, 6.8% pine, and 4% mixed hardwood and pine. 34% of the trees in the forest are over 80 years old, 48% are between 50 and 80 years old, and 18% are less than 50 years old.

== History ==
Native Americans were living in substantial semi-permanent villages and rock shelters in Northern Overton County as early as the Archaic period (c. 8000-1000 BC). According to Native American legends, the Overton area was part of a vast region long disputed by Algonquian-speaking tribes (such as the Shawnee) and Iroquoian-speaking tribes (such as the Cherokee). By the time the first Euro-American explorers arrived in Overton County in the mid-18th century, the Cherokee were in control of the area. The Cherokee chief Nettle Carrier operated out of a camp located along the creek that now bears his name a few miles east of the park. Nettle Carrier left the area in the Fall of 1799.

Long hunters, who were among the first Euro-Americans to explore the Middle Tennessee region, were active in the Standing Stone area as early as the 1760s. These hunters were drawn to the region by the Cumberland River, the headwaters of which they followed westward from Virginia. Daniel Boone and Richard Callaway are believed to have camped at the mouth of Mill Creek around 1763. A few years later, a long hunting expedition led by Kasper Mansker camped in the Oak Hill area, near modern Livingston. While at Oak Hill, a member of Mansker's expedition named Robert Crockett was ambushed and killed by hostile Cherokees.

The park's namesake was a mysterious stone which according to the region's earliest pioneers was revered by Native Americans. William Walton discovered the stone at what is now Monterey (appx. 20 miles (32 km) southeast of the park) in the late 1780s while building the Walton Road. The stone originally stood around 10 feet (3.0 m) tall and was shaped like a dog sitting on its hind legs. The purpose of the stone, if any, remains unknown. Some accounts claim that the stone marked the boundary between the territories of the Cherokee and Shawnee, or other Native American tribes. Others say it was a guidepost used by Cherokee hunting parties. Whatever its original purpose, the stone was a well-known landmark for migrants travelling between East and Middle Tennessee in the early 19th century. A community known as "Standing Stone" (later renamed Monterey) developed along the Walton Road in the stone's vicinity. The Standing Stone was dynamited in 1893 to make way for railroad construction. Shortly after it was destroyed, a local society known as the Improved Order of the Redmen retrieved and preserved several pieces of the stone. In 1895, the order placed one of these pieces (which they had engraved) atop a monument at Monterey City Park, where it remains today.

=== Development of the park ===
Standing Stone State Park was one of a series of New Deal-era projects of the Works Project Administration and the Resettlement Administration aimed at relocating impoverished farmers living on badly eroded lands and restoring the forests to these lands. Work began in 1935 with a three-fold purpose— relocating farmers in the Mill Creek area, restoring the forest and controlling erosion, and creating recreational opportunities for area residents. The work was carried out by the Resettlement Administration, the WPA, and the Civilian Conservation Corps under the general supervision of the United States Forest Service. The land was leased to the Tennessee Division of State Parks in 1939.

During World War II, development was largely halted and many of the park's facilities fell into disrepair. After the war, the cabins were renovated, the lake was drained and restocked with fish, and a major leak in the dam was repaired. The United States Department of Agriculture officially deeded the land to the State of Tennessee in 1955.

== Park facilities and events ==
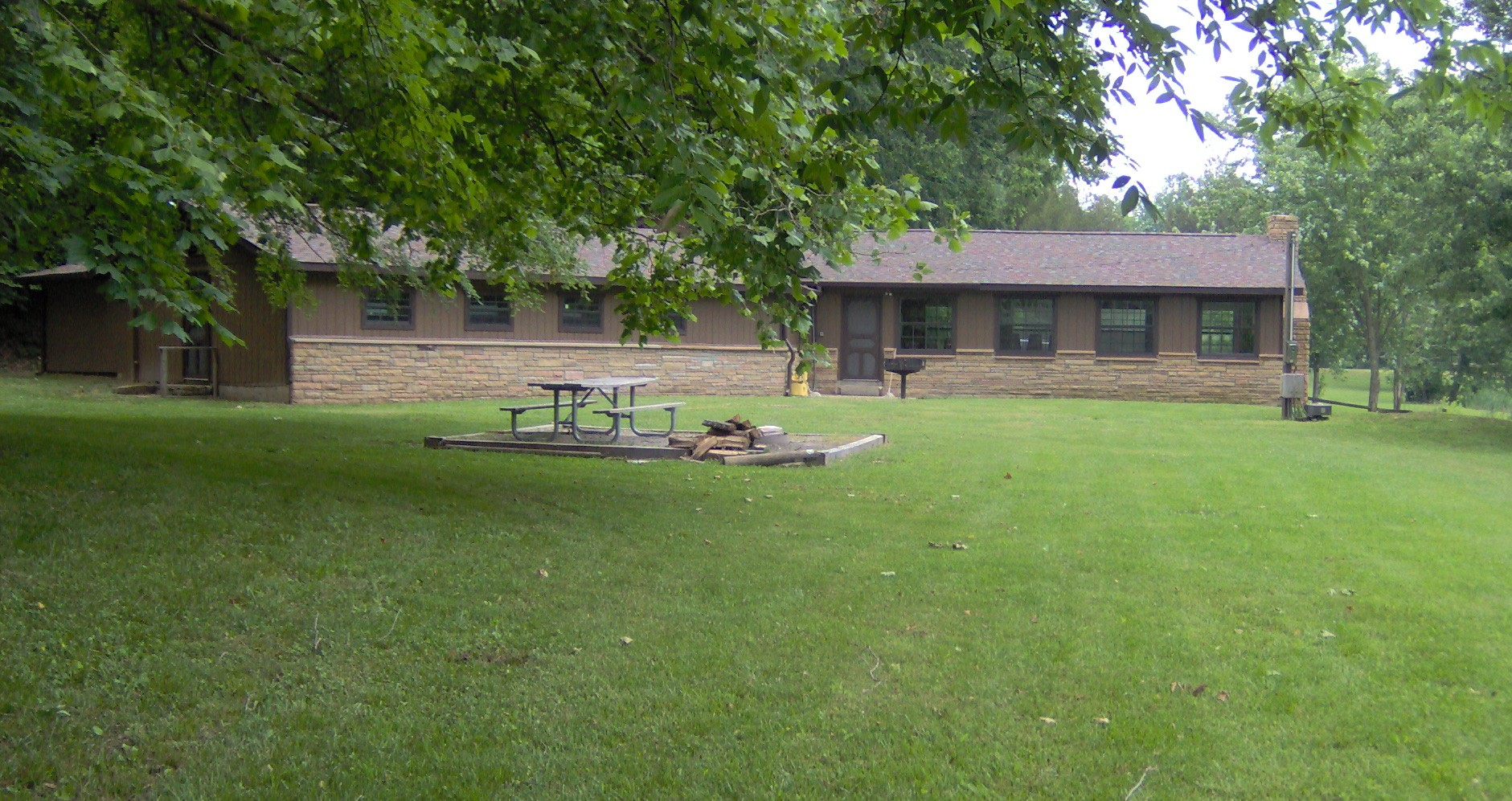
Overton Lodge

Recreational facilities at Standing Stone State Park include a 36-site campground, 21 cabins ranging from rustic to modern, four group lodges, an Olympic-size pool, multiple picnic areas, and an amphitheatre. Most of these facilities (along with the visitor center) are located atop the steep ridge on the north shore of the lake. The lone exception is Overton Lodge, one of the four group lodges, which is located along the lake's east shore.

Over 8 miles (13 km) of hiking trails are maintained in the park and forest. The most popular trail is the Lake Trail, which descends from the visitor center to Standing Stone Dam and parallels most of the north shore of the lake before reascending to the cabin area. The most substantial trail is the 8-mile (13 km) Cooper Mountain Loop Trail, which circles through several miles of the state forest on the slopes of Cooper Mountain before reentering the state park near Overton Lodge.

The National Rolley Hole Marbles Championship is held every September at Standing Stone State Park. Rolley hole is a type of marbles game popular with marble enthusiasts in the Tennessee-Kentucky region. Other annual events include the Spring Naturalist Rally in April and the Standing Stone Car Show in October.

== Photo gallery ==
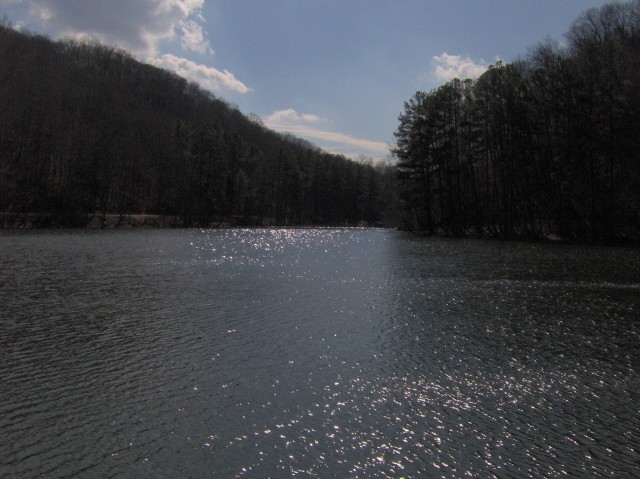
Standing Stone Lake, looking toward its Bryans Fork embayment

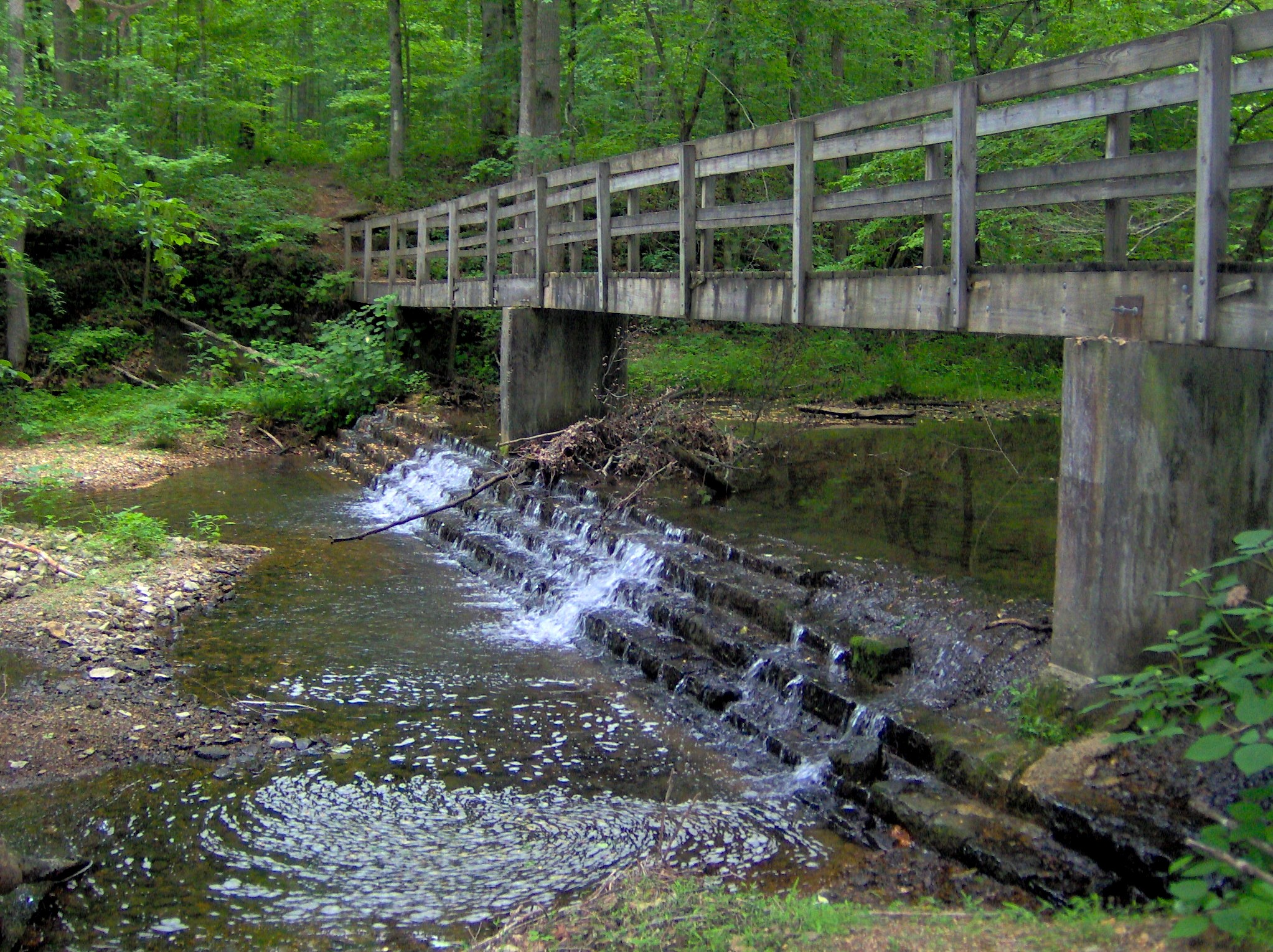
Bridge over Mill Creek connecting the Cooper Mountain and Mill Creek trails

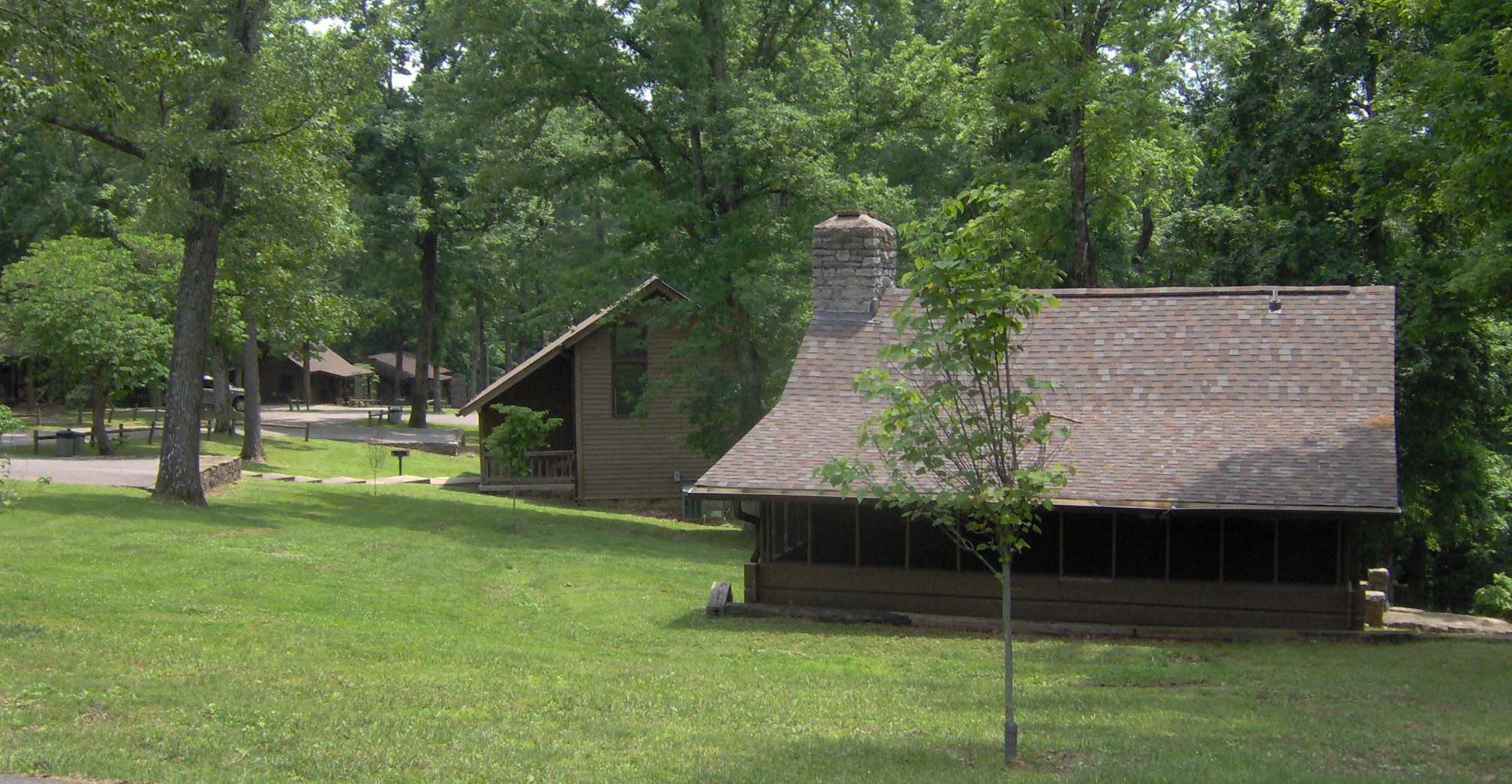
Standing Stone State Park cabin area

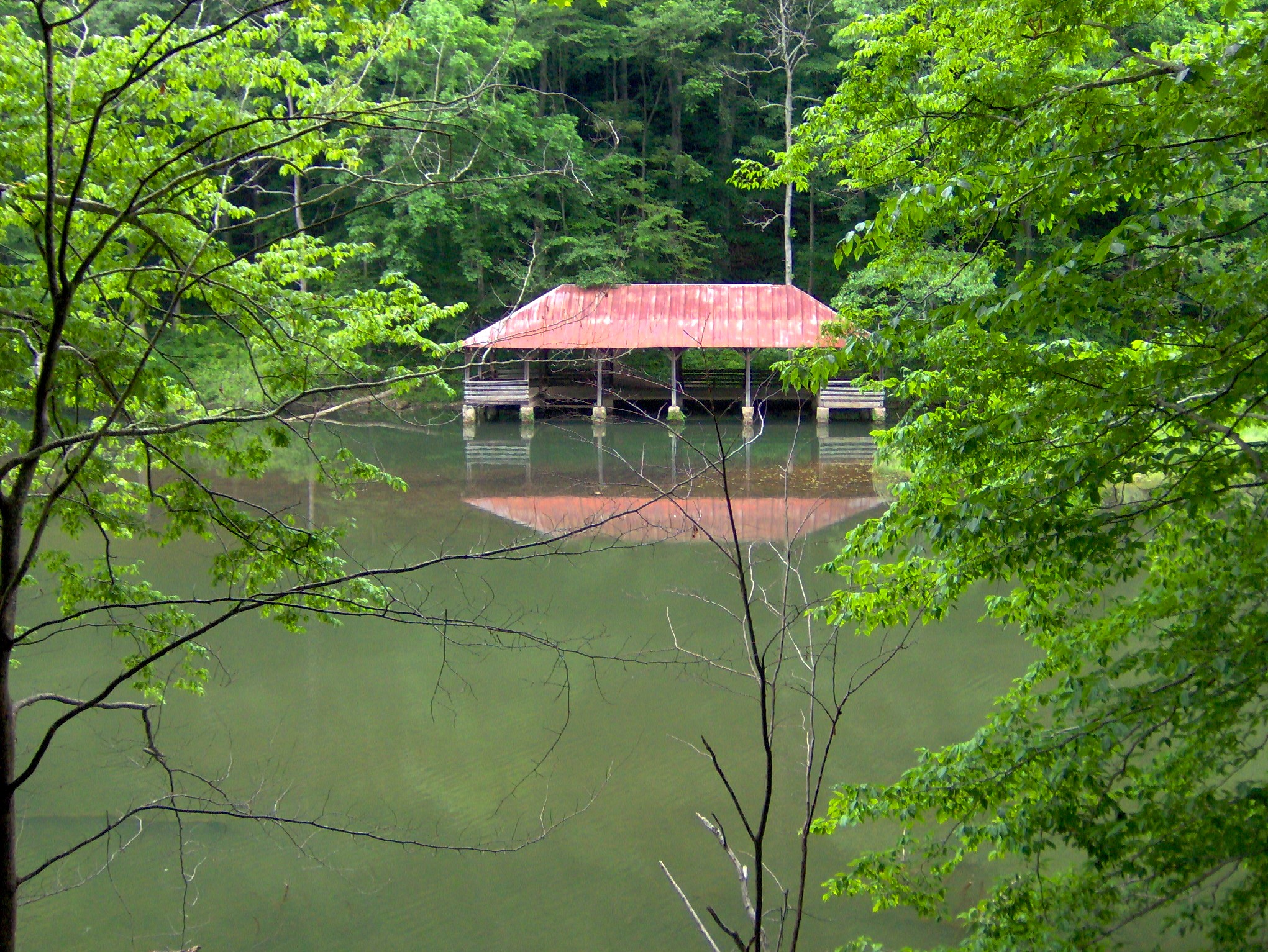
Boathouse on Standing Stone Lake

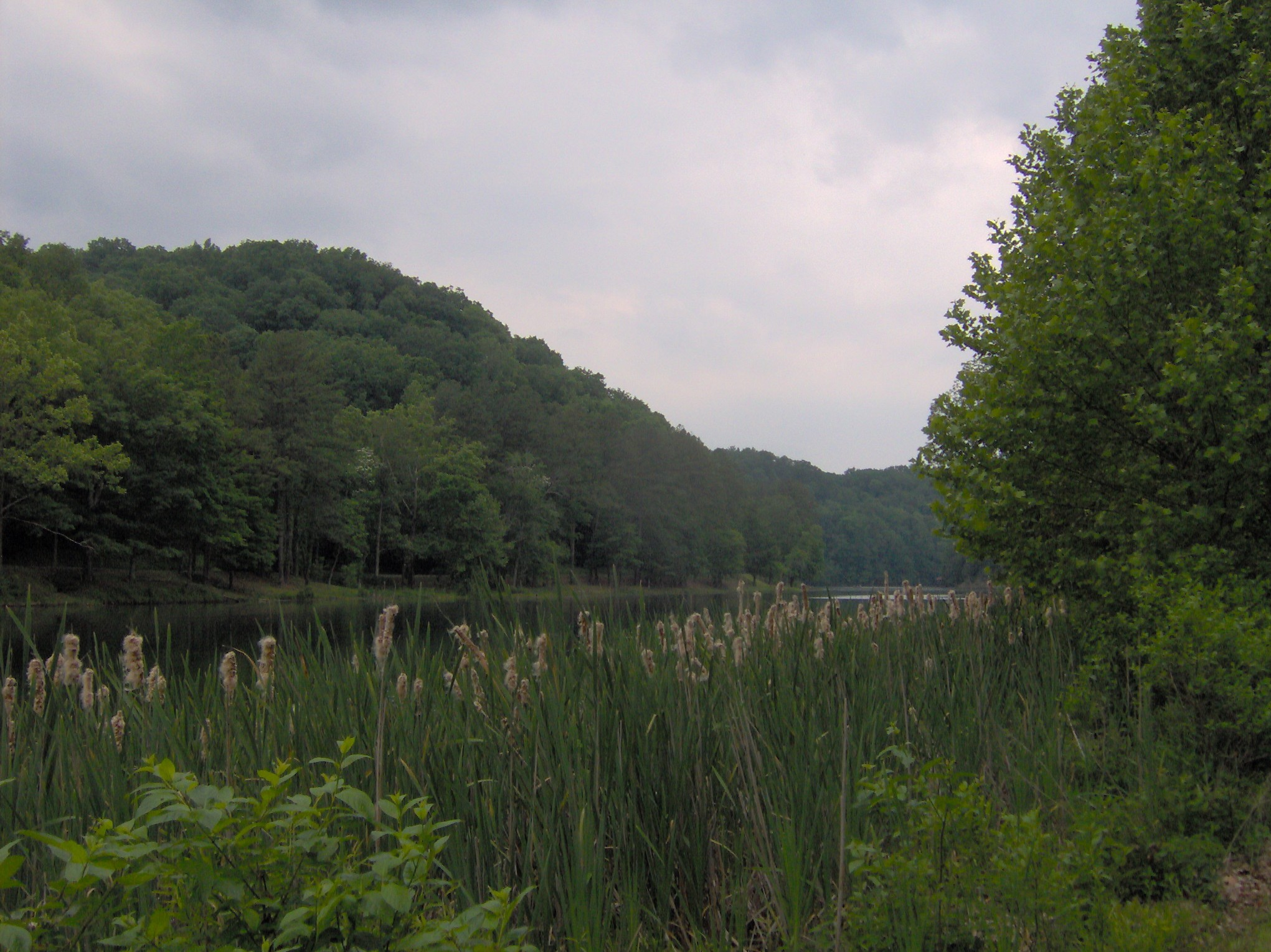
Standing Stone Lake's east shore, near Overton Lodge

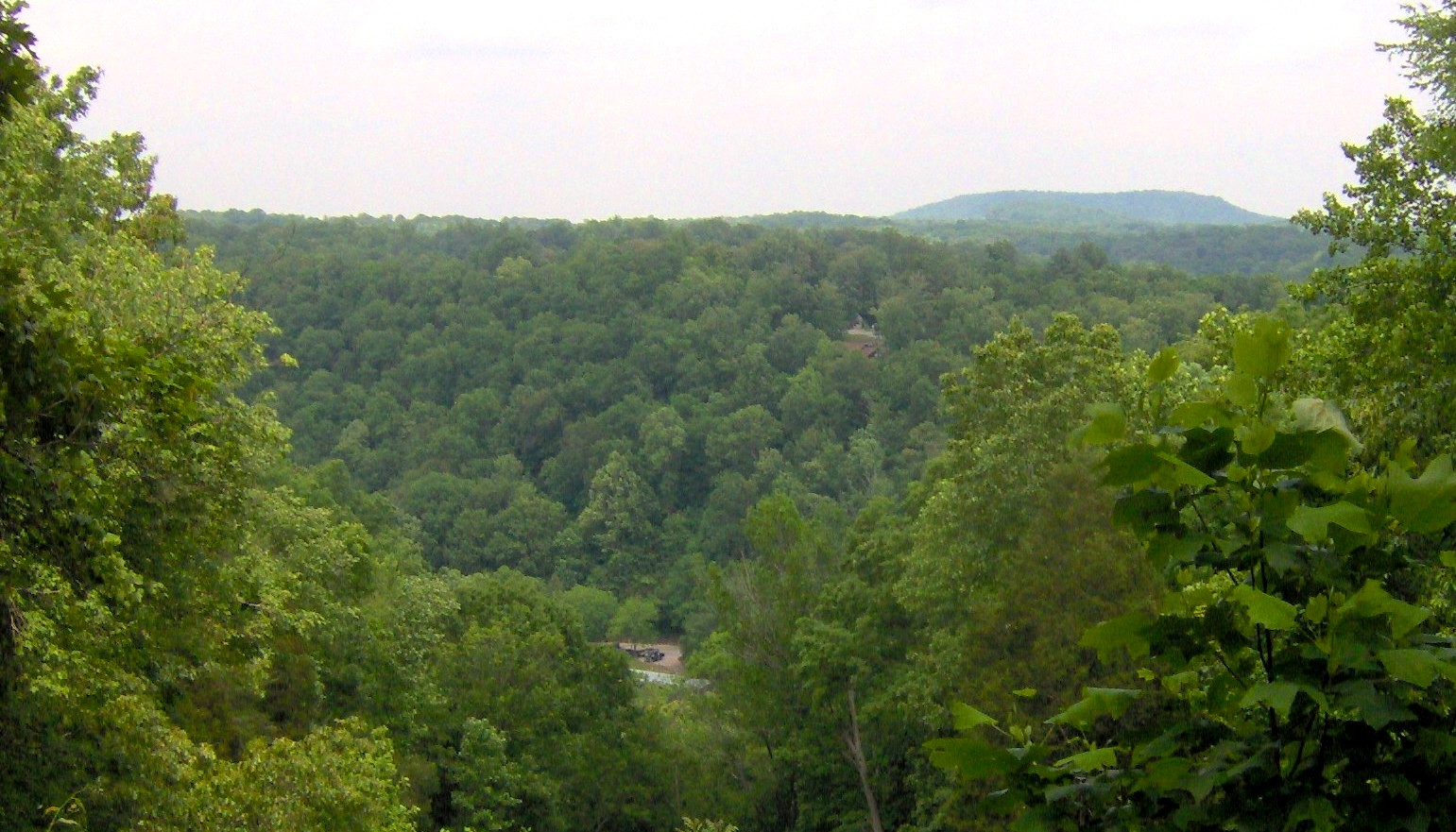
View looking northeast across the park from a scenic overlook just off SR 136
