= Hilham, Tennessee =

Hilham
- Unincorporated community
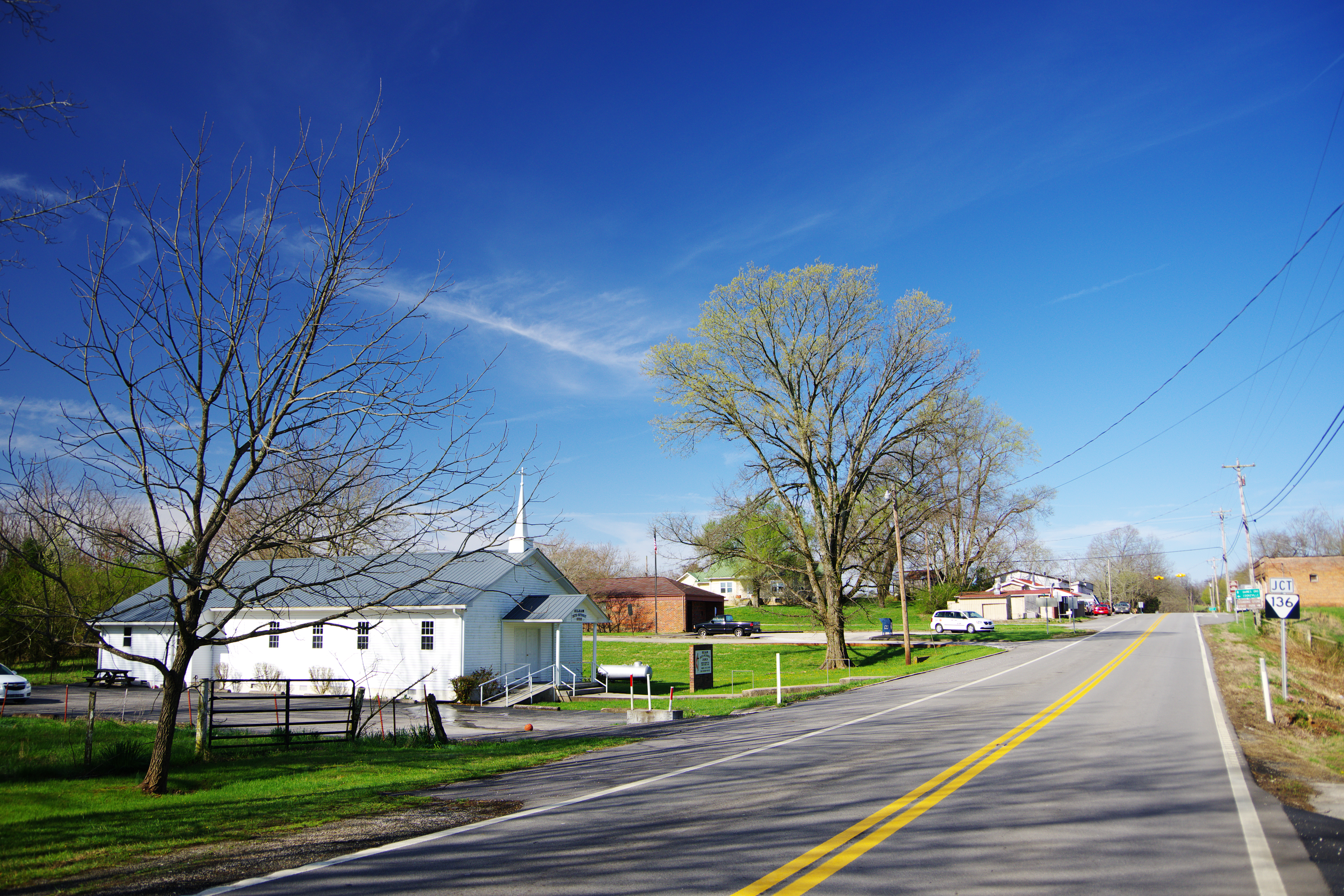
- SR 85 (Hilham Highway) in Hilham

- Location within the state of Tennessee Hilham (the United States)
- Coordinates: 36°24′51″N 85°26′30″W
- Country: United States
- State: Tennessee
- County: Overton
- Founded: 1797
- Named for: Combination of "hill" and "hamlet"

Area
  - Total: 3.53 sq mi (9.15 km^{2})
  - Land: 3.53 sq mi (9.15 km^{2})
  - Water: 0 sq mi (0.00 km^{2})
- Elevation: 1,093 ft (333 m)

Population (2020)
  - Total: 338
  - Density: 95.7/sq mi (36.96/km^{2})
- Time zone: UTC-6 (Central (CST))
  - Summer (DST): UTC-5 (CDT)
- ZIP codes: 38568
- Area code: 931
- FIPS code: 47-34580
- GNIS feature ID: 1287776

Hilham is an unincorporated community in Overton County, Tennessee. The community is situated around the junction of Tennessee State Route 136 (which runs north-to-south) and Tennessee State Route 85 (which runs east-to-west). Although not a census-designated place, Hilham is part of a Zip Code Tabulation Area (38568) that covers most of rural northwest Overton County and part of northeast Jackson County. As of the 2000 census, the population of this entire area was less than 2000.

Hilham was established in 1797 by Dartmouth graduate Moses Fisk (1759-1840), who believed the site was the geographic center of the United States (at the time, the Mississippi River was still the nation's western boundary). Fisk platted Hilham so that roads radiated out from the center of the community to the north, south, east and west, believing that Hilham would eventually be the ultimate crossroads of the new nation. In 1806, Fisk established one of the first female academies in the southeast at Hilham.

The 11,000-acre (45 km^{2}) Standing Stone State Park and Forest is located 5 miles (8.0 km) north of Hilham along State Route 136.

== Demographics ==
Historical population
Census	Pop.	Note	%±
2020	338		—
U.S. Decennial Census
