= Livingston, Tennessee =

- Town
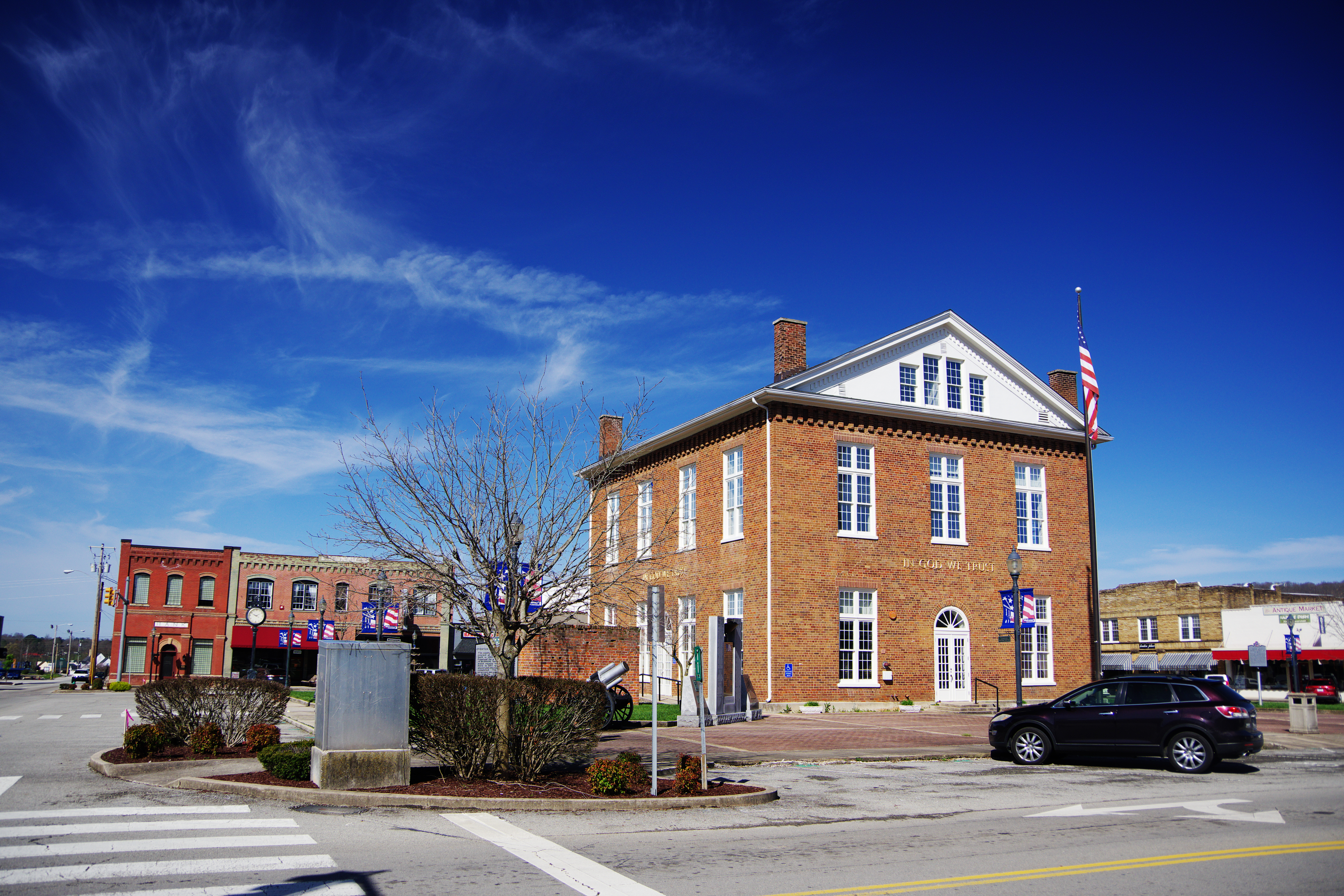
- Courthouse Square in Livingston

- Location of Livingston in Overton County, Tennessee.
- Coordinates: 36°23′13″N 85°19′32″W
- Country: United States
- State: Tennessee
- County: Overton
- Founded: 1833
- Incorporated: 1907
- Named for: Edward Livingston

Area
  - Total: 6.53 sq mi (16.91 km^{2})
  - Land: 6.51 sq mi (16.86 km^{2})
  - Water: 0.023 sq mi (0.06 km^{2})
- Elevation: 1,037 ft (316 m)

Population (2020)
  - Total: 3,905
  - Density: 600.0/sq mi (231.66/km^{2})
- Time zone: UTC-6 (Central (CST))
  - Summer (DST): UTC-5 (CDT)
- ZIP code: 38570
- Area code: 931
- FIPS code: 47-43140
- GNIS feature ID: 1291738
- Website: www.cityoflivingston.net

Livingston is a town in Overton County, Tennessee, United States, and serves as the county seat. The population was 3,905 at the 2020 census and 4,058 at the 2010 census. The current mayor, Lori Elder Burnette, Livingston's first female mayor, began serving her mayoral position on August 29, 2024.

Livingston is part of the Cookeville, Tennessee Micropolitan Statistical Area with a 2023 population of 148,226.

== History ==
The town of Livingston, Tennessee was purchased on August 10, 1833. Forty acres of land was bought for two hundred dollars. Livingston was named after Edward Livingston (1764–1836), who served as Secretary of State under President Andrew Jackson. In 1833, in a close and controversial election, the residents of Overton County voted to move the county seat from the town of Monroe to Livingston.

While Livingston has been home to many people it was home to Governor Albert H. Roberts. Along with working in Livingston Albert H. Roberts also worked at the Alpine Institute. The Alpine Institution was a private Presbyterian mission school located in Overton County, Tennessee. Along with Livingston being home to A.H. Roberts, it's also home to one of only 35 Iron Lungs in the country.

The National Register of Historic Places includes three buildings in Livingston: the Overton County Courthouse, the American Legion Hut, and Gov. Albert H. Roberts Law Office.

== Geography ==
Livingston is located at 36°23′13″N 85°19′32″W (36.386942, -85.325568), approximately 15 miles north by northeast of Cookeville.

According to the United States Census Bureau, the town has a total area of 5.2 square miles (13 km^{2}), of which 5.1 square miles (13 km^{2}) is land and 0.04 square miles (0.10 km^{2}) (0.77%) is water. Elevation in the town ranges from 1,027 ft (313 m) to 1700 ft (518.16 m)

=== Climate ===
Livingston's climate is humid subtropical (Cfa) under the Köppen system, with mild winters and hot, humid summers. Under the Trewartha system, it is a borderline humid subtropical (Cf) and oceanic (Do) climate, supported by the fact that subtropical plants like Southern Magnolia and the occasional Needle Palm can reach their full potential here but struggle much further north. Camellia and Bananas are often seen growing in the town.

Climate data for Livingston, Tennessee (1991–2020 normals, extremes 1961–present)
Month	Jan	Feb	Mar	Apr	May	Jun	Jul	Aug	Sep	Oct	Nov	Dec	Year
Record high °F (°C)	73 (23)	82 (28)	86 (30)	91 (33)	94 (34)	106 (41)	108 (42)	104 (40)	100 (38)	95 (35)	84 (29)	77 (25)	108 (42)
Mean daily maximum °F (°C)	46.5 (8.1)	50.9 (10.5)	59.5 (15.3)	69.7 (20.9)	77.2 (25.1)	84.1 (28.9)	87.1 (30.6)	86.7 (30.4)	81.4 (27.4)	71.1 (21.7)	59.9 (15.5)	50.2 (10.1)	68.7 (20.4)
Daily mean °F (°C)	36.9 (2.7)	40.2 (4.6)	47.7 (8.7)	57.0 (13.9)	65.4 (18.6)	73.0 (22.8)	76.6 (24.8)	75.7 (24.3)	69.7 (20.9)	58.2 (14.6)	47.8 (8.8)	40.4 (4.7)	57.4 (14.1)
Mean daily minimum °F (°C)	27.2 (−2.7)	29.6 (−1.3)	36.0 (2.2)	44.3 (6.8)	53.5 (11.9)	61.9 (16.6)	66.1 (18.9)	64.7 (18.2)	58.1 (14.5)	45.4 (7.4)	35.8 (2.1)	30.6 (−0.8)	46.1 (7.8)
Record low °F (°C)	−25 (−32)	−15 (−26)	4 (−16)	19 (−7)	27 (−3)	35 (2)	45 (7)	43 (6)	27 (−3)	20 (−7)	2 (−17)	−18 (−28)	−25 (−32)
Average precipitation inches (mm)	4.70 (119)	4.66 (118)	4.97 (126)	4.81 (122)	4.74 (120)	4.75 (121)	4.62 (117)	4.25 (108)	3.87 (98)	2.90 (74)	3.70 (94)	5.48 (139)	53.45 (1,358)
Average snowfall inches (cm)	0.3 (0.76)	1.5 (3.8)	0.4 (1.0)	0.0 (0.0)	0.0 (0.0)	0.0 (0.0)	0.0 (0.0)	0.0 (0.0)	0.0 (0.0)	0.0 (0.0)	0.0 (0.0)	0.1 (0.25)	2.3 (5.8)
Average precipitation days (≥ 0.01 in)	8.0	7.4	9.3	9.8	10.0	10.4	9.1	7.2	6.3	6.0	7.6	9.0	100.1
Average snowy days (≥ 0.1 in)	0.4	0.6	0.2	0.0	0.0	0.0	0.0	0.0	0.0	0.0	0.0	0.2	1.4
Source: NOAA

== Demographics ==
Historical population
Census	Pop.	Note	%±
1850	881		—
1860	268		−69.6%
1870	240		−10.4%
1880	312		30.0%
1890	320		2.6%
1910	1,421		—
1920	1,215		−14.5%
1930	1,526		25.6%
1940	1,527		0.1%
1950	2,082		36.3%
1960	2,817		35.3%
1970	3,050		8.3%
1980	3,372		10.6%
1990	3,809		13.0%
2000	3,498		−8.2%
2010	4,058		16.0%
2020	3,905		−3.8%

=== 2020 census ===
As of the 2020 census, Livingston had a population of 3,905. The median age was 44.1 years. 19.5% of residents were under the age of 18 and 23.3% of residents were 65 years of age or older. For every 100 females there were 90.1 males, and for every 100 females age 18 and over there were 85.4 males age 18 and over.

0.0% of residents lived in urban areas, while 100.0% lived in rural areas.

There were 1,665 households and 963 families in Livingston, of which 26.2% had children under the age of 18 living in them. Of all households, 37.4% were married-couple households, 18.9% were households with a male householder and no spouse or partner present, and 37.2% were households with a female householder and no spouse or partner present. About 38.1% of all households were made up of individuals and 21.3% had someone living alone who was 65 years of age or older.

There were 1,888 housing units, of which 11.8% were vacant. The homeowner vacancy rate was 1.7% and the rental vacancy rate was 8.4%.

Livingston racial composition
Race	Number	Percentage
White (non-Hispanic)	3,645	93.34%
Black or African American (non-Hispanic)	30	0.77%
Native American	13	0.33%
Asian	25	0.64%
Other/Mixed	129	3.3%
Hispanic or Latino	63	1.61%

=== 2000 census ===
As of the census of 2000, there were 3,498 people, 1,543 households, and 924 families residing in the town. The population density was 680.1 inhabitants per square mile (262.6/km^{2}). There were 1,746 housing units at an average density of 339.5 per square mile (131.1/km^{2}). The racial makeup of the town was 88.08% White, 0.60% African American, 5.29% Native American, 0.17% Asian, 0.14% Pacific Islander, 0.14% from other races, and 0.57% from two or more races. Hispanic or Latino of any race were 5.31% of the population.

Of the 1,543 households, 22.9% had children under the age of 18 living with them, 42.3% were married couples living together, 14.2% had a female householder with no husband present, and 40.1% were non-families. 37.1% of all households were made up of individuals, and 18.1% had someone living alone who was 65 years of age or older. The average household size was 2.15 and the average family size was 2.80.

The population was 20.0% under the age of 18, 8.6% from 18 to 24, 24.3% from 25 to 44, 23.8% from 45 to 64, and 23.2% who were 65 years of age or older. The median age was 43 years. For every 100 females, there were 83.1 males. For every 100 females age 18 and over, there were 77.5 males.

The median income for a household in the town was $23,309, and the median income for a family was $34,141. Males had a median income of $25,183 versus $20,991 for females. The per capita income for the town was $15,558. About 14.4% of families and 19.3% of the population were below the poverty line, including 32.7% of those under age 18 and 20.0% of those age 65 or over.

== Education ==
Livingston is currently home to five schools: Livingston Academy (9-12), Livingston Middle School (5-8), and A.H. Roberts Elementary School (K-4). Livingston is home to a branch campus of the Tennessee College of Applied Technology and a satellite campus of Volunteer State Community College.

== Notable people ==
- Michael J. McCulley, U.S. Astronaut
- Albert H. Roberts, former Governor of Tennessee
- Roy Roberts, Blues artist
