= Blackburn Fork River =

Blackburn Fork River Blackburn Fork State Scenic River

Location
- Country: United States
- State: Tennessee
- Cities: Cookeville

Physical characteristics
- Mouth
  - location: Roaring River
  - coordinates: 36°20′50″N 85°33′44″W

Basin features
- Waterfalls: Cummins Falls

Blackburn Fork River is a river located in Jackson County, Tennessee, United States. It originates near Cookeville, Tennessee, and is a major tributary of the Roaring River. It contains the seventy-five foot high waterfall, Cummins Falls, and runs within Cummins Falls State Park. Hiking, swimming, and fishing are popular activities on the river.

The river's source is at the confluence of West Blackburn Fork Creek and East Blackburn Fork Creek, both of which are large creeks beginning in the north-central portion of Putnam County and end in Jackson County. East Blackburn Fork Creek drains northern portions of Cookeville and is crossed by Dodson Branch Road, while West Blackburn Fork Creek drains suburbs between Cookeville and Baxter and is crossed by Gainesboro Grade.

Blackburn Fork is designated as a Tennessee State Scenic River, a title also belonging to Spring Creek, the Roaring River's other major tributary. Shortly after the confluence of West and East Blackburn Fork Creek, the river is crossed by Cummins Mill Road (SR 477) and enters Cummins Falls State Park. The waterfall within this state park is popular for both tourists and regional visitors. Once the river leaves the park, it is paralleled by Blackburn Fork Road, a curvy and very narrow chipsealed road maintained by the Jackson County Highway Department. This road connects Cummins Mill Road at the state park to Dodson Branch Road east of Gainesboro, Tennessee along the Roaring River. Any travelers on Dodson Branch Road choosing this alternate route avoid the unincorporated town of Dodson Branch. However, usually only locals use the route unless travelers seek scenery due to the route being narrower and less direct; that being said, it still acts as a collector road in southeastern Jackson County.
