= Tennessee State Route 477 =

Highway in Tennessee

State Route 477
- Cummins Mill Road
- TN 477 highlighted in red

Route information
- Maintained by TDOT
- Length: 5.4 mi (8.7 km)
- Existed: 2011–12–present

Major junctions
- West end: SR 290 in Bloomington Springs
- East end: SR 135 near Dodson Branch

Location
- Country: United States
- State: Tennessee
- Counties: Jackson

Highway system
- Tennessee State Routes; Interstate; US; State
← SR 476	→ I-640

State Route 477 (SR 477), also known as Cummins Mill Road, is a 5.4-mile-long (8.7 km) state highway in Jackson County, Tennessee. It connects SR 290 in Bloomington Springs with SR 135 near Dodson Branch, and it provides access to Cummins Falls State Park.

SR 477 begins at an intersection with SR 290 in Bloomington Springs. The highway travels to the northeast. About half-way between its termini, it passes Cummins Falls State Park. SR 477 crosses over the Blackburn Fork River and proceeds in a northeasterly direction until it meets its eastern terminus at an intersection with SR 135.

== Major intersections ==
The entire route is in Jackson County.

Location	mi	km	Destinations	Notes
Bloomington Springs	0.0	0.0	SR 290 (Old Gainesboro Highway) – Gainesboro, Cookeville	Western terminus
Cummins Falls State Park	2.7	4.3	Blackburn Fork Road – Cummins Falls State Park	
	5.4	8.7	SR 135 (Dodson Branch Highway) – Gainesboro, Dodson Branch, Cookeville	Eastern terminus
1.000 mi = 1.609 km; 1.000 km = 0.621 mi
