= Tennessee State Route 135 =

State highway in Tennessee, United States

State Route 135
- SR 135 highlighted in red

Route information
- Maintained by TDOT
- Length: 62.87 mi (101.18 km)

Major junctions
- South end: SR 289 in Sparta
- SR 111 near Sparta; I-40 in Cookeville; US 70N in Cookeville; SR 53 / SR 56 / SR 85 in Gainesboro
- North end: SR 52 in rural western Clay County

Location
- Country: United States
- State: Tennessee
- Counties: White, Putnam, Jackson, Clay

Highway system
- Tennessee State Routes; Interstate; US; State
← SR 134	→ SR 136

State Route 135 (SR 135) is a north–south secondary state highway located in eastern Middle Tennessee. it originates in White County along SR 289 on the north side of Sparta, and its northern end is in Clay County along SR 52. The total length is 61.5 miles (99.0 km) long, and is entirely a secondary state highway.

== Route description ==
=== White County ===
SR 135 begins on the north side of Sparta at an intersection with SR 289 (Old SR 111) in White County. It goes north along the former alignment of SR 111 before crossing it and having an interchange. SR 135 goes northwest through Bakers Crossroads, where it has an intersection with SR 136 before entering Putnam County.

=== Putnam County ===
SR 135 winds its way north and east, where it passes by Burgess Falls State Park, before having an interchange with I-40 (Exit 286) and entering the city of Cookeville. SR 135 passes through some commercial areas as it travels west of downtown, where it has an intersection with US 70N/SR 24. SR 135 then continues north and has an intersection with SR 290 before traveling northward through rural areas into Jackson County.

=== Jackson County ===
SR 135 has an intersection with SR 477 and passes through Dodson Branch before it becomes extremely curvy as it winds its way north then west to enter Gainesboro to intersect and become concurrent with SR 53 and SR 85 at a y-intersection. They then come to an intersection with SR 56 just north of downtown, where SR 85 and SR 135 turn north along SR 56. They then cross the Cumberland River to leave Gainesboro and continue north to Jennings Creek, where SR 85 splits off and goes west. They then enter Whitleyville and SR 135 splits off from SR 56 and turns north at a y-intersection. SR 135 becomes curvy again as it passes through rugged terrain before crossing into Clay County.

=== Clay County ===
SR 135 winds its way north through the mountains before entering farmland and reaching its northern terminus along SR 52 in western Clay County between Hermitage Springs and Moss.

== Major intersections ==
County	Location	mi	km	Destinations	Notes
White	Sparta	0.0	0.0	SR 289 (N Spring Street) to SR 111 – Sparta	Southern terminus
White		2.0	3.2	SR 111 – Cookeville, Sparta	Interchange
White	Bakers Crossroads	5.5	8.9	SR 136 (Old Kentucky Road) – Cookeville, Hamptons Crossroads, Walling, Rock Island	Provides access to Rock Island State Park
Putnam	Cookeville	16.9	27.2	I-40 – Knoxville, Nashville	I-40 exit 286
Putnam	Cookeville	18.9	30.4	US 70N (W Spring Street/SR 24) – Baxter, Monterey	
Putnam	Cookeville	20.0	32.2	SR 290 west (W 12th Street) – Bloomington Springs	Eastern terminus of SR 290
Jackson		26.8	43.1	SR 477 west (Cummins Mill Road) – Cummins Falls State Park	Eastern terminus of SR 477
Jackson	Gainesboro	41.6	66.9	SR 53 north / SR 85 east (N Grundy Quarles Highway) – Celina, Livingston	Southern end of SR 53/SR 85 concurrency
Jackson	Gainesboro	41.8	67.3	SR 53 south / SR 56 south (N Grundy Quarles Highway) – Downtown, Granville, Baxter	Northern end of SR 53 concurrency; southern end of SR 56 concurrency
Jackson	Gainesboro	41.8	67.3	Ben Wade Stone Memorial Bridge over the Cumberland River	
Jackson		45.8	73.7	SR 85 west – Defeated, Carthage	Northern end of SR 85 concurrency
Jackson	Whitleyville	48.3	77.7	SR 56 north (Jennings Creek Highway) – Red Boiling Springs	Northern end of SR 56 concurrency
Clay		61.5	99.0	SR 52 (Clay County Highway) – Red Boiling Springs, Celina	Northern terminus
1.000 mi = 1.609 km; 1.000 km = 0.621 mi: Concurrency terminus
