= Shady Grove, Jackson County, Tennessee =

Shady Grove, Tennessee
- Unincorporated community
- Location within Tennessee Location within the United States
- Coordinates: 36°15′03″N 85°40′48″W
- Country: United States
- State: Tennessee
- County: Jackson
- Elevation: 1,020 ft (310 m)
- Time zone: UTC-6 (Central (CST))
  - Summer (DST): UTC-5 (CDT)
- Area code: 931
- GNIS feature ID: 1315907

Shady Grove is an unincorporated community in Jackson County, Tennessee, United States. Shady Grove is located on Tennessee State Route 290 7.3 miles (11.7 km) south of Gainesboro.
