= Tennessee State Route 291 =

State highway in Tennessee, United States

State Route 291
- Bloomington Road
- SR 291 highlighted in red

Route information
- Maintained by TDOT
- Length: 2.0 mi (3.2 km)
- Existed: July 1, 1983–present

Major junctions
- South end: US 70N in Double Springs
- North end: SR 56 in Bloomington Springs

Location
- Country: United States
- State: Tennessee
- Counties: Putnam

Highway system
- Tennessee State Routes; Interstate; US; State
← SR 290	→ SR 292

State Route 291 (SR 291), also known as Bloomington Road, is a 2.0-mile-long (3.2 km) north-south state highway in Putnam County, Tennessee in the United States. It connects the communities of Double Springs and Bloomington Springs.

== Route description ==
SR 291 begins at an intersection with US 70N (SR 24) in Double Springs. It winds its way northwest through farmland and rural areas for two miles before entering Bloomington Springs and coming to an end at an intersection with SR 56. The entire route of SR 291 is a rural two-lane highway.

== Major intersections ==
The entire route is in Putnam County.

Location	mi	km	Destinations	Notes
Double Springs	0.0	0.0	US 70N (Nashville Highway/SR 24) – Baxter, Cookeville	Southern terminus
Bloomington Springs	2.0	3.2	SR 56 (Gainesboro Highway) – Baxter, Gainesboro	Northern terminus
1.000 mi = 1.609 km; 1.000 km = 0.621 mi
