= Roaring River (Tennessee) =

Coordinates: 36.2720067°N 85.3355254°W

Location
- Country: United States
- State: Tennessee

Physical characteristics
- Source
  - location: Highland Rim
  - elevation: 509 ft (155 m)
- Mouth
  - location: Cumberland River
- Length: 37.7 mi (60.7 km)

Basin features
- Tributaries
  - left: Spring Creek, Blackburn Fork River

The Roaring River is a 37.7-mile-long (60.7 km) tributary of the Cumberland River in the U.S. state of Tennessee. Via the Cumberland and Ohio rivers, it is part of the Mississippi River watershed.

It rises on the Highland Rim approximately 7 miles (11 km) south of Livingston, Tennessee in Overton County. It initially flows roughly north, then turns largely west for the balance of its course. After crossing into Jackson County, it begins a relatively steep descent, resulting in the namesake "roar" during periods of high flow. The lower portion of its course is designated as a "State Scenic River" under the terms of the Tennessee Wild and Scenic Rivers Act.

The Roaring River empties into the Cordell Hull Lake impoundment of the Cumberland River. A U.S. Army Corps of Engineers recreation area is at and around the actual confluence, which is very near the Jackson County seat of Gainesboro.

== See also ==
- List of rivers of Tennessee
