= 10 MPH =

- Directed by: Hunter Weeks
- Written by: Hunter Weeks
- Produced by: Hunter Weeks; Josh Caldwell; Johnathan F. Keough
- Starring: Hunter Weeks; Josh Caldwell; Johnathan F. Keough
- Edited by: Josh Caldwell
- Music by: Everett Griffiths
- Release dates: April 2006 (Vail Film Festival); May 29, 2007
- Running time: 92 minutes
- Country: United States
- Language: English
- Budget: US $54,000

10 MPH is a 2006 documentary film directed by Hunter Weeks and starring Josh Caldwell with his Segway HT, the two-wheeled electronic scooter. This film, which takes its name from the Segway's average speed, documents Caldwell's 100-day, coast to coast journey across the United States riding the "Human Transporter". The trip started in Seattle, Washington on August 8, 2004 and ended in Boston, Massachusetts on November 18, 2004. 10 MPH has had a favorable reaction at screenings and film festivals and has won several awards.

== Synopsis ==
10 MPH follows the progress of Caldwell as he rides a Segway scooter across the United States from Seattle to Boston, stopping at many places along the way to interact with people. The film focuses on showing the dynamic nature of the US countryside as well as documenting the stories of people Caldwell and Weeks encounter along the way.

10 MPH shows Caldwell, Weeks, and other members of the crew but also provides footage of the people they meet, both helpful and rude. For example, Caldwell and the crew are stopped by an Illinois police officer who admonishes them for traveling at 10 miles per hour (16 km/h) on a road with a 45 miles per hour (72 km/h) speed limit. The filmmakers also document their struggles, from the technical challenges of maintaining the Segway's batteries to the production challenge of losing a producer part way through the filming process.

== Development ==
Dissatisfied with their average corporate jobs, filmmakers Weeks and Caldwell formed a production company, Spinning Blue, in Denver, Colorado prior to beginning production of 10 MPH. They have discussed their lack of training and experience in the film industry, lack of investment capital to make the film, and lack of film industry contacts as challenges at the beginning of the process. Rather than pursuing traditional channels of film making, Weeks and Caldwell used the Web to raise funds and promote 10 MPH. They conceived the idea of making a film before knowing what it would be about. Shortly thereafter, a friend gave them the idea of making a film involving a Segway.

In 2004, Weeks and Caldwell purchased a Segway and decided to film a documentary about traveling across the United States at 10 miles per hour (16 km/h). Caldwell actually rode the scooter while Weeks directed and managed the film footage. Weeks and other members of the production crew followed Caldwell in a car with the film equipment.

They used a Sony PD-150 to capture 180 hours of footage. Post-production occurred back in Denver after the Segway journey with involvement from other members of the Denver film community.

== Distribution ==
10 MPH is available in several ways including on DVD, which premiered on May 29, 2007 in the United States and is available through Netflix and other outlets, and by direct download from the film Web site and from iTunes. Additionally, Weeks and Caldwell spent months in 2007 traveling back over their path to show the finished documentary in theaters along the way.

== Critical response ==
The documentary received generally positive reviews from critics. Review aggregation website Rotten Tomatoes gives the film a score of 80 percent based on reviews from five critics, with a rating average of 7.4 out of 10.

In Wired Magazine, Dylan Tweney wrote that 10 MPH "is about more than just a couple of geeks with their high-tech toy: It's lighthearted and entertaining, with an overarching message about accomplishing your dreams and doing your 'thing.'" Jeff Inglis of the Boston Phoenix compared it with other accounts of American road trips, writing; “What Caldwell and Weeks have made is a road movie, in the tradition, perhaps, of Charles Kuralt’s "On the Road" reports for CBS News, or maybe more like William Least Heat-Moon's backroads peregrinations in Blue Highways."

The documentary also received praise in the West Seattle Herald, where Bruce Bulloch called Caldwell and Weeks "savvy storytellers" and applauded 10 MPH for being a "witty counterpoint to the hyped-up rhythms of American life." Bulloch further commented of 10 MPH, that despite its slow tempo "[it] has a seductive vitality about it – the last fit of reckless abandon of a disappearing youth." Noting that while the popularity of documentaries has risen in recent years; “They're generally politically charged forays into the troubling issues of our times. ‘10 MPH’ heads off in another direction, taking us, regardless of age, on a sentimental journey to the cusp of adulthood when a sense of adventure was still an important virtue.”

Of a more critical opinion, where The Christian Science Monitor, which commented, "The duo's hook for a movie is to document their gimmicky journey from Seattle to Boston on a Segway scooter. We never truly get inside the heads of these unlikely pioneers but scenic photography and lively side characters make for a diverting trip." On a similar note, Lisa Kennedy of the Denver Post, reflected that "the narration can be a tad earnest. The aesthetic is decidedly DIY. Still, "10 mph," with its wit, beckoning shots of splendid landscapes, and impromptu interviews, might have you humming Woody Guthrie, This land is your land, this land is my land."

In a favorable review in the Boise Weekly, Travis Estvold wrote, "Though piloting a Segway seems a bit gimmicky, it does what the filmmakers probably intended: It attracts plenty of attention. But it also does something that may not have been intentional: The voyage of the battery-powered machine takes a backseat to the personalities of the filmmakers and the characters they meet along the way." In the review Estvold complemented the documentary makers for somehow capturing “every cross section of Americana as they ever-so-slowly wound their way from the home of the Space Needle to the city of Fenway Park.”

In an article on upcoming releases in 2007, the Boston Globe mentioned 10 MPH, calling it an "amusingly offbeat documentary." In the Idaho Statesman, Chad Dryden remarked; “10 MPH succeeds on many levels. For one, it’s a terrific American travelogue, taking the viewer through small-town charm, purple mountain majesty and the big city’s vibrating pulse. More importantly, it’s an inspiring story about cutting through the stagnancy of 21st-century life to follow your dreams.”

Calling the documentary “Charming and maddening”, Jordan Harper raised concerns with the main concepts of 10 MPH, writing in the Dallas Observer, “...for good and ill: The American dream has been determined, and that dream is to become famous not for talent or beauty, but simply for doing something peculiar; if you can't be the American Idol, be one of those jackasses from the auditions. The guys seem nice enough, and there are plenty of sweet slices of Americana, so you might find yourself torn. It's hard not to be drawn in by the film's good-natured vibe, but there's no getting around the urge to smack these guys and tell them to make their next movie about anything except themselves.”

== Artwork and soundtrack ==
10 MPH features artwork by the director's sister, Gannon Weeks, who also appeared in the film and performed public relations, logistics, and other duties. The soundtrack features artists such as Brett Dennen, Roman Candle and Daphne Loves Derby.
