= Tennessee State Route 290 =

State highway in Tennessee, United States

State Route 290
- SR 290 highlighted in red

Route information
- Maintained by TDOT
- Length: 19.7 mi (31.7 km)
- Existed: July 1, 1983–present

Major junctions
- West end: SR 53 northeast of Granville
- SR 56 in Bloomington Springs
- East end: SR 135 in Cookeville

Location
- Country: United States
- State: Tennessee
- Counties: Jackson, Putnam

Highway system
- Tennessee State Routes; Interstate; US; State
| ← SR 289 | → SR 291 |

State Route 290 (SR 290) is a 19.7-mile-long (31.7 km) state highway in Jackson and Putnam counties in the U.S. state of Tennessee. It connects SR 53 northeast of Granville to SR 135 in Cookeville via SR 56 and Bloomington Springs.

== Route description ==
SR 290 begins in Jackson County at an intersection on SR 53 northeast of Granville and southwest of Gainesboro. SR 290 then travels southeast through rural and mountainous terrain for the next several miles, where it is very curvy and passes through Nameless, before having a 1.2-mile-long (1.9 km) concurrency with SR 56 in Bloomington Springs. SR 290 travels to the north with SR 56 and then splits off to the southeast to pass through farmland and have an intersection with SR 477 before crossing into Putnam County.

The highway continues in a southeasterly direction to pass through farmland and rural areas until it reaches the Cookeville city limits. Upon entering Cookeville, SR 290 turns east and becomes an undivided, four-lane road and passes through residential and suburban areas until it meets its eastern terminus, an intersection with SR 135, just north of downtown and the Tennessee Technological University (Tennessee Tech or TTU) campus.

Excluding the portion in Cookeville, the entire route of SR 290 is a two-lane highway.

== Major intersections ==
| County | Location | mi | km | Destinations | Notes |
|---|---|---|---|---|---|
| Jackson | | 0.0 | 0.0 | SR 53 (Granville Highway) – Gainesboro, Granville | Western terminus |
| Jackson | Bloomington Springs | 10.3 | 16.6 | SR 56 south (Grundy Quarles Highway) – Baxter | Western end of SR 56 concurrency |
| Jackson | Bloomington Springs | 11.5 | 18.5 | SR 56 north (Grundy Quarles Highway) – Gainesboro | Eastern end of SR 56 concurrency |
| Jackson | Bloomington Springs | 12.4 | 20.0 | SR 477 east (Cummins Mill Road) – Cummins Falls State Park | Western terminus of SR 477 |
| Putnam | Cookeville | 19.7 | 31.7 | SR 135 (North Willow Avenue) | Eastern terminus |
1.000 mi = 1.609 km; 1.000 km = 0.621 mi: Concurrency terminus
