= Thomas H. Butler =

American politician (1819–1889)

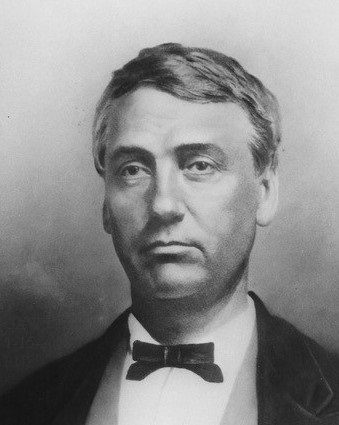
- 1870 portrait of Butler

Secretary of State of Tennessee
- In office 1870–1873
- Governor: Dewitt Clinton Senter; John C. Brown
- Preceded by: A. J. Fletcher
- Succeeded by: Charles N. Gibbs

Member of the Tennessee Senate from the 9th district
- In office 1875–1876
- Preceded by: Newton W. McConnell
- Succeeded by: J. A. Trousdale

Personal details
- Born: Thomas Harvey Butler Sr. October 13, 1819 Butler's Landing, Tennessee, US
- Died: May 20, 1889 (aged 69) Gainesboro, Tennessee, US
- Spouse(s): Mary "Polly" Gore; Sarah Ann Holford
- Children: Mounce Gore Butler

Thomas Harvey Butler Sr. (October 13, 1819 – May 20, 1889) was an American politician, soldier, attorney and engineer.

Listed as T.H. Butler in the official Tennessee Blue Book, Thomas Harvey Butler served as the fifteenth Secretary of State for the State of Tennessee from 1870 to 1873 under Governors Dewitt Clinton Senter and John Calvin Brown. From 1875 to 1876 Butler served as the State Senator for the Ninth District in the Tennessee Senate, a member of the 39th General Assembly or Legislature, representing the Counties of Macon, Clay, Smith, Trousdale, Sumner, and Jackson. Butler also raised a future statesman, his son Mounce Gore Butler, a United States Congressman who represented Tennessee in the U.S. House of Representatives from 1905 to 1907. In 1910, Secretary Butler was posthumously honored by a later Secretary of State, Hallum Goodloe, by hanging Butler's portrait on the walls of Tennessee's State Capitol.

== Soldier ==
Butler enlisted in the 25th Tennessee Infantry of the Confederate States Army on August 10, 1861, at age 35 in Livingston, Tennessee. Butler was appointed by Gov. Isham Harris to the Commissary Office as a Captain of the 25th Tennessee under Colonel Sidney S. Stanton on September 27, 1861 and was honorably discharged by Gen. George G. Dibrell on March 7, 1862. In his post-military career Captain Butler was known as Colonel Butler, a title of respect given to older Southern gentlemen to honor them for exemplary community leadership or government statesmanship.

== Attorney ==
Butler practiced law as an attorney based in Gainesboro, Tennessee, as did his son Bowen Butler who also practiced law in Nashville, Tennessee, both of whom are mentioned in Bowen's prestigious biography entry in the book Tennessee, the Volunteer State 1769-1923 which describes the elder Butler as "an able attorney and one of the foremost men in public affairs of Tennessee. For sixteen years he was retained in the office of Circuit Court Clerk of Jackson County, after which he was made County Clerk, ... later he was appointed United States commissioner". Butler's impressive service as U.S. Commissioner for the Federal Judiciary spanned approximately a decade from 1877 to 1887. A man of many titles, Commissioner Butler also may have been known as Judge Butler when he served as a Justice of the Peace. Two other sons and a son-in-law of Butler were prominent lawyers as well, W. Bailey Butler, General Mounce Gore Butler, and General George H. Morgan. Generals Butler and Morgan both served as Attorneys General for Tennessee's 5th Judicial Circuit.

== Engineer ==
Butler's work in the field of civil engineering involved road and highway construction, bridge building, and land surveying. In March 1854, "An Act to incorporate the Lafayette, Rome, and Lebanon Turnpike Company" by the Tennessee 30th General Assembly was passed into law in which Butler was named among "a body politic and corporate to open books and receive stock for the purpose of constructing the Jennings and Line creeks turnpike road [State Route 56] from Gainsboro' by the nearest and most direct route to the Kentucky State line, in the direction of Tompkinsville, Kentucky" and "to bridge Line and Jennings creeks on the line of said road". Years later in March 1860, "An Act to charter the Granville and Martin's Creek Turnpike Company" by the Tennessee 33rd General Assembly was passed into law which appointed Butler as a Commissioner for the purpose of locating the route upon which the Gainesboro and Defeated Creek Turnpike (State Route 53) would best be built, "to survey the two routes from Gainsboro', by the way of Flynn's Lick, to ... Smith county". In 1870 working with fellow surveyor William Gore, Butler was instrumental in helping establish a new county in Tennessee, namely Clay County. Butler's engineering skills would eventually aide him in his turnpike and railroad-oversight roles as ex-officio Internal Improvement Commissioner and as a Commissioner of Railroads while serving as Secretary of State.

== Family ==
Butler's first wife was Mary "Polly" Gore (1822–1851), a distant relative of U.S. Vice-President Al Gore. According to Susan Butler's family Bible, Thomas and Mary were married July 2, 1844, and "their issue are Mary Ann, William Bailey, Mounce Gore and Sarah Ellenor".

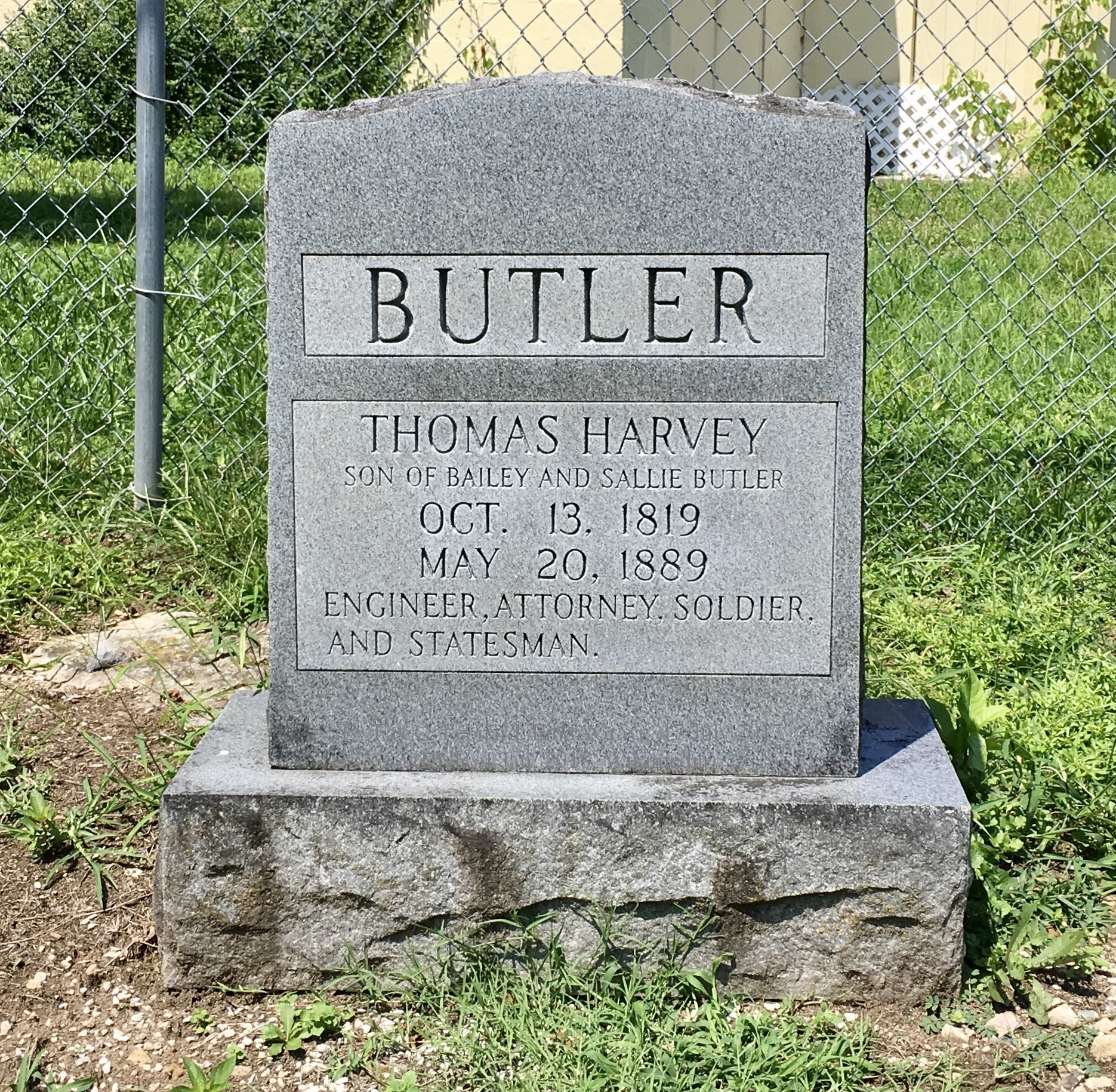
Thomas H. Butler Grave Monument (Photo by Fay C. Leonard, 2017)

Butler's second wife was Sarah Ann Holford (1834–1900), and they "were married 14 April 1853 and their issue are Lizzie Loucetta, John Franklin, Bowen Butler, George Grundy, Martha Jane, Dixie, Rosa Lee, Thomas Harvey, and James Wash, Sam Stone".

Butler was born in Clay County (then Jackson County), Tennessee, the son of Colonel Bailey Butler (1779–1842) and Sarah "Sally" Scanland (1789–1828). On July 4, 2003, the Tennessee Historical Commission dedicated an official historical marker in their hometown of Butler's Landing which the Butlers founded. Butler's pioneer father and their family are honored on one side of the marker, while Butler's Landing and Daniel Boone are honored on the other side of the same marker. Butler died in Gainesboro, Jackson County, Tennessee and is buried there in Gainesboro Cemetery.

Political offices
Preceded by A. J. Fletcher	Secretary of State of Tennessee; 1873–1881	Succeeded by Charles N. Gibbs
