= Spring Creek (Roaring River tributary) =

Coordinates: 36°20′28″N 85°31′44″W

Spring Creek is a large stream in the U.S. state of Tennessee. It flows through Putnam, Overton and Jackson counties and is a major tributary of the Roaring River. It is part of the State Scenic River system of Tennessee, along with the Roaring River and Blackburn Fork River.

The river can be roughly divided into three sections: a smaller but still big headwaters on the Highland Rim, a huge and moderately turbulent lower part and an even more violent whitewater stream as the middle part descends to the level of the Nashville Basin. The lower part dries up due to limestone-dominated karst topography.
