= Cummins Falls =

Waterfall in Jackson County, Tennessee, US

Coordinates: 36.249119°N 85.570707°W

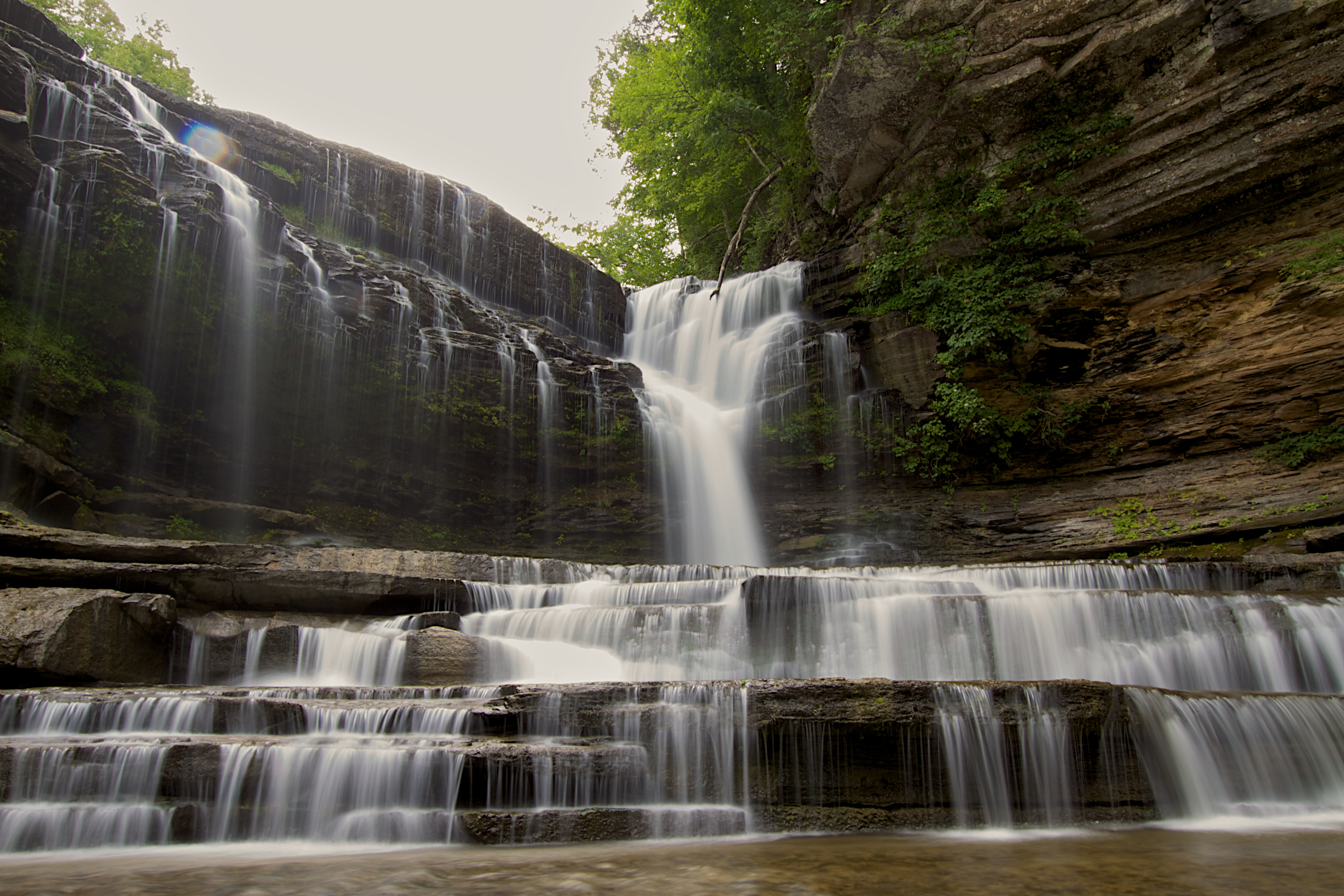
Cummins Falls

Cummins Falls is a waterfall on the Blackburn Fork River and is located in southern Jackson County, Tennessee. By volume, it is the eighth largest waterfall in Tennessee. The falls, with a total height of seventy-five feet, consist of two drops. The first has a plunge drop of fifty feet, ending in a shallow pool. The second has a cascade drop of twenty-five feet into a larger, deeper pool, or "swimming hole". In 2010, Cummins Falls was named "Tenth Best Swimming Hole in America" by Travel + Leisure magazine.

The falls, on land owned continuously by the Cummins family since 1825, was purchased by the Tennessee Parks and Greenways Foundation and designated a public park in 2011.

Tennessee State Parks, a division of the Tennessee Department of Environment and Conservation, manages Cummins Falls State Park and access to the waterfall. While the park is free to enter and the waterfall is visible from an overlook, access to the base of the waterfall is restricted to holders of a Gorge Access Permit.
