= Cookeville micropolitan area =

Cookeville, TN Micropolitan Statistical Area
- Micropolitan Statistical Area
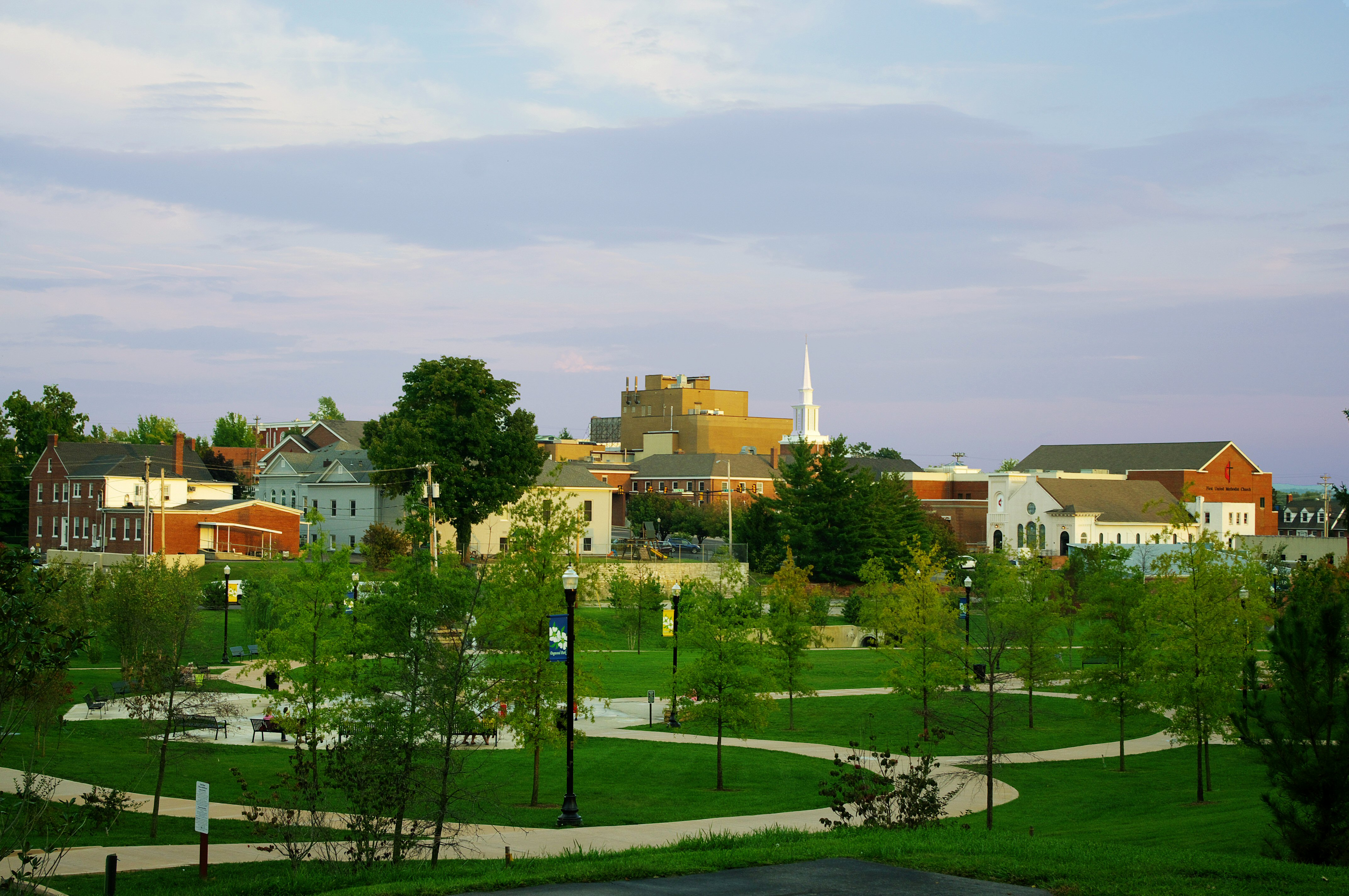
- Cookeville Skyline
Interactive Map of Cookeville, TN μSA
City of Cookeville
Cookeville, TN μSA
- Country: United States
- State: Tennessee
- Principal city: Cookeville
- Other cities: Algood; Livingston

Population (2023 est.)
  - Total: 148,226 (7th)
- Time zone: UTC−6 (CST)
  - Summer (DST): UTC−5 (CDT)
- Area code: 931
- Website: uppercumberland.org

The Cookeville Micropolitan Statistical Area as defined by the United States Census Bureau, is an area consisting of four counties in Middle Tennessee, anchored by the city of Cookeville.

As of the 2020 census, the Cookeville Micropolitan Area had a population of 141,333.

== Counties ==
- Jackson
- Overton
- Putnam
- White

== Communities ==
=== Places with more than 30,000 inhabitants ===
- Cookeville (Principal city)

=== Places with 1,000 to 10,000 inhabitants ===
- Algood
- Baxter
- Dodson Branch
- Livingston
- Monterey
- Sparta

=== Places with fewer than 1,000 inhabitants ===
- Gainesboro, Tennessee
- Doyle, Tennessee

== Demographics ==
At the census of 2000, there were 93,417 people, 37,441 households, and 25,469 families residing within the Cookeville Micropolitan Area. The racial makeup of the Cookeville Micropolitan Area was 95.88% White, 1.22% African American, 0.24% Native American, 0.65% Asian, 0.07% Pacific Islander, 1.13% from other races, and 0.81% from two or more races. Hispanic or Latino of any race were 5.27% of the population.

The median income for a household in the Cookeville Micropolitan Area was $28,110, and the median income for a family was $34,599. Males had a median income of $26,430 versus $20,062 for females. The per capita income for the Cookeville Micropolitan Area was $15,286.

== See also ==
- Tennessee census statistical areas
