= Mayfield, Tennessee =

Unincorporated community in Jackson County, Tennessee, United States

Mayfield is a place in southeastern Jackson County, Tennessee, United States. It is situated along the junction of S.R. 56 and S.R. 290.

Mayfield is recorded by the Geographic Names Information System as "historical". Its coordinates are 36.2453574°N 85.6148673°W.
