= Mounce G. Butler =

American politician (1849–1917)

Mounce Gore Butler
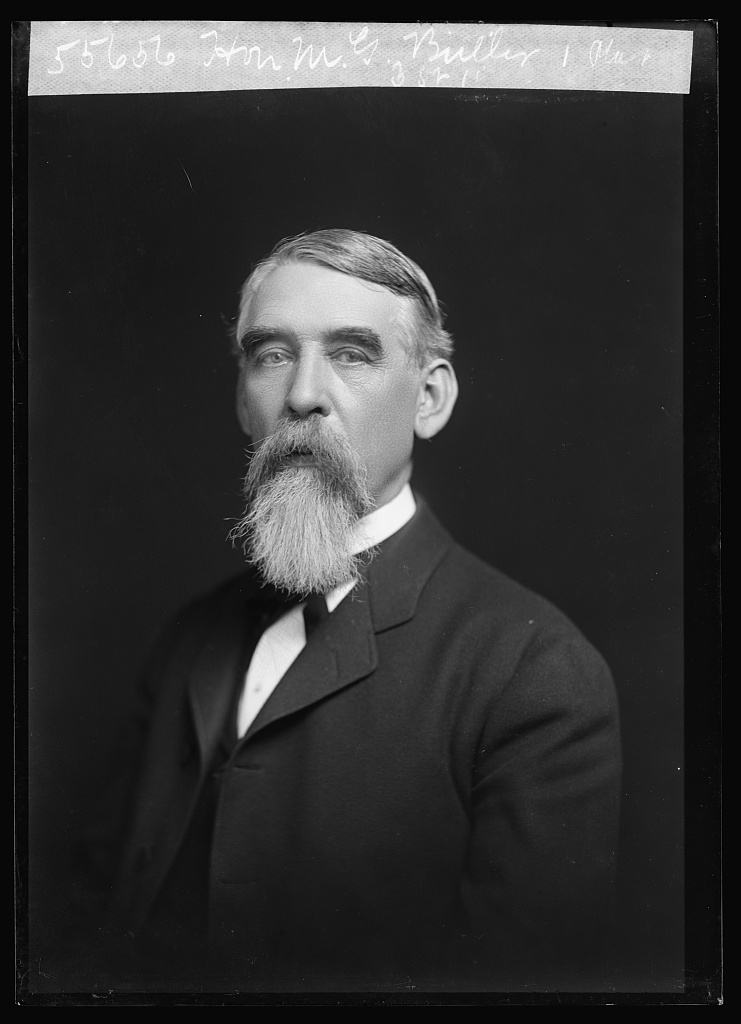

Member of the U.S. House of Representatives from Tennessee's 4th district
- In office March 4, 1905 – March 3, 1907
- Preceded by: Morgan C. Fitzpatrick
- Succeeded by: Cordell Hull

Personal details
- Born: May 11, 1849 Gainesboro, Tennessee
- Died: February 13, 1917 (aged 67) Gainesboro, Tennessee
- Citizenship: United States
- Party: Democratic
- Spouse: Nannie DeWitt Butler
- Education: Cumberland University
- Profession: Attorney, politician, judge

Mounce Gore Butler (May 11, 1849 – February 13, 1917) was an American politician and a member of the United States House of Representatives for the 4th congressional district of Tennessee.

== Biography ==
Butler was born on May 11, 1849, in Gainesboro, Tennessee, in Jackson County, the son of Tennessee's 15th Secretary of State, Thomas H. Butler. Mounce Gore Butler attended the common schools, Old Philomath Academy, and the law department of Cumberland University in Lebanon, Tennessee. He was admitted to the bar in 1871 and commenced practice in the area of Gainesboro.

== Career ==
Butler was a delegate to all Democratic state conventions from 1872 to 1916. From 1894 to 1902, he was the attorney general for the fifth judicial circuit of Tennessee.

Elected as a Democrat to the Fifty-ninth Congress, Butler was an unsuccessful candidate for renomination in 1906. He served from March 4, 1905, to March 3, 1907. He resumed the practice of his profession in Gainesboro, Tennessee in Jackson County.

== Death ==
Butler died in Gainsboro on February 13, 1917. He is interred in Gainesboro Cemetery.

U.S. House of Representatives
Preceded by Morgan C. Fitzpatrick	Member of the U.S. House of Representatives from Tennessee's 4th congressional district March 4, 1905 – March 3, 1907	Succeeded by Cordell Hull
