= Whitleyville, Tennessee =

- Unincorporated community
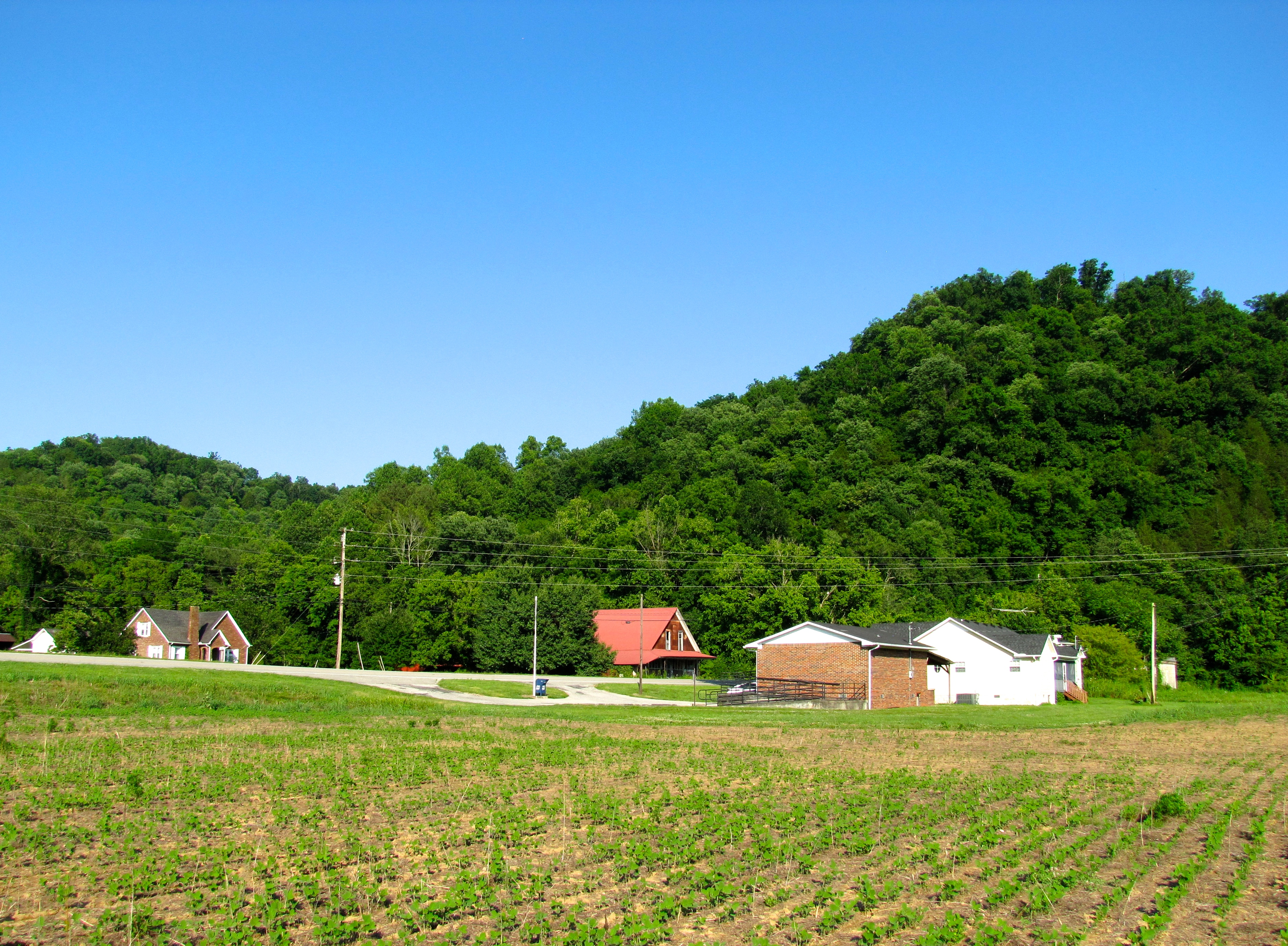
- Buildings along SR 56 in Whitleyville

- Location within Tennessee Location within the United States
- Coordinates: 36°26′43″N 85°40′19″W
- Country: United States
- State: Tennessee
- County: Jackson
- Elevation: 531 ft (162 m)
- Time zone: UTC-6 (Central (CST))
  - Summer (DST): UTC-5 (CDT)
- ZIP code: 38588
- Area code: 931
- GNIS feature ID: 1274422

Whitleyville is an unincorporated rural village in Jackson County, Tennessee, United States. Whitleyville is located on Jennings Creek, a tributary of the Cumberland River, and is concentrated along State Routes 56 and 135 6.2 miles (10.0 km) north of Gainesboro. Whitleyville has a small bank branch office, and a post office serving ZIP code 38588, as well as several scattered residences separated by farm fields and open grassland.
