= Nameless, Tennessee =

- Unincorporated community
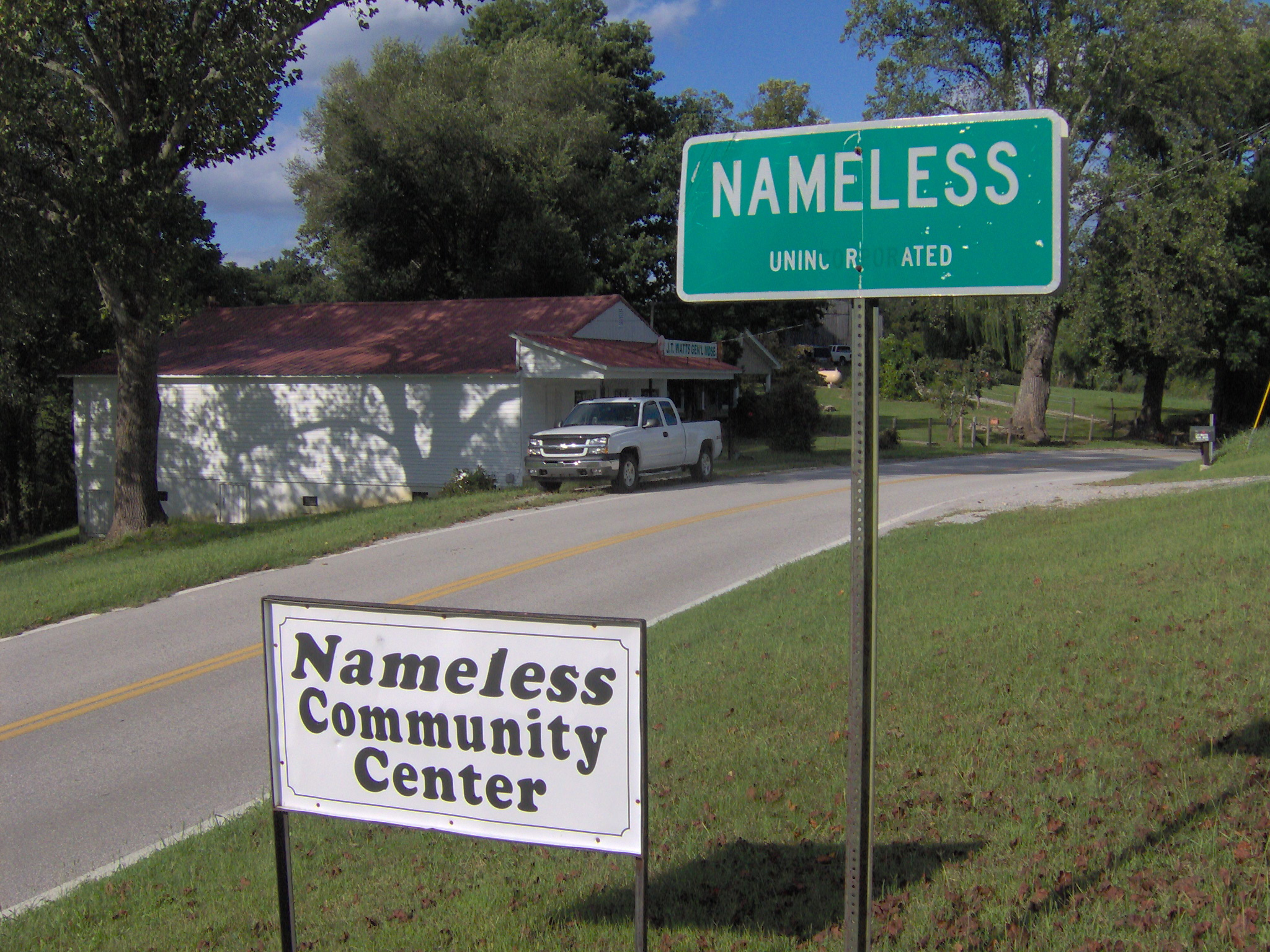
- Nameless, Tennessee

- Location within Tennessee Location within the United States
- Coordinates: 36°15′16″N 85°42′40″W
- Country: United States
- State: Tennessee
- County: Jackson
- Time zone: UTC-6 (Central (CST))
  - Summer (DST): UTC-5 (CDT)
- GNIS feature ID: 1295209

Nameless is an unincorporated community in Jackson County, Tennessee, United States.

== History ==
The community's unusual name has attracted attention from writers. There is no agreement on its origin. One version of the name's origin holds that when residents applied for a post office, the place for a name on the application was left blank, and the U.S. Post Office Department returned the application with "Nameless" stamped on the form. In the 1982 book Blue Highways: A Journey Into America, William Least Heat-Moon reported a variant explanation in which the residents themselves decided that the community should be "nameless" after one of them said "This here’s a nameless place if I ever seen one, so leave it be." Another variation of the story was provided in a 1933 article in the Jackson County Sentinel newspaper, which said that a local official had initially sought to name the post office "Morgan" for county attorney general George Morgan, but the Post Office Department had rejected that name, possibly because the name "Morgan" was still associated in people's minds with the Confederacy, including Confederate Army General John Hunt Morgan. According to this version, after his first choice was rejected the official wrote to federal authorities that if his original request could not be used, he preferred for the post office to be nameless. The Nameless post office was established in 1866 and operated until 1909.

Nameless had about 250 people at its peak. Nameless School operated until 1965. It housed "primer" through grade 4 in one room and grades 5 through 8 in its other room. The former J.T. Watts General Merchandise Store is now operated as a museum.

The community holds Nameless Heritage Day each summer to celebrate ordinary rural life. There are Nameless T-shirts, giveaways from the Nameless Fire Department, and bake sales for veterans of Nameless. Crowds of visitors can buy RC Cola, Moon Pies, and boloney and cheese sandwiches from the old general store. One year, the president of the Nameless Community Center described moving with her husband from New York City to Nameless in the 1970s "to get away from the rat race" and were specifically drawn because of the name.

== In popular culture ==
Nameless is mentioned in the Elvis Costello song "My Dark Life" (on the album Extreme Honey) together with two other places with unusual names, Ugly, Texas, and Peculiar, Missouri.

"Nameless, TN" is the eleventh track on the 2023 Old Crow Medicine Show album, Jubilee.

== See also ==
- No Name, Colorado
- No Name Key, Florida
- Unusual place names
