= Spirit of place =

Unique, distinctive and cherished aspects of a place

Spirit of place (or soul) refers to the unique, distinctive and cherished aspects of a place; often those celebrated by artists and writers, but also those cherished in folk tales, festivals and celebrations. It is thus as much in the invisible weave of culture (stories, art, memories, beliefs, histories, etc.) as it is the tangible physical aspects of a place (monuments, boundaries, rivers, woods, architectural style, rural crafts styles, pathways, views, and so on) or its interpersonal aspects (the presence of relatives, friends and kindred spirits, and the like).

Often the term is applied to a rural or a relatively unspoiled or regenerated place — whereas the very similar term sense of place would tend to be more domestic, urban, or suburban in tone. For instance, one could logically apply 'sense of place' to an urban high street; noting the architecture, the width of the roads and pavements, the plantings, the style of the shop-fronts, the street furniture, and so on, but one could not really talk about the 'spirit of place' of such an essentially urban and commercial environment. However, an urban area that looks faceless or neglected to an adult may have deep meaning to children's street culture.

The Roman term for spirit of place was Genius loci, by which it is sometimes still referred. This has often been historically envisaged as a guardian animal or a small supernatural being (puck, fairy, elf, and the like) or a ghost. In the developed world these beliefs have been, for the most part, discarded. A new layer of less-embodied superstition on the subject, however, has arisen around ley lines, feng shui and similar concepts, on the one hand, and urban leftover spaces, such as back alleys or gaps between buildings in some North-American downtown areas, on the other hand.

The western cultural movements of Romanticism and Neo-romanticism are often deeply concerned with creating cultural forms that 're-enchant the land', in order to establish or re-establish a spirit of place.

Modern earth art (sometimes called environment art) artists such as Andy Goldsworthy have explored the contribution of natural/ephemeral sculpture to spirit of place.

Many indigenous and tribal cultures around the world are deeply concerned with spirits of place in their landscape. Spirits of place are explicitly recognized by some of the world's main religions: Shinto has its Kami which may incorporate spirits of place; and the Dvarapalas and Lokapalas in Hinduism, Vajrayana and Bonpo traditions.

== See also ==
- Bioregionalism
- Common Ground (United Kingdom)
- Cultural landscape
- Cultural region
- Deep map
- Genius loci
- Landvættir
- Nature writing
- Parochialism
- Psychogeography
- Topophilia
