= Deep map =

Type of map with greater information

A deep map is a map with greater information than a two-dimensional image of places, names, and topography.

Some call the approach "vertical travel writing", while archaeologist Michael Shanks compares it to the eclectic approaches of 18th- and early-19th-century antiquarian topographers or to the psychogeographic excursions of the early Situationist International.

As used in the field of geographical information systems, deep maps have more kinds of information than 2D images with labels. They may have 3D information, census information, health or immigrant or education information; information on particular buildings, museum artifacts and where they are from, and the overall demographics of cities. They can link places to documents about their history. They can help support subjective descriptions, and narratives and as a storytelling approach they can help make complex and large-scale technical information legible and meaningful for local communities.

== Key references ==
- Heat-Moon, W. L. (2014). PrairyErth: a deep map. Houghton Mifflin Company.
- Yuan, M., Warf, B., Toyosawa, N., Rayson, P., McIntosh, J., Martin, W. M., ... & Bodenhamer, D. J. (2015). Deep maps and spatial narratives. Indiana University Press.

== See also ==
- Cultural region
- Spirit of place
- Geographic Information Systems
- Counter-mapping
