= Tennessee State Route 289 =

Road in Sparta, Tennessee

State Route 289
- North Spring Street
- SR 289 highlighted in red

Route information
- Maintained by TDOT
- Length: 2.63 mi (4.23 km)
- Existed: July 1, 1983–present

Major junctions
- South end: US 70 in Sparta
- SR 135 in Sparta
- North end: SR 111 in Sparta

Location
- Country: United States
- State: Tennessee
- Counties: White

Highway system
- Tennessee State Routes; Interstate; US; State
← SR 288	→ SR 290

State Route 289 (SR 289), also known as North Spring Street, is a short 2.63-mile-long (4.23 km) north-south state highway located entirely in the city of Sparta, Tennessee.

== Route description ==
SR 289 begins at an intersection with US 70/SR 1 (West Bockman Way) in a business district just across the Calfkiller River from downtown. It heads north north through some neighborhoods before passing through some industrial areas, where it has an intersection Sewell Drive, which provides access to Saint Thomas Highlands Hospital. SR 289 then has a Y-intersection with SR 135 (Roberts Matthews Highway) just shortly before coming to an end at an interchange with SR 111. The entire route SR 289 is a two-lane highway.

== History ==
For its entire length, SR 289 represents the former two-lane alignment of SR 111 prior to the new 4-lane freeway being built.

== Major intersections ==
The entire route is in Sparta, White County.

mi	km	Destinations	Notes
0.00	0.00	US 70 (West Bockman Way/SR 1) – Smithville, Pleasant Hill, Crossville	Southern terminus
1.25	2.01	Sewell Drive - Saint Thomas Highlands Hospital	
2.39– 2.48	3.85– 3.99	SR 135 north (Roberts Matthews Highway)	Southern terminus of SR 135
2.63	4.23	SR 111 – Spencer, Cookeville	Northern terminus; road continues north as North Spring Street
1.000 mi = 1.609 km; 1.000 km = 0.621 mi
