= Hunter Weeks =

American filmmaker and producer

Hunter Weeks is an American filmmaker and producer of documentaries. He has directed and produced seven feature-length documentaries including 10 MPH, 10 Yards, Inspired to Ride (about the Trans Am Bike Race), Reveal the Path, Ride the Divide (about the Tour Divide mountain bike race, Where the Yellowstone Goes, and WALTER: Lessons from the Worlds Oldest People. Hunter is also a producer and director of season 1 and 2 the Carbon TV original documentary series, American Harvest.
