= Charles Edward Snodgrass =

American politician (1866–1936)

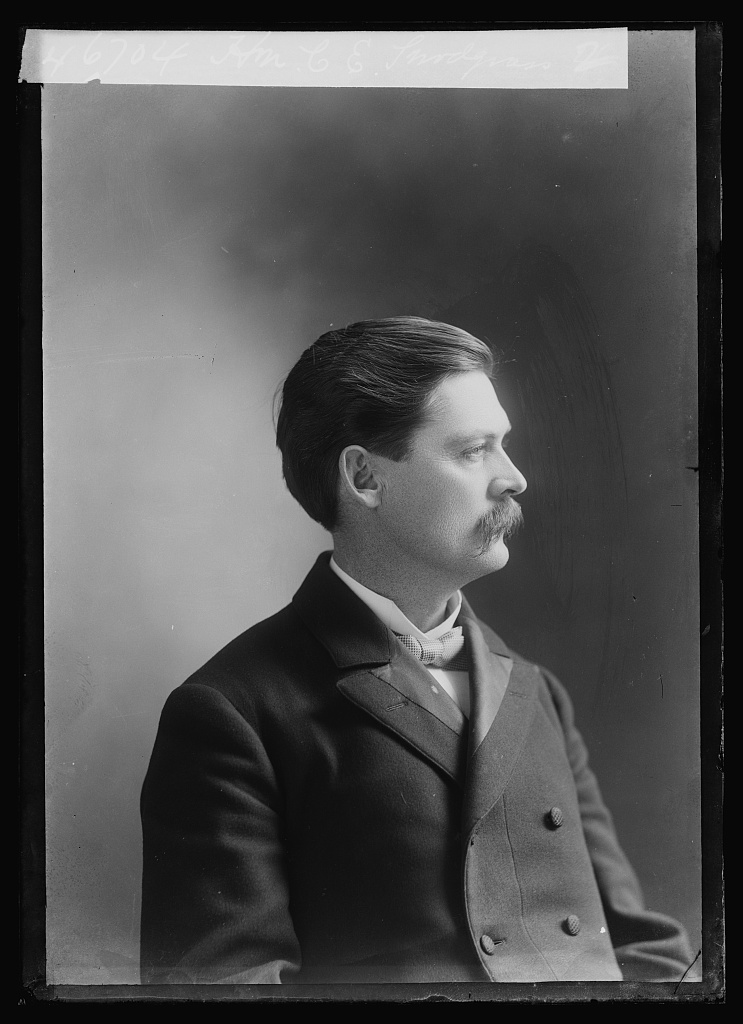

Member of the U.S. House of Representatives from Tennessee's 4th district
- In office March 4, 1899 – March 3, 1903
- Preceded by: Benton McMillin
- Succeeded by: Morgan C. Fitzpatrick

Personal details
- Born: December 28, 1866 White County, Tennessee
- Died: August 9, 1936 (aged 69) Crossville, Tennessee
- Citizenship: United States
- Party: Democratic
- Spouse: Lola Adel Webb Snodgrass
- Children: Nell Vaughn Snodgrass Johnson; Jonas Leslie Snodgrass; Robert Snodgrass; Lola Belle Snodgrass Taylor; Edgar Harvey Snodgrass; Elsie Virginia Snodgrass; Joyce Evans Snodgrass; Polly Robin Snodgrass; Charles Edward Snodgrass
- Profession: Attorney; politician; judge

Charles Edward Snodgrass (December 28, 1866 – August 9, 1936) was an American politician and a member of the United States House of Representatives for the 4th congressional district of Tennessee.

== Biography ==
Snodgrass was born on December 28, 1866, near Sparta, Tennessee, in White County, son of Thomas and Eliza Jane Evans Snodgrass. He attended the common schools, studied law, and was admitted to the bar. He commenced practice in Crossville, Tennessee, in 1888. He married Lola Adel Webb on June 30, 1889, and they had nine children.

== Career ==
Elected as a Democrat to the Fifty-sixth and Fifty-seventh Congresses, Snodgrass served from March 4, 1899, to March 3, 1903, and was an unsuccessful candidate for re-election in 1902.

Snodgrass as a Court of Appeals judge

Snodgrass was a judge of the fifth judicial circuit of Tennessee. He was appointed and subsequently elected judge of the Court of Appeals upon the reorganization of that court and served from 1925 to 1934 when he retired to private life in Crossville, Tennessee.

== Death ==
On August 9, 1936, Snodgrass died in Crossville at age 69 years, 219 days. He is interred at Crossville City Cemetery. He was the nephew of fellow Tennessee congressman Henry C. Snodgrass, and father-in-law of World War I Medal of Honor recipient Milo Lemert.

The building on the courthouse square in Crossville where Snodgrass and his son practiced law has been renamed in his honor.

U.S. House of Representatives
Preceded by Benton McMillin	Member of the U.S. House of Representatives from Tennessee's 4th congressional district March 4, 1899 – March 3, 1903	Succeeded by Morgan C. Fitzpatrick
