= Morgan C. Fitzpatrick =

American politician (1868–1908)

Morgan Cassius Fitzpatrick
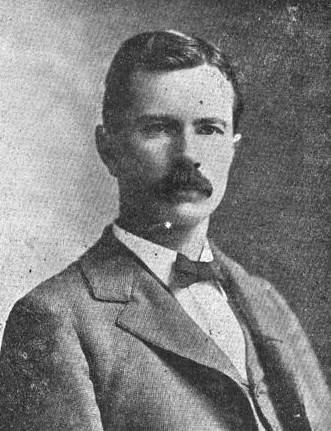
- From Volume V (1899) of the Southwestern School Journal magazine

Member of the U.S. House of Representatives from Tennessee's 4th district
- In office March 4, 1903 – March 3, 1905
- Preceded by: Charles E. Snodgrass
- Succeeded by: Mounce G. Butler

Member of the Tennessee House of Representatives
- In office 1895–1899

Personal details
- Born: October 29, 1868 Smith County
- Died: June 25, 1908 (aged 39) Nashville, Tennessee
- Citizenship: United States
- Party: Democratic
- Spouse: Maggie Mae DeBow Fitzpatrick
- Education: Cumberland University (LL.B.)
- Profession: Attorney; politician; newspaper editor

Morgan Cassius Fitzpatrick (October 29, 1868 – June 25, 1908) was an American attorney and politician who served as a member of the United States House of Representatives for the 4th congressional district of Tennessee.

== Biography ==
Fitzpatrick was born on October 29, 1868, near Carthage, Tennessee, in Smith County. He attended the common schools and Lebanon University, in Warren County, Ohio, in 1887. In 1890, he graduated with an LL.B. degree from the law department of Cumberland University in Lebanon, Tennessee. He was admitted to the bar in 1891 and commenced practice in Hartsville, Tennessee. He also edited a newspaper at Hartsville. In 1894, he married Maggie Mae De Bow. They had one daughter.

== Career ==
A member of the Tennessee House of Representatives, Fitzpatrick served from 1895 to 1899. He served as speaker from 1897 to 1899, having been elected on the first ballot over A.H. Pettibone. In 1898, Fitzpatrick was chairman of the state Democratic executive committee. He was the state superintendent of public instruction for Governor Benton McMillin from 1899 to 1903.

Fitzpatrick was elected as a Democrat to the Fifty-eighth Congress. He served from March 4, 1903, to March 3, 1905, but he was not a candidate for renomination in 1904 and resumed the practice of law in Gallatin, Tennessee.

== Death ==
Fitzpatrick died in Nashville, Tennessee, on June 25, 1908 (age 39 years, 240 days). He is interred at the Gallatin City Cemetery.

U.S. House of Representatives
Preceded by Charles E. Snodgrass	Member of the U.S. House of Representatives from Tennessee's 4th congressional district March 4, 1903 – March 3, 1905	Succeeded by Mounce G. Butler
