= William Least Heat-Moon =

American travel writer and historian (born 1939)

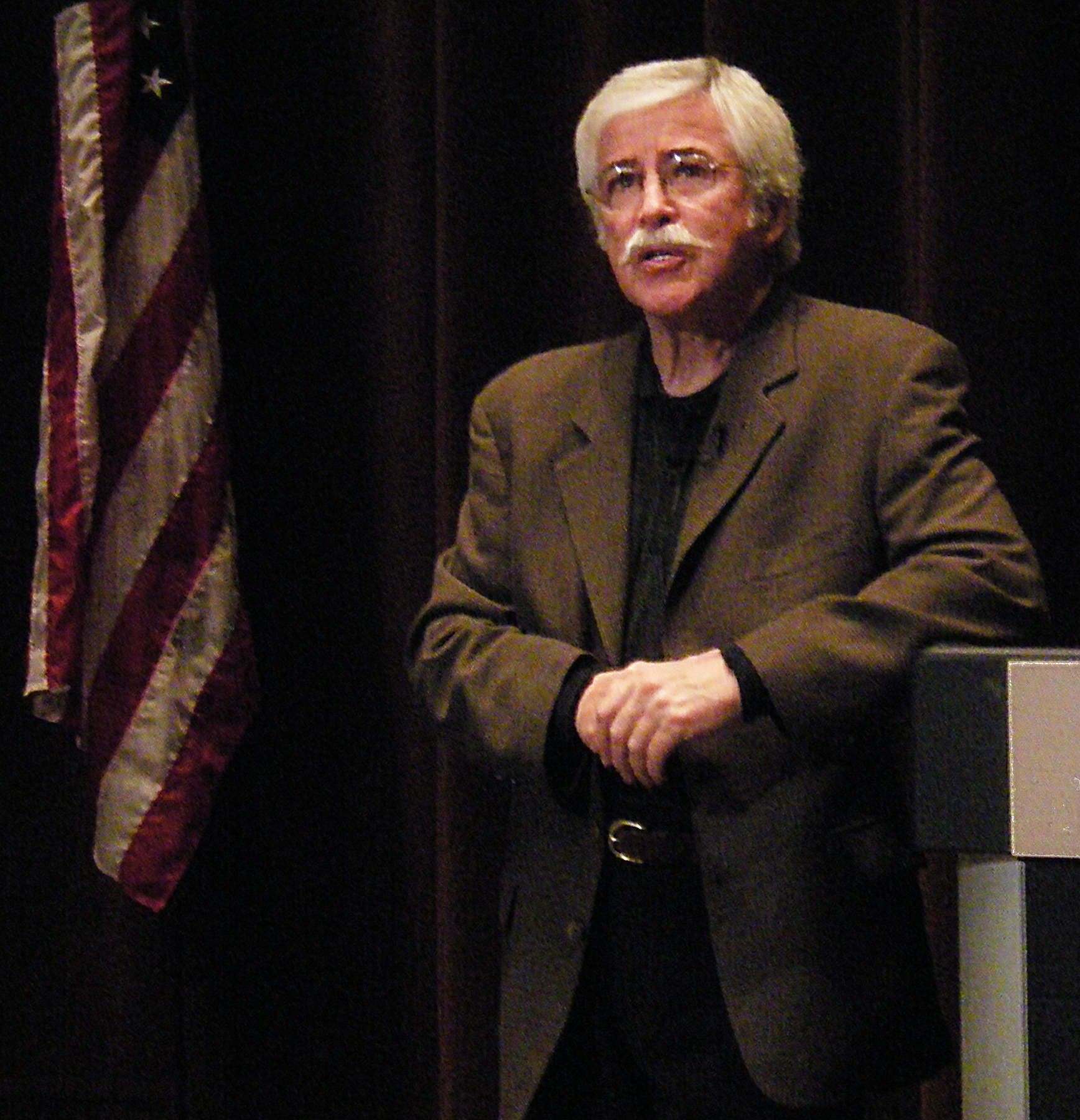
- Least Heat-Moon at the Seattle Public Library (2008)
- Born: William Lewis Trogdon; August 27, 1939 (age 87); Kansas City, Missouri, U.S.
- Education: BA, MA, Ph.D. in English; BJ in photojournalism University of Missouri
- Occupations: Travel writer, historian
- Writing career
- Language: English
- Genres: Deep map, travel literature
- Notable work: Blue Highways

William Least Heat-Moon (born William Lewis Trogdon, August 27, 1939) is an American travel writer and historian. He describes his heritage as English, Irish, and Osage. He is the author of several books which chronicle unusual journeys through the United States, including cross-country trips by boat (River-Horse, 1999) and, in his best known work (1982's Blue Highways), about his journey in a 1975 Ford Econoline van.

== Biography ==
William Trogdon was born in Kansas City, Missouri. William's father, Ralph Grayston Trogdon, was given the name "Chieftain Heat-Moon" by the Tribe of Mic-O-Say, an honor society of Scouting America; he was scoutmaster of a Boy Scout troop from 1936 to 1948. When William's elder half-brother from his mother's previous marriage was inducted into Mic-O-Say, he took the name "Little Heat-Moon" and William, wanting to continue the tradition, took the name "Least Heat-Moon." He cites Osage ancestry as reason for adopting the pen name "Little Heat-Moon" in later life, but none of the family has tribal citizenship and Trogdon does not consider himself "Indian."

Trogdon, the son of an attorney, grew up in Missouri where he attended public schools. He attended the University of Missouri, earning a bachelor's degree in 1961, a masters in 1962, and a PhD in 1972 (all in English). He later went back and completed a bachelor's in photojournalism at MU in 1978. In 2011, he received an honorary degree from MU. Trogdon was a member of the Beta-Theta chapter of Tau Kappa Epsilon. He later served as a professor of English at the university.

Trogdon resides in Boone County near the Missouri River.

== Works ==
Blue Highways (1982) is a chronicle of a three-month-long road trip that Least Heat-Moon took throughout the United States in 1978 after losing his teaching job and separating from his first wife. He tells how he traveled 13,000 miles, as much as possible on secondary roads, and tried to avoid cities. These roads were often drawn on maps in blue in the old-style Rand McNally road atlas, hence the book title. Living out of his van, he visited small towns such as Nameless, Tennessee; Hachita, New Mexico; and Bagley, Minnesota, to find places in America untouched by fast food chains and interstate highways. The book records his search for something greater than himself and includes memorable encounters in roadside cafés. This memoir was very popular, making the New York Times bestseller list in 1982–83 for 42 weeks. It was also the winner of a Christopher Award in 1984.

PrairyErth: A Deep Map (1991) is an account of the history and people of Chase County, Kansas. This work introduced the concept of a deep map.

River-Horse (1999) is Least Heat-Moon's account of a four-month coast-to-coast boat trip across the U.S. in which he traveled almost exclusively on the nation's waterways from the Atlantic to the Pacific. During this nearly 5,000-mile journey, he followed documented routes recorded by early explorers such as Henry Hudson and the Lewis and Clark expedition.

Columbus in the Americas (2002) is a brief history of Christopher Columbus's journeys.

Roads to Quoz (2008) is another "road book." This covers "not one long road trip, but a series of shorter ones" taken over the years between books. Robert Sullivan of the New York Times Book Review commented that Least Heat-Moon celebrates "serendipity and joyous disorder."

Here, There, Elsewhere (2013) is a collection of Least Heat-Moon's best short-form travel writing.

An Osage Journey to Europe 1827-1830 (2013) was translated and edited by Least Heat-Moon and James K Wallace. It is the account of six Osage people who traveled to Europe in 1827, accompanied by three Americans.

Writing 'Blue Highways' (2014) is an account of how Least Heat-Moon wrote his best-selling book Blue Highways. In reflecting on the journey, he also discusses writing, publishing, personal relationships, and many other aspects that went into writing the book. It won an award for Distinguished Literary Achievement, Missouri Humanities Council, 2015.

Celestial Mechanics: A Tale for a Mid-Winter Night (2017) is William Least Heat-Moon's debut novel.

== Themes ==
=== Ecocentrism ===
Least Heat-Moon's works focus very heavily upon the theme of Ecocentrism.

Because his best known work centers on different methods of traversing the North American landscape, one might say that the ecosystem serves as a necessary foundation for Least Heat-Moon's writings. Jonathan Levin, Professor of English at the University of Mary Washington, labels Least Heat-Moon a “literary naturalist." Specifically, he attempts to illustrate a hybrid relationship between humans and the environment and how each entity influences the other. Nature is presented more as an active character in Least Heat-Moon's narratives as opposed to a backdrop.

As a result, Least Heat-Moon calls into question the nature of how society defines its own geographical boundaries. Renee Bryzik, a professor at UC Davis, likens Least Heat-Moon's method of illustrating this socio-environmental interaction to a reinvigorated analysis of Bioregionalism. According to Bryzik, what seems most fascinating to Least Heat-Moon are instances where the line dividing society and nature becomes blurred, and it is difficult to tell whether society has influenced the environment or vice versa.

Least Heat-Moon's writings also present a critique of how societal progress has negatively affected the ecosystem. The insights that Least Heat-Moon gained in his travels along the blue highways were two-fold in that while he was able to come to terms with his own personal growth, he was simultaneously able to contemplate how he as a human being fit into the greater fabric of the universe. In essence, his ability to comment on the state of the ecosystem post-Blue Highways stemmed from his acquired understanding of how humans interact with their physical surrounding, and how they should interact with their environment.

River Horse is particularly effective as a medium for commentary on contemporary environmental resource management as his travels were reliant upon a different kind of blue highway: the rivers of North America.

=== Psychology of self ===
Although Blue Highways is remembered primarily for the physical trek, which covers about 38 of the 50 states in the U.S., the quintessence of the book is the internal journey that Least Heat-Moon takes. The blue highways allowed Least Heat-Moon the space and the freedom to reflect upon who he was, who he wanted to be, and how he fit into the greater world around him. Initiated by the loss of his job and the unraveling of his marriage, his own search for “self” quite literally took him down the road less traveled. Blue Highways has been likened to a cross between John Steinbeck's Travels with Charley, and Jack Kerouac's On the Road.

Apart from Least Heat-Moon's own admission that Travels with Charley partially influenced the decision to travel and write Blue Highways, the literary tones of both books also parallel each other. Both authors were interested in exploring the U.S. as thoughtful and reflective observers. Least Heat-Moon's circumstances mirror those of Kerouac's protagonist as well, and the work shows a spiritual dimension reminiscent of “Beat” culture. He was himself influenced by Beat writers such as Lawrence Ferlinghetti, and admitted to reworking the concept of Kerouac's On the Road.

One aspect of Blue Highways as a travel narrative is that it is a snapshot of American culture that echoes the sentiments of Beat Generation writings and even Romantic Era travelogues, but does so in the late 1970s. His decision to strike out on the open road in search of spiritual truths continued a tradition that captured the cultural outlook of a certain era in U.S. history (the 1950s–1970s). To a certain extent this tradition has been lost.

Although Least Heat-Moon's works echo Transcendentalist spiritual concepts, he has stated that he does not consider himself to be a “Transcendentalist”.

=== Cartography ===
See deep mapping.

== Bibliography ==
External videos
- Presentation by Least-Heat Moon on River-Horse, October 19, 1999, C-SPAN
- Booknotes interview with Least Heat-Moon on River-Horse, January 16, 2000, C-SPAN
- Presentation by Least-Heat Moon on Columbus in the Americas, October 1, 2002, C-SPAN
- Presentation by Least-Heat Moon on Blue Highways, July 12, 2003, C-SPAN
- Presentation by Least-Heat Moon on Roads to Quoz, November 10, 2008, C-SPAN
- Presentation by Least-Heat Moon on Writing "Blue Highways", June 5, 2014, C-SPAN

- Blue Highways: A Journey Into America. Fawcett, 1982. ISBN 0-449-21109-6
- The Red Couch: A Portrait of America. With Kevin Clarke and Horst Wackerbarth. Olympic Marketing Corp, 1984. ISBN 0-912383-05-4
- "A Glass of Handmade." The Atlantic, November 1987.
- PrairyErth (A Deep Map). Houghton Mifflin, 1991. ISBN 0-395-48602-5
- River Horse: The Logbook of a Boat Across America. Houghton Mifflin, 1999. ISBN 0-395-63626-4
- Columbus in the Americas (Turning Points in History). Wiley, 2002. ISBN 0-471-21189-3
- Roads to Quoz: An American Mosey. Little, Brown and Company, October 2008. ISBN 978-0-316-11025-9
- Here, There, Elsewhere: Stories from the Road. Little, Brown and Company, January 8, 2013. ISBN 0316110248
- An Osage Journey to Europe 1827-1830: Three French Accounts. University of Oklahoma Press, October 2013. ISBN 0806144033
- Writing Blue Highways: The Story of How a Book Happened. University of Missouri Press, May 2014. Hardcover, 978-0-8262-2026-4 / E-book, 978-0-8262-7325-3.
- Celestial Mechanics: A Tale for a Mid-Winter Night. Three Rooms Press, April 2017. Hardcover, 978-1-941110-56-0 / E-book, 978-1-941110-57-7.
