= Bloomington Springs, Tennessee =

- Unincorporated community
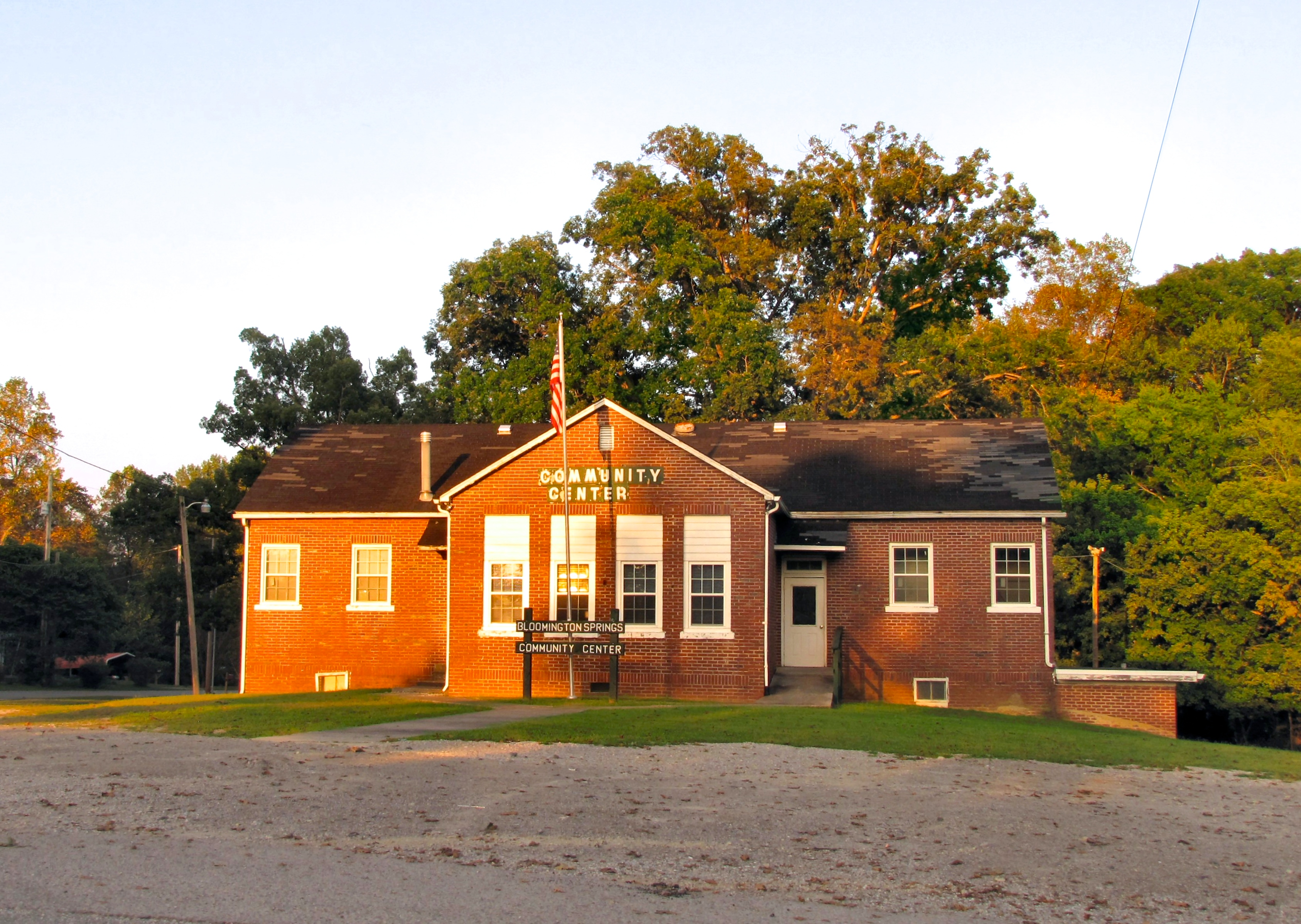
- Bloomington Springs Community Center

- Location within Tennessee Location within the United States
- Coordinates: 36°11′47″N 85°37′13″W
- Country: United States
- State: Tennessee
- County: Putnam
- Elevation: 1,060 ft (320 m)
- Time zone: UTC-6 (Central (CST))
  - Summer (DST): UTC-5 (CDT)
- ZIP code: 38545
- Area code: 931
- GNIS feature ID: 1305296

Bloomington Springs (also Bloomington, Blumington) is an unincorporated community in Putnam County, Tennessee, United States. It has a post office, with ZIP code 38545. It is concentrated around the intersection of Tennessee State Route 56 and Tennessee State Route 291, north of Baxter and west of Cookeville.

== Bloomington Springs Community Center ==
Bloomington Springs Community Center is a building found at 5799 Martin Creek Road Bloomington Springs, TN 38545

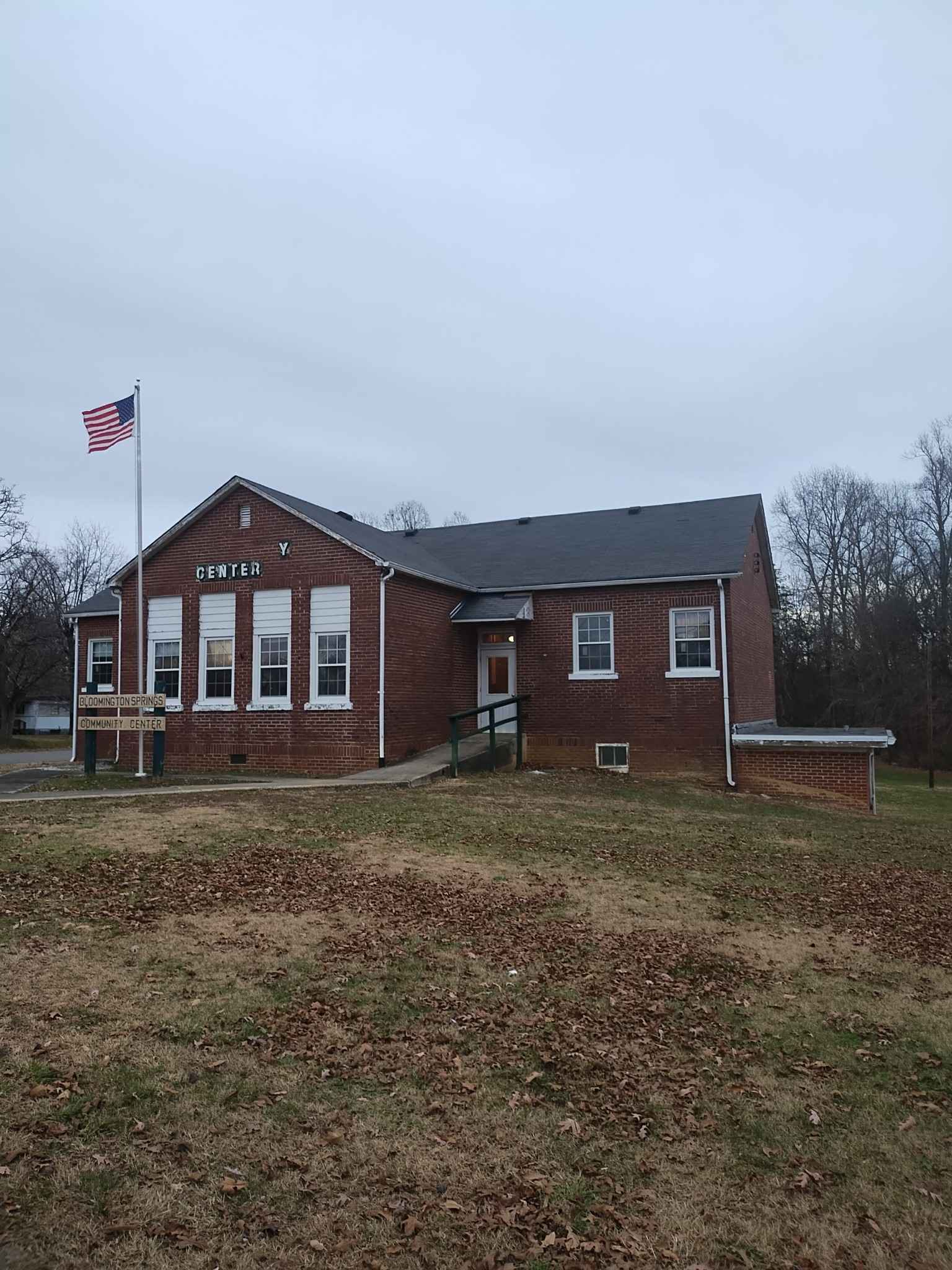
Outside of Center

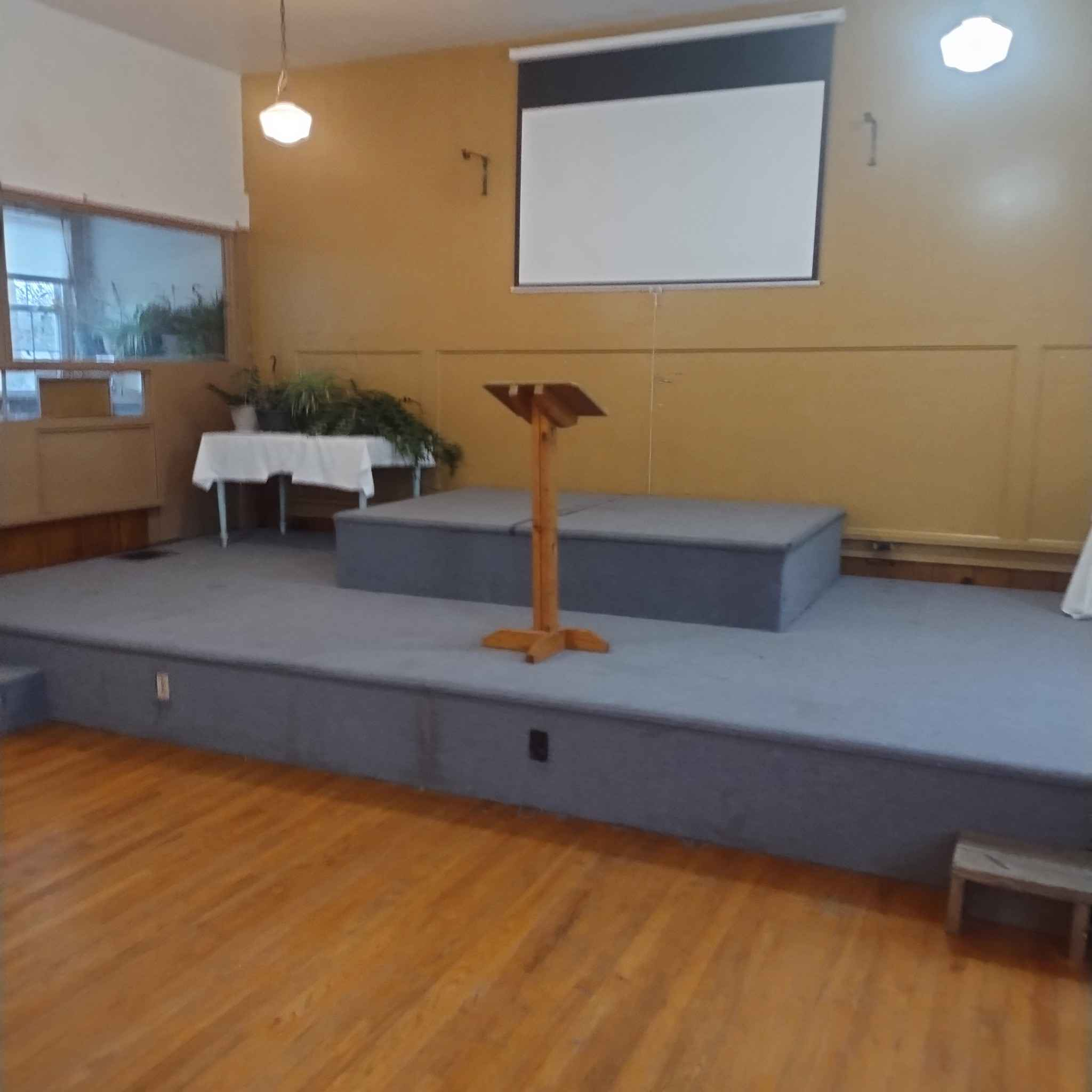
Preaching Area Inside

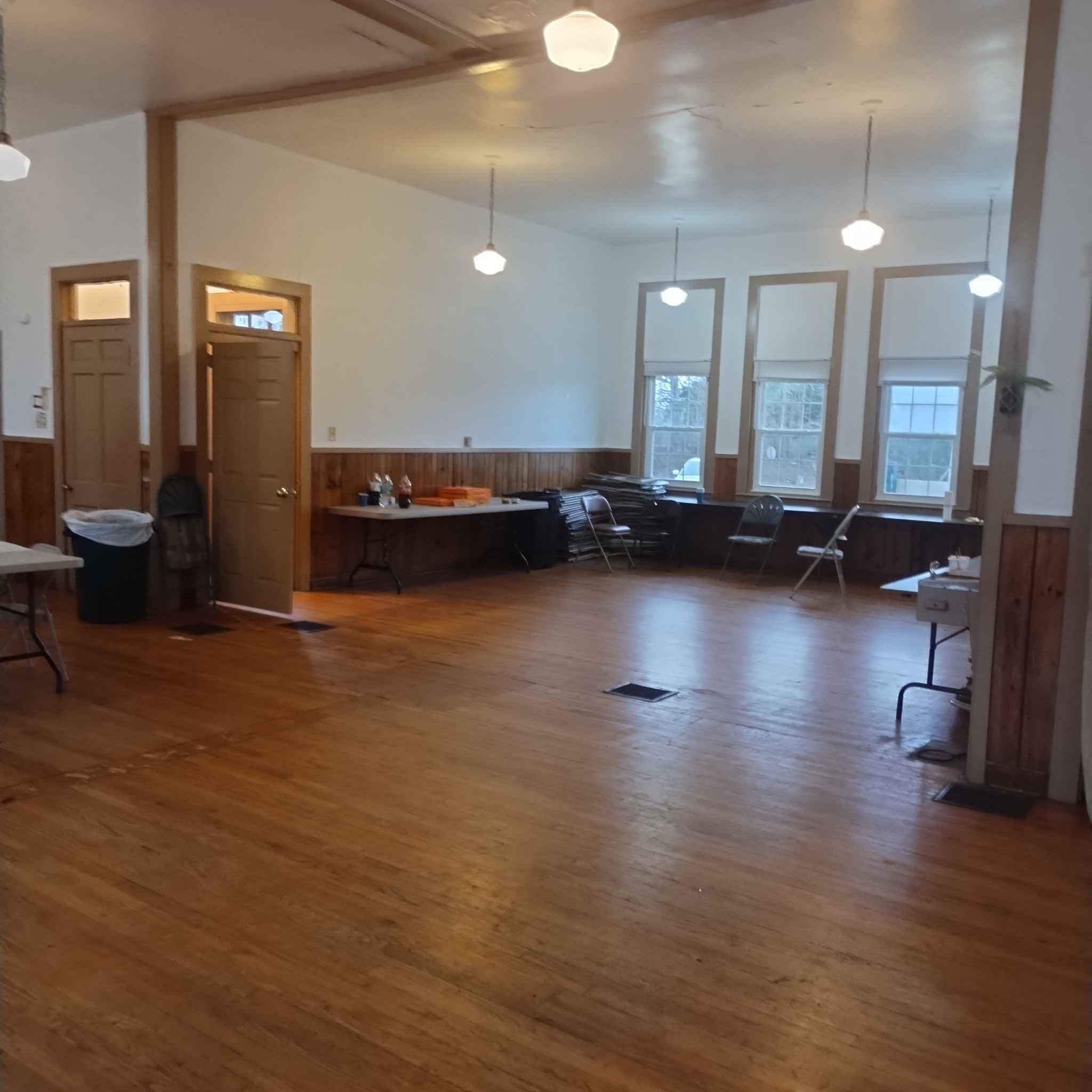
Main Area Inside of Center
