= Blue Highways =

Book by William Least Heat-Moon

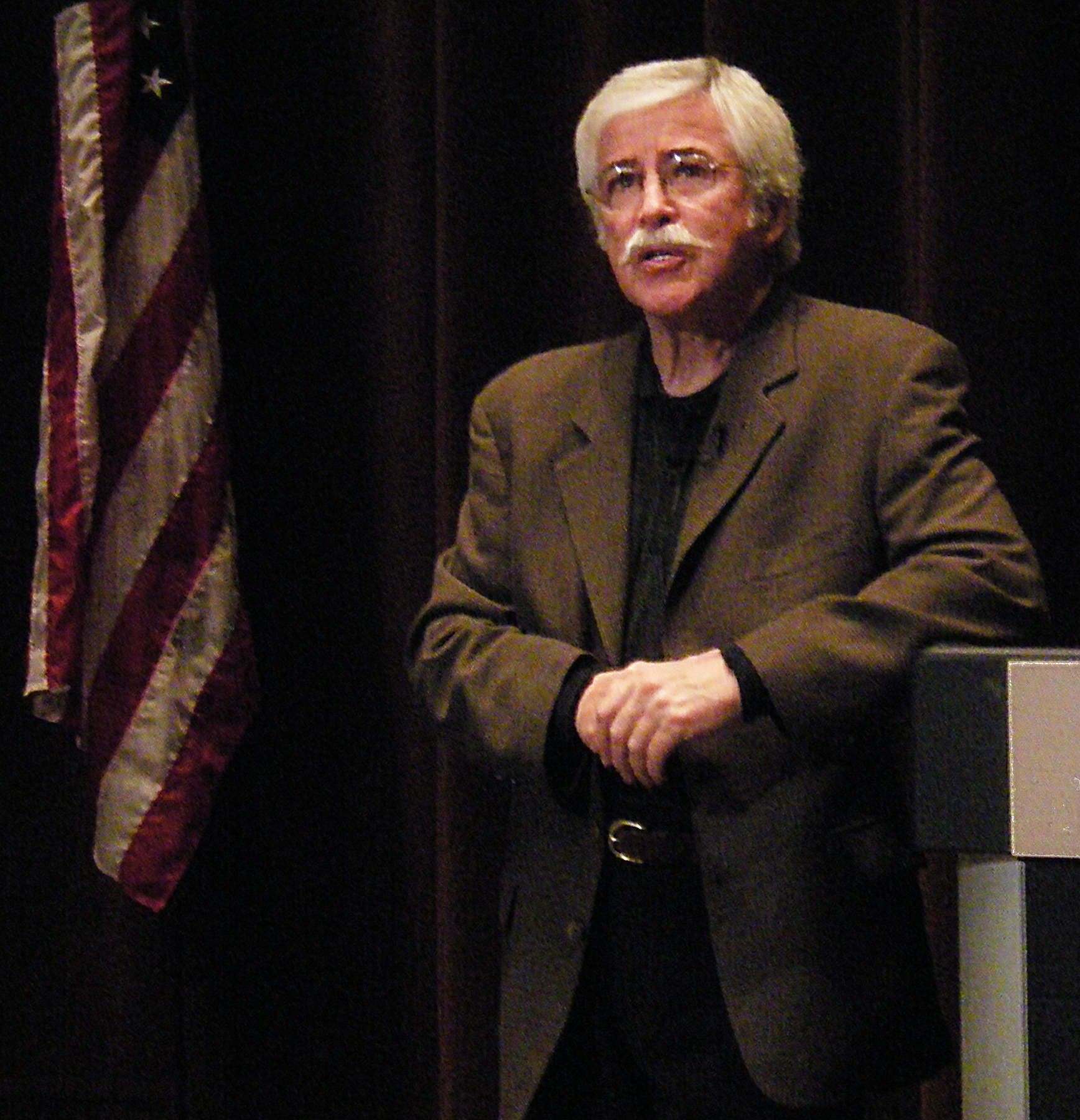
- William Least Heat-Moon (2008)
- Author: William Least Heat-Moon
- Language: English
- Subject: Travel/Biography
- Publisher: Fawcett Crest
- Publication date: 1982
- Publication place: United States
- Pages: 415
- ISBN: 0-449-21109-6
- OCLC: 257104961

Blue Highways is an autobiographical travel book, published in 1982, by William Least Heat-Moon, born William Trogdon.

== Summary ==
In 1978, after separating from his wife and losing his job as a teacher, Heat-Moon, 38 at the time, took an extended road trip in a circular route around the United States, sticking to only the "Blue Highways". He had coined the term to refer to small, forgotten, out-of-the-way roads connecting rural America, which were drawn in blue on the Rand McNally road atlases of the time.

He outfitted his van with a bunk, a camping stove, a portable toilet and a copy of Walt Whitman's Leaves of Grass and John Neihardt's Black Elk Speaks. Referring to the Native American resurrection ritual, he named the van "Ghost Dancing", and embarked on a three-month soul-searching tour of the United States, wandering from small town to small town, stopping often at towns with interesting names. The book chronicles the 13,000-mile journey and the people he meets along the way, as he steers clear of cities and interstates, avoiding fast food and exploring local American culture.

Stories that arose from Least Heat-Moon's research as well as historical facts are included about each area visited, as well as conversations with characters such as a Seventh-day Adventist evangelist hitchhiker, a teenage runaway, a boat builder, a monk, an Appalachian log cabin restorer, a rural Nevada prostitute, fishermen, a Hopi Native American medical student, owners of Western saloons and remote country stores, a maple syrup farmer, and Chesapeake Bay island dwellers.

== Reception ==
Blue Highways was on the New York Times bestseller list for 42 weeks in 1982–83. Robert Penn Warren called the book "a masterpiece," writing that "[Least Heat-Moon] makes America seem new, in a very special way, and its people new."

== Cultural impact ==
- Blue Highways Revisited: Written and photographed by Edgar I. Ailor III, and Edgar I. Ailor IV, Blue Highways Revisited is a 30-year follow-up to Heat-Moon's original book. The Ailors re-travel the routes of Heat-Moon and seek out the sites he visited, as well as the people he interacted with along the way.
- Robert W. Cole Jr. and Midwestern Schools: Influenced by Heat-Moon's Blue Highways, Cole, a then-editor of the Phi Delta Kappan magazine, decided to take leave in order to study rural and small-town schools in the American Mid-West.
- Blue Highways and Forbes: Listed as number nine of fifteen travel books that "will change the way you see the world."
- Four Calendar Cafe: Blue Highways inspired the name of the Cocteau Twins' 1993 album Four-Calendar Café.
