= Cummins Falls State Park =

State park in Tennessee, United States

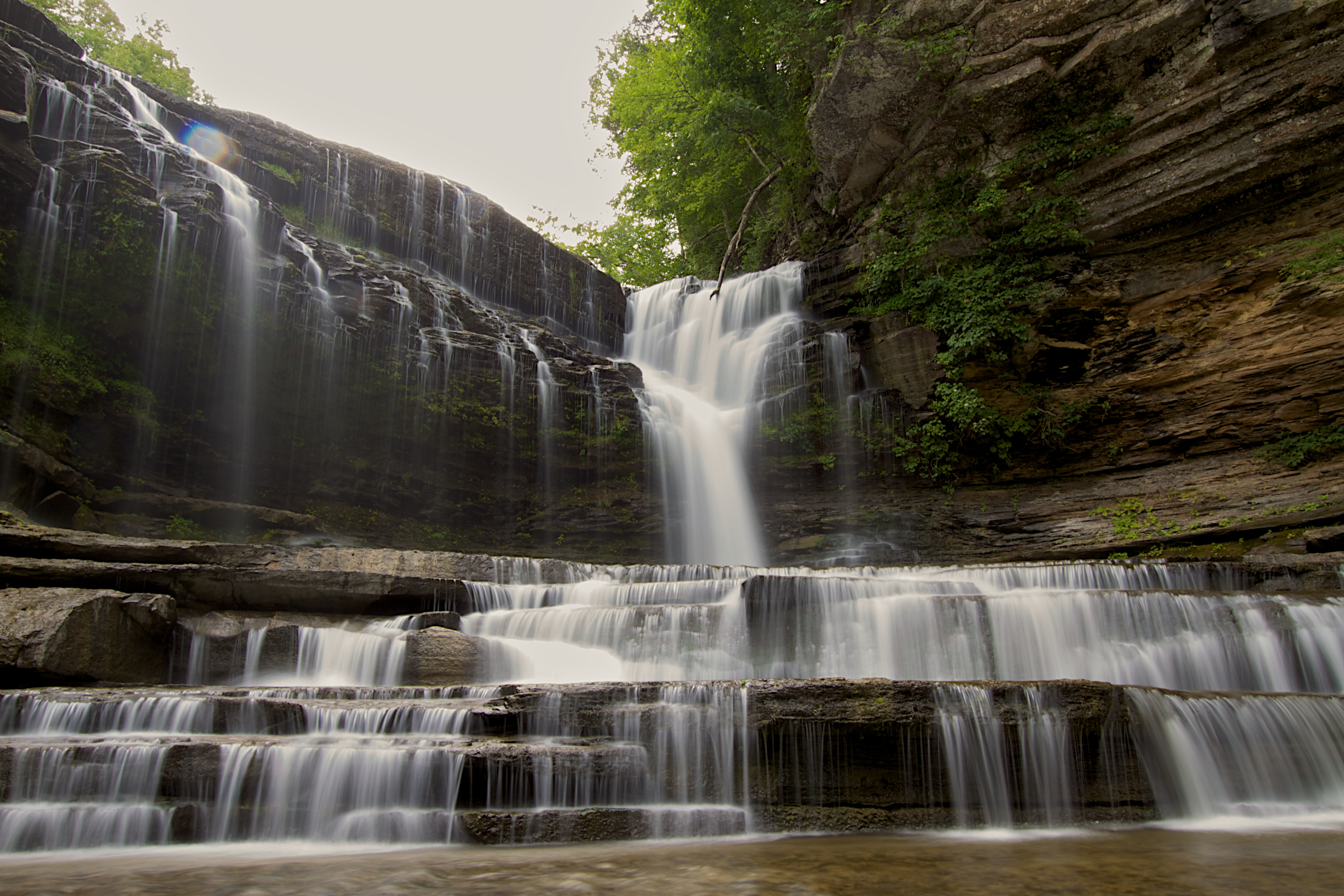
- Cummins Falls
- Interactive map of Cummins Falls State Park
- Type: Tennessee State Park
- Location: Jackson County, Tennessee
- Coordinates: 36°15′13″N 85°33′53″W
- Area: 282 acres (1.14 km^{2})
- Created: 2011
- Operator: Tennessee Parks and Greenways Foundation
- Open: year-round
- Website: Cummins Falls State Park

Cummins Falls State Park is a 282-acre (1.14 km^{2}) state park located northwest of Cookeville in Jackson County in the U.S. state of Tennessee. Its namesake, Cummins Falls, is a 75-foot (23 m) waterfall, which is located on the Blackburn Fork State Scenic River. The park was purchased and created by TennGreen Land Conservancy (formerly the Tennessee Parks and Greenways Foundation) in 2011.

== Activities ==
Picnicking, hiking, and fishing may be done at Cummins Falls State Park.

== See also ==
- Burgess Falls State Park
- Fall Creek Falls State Resort Park
- Ozone Falls State Natural Area
