= Dodson Branch, Tennessee =

- Census-designated place
- Location within Tennessee Location within the United States
- Coordinates: 36°18′45″N 85°31′56″W
- Country: United States
- State: Tennessee
- County: Jackson

Area
  - Total: 11.11 sq mi (28.77 km^{2})
  - Land: 11.11 sq mi (28.77 km^{2})
  - Water: 0 sq mi (0.00 km^{2})
- Elevation: 981 ft (299 m)

Population (2020)
  - Total: 1,160
  - Density: 104.4/sq mi (40.32/km^{2})
- Time zone: UTC-6 (Central (CST))
  - Summer (DST): UTC-5 (CDT)
- Area code: 931
- GNIS feature ID: 1314954

Dodson Branch is a census-designated place and unincorporated community in Jackson County, Tennessee, United States. Its population was 1,044 as of the 2020 census.

== Demographics ==
Historical population
Census	Pop.	Note	%±
2010	1,074		—
2020	1,160		8.0%
U.S. Decennial Census

Dodson Branch first appeared as a census designated place in the 2010 U.S. census.

=== 2020 census ===
Dodson Branch CDP, Tennessee – Racial and ethnic composition Note: the US Census treats Hispanic/Latino as an ethnic category. This table excludes Latinos from the racial categories and assigns them to a separate category. Hispanics/Latinos may be of any race.
Race / Ethnicity (NH = Non-Hispanic)	Pop 2010	Pop 2020	% 2010	% 2020
White alone (NH)	1,024	1,071	95.34%	92.33%
Black or African American alone (NH)	7	0	0.65%	0.00%
Native American or Alaska Native alone (NH)	6	4	0.56%	0.34%
Asian alone (NH)	1	0	0.09%	0.00%
Native Hawaiian or Pacific Islander alone (NH)	0	0	0.00%	0.00%
Other race alone (NH)	0	2	0.00%	0.17%
Mixed race or Multiracial (NH)	12	56	1.12%	4.83%
Hispanic or Latino (any race)	24	27	2.23%	2.33%
Total	1,074	1,160	100.00%	100.00%
