= Baxter, Tennessee =

- City
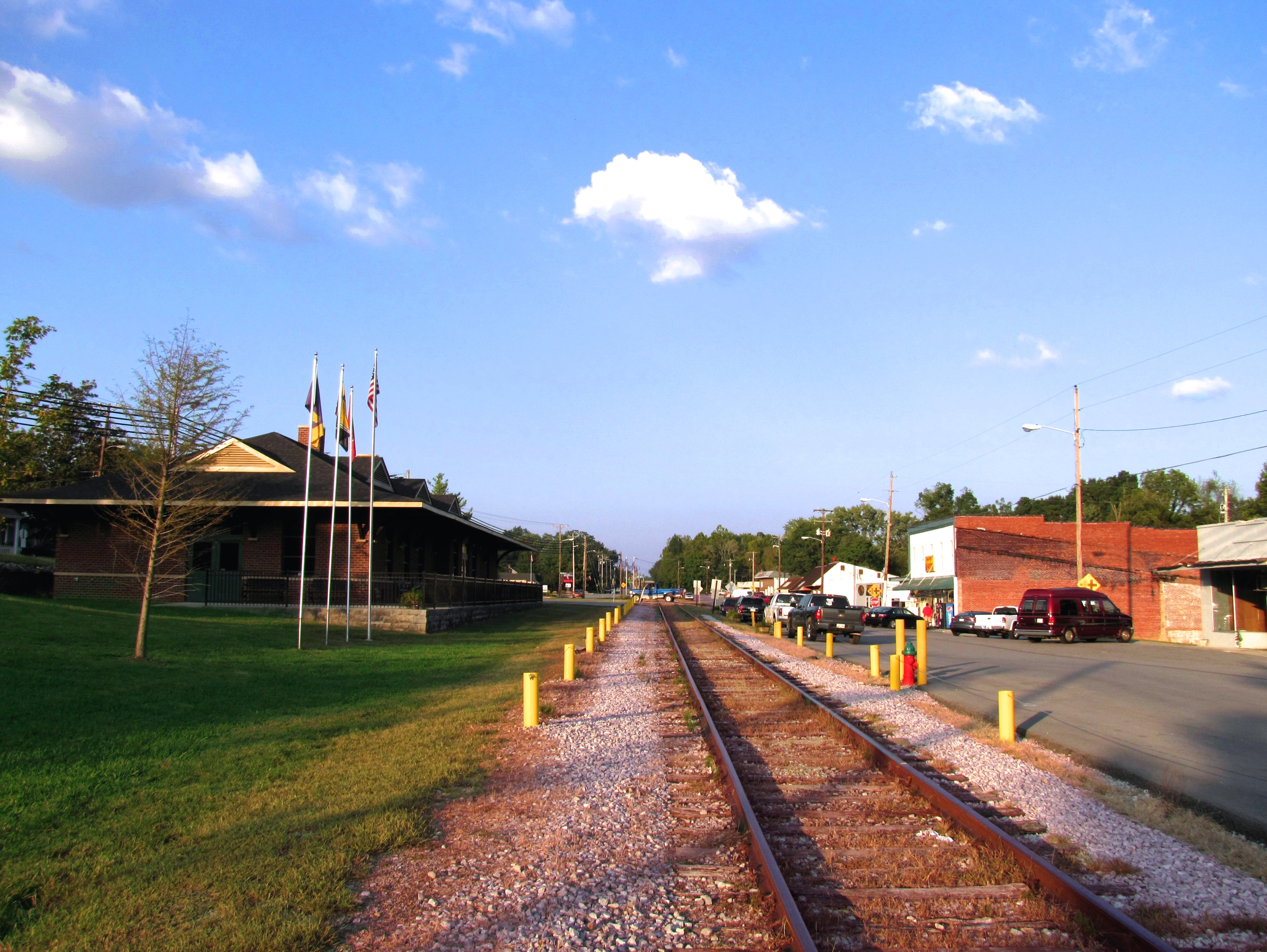
- Railroad tracks and Broad Street (right)

- Flag

- Location of Baxter in Putnam County, Tennessee.
- Coordinates: 36°9′18″N 85°38′11″W
- Country: United States
- State: Tennessee
- County: Putnam
- Established: 1890s
- Incorporated: 1915
- Named for: Jere Baxter

Area
  - Total: 3.14 sq mi (8.14 km^{2})
  - Land: 3.14 sq mi (8.14 km^{2})
  - Water: 0 sq mi (0.00 km^{2})
- Elevation: 1,027 ft (313 m)

Population (2020)
  - Total: 1,578
  - Density: 501.8/sq mi (193.75/km^{2})
- Time zone: UTC-6 (Central (CST))
  - Summer (DST): UTC-5 (CDT)
- ZIP code: 38544
- Area code: 931
- FIPS code: 47-03680
- GNIS feature ID: 1304999
- Website: cityofbaxter.com

Baxter is a city in Putnam County, Tennessee, United States. The population was 1,578 at the 2020 census. It is part of the Cookeville, Tennessee Micropolitan Statistical Area.

== Geography ==
Baxter is located at 36°9′18″N 85°38′11″W (36.155012, -85.636365).

According to the United States Census Bureau, the city has a total area of 1.9 square miles (4.9 km^{2}), all land.

Baxter was affected by the Tornado outbreak of March 2–3, 2020.

== Demographics ==
Historical population
Census	Pop.	Note	%±
1920	521		—
1930	541		3.8%
1940	576		6.5%
1950	861		49.5%
1960	853		−0.9%
1970	1,229		44.1%
1980	1,411		14.8%
1990	1,289		−8.6%
2000	1,279		−0.8%
2010	1,365		6.7%
2020	1,578		15.6%

=== 2020 census ===
Baxter racial composition
Race	Number	Percentage
White (non-Hispanic)	1,435	90.94%
Black or African American (non-Hispanic)	21	1.33%
Native American	5	0.32%
Asian	5	0.32%
Other/Mixed	63	3.99%
Hispanic or Latino	49	3.11%

As of the 2020 United States census, there were 1,578 people, 584 households, and 372 families residing in the town.

=== 2000 census ===
As of the census of 2000, there were 1,279 people, 548 households, and 357 families residing in the city. The population density was 690.4 inhabitants per square mile (266.6/km^{2}). There were 618 housing units at an average density of 333.6 per square mile (128.8/km^{2}). The racial makeup of the city was 97.89% White, 0.70% Native American, 0.08% Pacific Islander, 0.47% from other races, and 0.86% from two or more races. Hispanic or Latino of any race were 1.72% of the population.

There were 548 households, out of which 28.6% had children under the age of 18 living with them, 51.5% were married couples living together, 10.8% had a female householder with no husband present, and 34.7% were non-families. 31.6% of all households were made up of individuals, and 15.5% had someone living alone who was 65 years of age or older. The average household size was 2.33 and the average family size was 2.94.

In the city, the population was spread out, with 24.5% under the age of 18, 7.8% from 18 to 24, 25.4% from 25 to 44, 24.6% from 45 to 64, and 17.7% who were 65 years of age or older. The median age was 40 years. For every 100 females, there were 89.5 males. For every 100 females age 18 and over, there were 81.6 males.

The median income for a household in the city was $25,078, and the median income for a family was $30,083. Males had a median income of $21,731 versus $19,118 for females. The per capita income for the city was $12,708. About 19.2% of families and 23.3% of the population were below the poverty line, including 28.2% of those under the age of 18 and 17.7% of those 65 and older.

== Education ==
Baxter is served by the Putnam County School District with Upperman High School as the local high school. It also has Upperman Middle School serving grades 5-8.
