= Jackson County, Tennessee =

County in Tennessee, United States

- County
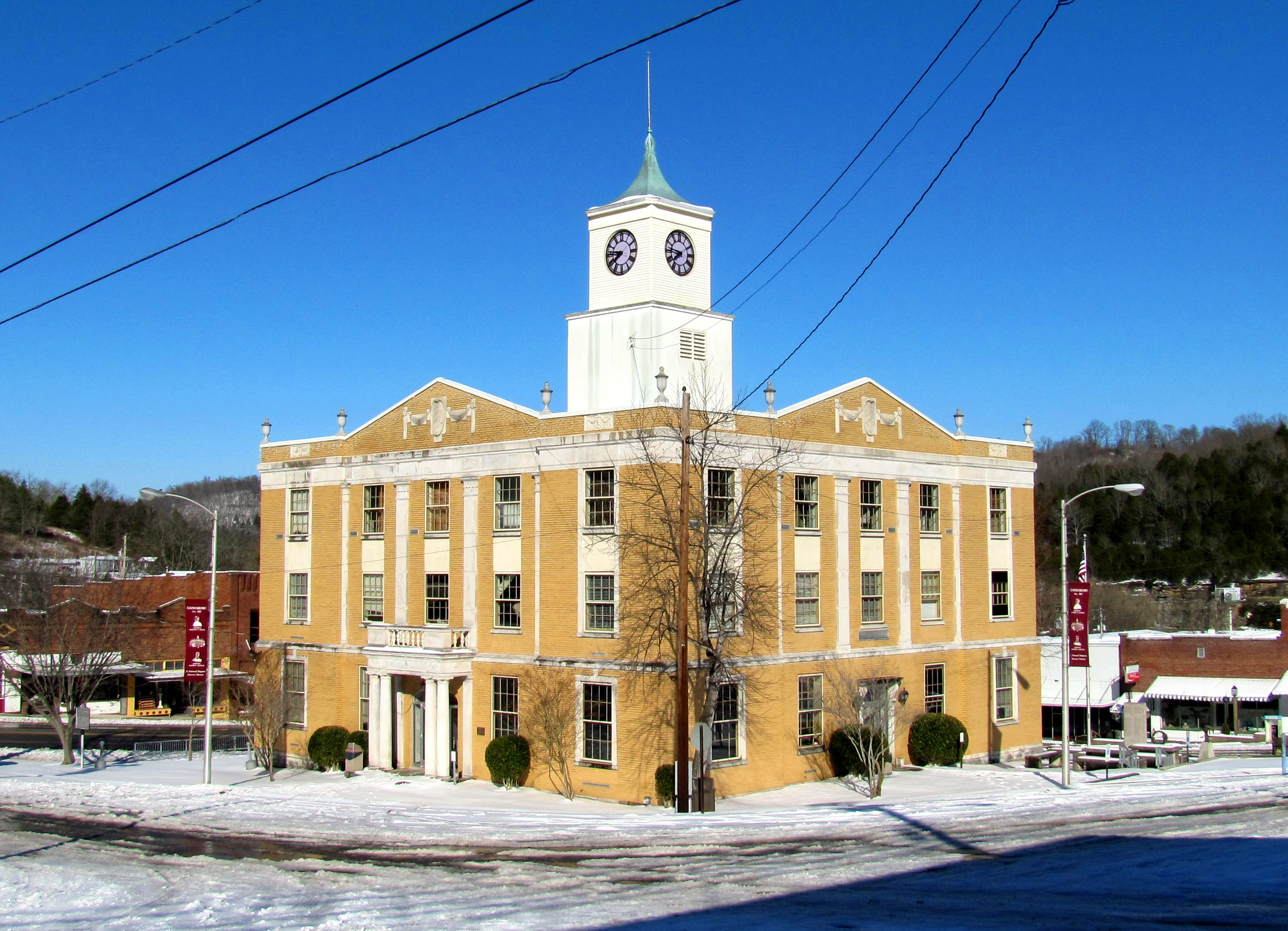
- Jackson County Courthouse in Gainesboro

- Location within the U.S. state of Tennessee
- Coordinates: 36°22′N 85°40′W
- Country: United States
- State: Tennessee
- Founded: 1801
- Named for: Andrew Jackson
- Seat: Gainesboro
- Largest town: Dodson Branch

Area
  - Total: 320 sq mi (830 km^{2})
  - Land: 308 sq mi (800 km^{2})
  - Water: 11 sq mi (28 km^{2}) 3.5%

Population (2020)
  - Total: 11,617
  - Estimate (2025): 12,466 ▲
  - Density: 38/sq mi (15/km^{2})
- Time zone: UTC−6 (Central)
  - Summer (DST): UTC−5 (CDT)
- Congressional district: 6th
- Website: www.jacksoncotn.com

Jackson County is a county located in the U.S. state of Tennessee. The population was 11,617 at the 2020 census. Its county seat is Gainesboro. Jackson is part of the Cookeville Micropolitan Statistical Area.

== History ==
Jackson County was created by an act of the Tennessee General Assembly on November 6, 1801. It was the 18th county established in the state. It was formed from part of Smith County plus Indian lands. The name honors Andrew Jackson, who by 1801 had already served as a U.S. Congressman and Senator from Tennessee, a Tennessee Supreme Court justice, and a colonel in the Tennessee militia. He became more widely known as commander at the Battle of New Orleans and as the seventh President of the United States.

In the 1790s, an Army outpost named Fort Blount was built 10 miles (16 km) west of Gainesboro on the Cumberland River, in what is now western Jackson County. Fort Blount was an important stop for travelers on Avery's Trace. Williamsburg, a town developed around the fort, served as the Jackson County seat from 1807 to 1819. The county's early records were all lost in a disastrous courthouse fire on August 14, 1872.

The 1970 Movie "I Walk The Line" starring Gregory Peck was filmed in Gainesboro and Jackson County.

== Geography ==
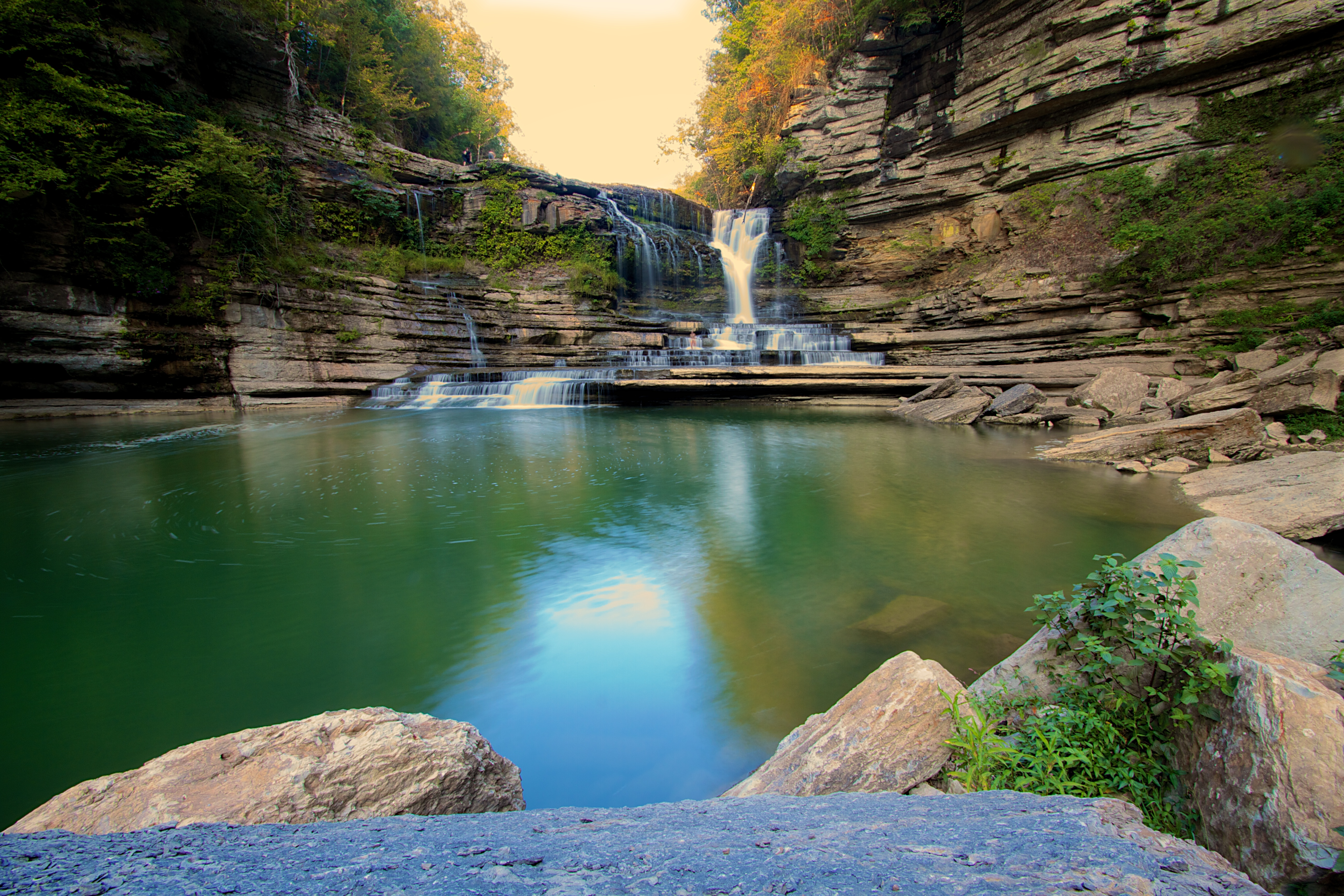
Cummins Falls

According to the U.S. Census Bureau, the county has a total area of 320 square miles (830 km^{2}), of which 308 square miles (800 km^{2}) is land and 11 square miles (28 km^{2}) (3.5%) is water.

Unlike most of Tennessee, small parts of far northern Jackson County drain into Jennings Creek outside of the Sun Belt due to a past error surveying the northern border of Middle and East Tennessee. The Sun Belt is defined by the Kinder Institute as being south of 36°30'N latitude, which was intended to be the northern border of Tennessee and is the actual northern border of West Tennessee.

=== Adjacent counties ===
- Clay County (north)
- Overton County (east)
- Putnam County (south)
- Smith County (southwest)
- Macon County (northwest)

=== State protected areas ===
- The Boils Wildlife Management Area
- Cummins Falls State Park
- Cordell Hull Wildlife Management Area (part)
- Washmorgan Hollow State Natural Area

=== Highways ===
- SR 53
- SR 56
- SR 85
- SR 96
- SR 151
- SR 135
- SR 262
- SR 290

== Demographics ==
Historical population
| Census | Pop. | Note | %± |
|---|---|---|---|
| 1810 | 5,401 | | — |
| 1820 | 7,593 | | 40.6% |
| 1830 | 9,698 | | 27.7% |
| 1840 | 12,872 | | 32.7% |
| 1850 | 15,673 | | 21.8% |
| 1860 | 11,725 | | −25.2% |
| 1870 | 12,583 | | 7.3% |
| 1880 | 12,008 | | −4.6% |
| 1890 | 13,325 | | 11.0% |
| 1900 | 15,039 | | 12.9% |
| 1910 | 15,036 | | 0.0% |
| 1920 | 14,955 | | −0.5% |
| 1930 | 13,589 | | −9.1% |
| 1940 | 15,082 | | 11.0% |
| 1950 | 12,348 | | −18.1% |
| 1960 | 9,233 | | −25.2% |
| 1970 | 8,141 | | −11.8% |
| 1980 | 9,398 | | 15.4% |
| 1990 | 9,297 | | −1.1% |
| 2000 | 10,984 | | 18.1% |
| 2010 | 11,638 | | 6.0% |
| 2020 | 11,617 | | −0.2% |
| 2025 (est.) | 12,466 | ▲ | 7.3% |
U.S. Decennial Census; 1790-1960 1900-1990; 1990-2000 2010-2014

=== Racial and ethnic composition ===
Jackson County, Tennessee – Racial and ethnic composition Note: the US Census treats Hispanic/Latino as an ethnic category. This table excludes Latinos from the racial categories and assigns them to a separate category. Hispanics/Latinos may be of any race.
| Race / ethnicity (NH = Non-Hispanic) | Pop 1980 | Pop 1990 | Pop 2000 | Pop 2010 | Pop 2020 | % 1980 | % 1990 | % 2000 | % 2010 | % 2020 |
|---|---|---|---|---|---|---|---|---|---|---|
| White alone (NH) | 9,326 | 9,212 | 10,763 | 11,267 | 10,778 | 99.23% | 99.09% | 97.99% | 96.81% | 92.78% |
| Black or African American alone (NH) | 21 | 7 | 16 | 29 | 31 | 0.22% | 0.08% | 0.15% | 0.25% | 0.27% |
| Native American or Alaska Native alone (NH) | 1 | 19 | 37 | 52 | 35 | 0.01% | 0.20% | 0.34% | 0.45% | 0.30% |
| Asian alone (NH) | 8 | 19 | 7 | 10 | 17 | 0.09% | 0.20% | 0.06% | 0.09% | 0.15% |
| Native Hawaiian or Pacific Islander alone (NH) | x | x | 1 | 1 | 0 | x | x | 0.01% | 0.01% | 0.00% |
| Other race alone (NH) | 0 | 2 | 0 | 5 | 28 | 0.00% | 0.02% | 0.00% | 0.04% | 0.24% |
| Mixed race or Multiracial (NH) | x | x | 71 | 110 | 483 | x | x | 0.65% | 0.95% | 4.16% |
| Hispanic or Latino (any race) | 42 | 38 | 89 | 164 | 245 | 0.45% | 0.41% | 0.81% | 1.41% | 2.11% |
| Total | 9,398 | 9,297 | 10,984 | 11,638 | 11,617 | 100.00% | 100.00% | 100.00% | 100.00% | 100.00% |

=== 2020 census ===
As of the 2020 census, the county had 11,617 people, 4,907 households, and 5,819 housing units, 15.7% of which were vacant. The median age was 47.4 years, with 18.9% of residents under the age of 18 and 23.0% aged 65 or older. For every 100 females there were 99.2 males, and for every 100 females age 18 and over there were 97.8 males.

Of the 4,907 households, 24.8% had children under the age of 18 living in them, 48.0% were married-couple households, 20.1% were households with a male householder and no spouse or partner present, and 25.1% were households with a female householder and no spouse or partner present. About 28.8% of households were made up of individuals and 14.3% had someone living alone who was 65 years of age or older.

There were 5,819 housing units, of which 15.7% were vacant; among occupied units 77.9% were owner-occupied and 22.1% were renter-occupied, with homeowner vacancy rate 1.7% and rental vacancy rate 5.6%.

<0.1% of residents lived in urban areas, while 100.0% lived in rural areas.

=== 2000 census ===
As of the census of 2000, there were 10,984 people, 4,466 households, and 3,139 families residing in the county. The population density was 36 people per square mile (14 people/km^{2}). There were 5,163 housing units at an average density of 17 units per square mile (6.6/km^{2}). The racial makeup of the county was 98.63% White, 0.15% Black or African American, 0.34% Native American, 0.06% Asian, 0.03% Pacific Islander, 0.12% from other races, and 0.67% from two or more races. 0.81% of the population were Hispanic or Latino of any race.

There were 4,466 households, out of which 28.80% had children under the age of 18 living with them, 55.30% were married couples living together, 10.30% had a female householder with no husband present, and 29.70% were non-families. 25.50% of all households were made up of individuals, and 10.20% had someone living alone who was 65 years of age or older. The average household size was 2.43 and the average family size was 2.89.

In the county, the population was spread out, with 22.30% under the age of 18, 7.80% from 18 to 24, 28.20% from 25 to 44, 26.80% from 45 to 64, and 15.00% who were 65 years of age or older. The median age was 40 years. For every 100 females, there were 97.80 males. For every 100 females age 18 and over, there were 94.90 males.

The median income for a household in the county was $26,502, and the median income for a family was $32,088. Males had a median income of $24,759 versus $19,511 for females. The per capita income for the county was $15,020. About 15.10% of families and 18.10% of the population were below the poverty line, including 15.10% of those under age 18 and 22.50% of those age 65 or over.

== Communities ==
=== Town ===
- Gainesboro (county seat)

=== Census-designated place ===
- Dodson Branch

=== Unincorporated communities ===
- Center Grove
- Granville
- Mayfield
- Nameless
- North Springs
- Shady Grove
- Whitleyville

== Politics ==
United States presidential election results for Jackson County, Tennessee
| Year | Republican | | Democratic | | Third party(ies) | |
| Year | No. | % | No. | % | No. | % |
|---|---|---|---|---|---|---|
| 1912 | 743 | 31.78% | 1,344 | 57.49% | 251 | 10.74% |
| 1916 | 740 | 32.95% | 1,506 | 67.05% | 0 | 0.00% |
| 1920 | 1,187 | 51.97% | 1,097 | 48.03% | 0 | 0.00% |
| 1924 | 354 | 24.62% | 1,074 | 74.69% | 10 | 0.70% |
| 1928 | 614 | 42.17% | 827 | 56.80% | 15 | 1.03% |
| 1932 | 256 | 12.89% | 1,726 | 86.91% | 4 | 0.20% |
| 1936 | 422 | 19.83% | 1,702 | 79.98% | 4 | 0.19% |
| 1940 | 605 | 22.74% | 2,046 | 76.92% | 9 | 0.34% |
| 1944 | 695 | 32.88% | 1,407 | 66.56% | 12 | 0.57% |
| 1948 | 536 | 24.51% | 1,502 | 68.68% | 149 | 6.81% |
| 1952 | 1,138 | 40.25% | 1,686 | 59.64% | 3 | 0.11% |
| 1956 | 881 | 33.13% | 1,743 | 65.55% | 35 | 1.32% |
| 1960 | 1,049 | 39.80% | 1,539 | 58.38% | 48 | 1.82% |
| 1964 | 551 | 19.39% | 2,291 | 80.61% | 0 | 0.00% |
| 1968 | 673 | 24.90% | 1,122 | 41.51% | 908 | 33.59% |
| 1972 | 956 | 45.98% | 1,085 | 52.19% | 38 | 1.83% |
| 1976 | 591 | 16.56% | 2,959 | 82.91% | 19 | 0.53% |
| 1980 | 995 | 28.15% | 2,480 | 70.16% | 60 | 1.70% |
| 1984 | 1,544 | 34.42% | 2,894 | 64.51% | 48 | 1.07% |
| 1988 | 1,168 | 37.15% | 1,962 | 62.40% | 14 | 0.45% |
| 1992 | 708 | 16.63% | 3,208 | 75.34% | 342 | 8.03% |
| 1996 | 944 | 22.69% | 2,889 | 69.43% | 328 | 7.88% |
| 2000 | 1,384 | 29.11% | 3,304 | 69.50% | 66 | 1.39% |
| 2004 | 2,026 | 40.07% | 2,998 | 59.30% | 32 | 0.63% |
| 2008 | 2,185 | 48.54% | 2,224 | 49.41% | 92 | 2.04% |
| 2012 | 2,383 | 56.96% | 1,739 | 41.56% | 62 | 1.48% |
| 2016 | 3,236 | 72.46% | 1,129 | 25.28% | 101 | 2.26% |
| 2020 | 4,118 | 77.36% | 1,135 | 21.32% | 70 | 1.32% |
| 2024 | 4,586 | 80.80% | 1,040 | 18.32% | 50 | 0.88% |

As a secessionist Middle Tennessee county, Jackson County was historically one of the most Democratic in the state. Only once up to 2008 did a Democrat lose the county – when Warren G. Harding carried Jackson County by ninety votes in his record popular-vote landslide of 1920, due to large increases in voter turnout for the isolationist cause Harding espoused. Along with Lewis County it was one of two Tennessee counties to be carried by both Hubert Humphrey in 1968 and George McGovern in 1972.

However, like most of Appalachia and surrounding areas, Jackson County has since 2000 seen a very rapid shift towards the Republican Party due to opposition to the Democratic Party's liberal views on social issues. Whereas Al Gore (who grew up in neighboring Smith County) won almost seventy percent of the vote in 2000, Barack Obama won by only thirty-nine votes in 2008, Mitt Romney became only the second Republican to carry the county in 2012 and Donald Trump four years later received over 70% of the vote - the first time that any Republican even surpassed 60% of the vote in Jackson County. Trump successively gained more and more in Jackson County in 2020 and 2024, even reaching 80% of the vote in the latter, although Republican Senator Marsha Blackburn failed to reach 80% on the same ballot in the concurrent U.S. Senate election.

Despite this drastic shift in the county overall at the federal level, Democrats continued to compete in the Gainesboro town limits in statewide elections as recently as 2018, when former Governor Phil Bredesen lost Gainesboro by just a 4.4% margin even as he lost to Blackburn statewide by double-digits. Republican Governor Bill Lee also did more poorly in Gainesboro than statewide in both 2018 and 2022. Furthermore, conservative Democrat John Mark Windle represented Jackson County in the state House until 2022, when he switched to being an independent politician, Jackson County was drawn out of the 41st state House district and into the neighboring 40th district and Windle narrowly lost re-election to Republican Ed Butler in his redrawn district.

Real estate development company RidgeRunner purchased property near Gainesboro in 2022 with plans to establish new communities for conservative Christian families. The development has attracted media attention with proponents viewing it as a revitalization effort for a county that experienced population decline, bringing new residents and economic activity. Critics argue the project promotes exclusionary ideals, with some labeling it an attempt to establish enclaves rooted in Christian nationalism, raising concerns among local residents about cultural and demographic changes in the county.

== See also ==
- National Register of Historic Places listings in Jackson County, Tennessee
