= Gainesboro, Tennessee =

Town in Tennessee, United States

- Town
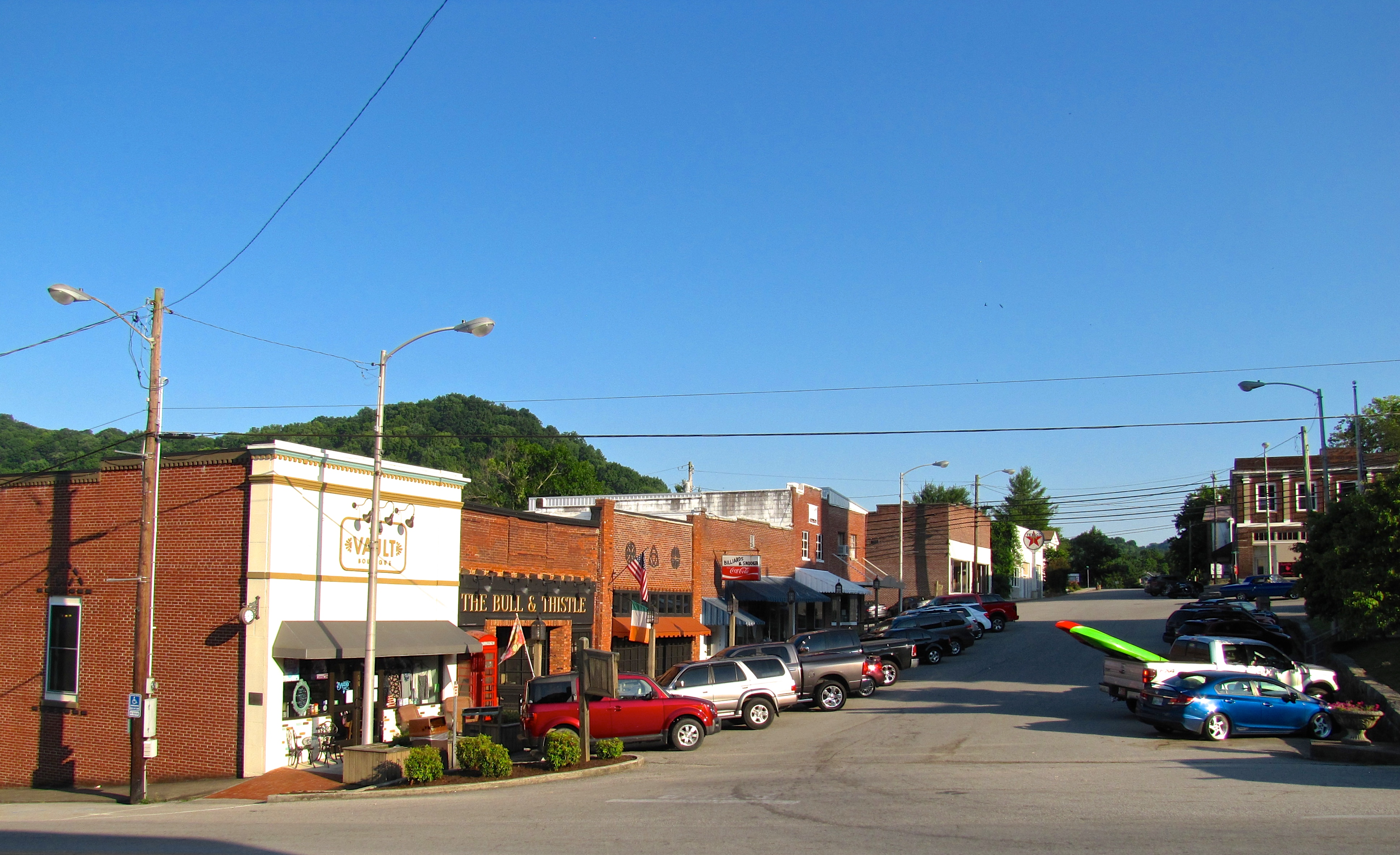
- Downtown Gainesboro

- Location of Gainesboro in Jackson County and Tennessee.
- Coordinates: 36°21′35″N 85°39′17″W
- Country: United States
- State: Tennessee
- County: Jackson
- Settled: 1790s
- Established: 1817
- Incorporated: 1905
- Named after: Edmund P. Gaines

Area
  - Total: 1.78 sq mi (4.61 km^{2})
  - Land: 1.56 sq mi (4.03 km^{2})
  - Water: 0.22 sq mi (0.58 km^{2})
- Elevation: 574 ft (175 m)

Population (2020)
  - Total: 920
  - Density: 591/sq mi (228.2/km^{2})
- Time zone: UTC-6 (Central (CST))
  - Summer (DST): UTC-5 (CDT)
- ZIP code: 38562
- Area code: 931
- FIPS code: 47-28420
- GNIS feature ID: 1285070

Gainesboro (/ˈɡeɪnzbʌrə/) is a town in and the county seat of Jackson County, Tennessee, United States. The population was 920 at the 2020 census.

Gainesboro is part of the Cookeville, Tennessee Micropolitan Statistical Area.

== History ==
The Gainesboro vicinity was a popular destination for long hunters as early as the 1770s, as natural salt licks drew rich game to the area. In the 1790s, Avery's Trace passed nearby, with travellers along the road lodging at Fort Blount about 10 miles to the west. Gainesboro was named after U.S. Army Brevet Major General Edmund P. Gaines (1777–1849). It has been the seat of Jackson County since 1820. The 1970 John Frankenheimer Movie I Walk the Line starring Gregory Peck and featuring Johnny Cash's song I Walk the Line was filmed in Gainesboro.

== Geography ==
According to the United States Census Bureau, Gainesboro is located approximately 15 miles northwest of Cookeville and has a total area of 1.8 square miles (4.7 km^{2}), of which 1.6 square miles (4.1 km^{2}) are land and 0.3-square-mile (0.78 km^{2}) (14.29%) is water.

=== Climate ===
Climate data for Gainesboro, Tennessee, 1991–2020 normals, extremes 1997–present
Month	Jan	Feb	Mar	Apr	May	Jun	Jul	Aug	Sep	Oct	Nov	Dec	Year
Record high °F (°C)	78 (26)	84 (29)	87 (31)	90 (32)	95 (35)	105 (41)	108 (42)	103 (39)	100 (38)	97 (36)	88 (31)	77 (25)	108 (42)
Mean maximum °F (°C)	67.9 (19.9)	72.9 (22.7)	79.8 (26.6)	86.2 (30.1)	90.3 (32.4)	95.1 (35.1)	96.1 (35.6)	96.0 (35.6)	93.1 (33.9)	86.9 (30.5)	77.1 (25.1)	70.7 (21.5)	97.8 (36.6)
Mean daily maximum °F (°C)	47.3 (8.5)	53.3 (11.8)	62.1 (16.7)	72.7 (22.6)	80.5 (26.9)	87.3 (30.7)	89.9 (32.2)	89.5 (31.9)	83.8 (28.8)	73.6 (23.1)	61.1 (16.2)	51.3 (10.7)	71.0 (21.7)
Daily mean °F (°C)	35.4 (1.9)	40.0 (4.4)	47.7 (8.7)	57.1 (13.9)	66.1 (18.9)	73.8 (23.2)	77.4 (25.2)	76.4 (24.7)	69.8 (21.0)	58.4 (14.7)	46.9 (8.3)	38.9 (3.8)	57.3 (14.1)
Mean daily minimum °F (°C)	23.6 (−4.7)	26.8 (−2.9)	33.3 (0.7)	41.4 (5.2)	51.7 (10.9)	60.4 (15.8)	64.9 (18.3)	63.3 (17.4)	55.7 (13.2)	43.3 (6.3)	32.8 (0.4)	26.5 (−3.1)	43.6 (6.5)
Mean minimum °F (°C)	5.3 (−14.8)	10.1 (−12.2)	16.7 (−8.5)	26.7 (−2.9)	36.7 (2.6)	50.9 (10.5)	56.5 (13.6)	55.6 (13.1)	44.0 (6.7)	28.4 (−2.0)	17.7 (−7.9)	13.1 (−10.5)	3.8 (−15.7)
Record low °F (°C)	−13 (−25)	−6 (−21)	5 (−15)	17 (−8)	29 (−2)	34 (1)	50 (10)	48 (9)	35 (2)	21 (−6)	9 (−13)	−8 (−22)	−13 (−25)
Average precipitation inches (mm)	4.79 (122)	4.95 (126)	5.27 (134)	4.74 (120)	5.46 (139)	5.52 (140)	4.95 (126)	4.07 (103)	3.43 (87)	3.67 (93)	3.88 (99)	5.77 (147)	56.50 (1,435)
Average snowfall inches (cm)	2.5 (6.4)	0.8 (2.0)	0.7 (1.8)	0.0 (0.0)	0.0 (0.0)	0.0 (0.0)	0.0 (0.0)	0.0 (0.0)	0.0 (0.0)	0.0 (0.0)	0.0 (0.0)	0.6 (1.5)	4.6 (11.7)
Average precipitation days (≥ 0.01 in)	11.0	10.5	12.1	11.1	11.7	10.5	9.1	7.3	8.0	8.5	9.6	10.9	120.3
Average snowy days (≥ 0.1 in)	1.0	0.7	0.3	0.0	0.0	0.0	0.0	0.0	0.0	0.0	0.0	0.3	2.3
Source 1: NOAA
Source 2: National Weather Service (mean maxima/minima 2006–2020)

== Demographics ==
Historical population
Census	Pop.	Note	%±
1880	352		—
1890	462		31.3%
1910	408		—
1920	351		−14.0%
1930	556		58.4%
1940	671		20.7%
1950	992		47.8%
1960	1,021		2.9%
1970	1,101		7.8%
1980	1,119		1.6%
1990	1,002		−10.5%
2000	879		−12.3%
2010	962		9.4%
2020	920		−4.4%

=== 2020 census ===
Gainesboro town, Tennessee – Racial and ethnic composition Note: the US Census treats Hispanic/Latino as an ethnic category. This table excludes Latinos from the racial categories and assigns them to a separate category. Hispanics/Latinos may be of any race.
Race / Ethnicity (NH = Non-Hispanic)	Pop 2000	Pop 2010	Pop 2020	% 2000	% 2010	% 2020
White alone (NH)	862	949	848	98.07%	98.65%	92.17%
Black or African American alone (NH)	0	3	8	0.00%	0.31%	0.87%
Native American or Alaska Native alone (NH)	1	1	0	0.11%	0.10%	0.00%
Asian alone (NH)	4	1	0	0.46%	0.10%	0.00%
Native Hawaiian or Pacific Islander alone (NH)	0	0	0	0.00%	0.00%	0.00%
Other race alone (NH)	0	0	2	0.00%	0.00%	0.22%
Mixed race or Multiracial (NH)	7	3	31	0.80%	0.31%	3.37%
Hispanic or Latino (any race)	5	5	31	0.57%	0.52%	3.37%
Total	879	962	920	100.00%	100.00%	100.00%

As of the 2020 United States census, there were 920 people, 347 households, and 152 families residing in the town.

=== 2000 census ===
As of the census of 2000, there were 879 people, 373 households, and 208 families residing in the town. The population density was 562.5 inhabitants per square mile (217.2/km^{2}). There were 430 housing units at an average density of 275.2 per square mile (106.3/km^{2}). The racial makeup of the town was 98.29% White, 1.98% African American, 0.11% Native American, 0.46% Asian, 0.34% from other races, and 0.80% from two or more races. Hispanic or Latino of any race were 0.57% of the population.

There were 373 households, of which 16.9% had children under the age of 18 living with them, 36.2% were married couples living together, 13.9% had a female householder with no husband present, and 44.0% were non-families. 38.6% of all households were made up of individuals, and 18.5% had someone living alone who was 65 years of age or older. The average household size was 2.00 and the average family size was 2.61.

In the town, the population was spread out, with 13.5% under the age of 18, 8.8% from 18 to 24, 20.4% from 25 to 44, 26.6% from 45 to 64, and 30.7% who were 65 years of age or older. The median age was 51 years. For every 100 females, there were 68.7 males. For every 100 females age 18 and over, there were 67.4 males.

The median income for a household in the town was $19,861, and the median income for a family was $30,250. Males had a median income of $24,091 versus $21,932 for females. The per capita income for the town was $17,798. About 20.3% of families and 27.8% of the population were below the poverty line, including 49.0% of those under age 18 and 25.7% of those age 65 or over.

== Notable people ==
- Andrew J. Allen, Classical saxophonist.
- Charlotte Burks, Tennessee State Senator.
- Mounce Gore Butler - member of the United States House of Representatives.
- Alvan Cullem Gillem - Union army general.
- John J. Gore - United States District Court judge
- Jamie Dailey - Bluegrass musician of the music group Dailey & Vincent and member of the Grand Ole Opry.
