= List of Tennessee state parks and natural areas =

This is a list of state parks and natural areas in the U.S. state of Tennessee.

Tennessee State Parks (green), Natural Areas (orange), and former areas (black)
(Hover mouse over pog to popup clickable link)

== State parks ==
Tennessee has 61 designated state parks, operated by the Tennessee Department of Environment and Conservation (TDEC). The largest park, Justin P. Wilson Cumberland Trail, is made up of land along the Cumberland Trail, stretching from Cumberland Gap at the Virginia state line to Prentice Cooper State Forest in Marion County, just northwest of Chattanooga. The smallest state park is Bicentennial Capitol Mall, at just 19 acres (7.7 ha). The newest state park is Ocoee River State Park, established in September 2025.

Park Name	County/Counties	Size		Year Established
Park Name	County/Counties	acres	ha	Year Established
Bicentennial Capitol Mall State Park	Davidson	19	7.7	1996
Big Cypress Tree State Park	Weakley	330	130	1973
Big Hill Pond State Park	McNairy	4,138	1,675	1977
Big Ridge State Park	Union	3,687	1,492	1934
Bledsoe Creek State Park	Sumner	164	66	1973
Booker T. Washington State Park	Hamilton	353	143	1937
Burgess Falls State Park	Putnam	350	140	1971
Cardwell Mountain State Archaeological Park	Warren	534	216	2026
Cedars of Lebanon State Park	Wilson	9,420	3,810	1937
Cherokee Trail of Tears State Park	Meigs	29	12	2026
Chickasaw State Park	Chester	1,435	581	1937
Cordell Hull Birthplace State Park	Pickett	58	23	1997
Cove Lake State Park	Campbell	673	272	1937
Cumberland Mountain State Park	Cumberland	1,720	700	1938
Cummins Falls State Park	Jackson	211	85	2011
David Crockett Birthplace State Park	Greene	105	42	1973
David Crockett State Park	Lawrence	1,100	450	1959
Devil's Backbone State Park	Lewis	1,500	610	2026
Dry Branch State Park	Hickman, Lewis, Perry	2,169	878	2026
Dunbar Cave State Park	Montgomery	110	45	1973
Edgar Evins State Park	DeKalb	6,300	2,500	1975
Fall Creek Falls State Park	Van Buren, Bledsoe	26,000	11,000	1935
Feiry Gizzard State Park	Grundy, Marion	7,811	3,161	1978
Fort Loudoun State Historic Park	Monroe	1,200	490	1977
Fort Pillow State Park	Lauderdale	1,642	664	1971
Frozen Head State Park	Morgan	24,000	9,700	1970
Harpeth River State Park	Cheatham, Davidson	520	210	1978
Harrison Bay State Park	Hamilton	1,200	490	1937
Head of the Crow State Park	Grundy	4,258	1,723	2025
Henry Horton State Park	Marshall	1,523	616	1961
Hiwassee Scenic River State Park	Polk	85	34	1972
Indian Mountain State Park	Campbell	213	86	1971
Johnsonville State Historic Park	Humphreys	2,000	810	1971
Justin P. Wilson Cumberland Trail State Park	Anderson, Bledsoe, Campbell, Claiborne, Cumberland, Hamilton, Marion, Morgan, Rhea, Scott, Sequatchie	31,500	12,700	1998
Long Hunter State Park	Davidson	2,600	1,100	1978
Meeman-Shelby Forest State Park	Shelby	12,539	5,074	1944
Middle Fork Bottoms State Park	Madison	860	350	2024
Montgomery Bell State Park	Dickson	3,782	1,531	1943
Mousetail Landing State Park	Perry	1,247	505	1986
Natchez Trace State Park	Henderson	10,154	4,109	1955
Nathan Bedford Forrest State Park	Benton	2,587	1,047	1929
Norris Dam State Park	Anderson, Campbell	4,038	1,634	1953
North Chickamauga Creek Gorge State Park	Hamilton	6,000	2,400	2024
Ocoee River State Park	Polk	2,501	1,012	2025
Old Stone Fort State Archaeological Park	Coffee	776	314	1973
Panther Creek State Park	Hamblen	1,444	584	1967
Paris Landing State Park	Henry	841	340	1945
Pickett CCC Memorial State Park	Pickett	19,200	7,800	1942
Pickwick Landing State Park	Hardin	681	276	1969
Pinson Mounds State Archaeological Park	Madison	1,200	490	1966
Port Royal State Park	Montgomery, Robertson	26	11	1978
Radnor Lake State Park & Natural Area	Davidson	1,368	554	1973
Red Clay State Park	Bradley	263	106	1979
Reelfoot Lake State Park	Lake, Obion	280	110	1925
Roan Mountain State Park	Carter	2,006	812	1959
Rock Island State Park	Warren, White	883	357	1969
Rocky Fork State Park	Unicoi	2,036	824	2012
Savage Gulf State Park	Grundy, Sequatchie	19,000	7,700	2023
Scott's Gulf Wilderness State Park	White	9,500	3,800	2025
Seven Islands State Birding Park	Knox	425	172	2013
Sgt. Alvin C. York State Historic Park	Fentress	295	119	1967
South Cumberland State Park	Franklin, Marion, Grundy	12,166	4,923	1978
Standing Stone State Park	Overton	855	346	1939
Sycamore Shoals State Historic Area	Carter	70	28	1975
Tims Ford State Park	Franklin	2,200	890	1978
T. O. Fuller State Park	Shelby	1,138	461	1938
Warriors' Path State Park	Sullivan	950	380	1952

== State natural areas ==
Tennessee has 85 state natural areas that are divided into two classes:

- Class I – Scenic-Recreational
- Class II – Natural-Scientific

Nine areas have restricted access and are not open to the public; a tenth, Hubbard's Cave, has limited access during the summer.

Park Name	Class	County/Counties	Size		Property Owner	Access Status (Public/Private)	Year Established
Park Name	Class	County/Counties	acres	ha	Property Owner	Access Status (Public/Private)	Year Established
Auntney Hollow State Natural Area	II	Lewis	26	11	Private	Private – No access	2002
Barnett's Woods State Natural Area	II	Montgomery	40	16	State of Tennessee	Public – Limited access	1995
Bays Mountain State Natural Area	I	Sullivan	3,650	1,480	City of Kingsport	Public – Full access	1973
Beaman Park State Natural Area	II	Davidson	1,678	679	Nashville Parks & Recreation	Public – Full access	2013
Big Cypress Tree State Natural Area	I	Weakley	270	110	State of Tennessee	Public – Full access	1973
Bone Cave State Natural Area	II	Van Buren	400	160	State of Tennessee	Public – Limited access	1974
Burgess Falls State Natural Area	I	Putnam	217	88	State of Tennessee	Public – Full access	1973
Campbell Bend Barrens State Natural Area	II	Roane	35	14	Private	Public – Limited access	2006
Carroll Cabin Barrens State Natural Area	II	Decatur	250	100	State of Tennessee	Public – Full access	2002
Mr. and Mrs. Harry Lee Carter State Natural Area	II	Franklin	931	377	State of Tennessee	Public – Full access	1975
Cedars of Lebanon State Forest Natural Area	II	Wilson	2,690	1,090	State of Tennessee	Public – Limited access	1974
Chimneys State Natural Area	I	Marion	33	13	State of Tennessee	Public – Limited access	1999
Coldiz Cove State Natural Area	II	Fentress	165	67	State of Tennessee	Public – Full access	1984
Couchville Cedar Glade State Natural Area	II	Davidson, Wilson	140	57	State of Tennessee	Public – Full access	1995
Crowder Cemetery Barrens State Natural Area	II	Roane	15	6.1	Private	Public – Limited access	2006
Devil's Backbone State Natural Area	I	Lewis	950	380	State of Tennessee	Public – Full access	1997
Dog Cove State Natural Area & Beecher Wallace Homestead	—	White	757	306	State of Tennessee	Public – Full access	2019
Duck River Complex State Natural Area	II	Maury	2,612	1,057	State of Tennessee	Public – Full access	2002
Dunbar Cave State Natural Area	I	Montgomery	144	58	State of Tennessee	Public – Limited access	1973
Elsie Quarterman Cedar Glade State Natural Area	II	Rutherford	185	75	USACE	Public – Limited access	1998
Fall Creek Falls State Natural Area	II	Bledsoe, Van Buren	16,181	6,548	State of Tennessee	Public – Full access	1974
Falling Water Falls State Natural Area	I	Hamilton	136	55	State of Tennessee	Public – Full access	1973
Fate Sanders Barrens State Natural Area	II	Rutherford	230	93	USACE	Public – Limited access	1999
Flat Rock Cedar Glades & Barrens State Natural Area	II	Rutherford	846	342	State of Tennessee	Public – Full access	1999
Frozen Head State Natural Area	I, II	Morgan	15,150	6,130	State of Tennessee	Public – Full access	1974
Gattinger's Cedar Glade & Barrens State Natural Area	II	Rutherford, Wilson	57	23	Private	Private – No access	2003
Ghost River State Natural Area	I	Fayette	2,306	933	State of Tennessee	Public – Full access	1997
Grundy Forest State Natural Area	I	Grundy	234	95	State of Tennessee	Public – Full access	1974
Hampton Creek Cove State Natural Area	I	Carter	693	280	State of Tennessee	Public – Full access	1986
Hawkins Cove State Natural Area	II	Franklin	249	101	State of Tennessee	Public – Limited access	1985
Hicks Gap State Natural Area	II	Marion	350	140	State of Tennessee	Public – Limited access	1989
Hill Forest State Natural Area	II	Davidson	225	91	Friends of Warner Parks; Nashville Parks & Recreation	Public – Limited access	2010
Honey Creek State Natural Area	II	Pickett	109	44	National Park Service (Big South Fork)	Public – Full access	1973
House Mountain State Natural Area	I	Knox	527	213	State of Tennessee	Public – Full access	1987
Hubbard's Cave State Natural Area	II	Warren	50	20	The Nature Conservancy	Public – Limited access during summer	1995
John & Hester Lane Cedar Glades State Natural Area	II	Wilson	45	18	State of Tennessee	Public – Limited access	2009
John Noel at Bon Aqua State Natural Area	I	Hickman	35	14	State of Tennessee	Public – Full access	2007
Langford Branch State Natural Area	II	Lewis	23	9.3	Swan Conservation Trust	Private – No access	2001
Laurel–Snow State Natural Area	II	Rhea	2,259	914	State of Tennessee	Public – Full access	1973
Lost Creek State Natural Area	—	White	200	81	State of Tennessee	Public – Full access	2012
Lucius Burch Jr. Forest State Natural Area	I	Shelby	728	295	Shelby County	Public – Full access	1988
Manus Road Cedar Glade State Natural Area	II	Rutherford	22	8.9	State of Tennessee	Private – No access	2004
May Prairie State Natural Area	II	Coffee	492	199	State of Tennessee	Public – Limited access	1973
Meeman-Shelby State Natural Area	II	Shelby	11,000	4,500	State of Tennessee	Public – Full access	2002
Montgomery Bell State Natural Area	II	Dickson	1,086	439	State of Tennessee	Public – Full access	1998
Morrison Meadow State Natural Area	II	Warren	20	8.1	State of Tennessee	Public – Limited access	2008
Mount View Glade State Natural Area	II	Davidson	9	3.6	State of Tennessee	Public – Full access	1995
Natural Bridge State Natural Area	I	Franklin	3	1.2	State of Tennessee	Public – Full access	1973
North Chickamauga Creek Gorge State Natural Area	II	Hamilton, Sequacthie	7,093	2,870	State of Tennessee	Public – Full access	1999
Overbridge State Natural Area	II	Rutherford	70	28	State of Tennessee	Public – Limited access	1995
Old Forest State Natural Area	II	Shelby	125	51	City of Memphis	Public – Full access	2011
Ozone Falls State Natural Area	I	Cumberland	43	17	State of Tennessee	Public – Full access	1973
Piney Falls State Natural Area	II	Rhea	818	331	State of Tennessee	Public – Full access	1973
Pogue Creek Canyon State Natural Area	II	Fentress	3,000	1,200	State of Tennessee	Public – Full access	2006
Powell River Preserve State Natural Area	II	Claiborne	15	6.1	State of Tennessee	Public – Full access	1995
Radnor Lake State Park & Natural Area	II	Davidson	1,368	554	State of Tennessee	Public – Full access	1973
Reelfoot Lake State Natural Area	I	Lake, Obion	18,000	7,300	State of Tennessee	Public – Full access	1973
Riverwoods State Natural Area	II	Shelby	21	8.5	State of Tennessee	Public – Full access	1978
Roundtop Mountain State Natural Area	II	Sevier	237	96	National Park Service (Great Smoky Mountains)	Public – Full access	1974
Rugby State Natural Area	I	Morgan	762	308	State of Tennessee	Public – Full access	2006
Savage Gulf State Natural Area	II	Grundy, Sequatchie	15,590	6,310	State of Tennessee	Public – Full access	1974
Sequatchie Cave State Natural Area	II	Marion	133	54	State of Tennessee	Public – Full access	2001
Sherwood Forest State Natural Area	—	Franklin	3,075	1,244	State of Tennessee	Public – Full access	2020
Short Springs State Natural Area	I	Coffee	420	170	State of Tennessee, TVA, City of Tullahoma	Public – Full access	1994
Stillhouse Hollow Falls State Natural Area	I	Maury	90	36	State of Tennessee	Public – Full access	2006
Stinging Fork Falls State Natural Area	II	Rhea	783	317	State of Tennessee	Public – Full access	1973
Stones River Cedar Glade and Barrens State Natural Area	II	Rutherford	185	75	National Park Service	Public – Full access	2003
Sunk Lake State Natural Area	II	Lauderdale	1,873	758	State of Tennessee	Public – Full access	1986
Sunnybell Cedar Glade State Natural Area	II	Rutherford	36	15	State of Tennessee	Private – No access	1995
Taylor Hollow State Natural Area	II	Sumner	173	70	The Nature Conservancy	Private – Access by permission only	1995
Twin Arches State Natural Area	II	Fentress, Pickett, Scott	1,500	610	National Park Service (Big South Fork)	Public – Full access	1974
Vesta Cedar Glade State Natural Area	II	Wilson	150	61	State of Tennessee	Public – Full access	1986
Vine Cedar Glade State Natural Area	II	Wilson	35	14	State of Tennessee	Public – Limited access	2000
Virgin Falls State Natural Area	II	White	1,157	468	State of Tennessee	Public – Full access	1973
Walker Branch State Natural Area	II	Hardin	520	210	State of Tennessee	Public – Limited access	1997
Walls of Jericho State Natural Area	II	Franklin	750	300	State of Tennessee	Public – Full access	2006
Walnut Knob State Natural Area	—	Smith	18	7.3	State of Tennessee	Private – No access	2020
Walterhill Floodplain State Natural Area	II	Rutherford	34	14	State of Tennessee	Public – Limited access	1985
Washmorgan Hollow State Natural Area	II	Jackson	73	30	The Nature Conservancy	Public – Limited access	1995
Watauga River Bluffs State Natural Area	II	Carter	50	20	State of Tennessee	Public – Full access	1998
William B. Clark Conservation Area	II	Fayette	460	190	The Nature Conservancy	Public – Full access	2000
William L. Davenport Refuge State Natural Area	II	Polk	120	49	State of Tennessee	Public – Limited access	1997
Wilson School Road Forest and Cedar Glades State Natural Area	II	Marshall	58	23	State of Tennessee	Private – No access	2008
Window Cliffs State Natural Area	II	Putnam	275	111	State of Tennessee	Public – Full access	2014

== State scenic rivers ==
Tennessee state scenic rivers are divided into three classes:

- Class I – Natural River Area – Free flowing, unpolluted, and with primitive shorelines and scenic vistas generally inaccessible except by trail.
- Class II – Pastoral River Area – Free flowing, unpolluted, and with shorelines and scenic vistas partially or predominantly used for agricultural and other recreational activities.
- Class III – Developed/Partially Developed River Area – Free flowing, unpolluted, and with shorelines and vistas more developed.

River	Class	County/Counties	Location	Length		Year Designated
River	Class	County/Counties	Location	miles	km	Year Designated
Blackburn Fork Scenic River	I	Jackson	Cummins Mill Road downstream for 1.5 miles (2.4 km), the entire distance within Cummins Falls State Park	1.5	2.4	1968
Blackburn Fork Scenic River	II	Jackson	1.5 miles (2.4 km) downstream of Cummins Mill Road to the confluence of the Roaring River	12.5	20.1	1968
Buffalo Scenic River	II	Lawrence	Entire section within Lawrence County, from the head of the river to the Lewis County line	15.5	24.9	1968
Clinch Scenic River	III	Anderson, Knox, Roane	Melton Hill Dam upstream to the Highway 62 bridge in Solway	18.5	29.8	1996
Collins Scenic River	II	Grundy	Section within Savage Gulf State Natural Area	5	8.0	1968
Conasauga Scenic River	I	Polk	Segment in the Cherokee National Forest from the Georgia state line downstream to the U.S. 411 bridge in Conasauga	9	14	1969
Duck Scenic River	II	Maury	Iron Bridge Road near Columbia upstream to Maury–Marshall county line	37.3	60.0	2001
French Broad Scenic River	III	Cocke	North Carolina state line downstream to J.W. Walters Bridge in Douglas Lake	33	53	1968
Harpeth Scenic River	II	Davidson, Rutherford	Entire section in Rutherford County, from the head of the river to the Williamson County line	6.75	10.86	1968
Harpeth Scenic River	III	Davidson, Rutherford	Section in Davidson County, from the Williamson County line at Highway 100 bridge to the Interstate 40 bridge	8.5	13.7	1968
Harpeth Scenic River	II	Davidson, Rutherford	Section in Davidson County, from the Interstate 40 bridge to the Cheatham County line	6	9.7	1968
Hatchie Scenic River	I	Hardeman, Haywood, Lauderdale, Madison, McNairy, Tipton	Entire length in Tennessee from Mississippi state line to Mississippi River confluence	163	262	1970
Hiwassee Scenic River	III	Polk	Segment in the Cherokee National Forest from the North Carolina state line downstream to the U.S. 411 bridge in Delano	23	37	1968
Obed Wild & Scenic River	I	Cumberland, Morgan	Western edge of the Catoosa WMA to the confluence with the Emory River (24.3 mi (39.1 km)), as well as: Clear Creek from the Cumberland–Morgan line to the confluence with the Obed River (18.5 mi (29.8 km)); Daddys Creek from the Cumberland–Morgan line to the confluence with the Obed River (2.3 mi (3.7 km)); Emory River from the confluence with the Obed River to the Nemo Bridge (0.9 mi (1.4 km))	46	74	1976
Roaring River Scenic River	I	Jackson, Overton	Highway 136 bridge to a point 2 miles (3.2 km) downstream	2	3.2	1968
Roaring River Scenic River	II	Jackson, Overton	A point 2 miles (3.2 km) downstream of the Highway 136 bridge to the confluence with the Cumberland River at Cordell Hull Lake	19	31	1968
Soak Creek Scenic River	III	Bledsoe, Rhea	Confluence with Georgia Branch in Bledsoe County downstream to its confluence with the Piney River in Spring City	6.75	10.86	2016
Spring Creek Scenic River	I	Jackson, Overton	Waterloo Mill downstream to the Jackson–Overton county line	4.4	7.1	1968
Spring Creek Scenic River	II	Jackson, Overton	Jackson–Overton county line to the confluence with the Roaring River	4.6	7.4	1968
Tuckahoe Creek Scenic River	III	Knox	Entire length in Knox County, from Jefferson County line to confluence with French Broad River	16.1	25.9	1968

== Former state parks and natural areas ==
=== State parks ===
- Poor Valley Creek State Park (cancelled)
- Ross Creek Landing

=== State natural areas ===
- Morril's Cave (Worley's Cave) State Natural Area, Sullivan County
- Short Mountain-Jim Cummings State Natural Area, Cannon County, 500 acres (200 ha)
- Sneed Road Cedar Glade State Natural Area, Williamson County, 1 acre (0.40 ha)

== See also ==
- List of U.S. national parks
