= Dry Branch State Park =

Protected area in Tennessee, United States

- IUCN category V (protected landscape/seascape)
- Location within Tennessee
- Location: Hickman County, Tennessee, Lewis County, Tennessee, Perry County, Tennessee
- Nearest city: Hohenwald, Tennessee
- Coordinates: 35°35′49″N 87°37′43″W
- Area: 2,169 acres (8.78 km^{2})
- Established: 2007 as Dry Branch State Natural Area, 2026 as Dry Branch State Park
- Governing body: Tennessee Department of Environment and Conservation
- Website: Dry Branch State Park

Dry Branch State Park is a 2,169 acres (8.78 km^{2}) state park located in Lewis, Hickman, and Perry counties in the U.S. state of Tennessee. The land was first designated as a natural area of interest in 1997 when it was owned by International Paper. The Nature Conservancy purchased the land from International Paper in 2006. It was turned over to the state in 2007 and designated as a State Natural Area. The area is protected due to the presence of rare ecosystems supporting the growth of endangered plants, including Tennessee yellow-eyed grass, which is found only in five other locations in the state.

June 2025, the state announced plans to be re-designate the natural area as a State Park and open it to the public. Picnic and camping areas, hiking trails, and educational facilities are planned. In October 2025, the Tennessee State Building Commission approved $16.5 million for construction of a ranger station, maintenance facilities, and infrastructure to support the new park. The park was officially dedicated September 2026, with plans to open fully to visitors in the future.
