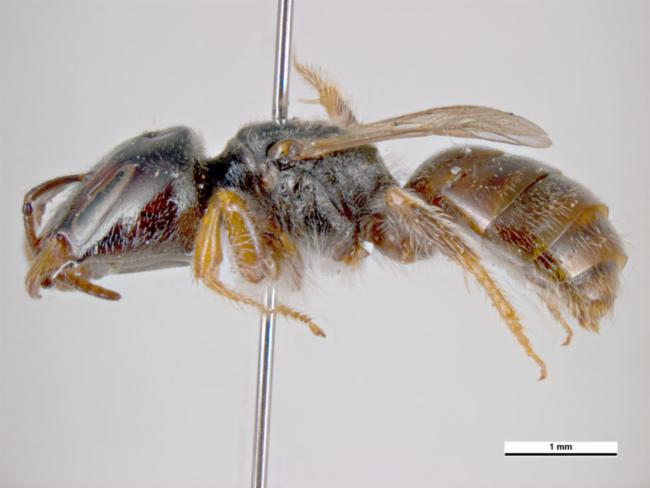

Scientific classification
- Kingdom: Animalia
- Phylum: Arthropoda
- Clade: Pancrustacea
- Class: Insecta
- Order: Hymenoptera
- Family: Halictidae
- Genus: Lasioglossum
- Species: L. hemichalceum

Binomial name
- Lasioglossum hemichalceum (Cockerell, 1923)

= Lasioglossum hemichalceum =

Species of bee

Lasioglossum hemichalceum, which has sometimes been confused with L. erythrurum, is a sweat bee endemic to Australia. Large numbers of unrelated females will typically share a single nest, a behavior referred to as "communal". Nests are constructed underground by the independent efforts of the females. L. hemichalceum will typically begin creating new colonies during the summer, with brood production from late November through the first few months of spring. Members of this species do not demonstrate aggressive behavior towards one another. As the size of the colony increases, the reproductive potential of each female does not change, unlike many species of bees.

== Taxonomy and phylogeny ==
Lasioglossum hemichalceum is part of the genus Lasioglossum, subgenus Chilalictus. Other species within this genus include Lasioglossum malachurum, Lasioglossum zephyrus and Lasioglossum clarum. Lasioglossum species which occupy parts of Africa and central Europe demonstrate varying types of social behavior—ranging from solitary to communal and even semi-social. L. hemichalceum is in the company of nearly 150 other species that fall within the subgenus Chilalictus, all native to Australia.

== Description and identification ==
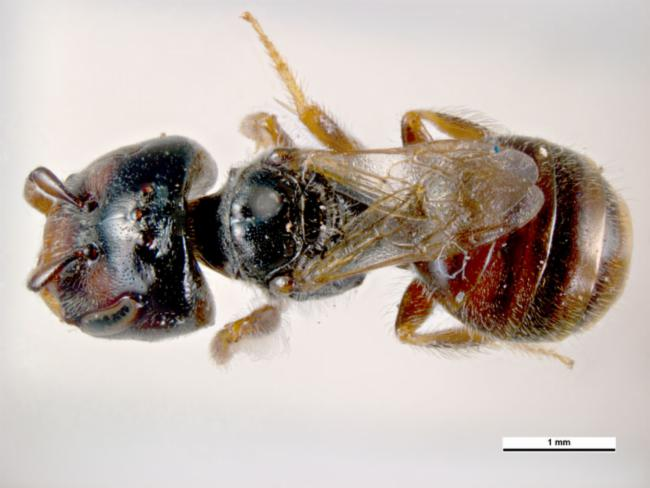
Preserved full body specimen of Lasioglossum hemichalceum

=== Morphology ===
Lasioglossum hemichalceum can be identified by its medium long antennas, often off-white in color, and triangular head. While many are dull black in color, they may display hints of purple, green, or copper. Males typically have thinner bodies than females and also have less hair on their hind legs for carrying pollen. Females usually range from 4.7–5 mm in length, and have wider heads than males (being about 1.5–1.6 mm in width). Typical males have slightly shorter body lengths, and heads that are more narrow in length (approximately 3.8–4.7 mm in length, and 1.3–1.5 mm in width). In addition, the legs of L. hemichalceum tend to be dark brown or black in color, although there have been instances of red-brown pigmentation. In terms of coloring, there are not significant differences between females and males. Furthermore, because L. hemichalceum is a communal species, there are not queens who are distinguishable from workers—almost all females are the same in appearance.

=== Male dimorphism ===
There are two morphs of male Lasioglossum hemichalceum: those with typical proportions and small in size, or those referred to as macrocephalic. Macrocephalic morphology is characterized by a disproportionately large head and mandibles. Macrocephalic males have wider heads than both females and small males and also have a heavier weight when they are pupae than most female pupae. Small males typically live away from the nest, while macrocephalic males remain inside.

=== Nest ===
Female Lasioglossum hemichalceum build their nests underground. They will construct burrows and carry the dirt that was removed to the surface. At colony initiation, the females will construct a large number of tunnels; however, as females get ready to overwinter, they will participate less and less in nest construction. They also do not coordinate with one another when constructing the tunnels, but do so independently of one another.

== Distribution and habitat ==
L. hemichalceum is endemic to specific regions of Australia. L. hemichalceum can be found in New South Wales, Victoria, and Queensland. Their environment in southern Australia is one that has wet winters that are fairly mild and summers that are warm and dry. Nests are not frequently built above ground and are typically constructed by separate groups of egg-laying females.

== Colony cycle ==
=== Colony initiation ===
Colony initiation starts late in the month of November and typically ends in the early spring, around February or April, after females have overwintered. The individual members of the group have two options in terms of where they would like to initiate a new colony. Their first option is to find depressions in soft ground that are appropriate for building a nest and build a new nest in accordance with the description above. However, they may also choose to re-use the nest from the year before, which happens about 40% of the time. In certain cases, members may even choose to add on to old nests so that a mixture of both old and new nests are created. New nests will be created regardless of whether or not there are other colonies who are occupying the same nest. This process of initiation is conducted sequentially, in which one female will start digging and other females will join her (this number is variable). The number of total bees that inhabit the nest will typically reach over 100, with a larger percentage of females than males. These females are also unrelated, which is different from other communal and eusocial species.

=== Colony growth and decline ===
During this time, the reproductive females will raise two separate generations of broods, one that is reared by the mother, and the second which is reared by both surviving mothers and their daughters (which originated from the first brood). However, the number of broods that are initiated depends on climate conditions. For example, if it is rainy rather than dry, only one brood will be raised rather than two (which is more typical). Furthermore, if new nests are created, it typically happens between the first and second brood initiations. In this way, the colony initiation cycle and nesting cycle are in rotation with one another. Once the eggs have been laid, the egg-laying females will construct individual brood cells, each with a certain amount of nectar and pollen. This pollen is rolled into a small ball, and the egg is laid on top of the ball before the cell is sealed. Differences in the size of these pollen balls (which are the only food that is provided to the growing larvae) is thought to contribute to differences in weight for adults. The pupal stage lasts 18 days alone, however the full cycle spans approximately 6 weeks. Colony decline happens during the summer months between the end of egg production and overwintering. However, because the females of L. hemichalceum migrate between different nests, more than one nest exists at a time.

== Behavior ==
=== Communal behavior ===
Lasioglossum hemichalceum demonstrates behavior typical for a communal species. This means that females will occupy the same nest but care for their own brood, and they all have the capacity to reproduce. They often have colonies that are small in size, and relatively well concealed. Females of L. hemichalceum will share nectar with one another via trophallaxis. They also demonstrate remarkably cooperative behavior towards each other even though the majority of the colony members are not related. This has demonstrated that interactions between group members are not restricted to kin, and that L. hemichalceum tend to differ from solitary or eusocial species. Unlike most communal species of bees, L. hemichalceum do not occupy nests over the course of multiple generations, however they may re-use a nest at some point in their life cycle.

=== Dominance hierarchy ===
Because L. hemichalceum is a communal species, it displays egalitarian behavior. This means that females do not display a distinct division of labor or hierarchy. All individual females are also able to reproduce, which is probably related to the highly cooperative behavior and egalitarian behaviors that these bees display. In accordance with their lack of hierarchy, females rarely display threatening behaviors and do not discriminate in terms of genetic relatedness for these threatening behaviors. Thus, agonistic displays are not directed towards individuals based on their familiarity as nestmates or relatives. This egalitarian system stands in contrast to that of L. zephyrus and other eusocial halictines with division of labor.

=== Mating behavior ===
L. hemichalceum displays different mating behaviors for different morphologies. Males who are born with the typical small body morphology mate away from the nest. This contributes to outbreeding and makes the genetic pool much more diverse. However, males that display the macrocephalic body morphology will remain in the nest and mate with females there. In order to mate with resident females, macrocephalic males will fight each other until they are severely injured, and even kill each other. Because macrocephalic males are able to mate with several females, their offspring will be genetically related, thus, the females migrate away from their natal nests in order to reduce intra-colony relatedness. Females will typically overwinter and will not start reproducing until the months of the spring season. Some seasons are worse than others in terms of food availability and predation, so some females will decide to stay and mate in the colony rather than leave, although this is less typical behavior for adult females. If a female needs to exit the nest to obtain nectar or pollen, it is sometimes better to take advantage of this opportunity and mate outside the colony.

== Kin selection ==
=== Genetic relatedness ===
Genetic relatedness among colonies of L. hemichalceum differs depending on the type of relationship. Because L. hemichalceum is a communal species, there are not queen-worker dynamics that can be identified in terms of genetic relatedness. Genetic relatedness is determined by using mean relatedness values (r) among various sizes of colonies (most samples had approximately 200 member colonies). For mother-daughter relationships, genetic relatedness is low in comparison to other species of bee. Although mothers and daughters share the minimum of one allele, only 11% of daughters who were immature shared the colony with their mother. This indicates that most young females do not have their mother present. However, this statistic was even lower for mother-son relationships (r=.125). Indeed, only about 20% of all juveniles in the colony had any type of closely related adult present. These statistics seem to reveal that parental care is highly generalized and occurs in the absence of kin selection and is probably related to the fact that females act indiscriminately towards each other. Nest switching and migratory behaviors also result in the decreased genetic relatedness among adults and their respective kins.

In terms of genetic relatedness among sister-sister relationships and sister-brother relationships, however, there is a substantial difference. L. hemichalceum tends to avoid inbreeding whenever it is possible because of their sex determination system, which uses a single locus mechanism. Should members of the same family breed with one another, there is the possibility that the male offspring will either be haplodiploid (normal phenotype) or diploid (sterile phenotype). Thus inbreeding is a highly avoided behavior by many of the females. This lack of inbreeding impacts the genetic relatedness of siblings. For sister-sister relatedness there tends to be a significant number of full sister relationships within the colony among juveniles. This may be attributed to the fact that juveniles do not need to avoid their female siblings in the same way that they do male siblings in order to avoid inbreeding. Along the same lines, sister-brother relatedness is low within the same nest because the females tend to leave if there are male relatives nearby.

=== Costs and benefits to sociality ===
There are many advantages and disadvantages for L. hemichalceum in terms of living communally in a large colony. While many members may be living with unrelated individuals (about 50% of adult females do not have daughters or sisters of any type nearby in the colony), they gain many advantages. One of the primary benefits is constant care for larvae and offspring. It takes approximately six weeks for a larva to reach adulthood, and by having other adults nearby that are able to guard the nest, the risk of predation from ants is significantly reduced. Another benefit is life insurance. Foraging is highly risky activity, and should a mother be killed while foraging, her offspring will be protected by other members of the colony. Thus, forming a colony that is larger in size (the typical colony is about 200), is advantageous in terms of brood protection. However, there are disadvantages as well. While the presence of adult L. hemichalceum is effective at warding off unwanted predators, such as ants, there are no active defense behaviors. This makes it less advantageous to be in a large colony in moments when active defense is needed. Furthermore, another disadvantage are cheaters who exploit the cooperative protection that the colony offers. It is thought that communal protection of unknown broods prevents exploitation, however this theory is still being explored.

=== Kin recognition ===
While it is thought that L. hemichalceum displays kin recognition, it is yet to be confirmed. Originally the cooperative behavior and act of trophallaxis that is displayed towards both genetically related kin and non-related kin was attributed to lack of kin recognition. However, it is now thought that females simply do not show special treatment towards their own kin. This is exemplified by a lack of guarding against unknown individuals, and the migration of females between different nests. Thus, this attitude of universal acceptance has led scientists to conclude that there is either the absence of recognition cues, or lack of responsive behavior to those cues. Furthermore, while there are no differences in behavior pattern that can be attributed to relatedness, there are differences associated with the grouping of several nests, suggesting that there may be environmental cues for behavior.

== Agonistic behavior ==
Unlike other species of Lasiolgossum,L. hemichalceum rarely display agonistic behaviors towards another. Agonistic behaviors typically include patterns such as lunging or moving their bodies in the shape of a C while pointing the stinger and mandibles towards the offender. Typically the C-shaped body (also known as C-posture) behavioral pattern was observed in about 19% of conflicts, and even fewer in terms of the lunging pattern. This demonstrates that although they are capable of displaying agonistic behaviors, they choose not to. Lack of agonistic behavioral patterns is a characteristic of the L. hemichalceum that is very different from L. hemichalceum's close relative, L. zephyrum.

== Variable pupae nutrition ==
For L. hemichalceum larval nutrition was one of the largest environmental factors in determining male morphology. When a female prepares to lay eggs, they first construct individual cells and place small pollen balls (a mixture of nectar and pollen) into the cells. However, the variation in both the size of the cell and the pollen ball seems to impact whether or not male morphology is macrocephalic or that of a normal male. The factors impact one another; for example, the dimensions and volume of the cell dictate the amount of nectar and pollen that females gathered, and the subsequent size of the pollen balls for the cells. However, the size of the pollen balls also affect the pathway for development. Typically females will place fertilized female eggs on pollen balls that are proportionately bigger than the ones given to males. However, it is hypothesized that macrocephalic males may be the result of females unintentional placement of unfertilized eggs (male eggs) onto pollen balls that are intended for female eggs. By providing males with additional nutrition, they are able to attain heavier weights as pupae, and develop into larger, bulkier adult males. Thus, dimorphic male development in L. hemichalceum is thought to be impacted by cell size and pollen ball size, rather than just genetic differences between males.
