= Hiwassee Scenic River State Park =

State park in Tennessee, United States

- Location within Tennessee Location within the United States
- Location: Polk County, Tennessee
- Coordinates: 35°13′35″N 84°30′10″W
- Established: 1972
- Named for: Hiwassee River
- Governing body: Tennessee Department of Environment and Conservation
- Website: Hiwassee Scenic River State Park

The Hiwassee Scenic River State Park is a Tennessee state park in Polk County, Tennessee, United States, that provides access to the Hiwassee River.

In 1972, a 23-mile (37 km) stretch of the Hiwassee River, extending from the North Carolina state line to U.S. Route 411, was the first river to be designated by the State Scenic River Program. In September 2025, the park, which had been called the Hiwassee/Ocoee Scenic River State Park since 1983, was split into two separate parks with each taking the name of their respective river.

== Amenities ==
The park has a campground, Gee Creek Campground, with 47 sites plus 8 separate group campsites. Hiking and fishing is also permitted.
