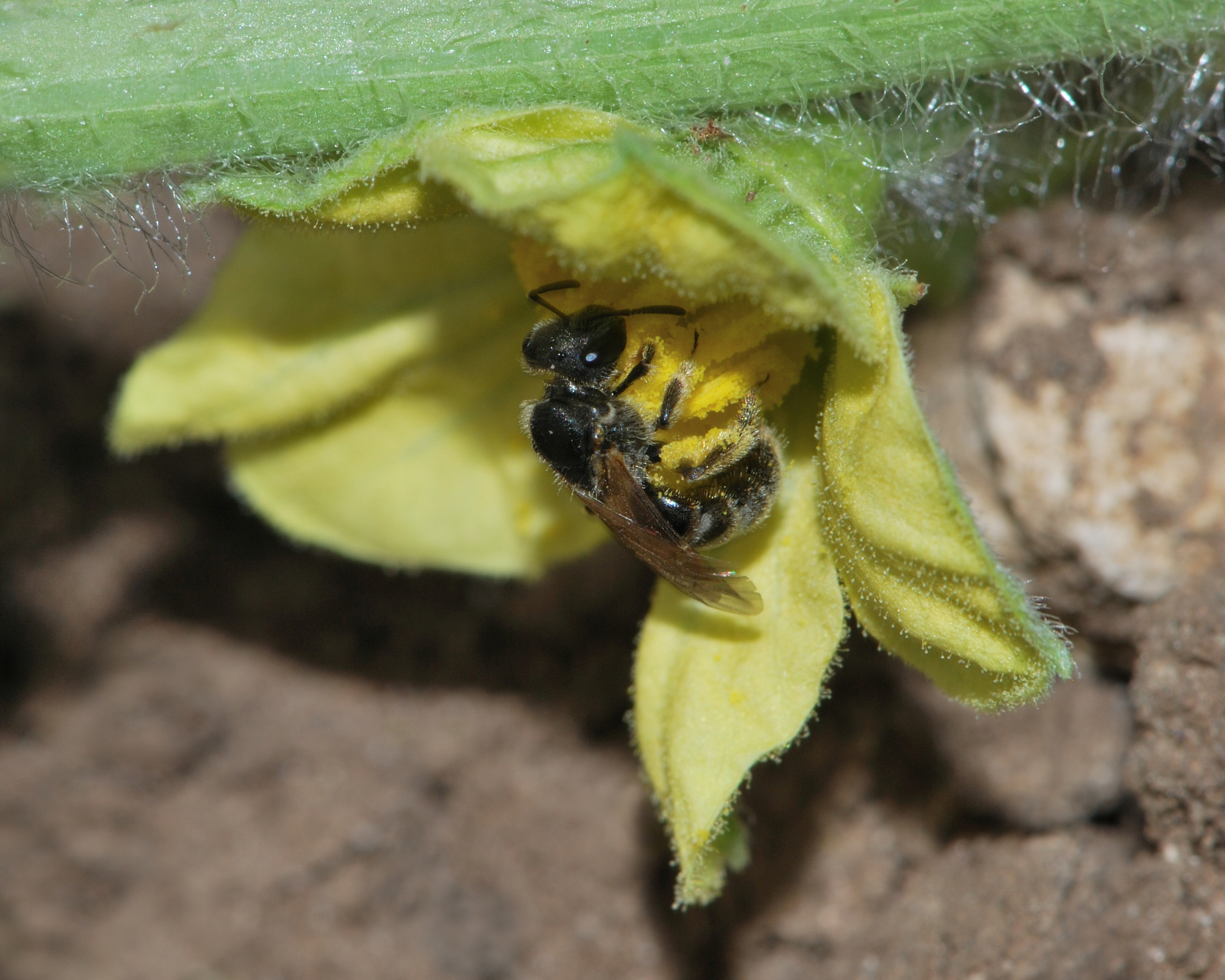
- Female

Scientific classification
- Kingdom: Animalia
- Phylum: Arthropoda
- Clade: Pancrustacea
- Class: Insecta
- Order: Hymenoptera
- Family: Halictidae
- Genus: Lasioglossum
- Species: L. malachurum

Binomial name
- Lasioglossum malachurum (Kirby, 1802)

Synonyms
- Melitta malachurum Kirby, 1802; Lasioglossum longulum Curtis, 1833

= Lasioglossum malachurum =

Species of bee

Lasioglossum malachurum, the sharp-collared furrow bee, is a small European halictid bee. This species is obligately eusocial, with queens and workers, though the differences between the castes are not nearly as extreme as in honey bees. Early taxonomists mistakenly assigned the worker females to a different species from the queens. They are small (about 1 cm), shiny, mostly black bees with off-white hair bands at the bases of the abdominal segments. L. malachurum is one of the more extensively studied species in the genus Lasioglossum, also known as sweat bees. Researchers have discovered that the eusocial behavior in colonies of L. malachurum varies significantly dependent upon the region of Europe in which each colony is located.

== Taxonomy and phylogeny ==
L. malachurum was described by the entomologist William Kirby in 1802. This species of bees fall within the genus Lasioglossum, which is the largest bee genus. Lasioglossum falls within the family Halictidae, which includes small to midsized bees and is commonly referred to as the sweat bee family because the Halictidae are frequently attracted to human perspiration. L. malachurum falls within the order Hymenoptera, a large order of generally winged insects containing wasps, bees, and ants. One species of lasioglossum that is closely related to the L. malachurum is L. hemichalceum.

== Description ==
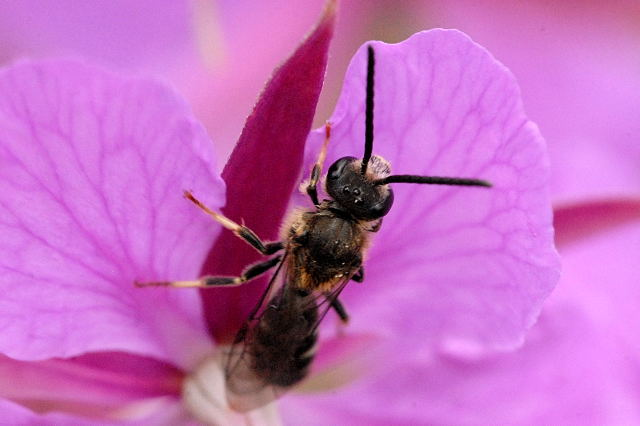
Lasioglossum.malachurum

=== Caste dimorphism ===
Physical size is a major distinguishing feature between queens and gynes versus female worker bees. Queens consistently are larger in body size than workers. Queens also tend to have worn wings and worn mandibles as a result of higher activity, in addition to greater ovarian development correlating with the reproductive capacity of queens. Queens also generally have abundant fat stores. This physical dimorphism persists throughout all stages of the lifecycle, from pupae to adult. Rarely, queens can be abnormally small compared to the size of workers, but abnormally large workers have never been observed in the wild.

=== Nest identification ===
The sweat bee has a simple nesting architecture consisting of a vertical tunnel into the ground ending in a compartment reserved for brood-rearing. They nest underground, like Lasioglossum zephyrus, but they do not form the same complex structures. Nest entrances are frequently concealed using scattered foliage. For L. malachurum, thousands of nests can be found located within a small region in nesting aggregations, which suggests that the bees likely have some sort of identification mechanism for conspecific nests. In fact, nest entrances and brood cell linings are both impregnated with secretions from the Dufour's gland of the bees, which plays a role in nest orientation. Nests are dug into hard, compact soil and can be sealed from within by the queen using her abdomen. Because nests are dug into hard soil, construction of a nest represents a significant energy expense to a queen, which explains why gynes frequently usurp other nests rather than founding one of their own. L. malachurum is a Western Palaearctic species and nests can be found across Southern England and the Channel Islands, most of continental Europe, and North Africa.

== Distribution and habitat ==
L. malachurum is found across England, continental Europe, and northern Africa, so is capable of inhabiting a broad range of habitats and climates. Differences in the climes of the various habitats can frequently impact the social behavior of L. malachurum within that habitat. The length of summer, for example, can affect the length of the breeding season and thereby impact the number of broods a queen may have. The longer breeding seasons in Southern Europe can also lead to reproductive capacity in worker bees, making L. malachurum in those regions not purely eusocial. Female workers in southern European colonies of L. malachurum consequently have significantly more developed ovaries than their counterparts in northern European colonies.

Due to the relatively broad range of nesting habitats of the species, L. malachurum is subject to a myriad of climate-based selective pressures that cause a differential in behavior dependent upon location. Researchers have identified a tendency for L. malachurum in southern European climes to be characterized by more activity and the production of more worker broods prior to the production of a gyne brood, whereas L. malachurum in northern European climes exhibit less activity and only a single worker brood prior to the gyne brood.

== Colony cycle ==
The queens of L. malachurum, following fertilization the previous year, begin to appear in the spring, when food sources are plentiful to sustain them after the long overwintering period. Although several females usually outwinter in the same burrow with little conflict, they start to act aggressively until a single female is left in possession of the burrow, leaving the evicted females to obtain or excavate burrows of their own.

Each female with a nest tunnel then begins to build brood cells in short side passages which she excavates to the side of the main passage. Immediately following construction, each brood cell is mass-provisioned with a mixture of pollen and nectar in the form of a firm, doughy mass. An egg is laid on each pollen mass and the individual cell sealed by the female. Each egg takes 22 days to develop from an egg to a full adult. She then goes on to construct more, similar cells containing eggs and pollen masses. During this time, before the first worker brood has emerged, containing only about five workers, the foundress queen frequently leaves the nest to find provisions to build the brood cells of the nest. These nest absences are accompanied by high risk of intraspecific usurpation. Once the brood is provisioned, the queen seals the nest synchronously with all other queens in the aggregation, and all above-ground activity ceases for three weeks.

Larvae from the earliest eggs are full grown and start pupation by the end of May in Central Europe (or much earlier in warmer climates), emerging from their cells by mid-June. For bees in cooler climates with shorter breeding seasons, these adults are all non-reproductive female workers, somewhat smaller than their mother. The original maternal female bee remains within the nest and guards the entrance to the burrow, now acting as a queen while her non-reproductive daughters act as workers; they go out foraging for food and help in the construction of new brood cells, in which the queen lays new eggs. For bees in warmer climates with longer breeding seasons, some of the female workers have reproductive capacity and can help breed up to two subsequent worker broods before the eventual gyne brood.

Males begin to emerge from the final brood of the season by the beginning of August in Central Europe, or May–June in the Mediterranean region. Several days later, reproductive females begin to emerge, as well, which are morphologically similar to their queen. During sunny weather, the nest aggregation becomes a lek and the males vie for territory on the ground. The males mate with the new reproductive females (from both their own and separate nests), although they do not attempt mating with the non-reproductive females. Impregnated females may continue to live in their mothers' nests, although it is thought that they only forage for their own food and do not contribute to the rest of the nest.

With the arrival of the colder autumn weather, the males and non-reproductive females die off, and the impregnated reproductive females go on to spend the winter in diapause and repeat the lifecycle the following year. The lifecycle is longer, with two successive broods of workers, in southern Europe. Soil temperature specifically has been linked to decreasing the overall length of the nesting cycle. Workers in warmer soil tend to require less time to provision a new brood, possibly because they have more active time each day.

== Behavior ==
=== Dominance hierarchies ===
L. malachurum colonies are monogynous. Although the queen coordinates the workers within the nest, the workers can exert pressures on the queen, as well. Because queens frequently are replaced through usurpation and queen turnover, the workers within a nest are less related to the queen than expected. As such, the workers are less likely to cooperate with the queen based on maximizing their own fitness. To get the workers to remain with the nest and continue to aid her own offspring, the queen often cedes reproduction to alien workers. These workers can produce males or gynes and have high rates of reproduction. They do not, however, overwinter, nor are they morphologically similar to a queen or gyne. The length of lifespan for the queens may be a factor that leads to more reproductive workers in southern climes that have longer breeding seasons; in northern climes, where the queen is generally alive for production of gynes, workers are less likely to be reproductive. In southern climes, where the queen frequently does not survive to gyne production, workers are more likely to be reproductive.

=== Communication and recognition ===
==== Male-female communication ====
Communication between males and females of L. malachurum is mediated using pheromones. Virginal queens attract males through a sex hormone that mated queens lack; thus, males are much more attracted to younger queens. The chemical distinctions between the pheromones released by virginal and mated queens are significant in terms of proportions of hydrocarbons and lactones. Whereas isopentenyl esters, unsaturated fatty acids, and hydrocarbons are far more abundant in the chemical makeup of a virginal queen's hormones, the old queen's hormones are more likely to be made up of largely macrocyclic lactones. This chemical distinction between virginal and old females allows males to distinguish between the two, thus enabling male choice in sexual partner. They are also capable of discriminating between familiar and unknown queens, and l generally are more attracted to queens of a foreign colony, which likely arose as an outbreeding mating strategy, which increases genetic diversity of the population and decreases the probability that the next generation would be subject to genetic disease.

==== Nest recognition ====
Because L. malachurum generally nests in aggregations of thousands of colonies within a small region, the ability of bees to recognize their own nests is crucial. Outside the entrances to the nest, guards are posted. These guards mark the nest entrances with Dufour's gland secretions to create olfactory cues to guide colony specific bees back to the nest. These secretions are largely made up of alkanes and alkenes. Bees of the species L. malachurum also rely on visual cues and landmarks to determine where their nests are, which they establish through orientation flights and continuously update through reorientation flights.

==== Nestmate discrimination ====
Nestmates are able to identify other nestmates using olfactory cues, as well. Chemical similarities, specifically in nonvolatile alkenes and alkanes, provide this cue. Notably, the component of discrimination is not based on kinship, but on shared nesting site, and individual bees of L. malachurum do not behave differently toward related nestmates and unrelated nestmates. In a given nest, the many different compounds mix together to form a gestalt odor that marks all of the members of the nest. This form of scent blending is found commonly among other members of Hymenoptera including certain bees, wasps, and ants. The gestalt bouquet of odors differs significantly in terms of chemical composition between different nests.

=== Usurpation ===
Queens frequently can be usurped by intraspecific gynes, because the creation of a new nest is a significant energy investment for gynes. The probability of a colony usurpation increases steadily as the season progresses, most likely because the probability of a gyne having the time and resources to found a new colony and produce new workers decreases. The increasing risk of usurpation may play a role in the small worker broods, because the queen ceases foraging and seals her nest in mid-May to protect from usurping gynes. Early nest closure has been favored by pressure from usurpation and has developed into an evolutionarily stable strategy. It might also explain why queens are highly aggressive toward other conspecific queens. In confrontations between foundresses and usurping gynes, female size is a significant determinant of outcome because it gives the queen or usurper a significant advantage. Although they have a physical advantage in usurpation, larger queens are more likely to found their own nests rather than usurp another.

=== Mating behavior ===
The nest aggregation of thousands of colonies that persists throughout the year becomes a lek mating system on warm summer days in the latter half of the breeding season (July through September). The daily operational sex ratio has far more males than females, which is common in a lek mating system and among other bees. The lek mating is a system in which a large group of males clusters at sites visited by females for mating. Males are attracted during mating by a mix of olfactory cues produced in multiple glandular sources from the female. Males seek out unrelated, unmated females; because females are only receptive for a short period following their emergence, males must seek out and find an unmated gyne before the large number of other males. Mating can occur either in the female's nest or on flowers. Queens can be polyandrous, but only rarely do they actually mate with multiple males. Most colonies arise from only one queen and one male.

=== Aggression ===
Aggression is commonly seen between conspecifics of all halictid bees; especially between usurper females, drawn out fights can occur that last for nearly a half-hour and result in damage to or loss of limbs and body parts. Guard bees of the L. malachurum species, which are workers that defend the nest, also demonstrate antagonistic behavior toward non-nestmate conspecifics, by orienting their stingers toward the intruders or blocking the entrance to the nest with their abdomens. They are able to discriminate between non-nestmates and nestmates, which they allow to pass with ease. Foragers, though, are either unable to discriminate between nestmate and non-nestmate conspecifics or are uninterested in pursuing aggression against non-nestmate conspecifics, so exhibit high levels of tolerance toward all conspecifics.

== Pollination ==
L. malachurum bees are polylectic, meaning that they collect pollen from a broad range of unrelated plant species. Although L. malachurum displays opportunism when selecting flowers from which to extract pollen, they will generally narrow their selection of pollen during a given collection period. The species demonstrates floral consistency, and generally only collects from one pollen source during a given pollen flight. The pollination behavior of L. malachurum may be useful for humans to cultivate and develop, because the bee has been implicated in pollinating species of plants that are commonly used by humans for food and for medication.

== Parasites ==
L. malachurum colonies are parasitized by the kleptoparasitic species of the genus Sphecodes. The bees of this genus have developed a strategy for invading the nest of host species that involves avoiding interaction with any host individuals. The parasites generally parasitize L. malachurum nests during the early spring when the foundress queens need to leave their nests unattended to forage. Other species enter guarded nests during the second brood cycle and kill the guard, as well all other present host individuals, before laying eggs in the brood cells. After oviposition, the parasite closes the brood cells to prevent the host female from returning and replacing the parasite eggs. Because the parasites in the genus Sphecodes parasitize a broad range of other bee species, few adaptations to the specific L. malachurum bee colonies exist.
