= Poor Valley Creek State Park =

Cancelled state park in Hawkins County, Tennessee

- Poor Valley Park
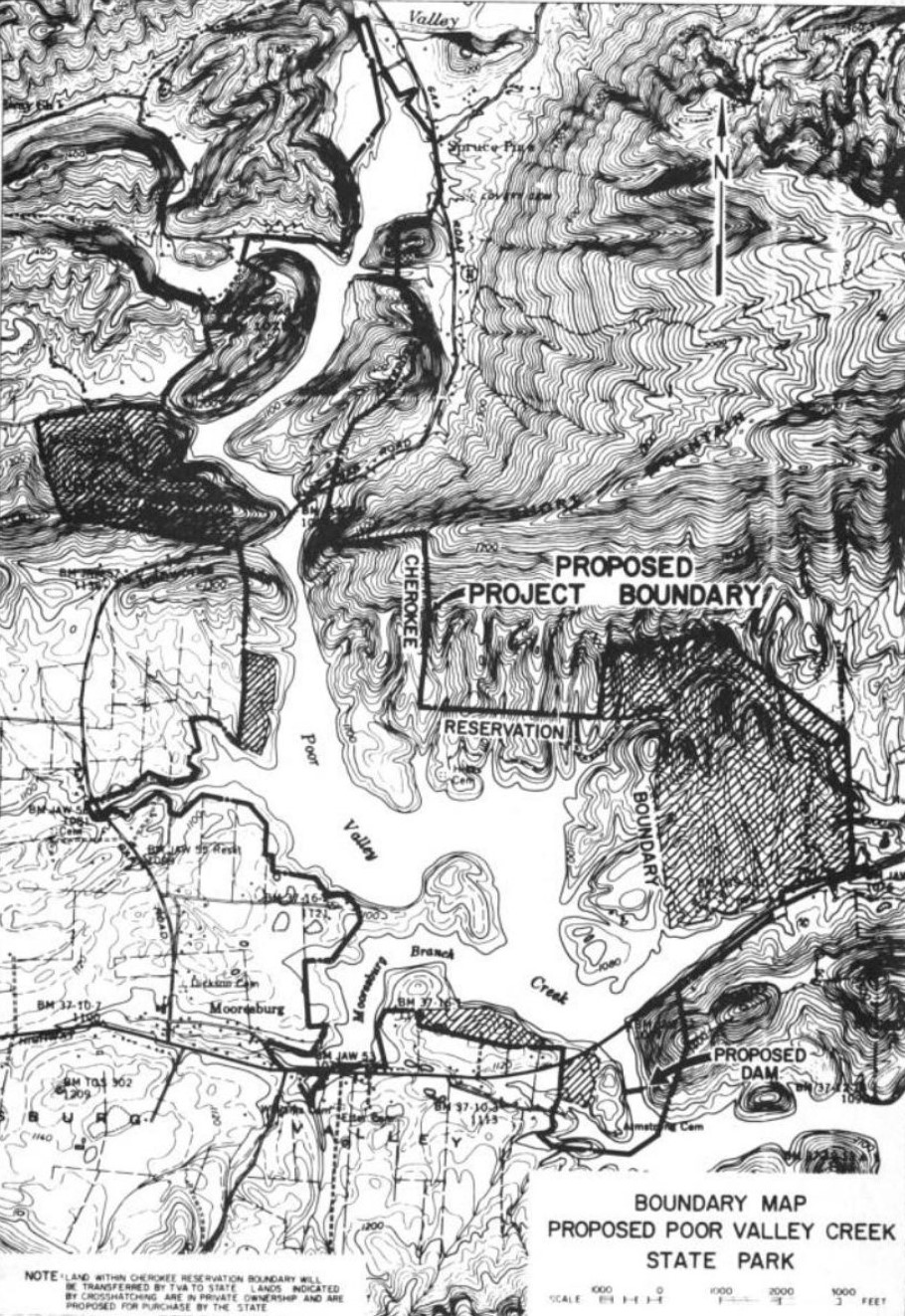
- A map of the proposed park by the Tennessee Valley Authority
- Interactive map of Poor Valley Creek State Park
- Type: State park
- Location: Hawkins County, Tennessee, United States
- Nearest town: Bean Station, Tennessee
- Coordinates: 36.355468°N 83.212907°W
- Area: 1,903 acres (7.70 km^{2})
- Operator: Tennessee Department of Environment and Conservation, Tennessee Valley Authority
- Visitors: 218,000 (in 1968 estimate)
- Status: Shelved

Poor Valley Creek State Park was a proposed state park in western Hawkins County, Tennessee, United States. It would have been located prominently near the Poor Valley Creek embayment of Cherokee Lake, an impoundment of the Holston River. The park was first planned in 1945, and shelved indefinitely following comments supporting "no action" on the project by state agencies in 1976.

== History ==
The origins of plans for a park in the Poor Valley region were first discussed around 1945, when Winfield Hale, the judge of Hawkins County and president of the county's chamber of commerce, suggested the idea of a public recreation area to G.L. Arsdall, who was the acting manager for the Tennessee Valley Authority (TVA) firm Norris-Cherokee Properties, which maintained land owned by the TVA obtained for the Cherokee and Norris hydroelectricity projects. Hale would continue suggesting the need for a state park in the Poor Valley vicinity when in 1949, he was contacted by James Pope, director of the TVA. Hale would learn that the TVA since 1941, had been planning the development of a public recreation area in the Poor Valley region and work for a lateral dam on the Poor Valley Creek embayment of Cherokee Lake was underway. The next year, Hale would head to Washington, D.C. for meetings with U.S. Senators Albert Gore, Sr. and Estes Kefauver supporting funding and efforts for a state park in Hawkins County.

In 1957, officials from the office of then Governor Frank Clement, and the Tennessee Department of Environment and Conservation (TDEC), which operates the Tennessee State Parks system, would begin discussions with Hawkins County leaders including state representative Omar Robinson of Rogersville, and start initial surveying and studies on-site for the Poor Valley State Creek Park project. In the following year, the Tennessee Wildlife Resources Agency (TWRA) would report that the Poor Valley site would be most suitable as a state park rather than a hunting preserve or nature refuge.

Throughout the 1960s, the park project would go through more studies and grant-writing when a major win for the park occurred in 1963, James Quillen would be elected as a congressman serving Tennessee's 1st congressional district, which represented Hawkins County. The Kingsport native would support the proposals for the park and federal funding for the TVA to construct the dam on Poor Valley Creek required to maintain it at a full capacity annually.

By the 1970s, the final planning and development work of the project would start, as the Tennessee General Assembly would vote to appropriate $50,000 in 1971 to the TDEC for initial operations of the park, equivalent to $397,494 in 2025. Investigations by the Kingsport Times-News would discover that this funding would never be spent by the TDEC. In May 1973, the TVA would sign an agreement with the Tennessee state government to complete the project, having the TVA pay 80% for the construction of the lateral dam, and transfer the land and water to the state at no cost while the state would support the cost and most oversight regarding the development of the park. In 1975, the TVA would complete its environmental impact statement (EIS) for the park and the dam. Around this time, the federal funding proposed by Congressman Quillen for the TVA to construct the dam would be deleted for the reportedly third time by the Office of Management and Budget (OMB) before the funding bill for TVA-related projects reached the United States Congress.

After the publication of the impact statement by the TVA, and influenced by both the completion of the nearby Panther Creek State Park in Hamblen County, and the deletion of dam construction funding by the OMB, the project would receive non-favorable feedback from the previously-supportive TDEC and TWRA, which both recommended in reaction the TVA’s EIS that "no action" be taken to complete and develop Poor Valley Creek State Park. With the loss of the necessary federal funding and unfavorable comments from the TDEC and TWRA, the project would be shelved indefinitely, with no action having been taken on the project since 1976. In 1987, portions of Short Mountain would be developed into a silica mining facility near the park site despite local controversy and opposition by residents, supporters of the state park project, and local and state government officials.

== Geographical setting ==
The proposed park would have been located on 1,903 acres surrounding the Poor Valley Creek watershed of Cherokee Lake in unincorporated Hawkins County near the community of Mooresburg. 1,468 of the 1,903 acres for the park would be protected forest under the ownership of the TVA, while the remaining 435 acres which consisted of privately owned agricultural land.

The Poor Valley Creek watershed is surrounded by forested shale-based mountain slopes in the Ridge-and-Valley Appalachians province, the highest being Short Mountain at 2,651 feet.

== Ecology ==
The Poor Valley Creek site was analyzed for ecological purposes in the TVA's EIS published in 1975. It was found to support a diverse array of vegetation and wildlife. In the site, most of the vegetation had existed prior to the impoundment of the creek by the TVA for the Cherokee Project. Over 36 species of trees were identified in the site, with most being cove, mixed, and upland hardwoods, and mixed pine.

On-site studies performed by the TVA revealed the prominence of bass, bluegill, shiner, crappie, darter, and carp fish species in upstream Poor Valley Creek and the embayment near Cherokee Lake. Birds known to have the site as a habitat include sandpiper, warbler, hawk, woodpecker, sparrow, and duck species. Mammal species spotted included opossum, skunk, squirrel, fox, raccoon, and deer. Amphibians and reptiles spotted included frog, turtle, snake, and salamander species.

== Recreation and facilities ==
The exact amenities and facilities that would have been offered at Poor Valley Creek State Park is unknown, but the state would agree to the construction and development of several recreational facilities following the 1973 agreement with the TVA. In the agreement, the state government would develop a marina, group lodge, an environmental interpretation center, lighted tennis courts and athletic ball-fields, hiking and mountain biking trails, horse stables, a trading post/concession center, and over 50 fully facilitated campsites and picnic areas.

A linear dam constructed by the TVA south of the site and the U.S. Route 11W bridges on the creek would have made the creek into a 543-acre reservoir fit for the proposed water-based amenities for the park.

Proposals once part of the park plan but were never used in the final plans included an 18-hole golf course, a hunting preserve, and an expanded hiking trail system on an extra 4,000 acres around Short Mountain.
