= Couchville Cedar Glade State Natural Area =

State natural area in Tennessee, US

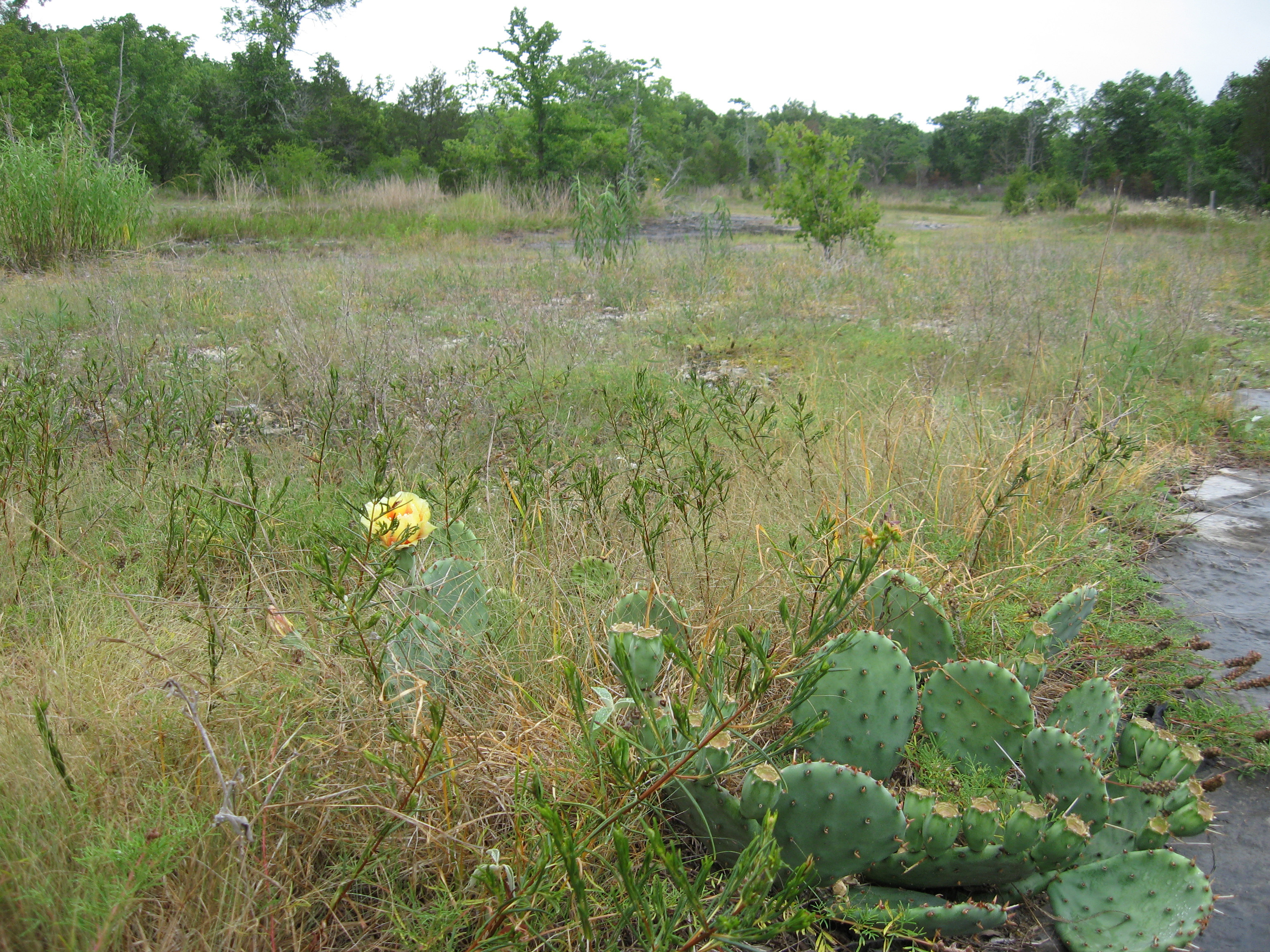

- Location within Tennessee
- Location: Davidson and Wilson Counties, Tennessee, USA
- Nearest city: Nashville, Tennessee
- Coordinates: 36°05′51″N 86°33′14″W
- Area: 140 acres (57 ha)
- Governing body: Tennessee Department of Environment & Conservation

Couchville Cedar Glade State Natural Area is a Class II Natural-Scientific state natural area located in Davidson and Wilson counties Tennessee. Its western boundary is contiguous with the eastern boundary of Long Hunter State Park. The park's name reflects its location near the now extinct inundated community of Couchville, Tennessee.

The 140 acres (57 ha) reservation is characterized by extensive bare rock intermixed with Eastern red cedars (Juniperus virginiana), grasses, wildflowers (including the Tennessee Coneflower, Echinacea tennesseensis) and associated wildlife along a mile long hiking trail looping through one of the most undisturbed examples of a cedar glade remaining in middle Tennessee.

== Park website ==
- Couchville Cedar Glade Class II Natural-Scientific State Natural Area
