= Tennessee Commissioner of Environment and Conservation =

Head of the Department of Environment and Conservation

The Tennessee Commissioner of Environment and Conservation is the head of the Department of Environment and Conservation of the U.S. state of Tennessee, which is responsible for environmental protection, conservation of natural resources, and management of state parks. The Commissioner is appointed by the Governor and is a member of the Governor's Cabinet, which meets at least once per month, or more often to the governor's liking. The current Commissioner is David W. Salyers.

== History ==
In 1953, former governor Jim Nance McCord became the Commissioner of Conservation for Governor Frank G. Clement during his first administration. Donald M. McSween was the Commissioner for Frank Clement during his second administration. E. Boyd Garrett was the Commissioner during the Buford Ellington administration, beginning in 1967. William L. Jenkins and Granville Hinton each served as Commissioner under Winfield Dunn. From 1975 to 1979, B.R. "Buck" Allison served as the Commissioner of Ray Blanton. Ann R. Tuck and Charles A. Howell, III served as Commissioner during the two terms of Lamar Alexander. J.W. Luna became the first to hold the title of Commissioner of Environment and Conservation under Ned McWherter. Milton H. Hamilton Jr. was Commissioner under Don Sundquist.
