= Tennessee Clean Water Network =

U.S. nonprofit organization

The Tennessee Clean Water Network
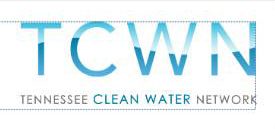
- Formation: 2000
- Type: Non-profit organization
- Purpose: TCWN empowers Tennesseans to exercise their right to clean water and healthy communities by fostering civic engagement, building partnerships and advancing, and when necessary enforcing, water policy for a sustainable future. TCWN is a 501(c)(3) not-for-profit corporation. Donations to the organization are tax-deductible.
- Headquarters: Knoxville, Tennessee
- Region served: Tennessee
- Interim Executive Director: Dana Wright
- Board President: Tony Dolle
- Website: www.tcwn.org

The Tennessee Clean Water Network is an environmental group located in the state of Tennessee in the United States whose principal focus has been the preserving the quality of the state's public water resources including its drinking water and its waterways.

In 2016 the group published a press release directed at the State of Tennessee's Department of Environment and Conservation Division of Water Resources, claiming that the division, under the direction of the state's governor, Bill Haslam, had shown a significant drop-off in the number of penalties for businesses committing clear acts of water pollution. The state issues a certain number of permits to businesses to pollute local water, and if those permit levels are exceeded, the state has the option to enforce a penalty, which it had largely decided not to do.

In 2014 the group announced plans to file a lawsuit against a Kingsport, Tennessee ammunition plant over its continued pollution of local drinking water.
