= Couchville, Tennessee =

- Unincorporated community
- Location within the state of Tennessee
- Coordinates: 36°05′52″N 86°33′19″W
- Country: United States
- State: Tennessee
- County: Davidson
- Established: before 1880
- ZIP code: 37076

Couchville, Tennessee was a community and U.S. Post Office founded on Stones River prior to 1880 in Davidson County, Tennessee. Couchville was inundated when J. Percy Priest Lake was formed by impounding Stones River in the mid-1960s. The community was roughly located 500 feet to the west of the current intersection of Hobson Pike and Couchville Pike in Mt. Juliet, Tennessee. The community's identity is preserved in the name of adjacent Couchville Cedar Glade State Natural Area.

== See also ==
- List of ghost towns in Tennessee
