= J.W. Luna =

Jones Wilson Luna, known as J.W. Luna, is an American lawyer who served successively under Tennessee Governor Ned McWherter as Commissioner of the Tennessee Department of Personnel, Commissioner of the Tennessee Department of Health and Environment, and Commissioner of the Tennessee Department of Environment and Conservation.

Luna is a graduate of Vanderbilt University, where he received a Bachelor of Arts degree in 1974, and the University of Tennessee, where he received a J.D. degree in 1976. Following law school, he worked as an assistant district attorney for nine years, prosecuting cases in Coffee, Warren, DeKalb and Van Buren Counties.

In 1987, he joined McWherter's administration as Commissioner of the Tennessee Department of Personnel. The following year he moved to the Tennessee Department of Health and Environment, where he served as commissioner until 1991, when a reorganization created the Department of Environment and Conservation and he became the first Commissioner of the new department, serving until McWherter left office in 1995.

Luna is now in the private practice of law in Nashville, Tennessee, specializing in governmental regulatory and environmental law.
