= Ross Creek Landing =

Golf course in Tennessee

Coordinates: 35.3834°N 87.9739°W

Ross Creek Landing is a golf course in middle Tennessee, located in rolling countryside in Wayne County along the banks of the Tennessee River.

== Golf course ==
Ross Creek Landing is a par 72 course designed by Jack Nicklaus. It measures more than 7000 yards from the back tees. There are five sets of tees on every hole to allow golfers of differing abilities to enjoy this course. During the construction and design of this course, Nicklaus made some adjustments to shorten two of the par fives so that the golfer may have the opportunity to reach the green in two shots. He also designed the par 4 fourth hole into a 'drivable' par 4 that offers a variety of 'go for it' and 'lay up' options.

The course offers a variety of wooded and meadow golf holes. Oak, Hickory, Hackberry, Cedar and even some Cypress line the fairways. Marshes and ponds have been created to benefit the environment and provide strategy on some of the golf holes. During the construction of the course, special efforts were made to preserve stream corridors and existing woods and meadows. New grades for the golf course were carefully tied into these existing features so that it appears that the course has always been here.

== History ==
Ross Creek Landing was built as a state park golf course called Bear Trace at Ross Creek Landing, the fifth in a series of Nicklaus-designed golf courses located in Tennessee state parks. The state Department of Environment and Conservation sold the property in 2008 after experiencing annual operating losses of about $0.5 million. The sale price of $2.15 million was reported to represent a loss to the state of more than $2.6 million.
