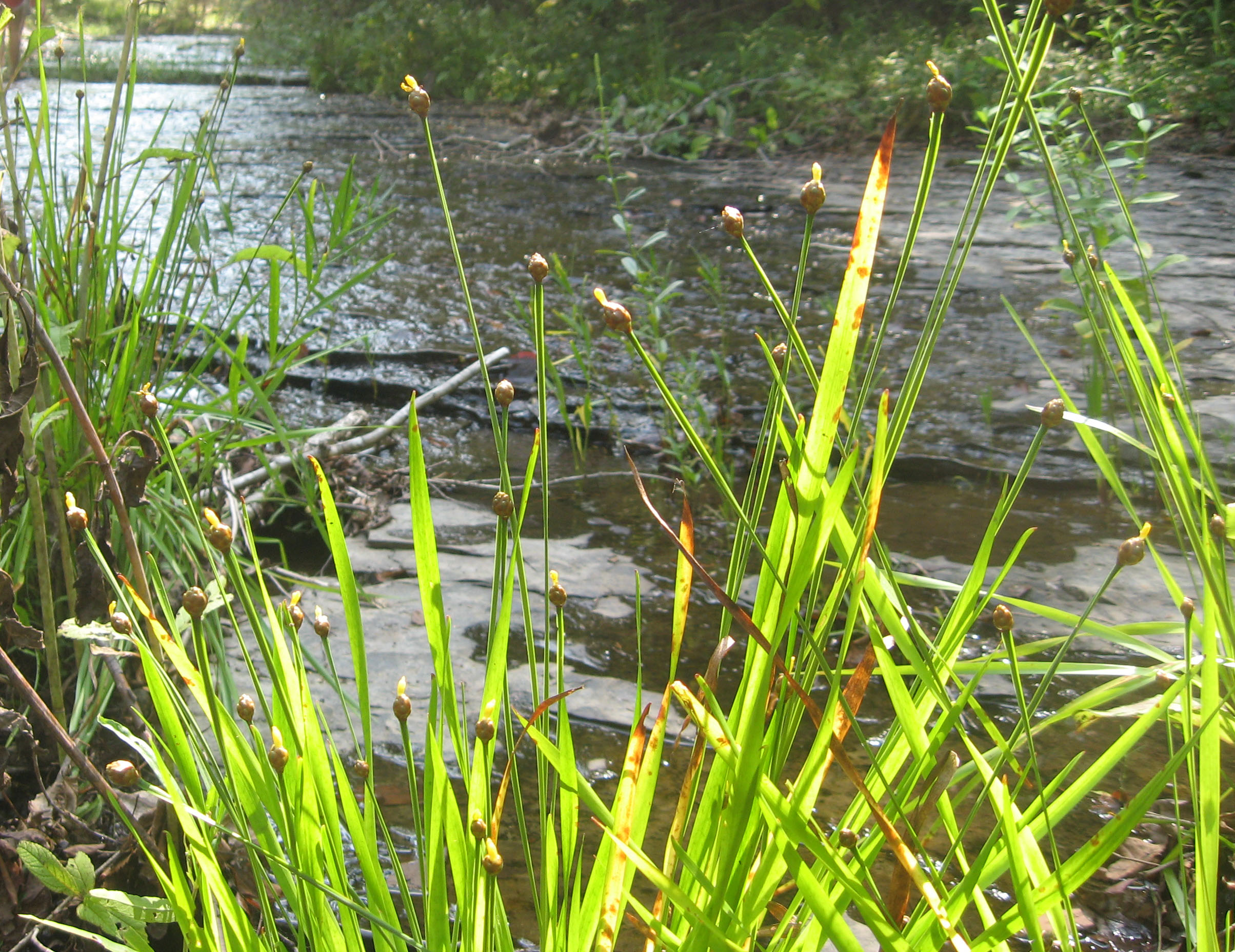

Conservation status
- Imperiled (NatureServe)

Scientific classification
- Kingdom: Plantae
- Clade: Tracheophytes
- Clade: Angiosperms
- Clade: Monocots
- Clade: Commelinids
- Order: Poales
- Family: Xyridaceae
- Genus: Xyris
- Species: X. tennesseensis

Binomial name
- Xyris tennesseensis Kral

= Xyris tennesseensis =

Tennessee yellow-eyed grass

Species of yelloweyed grass

Xyris tennesseensis is a rare species of flowering plant in the family Xyridaceae known by the common name Tennessee yellow-eyed grass. It is native to a small section of the Southeastern United States, including parts of the states of Alabama, Georgia, and Tennessee. A federally listed endangered species, it is threatened by the loss and degradation of its habitat.

Xyris tennesseensis is a perennial herb growing 30 to 70 centimetres (12 to 28 in) tall. The branching stem is bulbous and fleshy at the base. The leaves are long and narrow and originate at the swollen stem base. They are up to 45 centimeters (18 inches) long and not more than a centimeter (0.4 inch) 45/2.5 wide. They are flat but sometimes twisted, and green with reddish or pink bases. The inflorescence at the tip of the stem is a cone-like spike covered in tough brown scales. The flowers within are pale yellow.

Each spike generally produces one flower per day, or sometimes two. The flower opens for a short time in the late morning and closes by mid-afternoon. Blooming occurs in August and September. The plants are pollinated by insects, especially the sweat bee Lasioglossum zephyrus, which has been observed opening the buds to remove pollen before the flower opens, as to ensure it has first and exclusive access to the pollen.

This plant grows in open areas in wet habitat types such as streambanks, seeps, fens, and wet meadows. The soils are thin and cover calcareous rock. The plant grows in neutral to basic soils, unlike other Xyris species, which usually occur in acidic soils.

There are 16 to 25 populations of the plant in three US states. Some have been recently extirpated, others are declining, and several others are in danger of destruction. Threats to the species include habitat destruction during timber operations, including clearcutting. Timber companies own much of the land occupied by the plant in Tennessee. Removal of stands of trees causes the soil to dry, making it inhospitable for this wetland endemic plant. Road construction and maintenance, including herbicide application, is a threat.

The plant requires open, sunny habitat for germination and growth, and it is threatened by the encroachment of large and woody vegetation in some areas. Proper land management includes the clearing of brush and the removal of exotic plant species such as Nepal grass (Microstegium vimineum).

== Interactions with other species ==
Flowers of Xyris tennesseensis are visited by the primitively social sweat bee, Lasioglossum zephyrum. This bee is known to force open the plant's flowers, granting the bee priority access to the pollen.
