= Lasioglossum clarum =

Scientific classification
- Domain: Eukaryota
- Kingdom: Animalia
- Phylum: Arthropoda
- Class: Insecta
- Order: Hymenoptera
- Family: Halictidae
- Tribe: Halictini
- Genus: Lasioglossum
- Species: L. clarum

Binomial name
- Lasioglossum clarum (Nurse, 1902)

Species of bee

Lasioglossum clarum, also known as the Lasioglossum (Ctenomia) clarum, is a species of bee in the genus Lasioglossum, of the family Halictidae.
