= Milton H. Hamilton Jr. =

American politician (1932–2008)

Member of the Tennessee Senate from the 24th district
- In office January 7, 1969 – January 14, 1997
- Succeeded by: Roy Herron

Member of the Tennessee House of Representatives
- In office January 4, 1965 – January 7, 1969
- Preceded by: Milton H. Hamilton
- Succeeded by: Ned McWherter

Personal details
- Born: Milton Hugh Hamilton Jr. September 8, 1932 Obion County, Tennessee, U.S.
- Died: September 5, 2008 (aged 75) Nashville, Tennessee, U.S.
- Party: Republican
- Other political affiliations: Democratic (until 1995)
- Education: Memphis State University; Murray State University (BA)

Milton Hugh Hamilton Jr. (September 8, 1932 – September 5, 2008) was an American politician who served in both houses of the Tennessee General Assembly and was majority leader of the Tennessee State Senate and Tennessee Commissioner of Environment and Conservation.

== Early life ==
Hamilton was born in Obion County, Tennessee, in 1932. He was educated in the Obion County public schools. He attended Memphis State University (now the University of Memphis) and was graduated with the B.A. degree from Murray State University, where he participated in the ROTC program, in 1955. He immediately afterward fulfilled his commitment to the United States Army, spending two years on active duty as a second lieutenant before being honorably discharged in 1957, although he remained in the Tennessee Army National Guard until 1977.

== Early career ==
Hamilton's first elected office was service on the Union City, Tennessee Board of Education. In 1964, he was elected to the Tennessee House of Representatives, where his father had previously served, as a Democrat. Hamilton served two terms in the State House.

== State senator ==
In 1968, Hamilton was elected to the Tennessee Senate from District 24, representing much of the northern part of West Tennessee. He served in an increasingly important series of positions on committees and in party leadership posts, culminating with his selection as majority leader in 1977, a position which he was to hold for 10 years.

In 1987, a rebellion within the Democratic Caucus began over the largely conservative leadership and style of Senate Speaker and Lieutenant Governor of Tennessee John S. Wilder, a close Hamilton friend and ally, which resulted in the nomination by the Democrats in the 1987 organizational session of the legislature of Riley Darnell of Clarksville, Tennessee, for Lieutenant Governor and Speaker. However, Hamilton led a faction of eight other Democratic senators who remained loyal to Wilder, and along with unanimous support from the Republican senators, this coalition voted to retain Wilder. The nine dissident Democrats were then dismissed from the Democratic caucus and reorganized as their own group, which they styled the "New Democratic Caucus", with Hamilton as their leader. Hamilton and his allies maintained some positions of leadership in the Senate, with others being filled by Republicans. Hamilton chaired the all-important Calendar Committee, and remained on other influential committees, most notably Ways and Means.

While in the state senate Hamilton was very active in the National Conference of State Legislatures. He was also very active in the state's conservation efforts with regard to Reelfoot Lake, which was located in his district and served as an important source of tourism as well as an important aquatic and wildlife resource.

In 1994 Republican Don Sundquist was elected governor of Tennessee and the Republican representation in the state senate increased to 15, just two short of a majority. On September 15, 1995, Hamilton and another Democratic senator who had also been a traditional Wilder ally made the decision to switch parties, giving the Republicans their first majority in the Tennessee Senate since Reconstruction, and Hamilton again became majority leader, although now of the other party. However, the Republican majority was short-lived as Hamilton did not choose to run for reelection in 1996, and the senate reverted to Democratic control.

== Commissioner ==
In 1997, shortly after his state senate term ended, Sundquist named Hamilton to his Cabinet as Commissioner of Environment and Conservation. Hamilton seemed to relish this position, serving until the end of the Sundquist Administration in January 2003. Hamilton implemented a system of user fees at many state parks to help offset their operating expenses; this program was frozen upon the inauguration of Phil Bredesen as governor.

== Personal life ==
Hamilton was a Methodist. He was married to the former Dale White. The couple had three children, and five grandchildren. Both Hamiltons were members of several fraternal and service organizations, including the American Legion, the Masons, the Knights Templar, the Shriners, and the Obion County Chamber of Commerce. He also served on the board of trustees of the Southern College of Optometry.

Hamilton died on September 5, 2008, in Nashville after a long illness.
