= Long Hunter State Park =

State park in Tennessee, United States

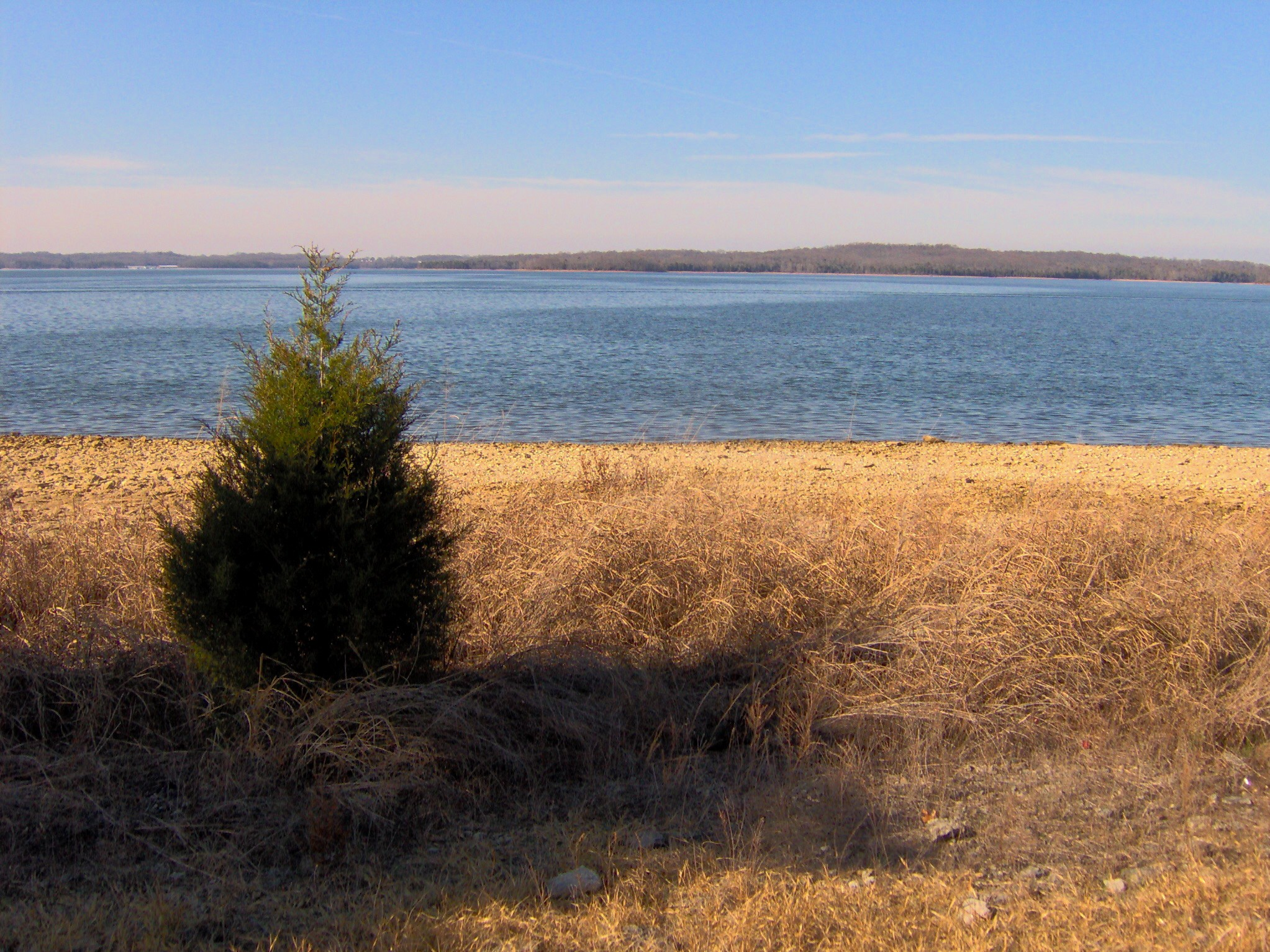
- J. Percy Priest Lake
- Interactive map of Long Hunter State Park
- Type: Tennessee State Park
- Location: Hermitage, Hermitage, Tennessee
- Coordinates: 36°05′33″N 86°33′20″W
- Operator: TDEC
- Website: Long Hunter State Park

Long Hunter State Park is a state park in Davidson County and Rutherford County, Tennessee, located in the southeastern United States. The park is mostly situated along the eastern shores of Percy Priest Lake, an artificial lake created by an impoundment of the Stones River.

Long Hunter State Park comprises three lake sections — Baker's Grove in the north, Couchville at the center, and Bryant Grove to the south. All three sections are connected by narrow strips of land. The park also manages Sellars Farm, a state archaeological area near Lebanon to the east.

== Geographical setting ==
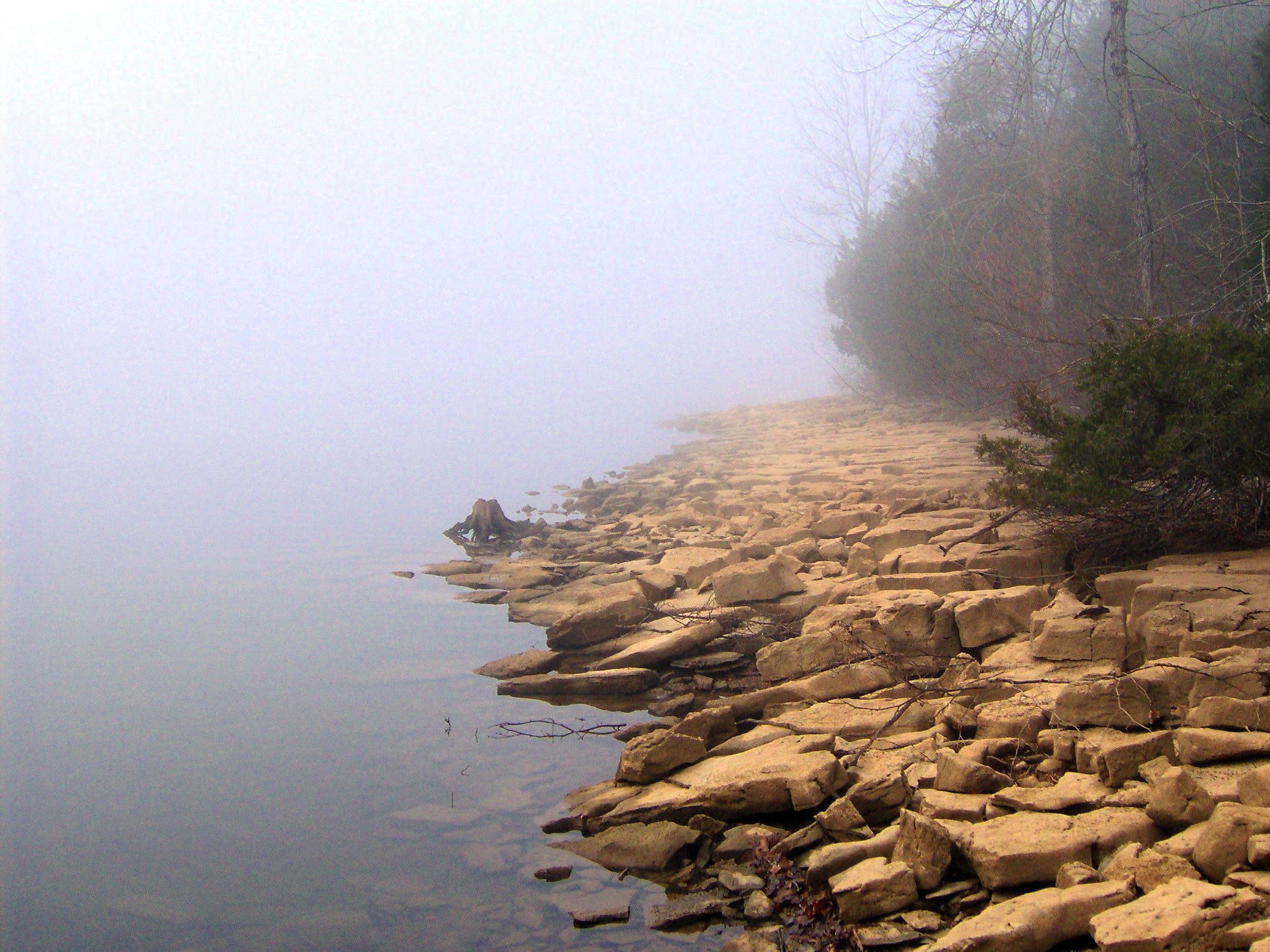
The shore of J. Percy Priest Lake near Bakers Grove, before the morning fog has lifted

The West Fork of Stones River flows northward from its source in the hills around Rock Springs, passes through Murfreesboro and Stones River National Battlefield, and merges with the East Fork of Stones River near Smyrna. The East Fork flows westward from its source atop Short Mountain, at the edge of the Highland Rim, and passes north of Murfreesboro. The confluence of these two rivers forms Stones River proper, and marks the southern extreme of J. Percy Priest Lake.

Stones River's J. Percy Priest Lake impoundment stretches for approximately 22 miles (35 km) between the confluence of the West Fork and East Fork to the south and the J. Percy Priest Dam near Donelson to the north. Downstream from the dam, Stones River winds its way through a series of bends toward its mouth along the Cumberland River, just east of Nashville. Long Hunter State Park is officially located in Hermitage, a suburb of Nashville.

Tennessee State Route 171 follows Mount Juliet Road south from Interstate 40 to the park's boundary. The two roads then split, with TN-171 continuing west along Hobson Pike to the park's Couchville section, and Mount Juliet Road (now South Mount Juliet Road) continuing south to the park's Bryant Grove section. Granny Wright Road, which intersects TN-171 just north of its split with Mount Juliet Road, accesses the Volunteer Trailhead and the park's Bakers Grove section.

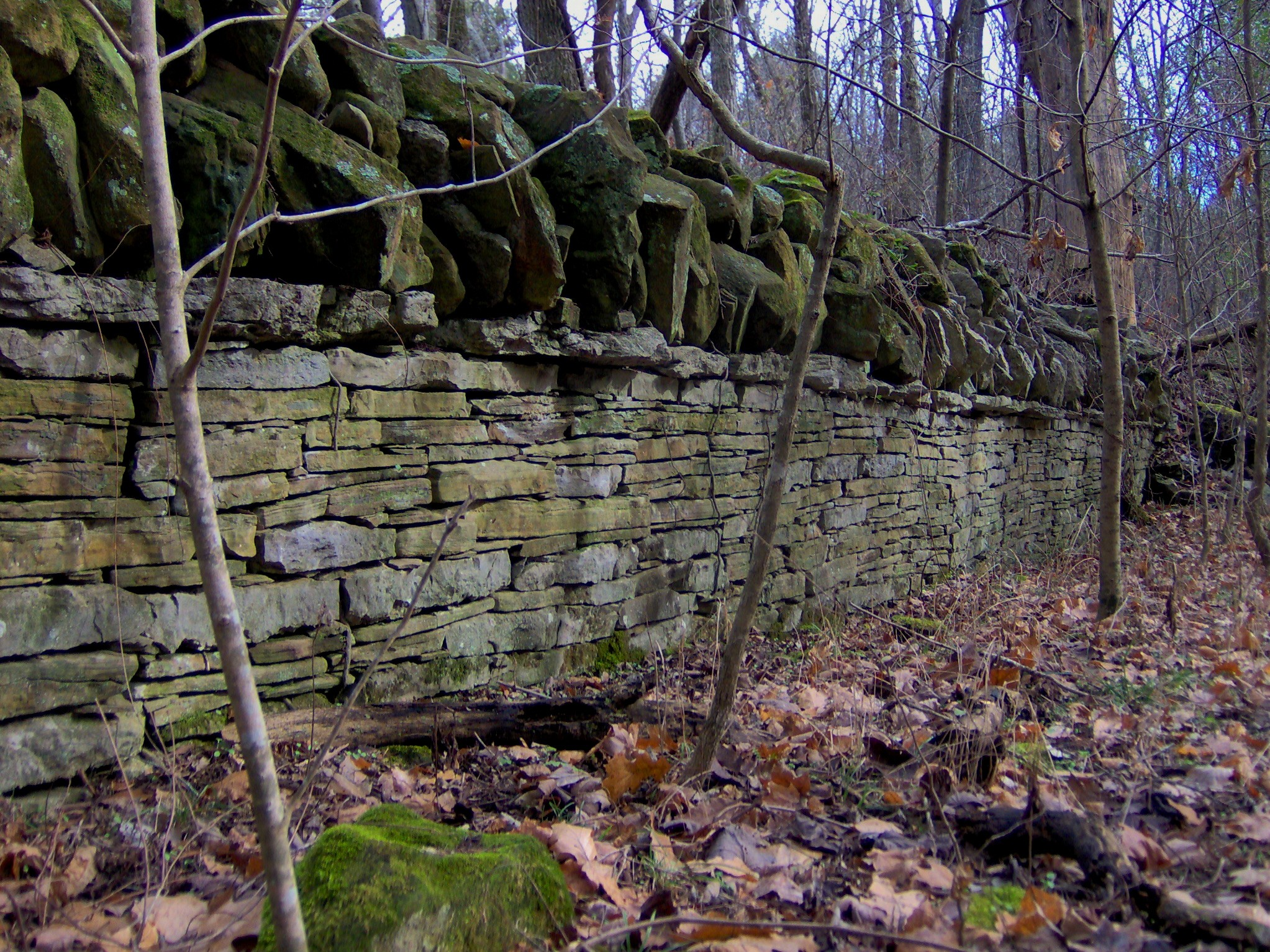
An old stone property wall near the end of the Volunteer Trail

== History ==
Native Americans were hunting in the Stones River Basin as early as 12,000 years ago, as evidenced by flint tools found on the grounds of Long Hunter State Park. The Nashville Basin is full of evidence of Paleo-Indian habitation, including Clovis points and a mastodon kill site in Williamson County, several miles west of Stones River on the other side of Nashville. A fortified Mississippian-era village was located near Lebanon at Sellars Farm, the site of which is now maintained by Long Hunter State Park. The Sellars Farm site was occupied between A.D. 1000–1300, and included a series of "platform" mounds and a central plaza.

Among the first Euro-Americans to explore the Nashville Basin were small groups of hunters known as long hunters. Long hunters had arrived in the region by the 1760s, typically following the Cumberland River valley from Virginia. The term "long hunter" referred to the relatively lengthy period of time (usually 6–18 months) a typical long hunt lasted. Most long hunters initially sought animal furs for sale back in Virginia, although later long hunters were employed as surveyors. Stones River, upon which Long Hunter State Park is situated, is named for Uriah Stone, a long hunter who allegedly had all of his furs stolen by a French companion while hunting along the river in 1767. Geographical and topographical information gathered by long hunters would later be invaluable to the Nashville area's first settlers.

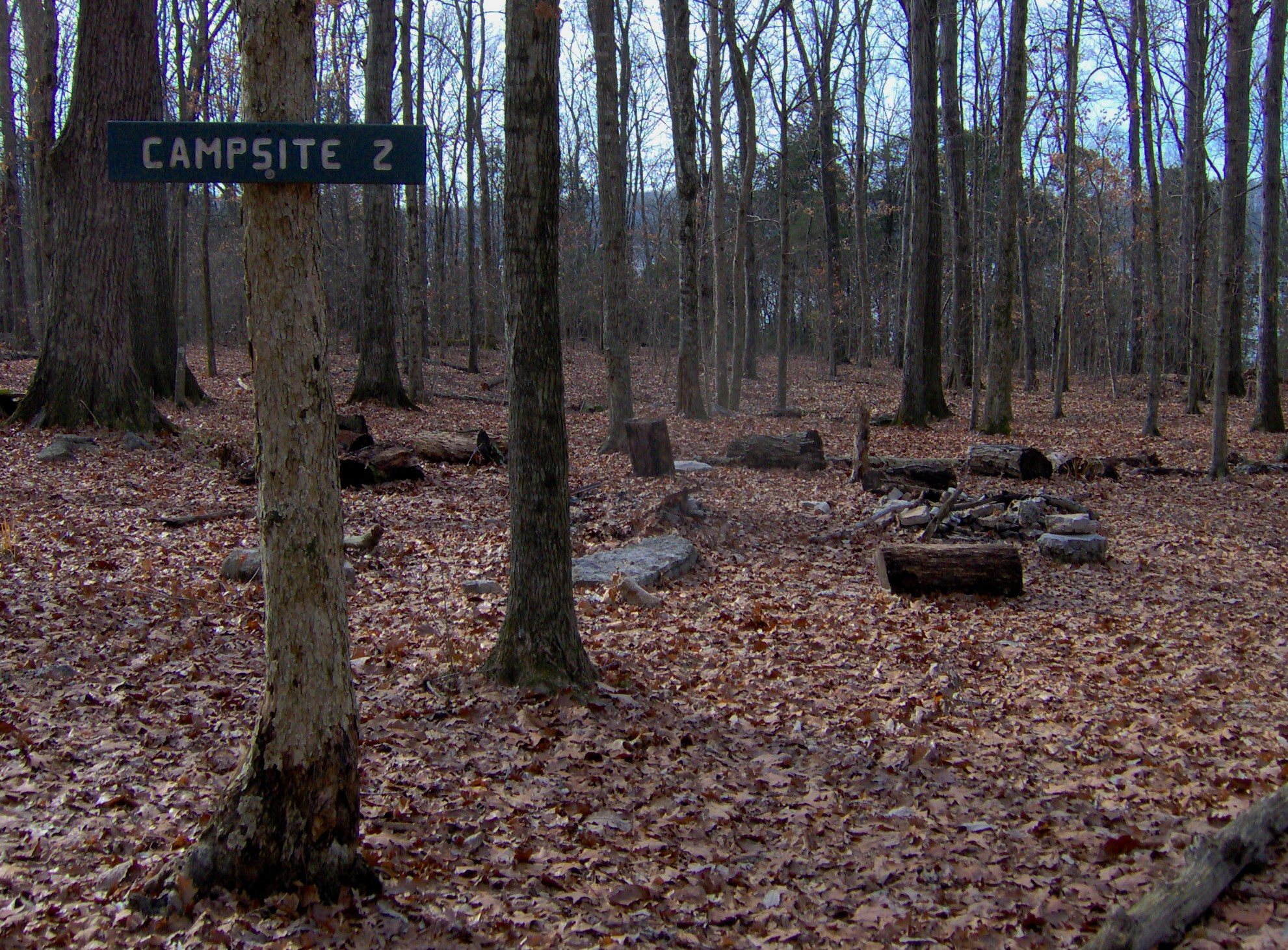
Campsite 2, the end of the Volunteer Trail

After the Cherokee ceded the Stones River area to the United States in 1805, settlers began to arrive in large numbers. Among the first to settle at what is now Long Hunter State Park were Sherrod Bryant and his son, Henderson, who were living in the valley by 1820. The Bryants, who were the namesake for Bryant Grove, were one of the wealthiest African American families in the state by the time of Sherrod's death in 1854. Other early settlers included the Couch family, who operated a store and river crossing just north of Bryant Grove.

In 1963, largely due to the demand for flood control along the volatile Stones River, the United States Army Corps of Engineers began construction on Stewart's Ferry Dam near Donelson. The dam — which was renamed for Congressman James Percy Priest (1900–1956) — was completed in 1968. The impoundment of the river forced water to back up through underground channels, leading to the formation of Couchville Lake, the small lake situated near the center of the park. In 1972, the Corps of Engineers leased 2,400 acres (9.7 km^{2}) of land on the east shore of the reservoir to the state of Tennessee for the formation of a state park. Long Hunter State Park officially opened in 1978.

The Sellars Mound site, which had been excavated by Peabody Museum curator Frederic Putnam in the late 1870s, was added to the National Register of Historic Places in 1972 and purchased by the state of Tennessee in 1974. In the late 1990s, the Friends of Sellars Farm State Archaeological Area was formed by volunteers who began promoting the site and offering tours. The site became a satellite of Long Hunter State Park in 2004.

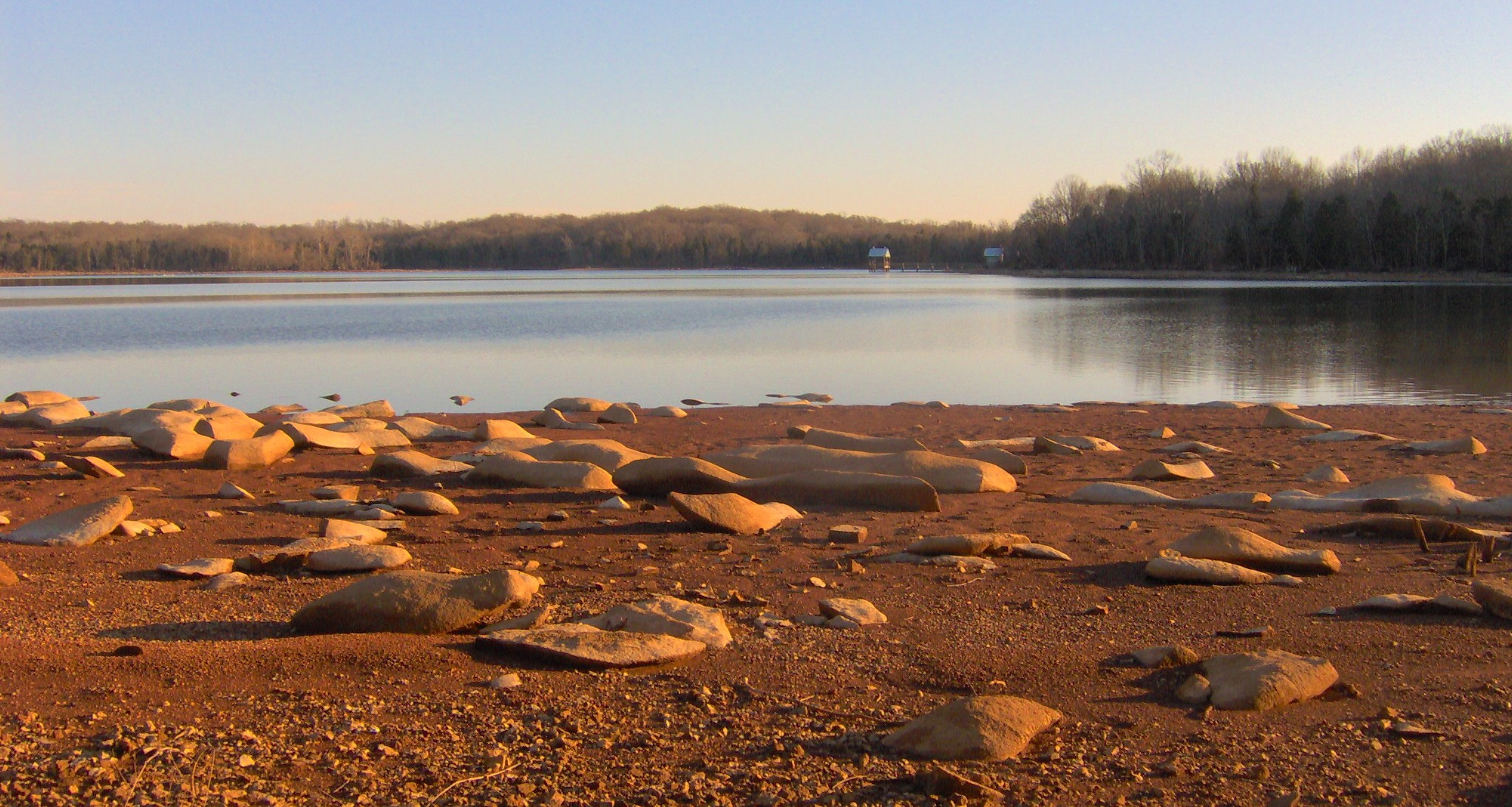
Couchville Lake

== The park today ==
Long Hunter State Park consists of approximately 2,600 acres (11 km^{2}) managed by the Tennessee Department of Environment and Conservation. The park includes two boat launch ramps on J. Percy Priest Lake, several miles of hiking trails, several group campsites and one backcountry campsite, a meeting facility, and a visitor center. Non-motorized boats are allowed on Couchville Lake.

The 5.5-mile (8.9 km) Volunteer Trail follows the lakeshore, connecting the Couchville and Bakers Grove sections. Two back country campsites are located at the end of the trail. A flat, paved trail circles Couchville Lake (which is not connected by surface water to Percy Priest Lake), and includes a 300-foot (91 m) bridge spanning the eastern end of the lake. The Jones Mill Trail, in the Bryant Grove section, leads to the top of Bald Knob, a clear hilltop that overlooks J. Percy Priest Lake.
