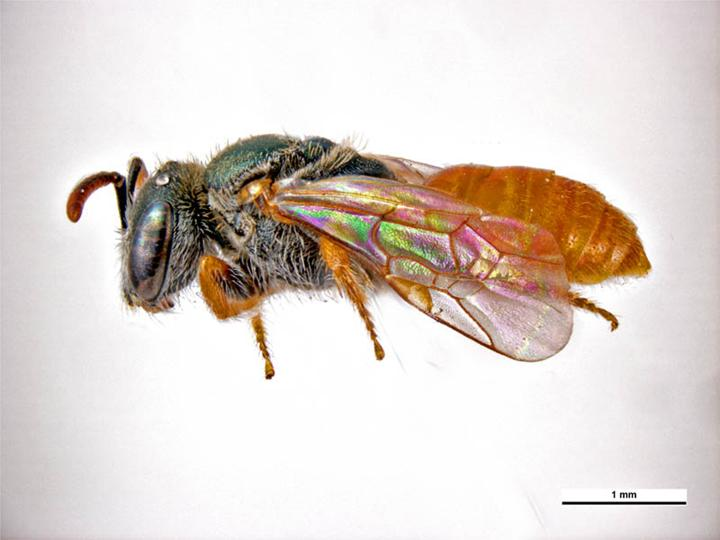
- Female
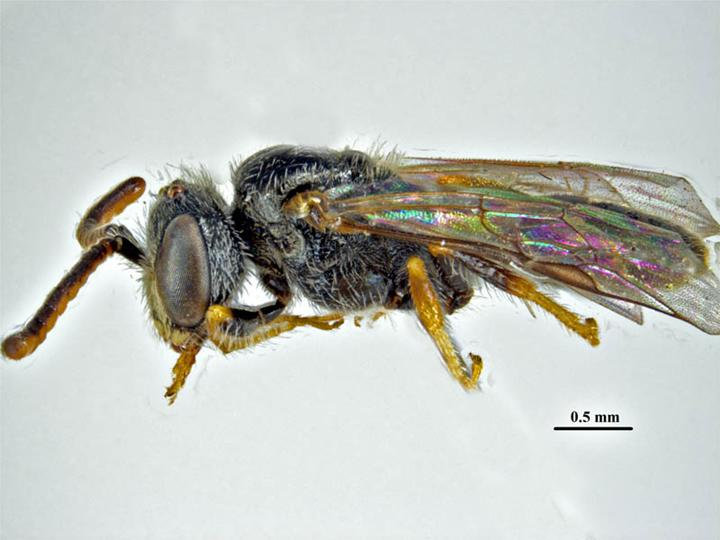
- Male

Scientific classification
- Kingdom: Animalia
- Phylum: Arthropoda
- Clade: Pancrustacea
- Class: Insecta
- Order: Hymenoptera
- Family: Halictidae
- Genus: Lasioglossum
- Species: L. erythrurum

Binomial name
- Lasioglossum erythrurum (Cockerell, 1914)

Synonyms
- Halictus erythrurus Cockerell, 1914; Halictus cyclognathus Cockerell, 1914; Halictus rufotinctus Cockerell, 1915; Halictus forticornis Cockerell, 1916; Halictus erythrurus atrocyaneus Cockerell, 1918; Halictus basilucens Cockerell, 1923; Halictus erythrurus maiusculus Rayment, 1930; Halictus suberythrurus Rayment, 1935

= Lasioglossum erythrurum =

Species of bee

Lasioglossum erythrurum, or Lasioglossum (Chilalictus) erythrurum, is a species of bee in the family Halictidae and subfamily Halictinae. It is endemic to Australia. It was described by British-American entomologist Theodore Dru Alison Cockerell in 1914.

== Description ==
Female body length is about 5 mm. Integumental colouration is mainly black and dark olive-green, with reddish markings, the abdomen chestnut-red.

== Distribution and habitat ==
The species occurs across much of central and southern Australia. Type localities include Brisbane and Bribie Island in Queensland; Croydon and Balmoral in Victoria; and Kalamunda and Perth in Western Australia.

== Behaviour ==
The adults are flying mellivores. They have sedentary larvae. Flowering plants visited by the bees include Acacia, Amyema, Angophora, Anthocercis, Aotus, Atalaya, Baeckea, Boronia, Brachychiton, Bursaria, Calytrix, Carpobrotus, Crotalaria, Daviesia, Dichopogon, Dicrastylis, Dillwynia, Disphyma, Eremophila, Eucalyptus, Goodenia, Grevillea, Alectryon, Hibbertia, Jacksonia, Leptospermum, Leucopogon, Melaleuca, Myoporum, Pittosporum, Prostanthera, Pultenaea, Santalum, Schinus, Senecio, Solanum, Syzygium, Thryptomene, Tristaniopsis, Wahlenbergia, Westringia and Xanthorrhoea species.

Dorsal view
