= Tennessee Department of Environment and Conservation =

Agency of the government of Tennessee, US

Agency overview
- Jurisdiction: State of Tennessee
- Headquarters: James K. Polk State Office Building; Nashville, Tennessee 37243
- Agency executive: David Salyers, P.E., Commissioner
- Website: https://tdec.tn.gov/

The Tennessee Department of Environment and Conservation (TDEC) is a Cabinet-level agency first created in 1937 within the government of the U.S. state of Tennessee, headed by the Tennessee Commissioner of Environment and Conservation.

== History ==
The Department of Conservation was first created in 1937 by the State Government Reorganization Act of 1937. All areas used for state parks, monuments, and recreation were brought under a Division of Parks within the department later that year. For a short while in the late 1950s and early 1960s the department existed as the Department of Conservation and Commerce, but it was soon split, with the Department of Conservation regaining its name. The modern TDEC was created in 1991, with programs in the Department of Health and Environment shifted into the new department.

== Tasks and organization ==
TDEC is legally responsible for the protection of Tennessee's air, water, and soil quality.

As of 2006, the department had at least fourteen divisions: the Division of Air Pollution Control, the Division of Archaeology, the Division of Geology, the Division of Ground Water Protection, the Division of Internal Audit, the Division of Natural Heritage, the Division of Radiological Health, the Division of Remediation, the Division of Solid and Hazardous Waste Management, the Division of Underground Storage Tanks, the Division of Water Pollution Control, the Division of Water Supply, the Recreational Services Division, and the Department of Energy Oversight Division. The department also manages Tennessee's state parks and the Tennessee Historical Commission. According to the Gubernatorial Papers housed at the Tennessee State Library and Archives in Nashville, the department once had a Hotel & Restaurant Division, which currently is managed by the Department of Tourist Development.

== Commissioners, since inception ==
The first commissioner of TDEC was J.W. Luna, who served under Governor Ned Ray McWherter. Don Dills and Milton H. Hamilton Jr. were commissioners during the administration of Governor Don Sundquist. Jim Fyke held the position under Governor Phil Bredesen. The current commissioner is David W. Salyers, who was appointed in 2019 by Governor Bill Lee.

== Reception ==
In 2016 the environmental watchdog group, the Tennessee Clean Water Network, published a press release directed at the department's Division of Water Resources, claiming that the division, under the direction of the state's governor, had shown a significant drop-off in the number of penalties for businesses committing clear acts of water pollution. The state issues a certain number of permits to businesses to pollute local water, and if those permit levels are exceeded, the state has the option to enforce a penalty, which it had largely decided not to do.

== See also ==
- Climate change in Tennessee
