= National Register of Historic Places listings in White County, Tennessee =

Location of White County in Tennessee

This is a list of the National Register of Historic Places listings in White County, Tennessee.

This is intended to be a complete list of the properties and districts on the National Register of Historic Places in White County, Tennessee, United States. Latitude and longitude coordinates are provided for many National Register properties and districts; these locations may be seen together in a map.

There are 12 properties and districts listed on the National Register in the county.

Contents: Counties in Tennessee
Anderson – Bedford – Benton – Bledsoe – Blount – Bradley – Campbell – Cannon – Carroll – Carter – Cheatham – Chester – Claiborne – Clay – Cocke – Coffee – Crockett – Cumberland – Davidson – Decatur – DeKalb – Dickson – Dyer – Fayette – Fentress – Franklin – Gibson – Giles – Grainger – Greene – Grundy – Hamblen – Hamilton – Hancock – Hardeman – Hardin – Hawkins – Haywood – Henderson – Henry – Hickman – Houston – Humphreys – Jackson – Jefferson – Johnson – Knox – Lake – Lauderdale – Lawrence – Lewis – Lincoln – Loudon – Macon – Madison – Marion – Marshall – Maury – McMinn – McNairy – Meigs – Monroe – Montgomery – Moore – Morgan – Obion – Overton – Perry – Pickett – Polk – Putnam – Rhea – Roane – Robertson – Rutherford – Scott – Sequatchie – Sevier – Shelby – Smith – Stewart – Sullivan – Sumner – Tipton – Trousdale – Unicoi – Union – Van Buren – Warren – Washington – Wayne – Weakley – White – Williamson – Wilson

This National Park Service list is complete through NPS recent listings posted May 29, 2026.

== Current listings ==
	Name on the Register	Image	Date listed	Location	City or town	Description
1	Cherry Creek Mound		December 15, 1978 (#78002648)	Address Restricted	Key	
2	Community Building	Community Building	May 20, 2002 (#02000085)	5 W. Maple St. 35°55′30″N 85°27′53″W	Sparta	Now known as "Liberty Hall," home to an American Legion order
3	Great Falls Hydroelectric Station	Great Falls Hydroelectric Station	July 5, 1990 (#90001004)	Off U.S. Route 70 at mile 91.1 on the Caney Fork; 35°48′07″N 85°37′19″W	Rock Island	Extends into Warren County
4	Indian Cave Petroglyphs		December 14, 1978 (#78002649)	Address Restricted	Onward	
5	Nashville, Chattanooga and St. Louis Railway Section House	Nashville, Chattanooga and St. Louis Railway Section House	July 6, 2011 (#11000421)	9479 Crossville Hwy. 35°57′03″N 85°18′30″W	DeRossett	1900s-era railroad section house; now home to the Bon Air Historical Society Museum
6	Ravencroft Mine		July 21, 2015 (#15000449)	Glade Creek Rd. 35°59′02″N 85°17′24″W	Sparta vicinity	
7	Sparta Electric Building	Sparta Electric Building	March 25, 1993 (#93000238)	S. Main St. 35°55′22″N 85°27′52″W	Sparta	Located at the corner of S. Main and Young streets
8	Sparta Hydroelectric Station		April 20, 1990 (#90000306)	State Route 111 at the Calfkiller River; 35°54′45″N 85°28′34″W	Sparta	
9	Sparta Nashville, Chattanooga and St. Louis Railroad Depot	Sparta Nashville, Chattanooga and St. Louis Railroad Depot	December 7, 1992 (#92001658)	Junction of Depot and Clark Sts. 35°56′14″N 85°28′18″W	Sparta	
10	Sparta Residential Historic District	Sparta Residential Historic District	October 28, 1991 (#91001586)	Roughly bounded by N. Main, College, Everett, and Church Sts. 35°55′43″N 85°27′49″W	Sparta	On May 8, 2019 the boundary of the historic district was increased to include the home at 8 East College Street.
11	Sparta Rock House	Sparta Rock House	August 14, 1973 (#73001856)	3 miles east of Sparta on U.S. Route 70; 35°55′13″N 85°24′13″W	Sparta vicinity	Mid-19th century toll house and stagecoach stop; maintained as a state historic site
12	Sperry-Smith House	Sperry-Smith House	November 15, 1996 (#96001357)	121 E. Maple St. 35°55′28″N 85°27′42″W	Sparta	

== Former listings ==
	Name on the Register	Image	Date listed	Date removed	Location	City or town	Description
1	Jesse Lincoln House	Jesse Lincoln House	June 13, 1973 (#73002244)	August 31, 1973	W of Sparta on TN 26	Sparta	
2	Oldham Theater	Oldham Theater	November 4, 1993 (#93001188)	December 12, 2003	W. Liberty Square	Sparta	Delisted due to loss of integrity and modifications during renovation.

== See also ==
- List of National Historic Landmarks in Tennessee
- National Register of Historic Places listings in Tennessee
