= Imbo =

Imbo may refer to:

- Imbo natural region, a region of Burundi
- Imbo railway station, a railway station in Russia
- Imbo Ungu, a dialect of the Kaugel language
- Danielle Imbo, an American who disappeared in Philadelphia in 2005
