= AWP =

AWP may refer to:

== Organizations ==
=== Political parties ===
- American Workers Party
- Animal Welfare Party, a political party in the United Kingdom
- Australian Workers Party, a political party in Australia
- Awami Workers Party, a left-wing political party in Pakistan
- General Water Board Party (Algemene Waterschapspartij), a political party in the Netherlands

=== Other organizations ===
- Adventures with Purpose, a civilian scuba diving and search organization
- Associated Whistleblowing Press
- Association for Women in Psychology, a scientific educational organization encouraging feminist psychological research, theory, and activism
- Association of Writers & Writing Programs, a literary organization
- Avon and Wiltshire Mental Health Partnership NHS Trust, a mental health care provider in the south west of England
- awp Finanznachrichten, a Swiss Financial News Agency

== Technology ==
- Accuracy International AWP, a sniper rifle
- Adria–Wien Pipeline, a crude oil pipeline from the Italian-Austrian border to near Vienna, Austria
- Advanced work packaging, in construction, a process flow of detailed work packages leading to an installation work package
- Aerial work platform, a mechanical device used to effect temporary access for people or equipment to inaccessible areas, usually at height
- amusement with prize, a type of slot machine popular in some European countries

== Other ==
- Atlanta and West Point Rail Road
- Auf Wiedersehen, Pet, a British sitcom
- Average Wholesale Price, the average price at which wholesalers sell prescription drugs
- AWP Conference and Bookfair
- Awaiting parts, a term used in military logistics to indicate lack of part supply
- AWP (Arctic Warfare Police), a variant of the Accuracy International Arctic Warfare sniper rifle
