= Calfkiller Brewing Company =

Brewery in Sparta, Tennessee, US

- Industry: Alcoholic beverage
- Founded: 2010
- Headquarters: 1839 Blue Springs Rd. Sparta, Tennessee; United States
- Products: Beer
- Owner: Dave and Don Sergio
- Website: www.calfkillerbeer.com

Calfkiller Brewing Company is a brewery in Sparta, Tennessee, US.

== History ==
Calfkiller Brewing Company was founded by brothers Dave and Don Sergio. The brothers began brewery construction in June 2007, and produced their first commercial beer in July 2010.

The name Calfkiller is taken from the Calfkiller River, which runs through Sparta, Tennessee. Calfkiller has participated in several beer festivals, including the 2011 Nashville Beer Festival and the 2012 East Nashville Beer Festival.

As of 2012, the brewery had seven beers in production, with distribution limited to restaurant taps and growler fills only.

== See also ==
- Beer in the United States
