= Disappearance of Erin Foster and Jeremy Bechtel =

2000 missing persons event

Coordinates: 35°55′55″N 85°27′43″W

Erin Leigh Foster
- Born: February 28, 1982
- Died: April 3, 2000 (aged 18); Calfkiller River, Sparta, Tennessee
- Education: White County High School

Jeremy Lee Bechtel
- Born: November 7, 1982
- Died: April 3, 2000 (aged 17); Calfkiller River, Sparta, Tennessee
- Education: White County High School

Erin Foster and Jeremy Bechtel were two American teenagers from Sparta, Tennessee, who disappeared in April 2000. Their remains were eventually found in Foster's submerged vehicle in the Calfkiller River in 2021 by Jeremy Sides, a volunteer civilian cold-case investigator and YouTuber.

== Disappearance ==
Erin Foster and Jeremy Bechtel were residents of Sparta, Tennessee. Bechtel spoke to his father Ronnie Bechtel by telephone on the evening of April 3, 2000. Foster was seen by her brother Will the same evening.

Foster and Bechtel attended a party that night but returned to Foster's parents' home before leaving again. Both teenagers were probably last seen around 10:00 p.m. in Foster's black 1988 Pontiac Grand Am. Foster was 18 at the time of her disappearance, while Bechtel was 17.

== Searches ==
No one saw them alive after the evening of April 3, 2000, prompting rumors and speculation of their whereabouts including false reports of sightings. Searches were undertaken locally, and also in Pensacola, Florida, during 2005 and 2006 following reports that Foster was living and working there.

== Discovery ==
On November 24, 2021, scuba diver Jeremy Sides searched a lake near the location of the party attended by the teenagers. Sides found a submerged vehicle, but it was not Foster's Grand Am. On November 30, using sonar technology, Sides found a vehicle located thirteen feet below the surface of the Calfkiller River, next to Highway 84, before running out of daylight. The following day, on December 1, 2021, Sides returned to the vehicle he had seen in the river and went diving to film the car. The license plate was confirmed to be that of Foster's Grand Am. He called White County Sheriff Steve Page to report his discovery and to confirm that it was Foster's car with human remains found inside. The remains were later confirmed to be those of Foster and Bechtel, found in the vehicle that had been missing for 21 years.

Police have theorized that Foster lost control of her vehicle while driving on Highway 84, which did not have a guardrail along that section in 2000. As of July 2022, the police investigation was not closed, but police indicated there was no evidence of foul play.

== Burial and Cremation ==
Jeremy Bechtel was buried in 2022 while Erin was cremated the same year.

Erin's father, Cecil Foster, died in 2025 and was also cremated.

== See also ==
- List of solved missing person cases (post-2000)
