= Stan Mitchell (American football) =

American football player (1944–2012)

No. 35
- Position: Fullback

Personal information
- Born: August 17, 1944 (age 82); Wayne, Michigan, U.S.
- Died: January 24, 2012 (aged 67); Sparta, Michigan, U.S.
- Listed height: 6 ft 2 in (1.88 m)
- Listed weight: 210 lb (95 kg)

Career information
- High school: White County (Sparta, Tennessee)
- College: Tennessee (1962–1965)
- NFL draft: 1966: 8th round, 115th overall pick

Career history
- Miami Dolphins (1966–1970)

Career NFL/AFL statistics
- Rushing yards: 548
- Rushing average: 3.2
- Receptions: 42
- Receiving yards: 533
- Total touchdowns: 9
- Stats at Pro Football Reference

Stanton Earl Mitchell (August 17, 1944 — January 24, 2012) was an American professional football player who was a fullback in the National Football League (NFL). Mitchell played college football for the Tennessee Volunteers.

== Early life ==
Mitchell was born in Wayne, Michigan, grew up in Sparta, Tennessee and attended White County High School.

== College career ==
Mitchell was a three-year starter at fullback for the Tennessee Volunteers. He led them in rushing as a junior in 1964 with 325 yards. One year later, Mitchell ranked second in yards from scrimmage (512) and first in touchdowns (five) for a Volunteers team finished with a 8-1-2 record and seventh in the final Associated Press poll. He concluded his collegiate career with 1,266 rushing yards and 10 touchdowns.

== Professional career ==
Mitchell was selected in the eighth round of the 1966 NFL Draft with the 115th overall pick by the Washington Redskins but opted to sign with the newly formed Miami Dolphins of the American Football League, joining Tennessee teammate Frank Emanuel. Mitchell initially lived out of his car during training camp, expecting to be cut, and spent much of his rookie season on the taxi squad, playing in two games during the Dolphins' inaugural season. He made the team out of training camp the following year and rushed 83 times for 269 yards and three touchdowns and catching 18 passes for 133 yards and another touchdown. His four touchdowns tied for the team lead. Mitchell finished his professional career with 548 rushing yards and four touchdowns on 173 carries and 42 receptions for 533 yards and five touchdowns in 42 games played over five seasons.
