= Jeremy Sides =

America scuba diver and civilian crime investigator

- Born: Jeremy Beau Sides; October 2, 1979 (age 46)
- Other name: Nug

YouTube information
- Channel: Exploring with Nug
- Years active: 2016–present
- Subscribers: 759 thousand
- Views: 95 million
- Last updated: 13 September 2026

Jeremy Beau Sides (born October 2, 1979), aka "Nug" from the YouTube channel Exploring with Nug, is an American scuba diver and civilian crime investigator who investigates missing person cases and missing items. In 2021, he found the bodies of Erin Foster and Jeremy Bechtel, who had been missing for 21 years.

== Career ==
After high school, Sides worked for the United States Navy, in aviation hydraulics. Later he worked in the automotive industry.

=== YouTube career ===
In 2016, Sides started a metal detectorist YouTube channel, showing his searched for American Civil War relics and other lost items around his hometown. Sides' friends at work gave him the nickname Nug, short for gold nugget, joking that he was looking for gold. It stuck, and he changed the name of his channel to Exploring with Nug as he started exploring more and doing less metal detecting.

==== Cold cases ====
Sides chooses unsolved missing person cases via the Charley Project online missing persons database, focusing on cases where drivers went missing near bodies of water.

In October 2021, Sides assisted the Adventures with Purpose team while they found the truck owned by Thomas Thornton, a missing Vietnam War veteran from Tyler County, Texas. A body was found inside the truck, which police said was likely Thornton's. In November, Sides found a car containing the body of Miriam Ruth Hemphill, who had been missing since July 2005. In December, he found the car containing the bodies of two teenagers who were missing since 2000 in the Calfkiller River, Sparta, Tennessee.

In January 2022, Sides and two other divers found the vehicle of murder victim Alan Livingston, who had been missing since 1983, which they had not been actively looking for. The Federal Bureau of Investigation removed the body with local police in October 2022.

In February 2022, Sides assisted Adventures with Purpose in locating the car owned by Margaret Shupe Smith, who had been missing since April 2021. In December, Sides and several other divers and dive teams found the vehicle of Jason Spencer who had been missing since November 2022.

In April 2023, Recon Dive Recovery and Sunshine State Sonar found the vehicle of Robert Heikka who had been missing since 2020, Sides had searched for Heikka but had not located him. Sides made videos on YouTube crediting RDR & SSS for their work. Later In April, Sunshine State Sonar and Recon Dive Recovery found the vehicle of Robert Helphrey who had been missing since 2006. Sides made YouTube videos crediting their finds as well as hosting a GoFundMe fundraising campaign for his fellow Sonar Search Colleagues, raising just over $3500 to be split between the two parties.

In October 2024, Sides found the submerged car of a woman named Shannon Taylor who was found dead floating in 2016 in a South Carolina River.

Cases solved
Case	Name	Age	Missing	Found	Location
1	Thomas Thornton	72	March 24, 2021	October 24, 2021	Toledo Bend Reservoir, Shelby County, Texas
2	Miriam Ruth Hemphill	84	July 21, 2005	November 10, 2021	Melton Hill Lake, Oak Ridge, Tennessee
3	Erin Foster	18	April 3, 2000	December 1, 2021	Calfkiller River, Sparta, Tennessee
3	Jeremy Bechtel	17	April 3, 2000	December 1, 2021	Calfkiller River, Sparta, Tennessee
4	Alan Livingston	25	April 1983	January 2022	Coosa River, Gadsden, Alabama
5	Margaret "Jan" Shupe Smith	59	April 2, 2021	February 2, 2022	Lakeland, Florida
6	Jason Spencer	49	November 9, 2022	December 5, 2022	Cumberland River, Clarksville, Tennessee
7	Lae'Quan Little	26	December 31, 2024	January 13, 2025	Retention Pond, Greensboro, North Carolina
8	Jeremy Neves	25	April 3, 2025	June 27, 2025	Lytle Lake, Abilene, Texas
9	Swapnil Srivastava	27	December 6, 2025	December 20, 2025	Lake Hartwell
10	Fernando Ortiz	34	December 6, 2025	January 3, 2026	West Point Lake

== Personal life ==
Sides is from Acworth, Georgia. He is married and a father of two children.
