= Community Building (Sparta, Tennessee) =

- U.S. National Register of Historic Places
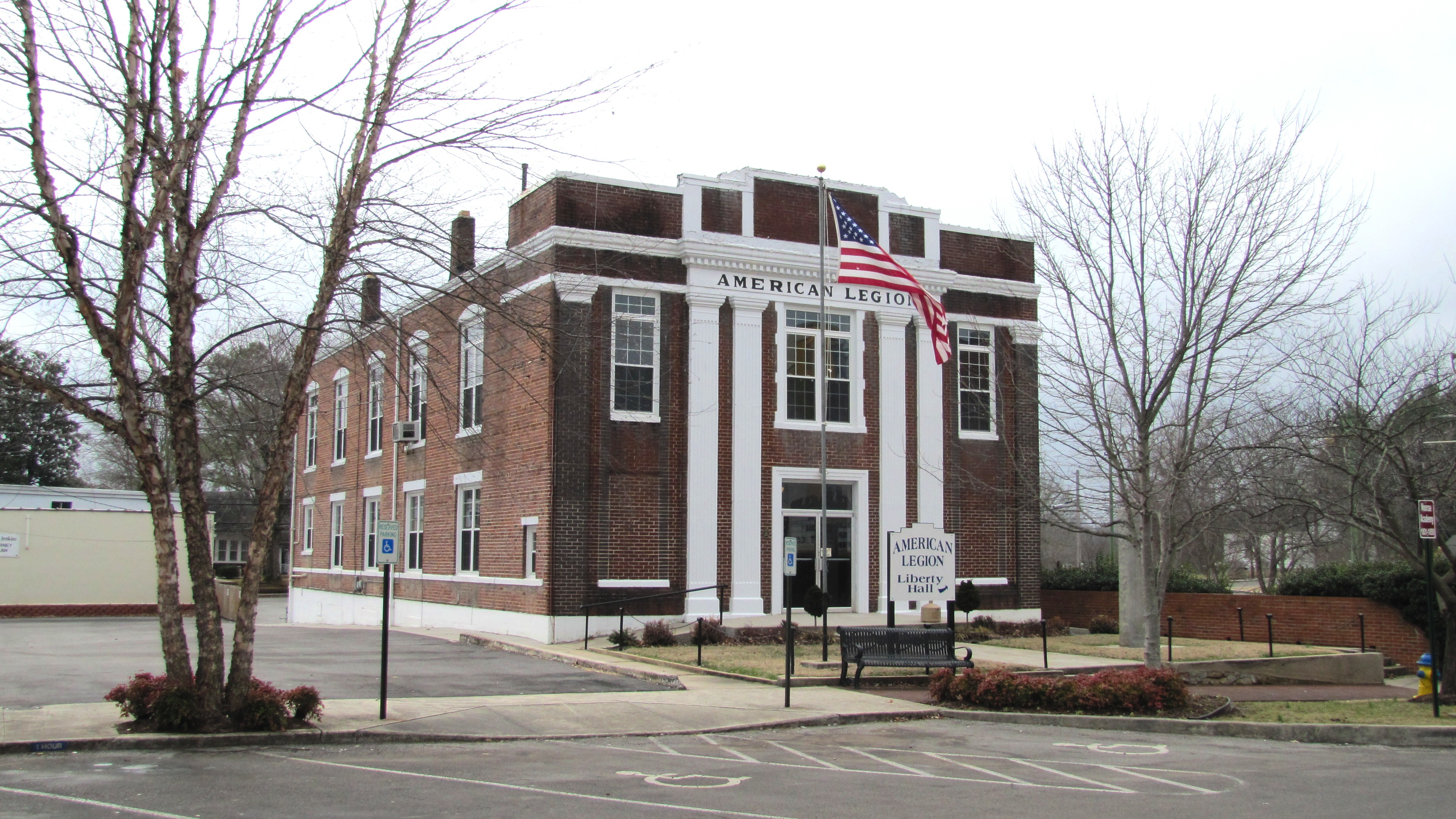

- Location within Tennessee Location within the United States
- Location: Sparta, Tennessee
- Area: less than one acre
- Built: 1935
- Architectural style: Classical Revival
- NRHP reference No.: 02000085
- Added to NRHP: May 20, 2002

The Community Building, also known as the War Memorial Building, Liberty Hall, and the American Legion Building, is a historic building in Sparta, Tennessee, U.S.. It was built in 1935. It includes a plaque to the memory of veterans of World War I, World War II, the Korean War and the Vietnam War.

The building was designed in the Classical Revival architectural style. It has been listed on the National Register of Historic Places since May 20, 2002.

The words "American Legion" run across the top of the front facade. The local American Legion post participated in the construction, and later (in 1946) purchased the building.

== See also ==
- List of American Legion buildings
- American Legion Hut (Livingston, Tennessee)
- National Register of Historic Places listings in White County, Tennessee
