= Ethan Roberts =

American baseball player (born 1997)

Free agent
- Pitcher
- Born: July 4, 1997 (age 29); Sparta, Tennessee, U.S.
- Bats: Right Throws: Right

MLB debut
- April 9, 2022, for the Chicago Cubs

MLB statistics (through 2026 season)
- Win–loss record: 2–4
- Earned run average: 4.70
- Strikeouts: 58
- Stats at Baseball Reference

Teams
- Chicago Cubs (2022, 2024–2026)

Ethan Michael Roberts (born July 4, 1997) is an American professional baseball pitcher who is a free agent. He has previously played in Major League Baseball (MLB) for the Chicago Cubs. He made his MLB debut in 2022 with the Cubs.

== Amateur career ==
Roberts attended White County High School in Sparta, Tennessee, and played college baseball at Tennessee Technological University. As a junior at Tennessee Tech in 2018, he went 6–1 with a 2.41 ERA and 14 saves over 71 innings pitched.

== Professional career ==
Following the end of the 2018 collegiate baseball season, he was selected by the Chicago Cubs in the fourth round of the 2018 Major League Baseball draft. Roberts signed with the Cubs and made his professional debut with the Eugene Emeralds, posting a 5.40 ERA over 15 innings in his professional debut season. In 2019, he began the season with the South Bend Cubs before being promoted to the Myrtle Beach Pelicans. Over 59 relief innings between the two clubs, Roberts went 4–5 with a 2.59 ERA, 13 saves, and 54 strikeouts. He did not play in 2020 due to the COVID-19 pandemic-related cancellation of the minor league season Roberts began the 2021 season with the Tennessee Smokies and was promoted to the Iowa Cubs in early August. Over 39 relief appearances and 54 innings between the two clubs, Roberts went 4–2 with a 3.00 ERA and 72 strikeouts.

On November 19, 2021, the Cubs added Roberts to their 40-man roster to protect him from the Rule 5 draft. On April 4, 2022, it was announced that Roberts had made the Opening Day roster. He made his MLB debut on April 9, throwing one scoreless inning of relief against the Milwaukee Brewers. In early May, he was placed on the injured list due to right shoulder inflammation. On June 23, it was announced he would be undergoing Tommy John surgery, ending his season. He was non-tendered and became a free agent on November 17, 2022.

On December 2, 2023, Roberts re-signed with the Cubs organization on a minor league contract. He made 12 scoreless appearances across the rookie–level Arizona Complex League Cubs, Double–A Tennessee, and Triple–A Iowa, striking out 13 in 11 1/3 innings. On June 16, 2024, the Cubs selected Roberts' contract, adding him to their MLB roster. In 21 appearances for Chicago, he posted a 3.71 ERA with 26 strikeouts across 26 1/3 innings pitched.

Roberts was optioned to Triple-A Iowa to begin the 2025 season. Roberts made 10 appearances for Chicago during the regular season, registering a 1-0 record and 6.00 ERA with six strikeouts over nine innings pitched.

Roberts was again optioned to Triple-A Iowa to begin the 2026 season. On November 20, 2026, he was non-tendered by the Cubs and became a free agent.
