= American Legion Hut (Livingston, Tennessee) =

Historic American Legion hall in Tennessee

- American Legion Bohannon Post #4
- U.S. National Register of Historic Places
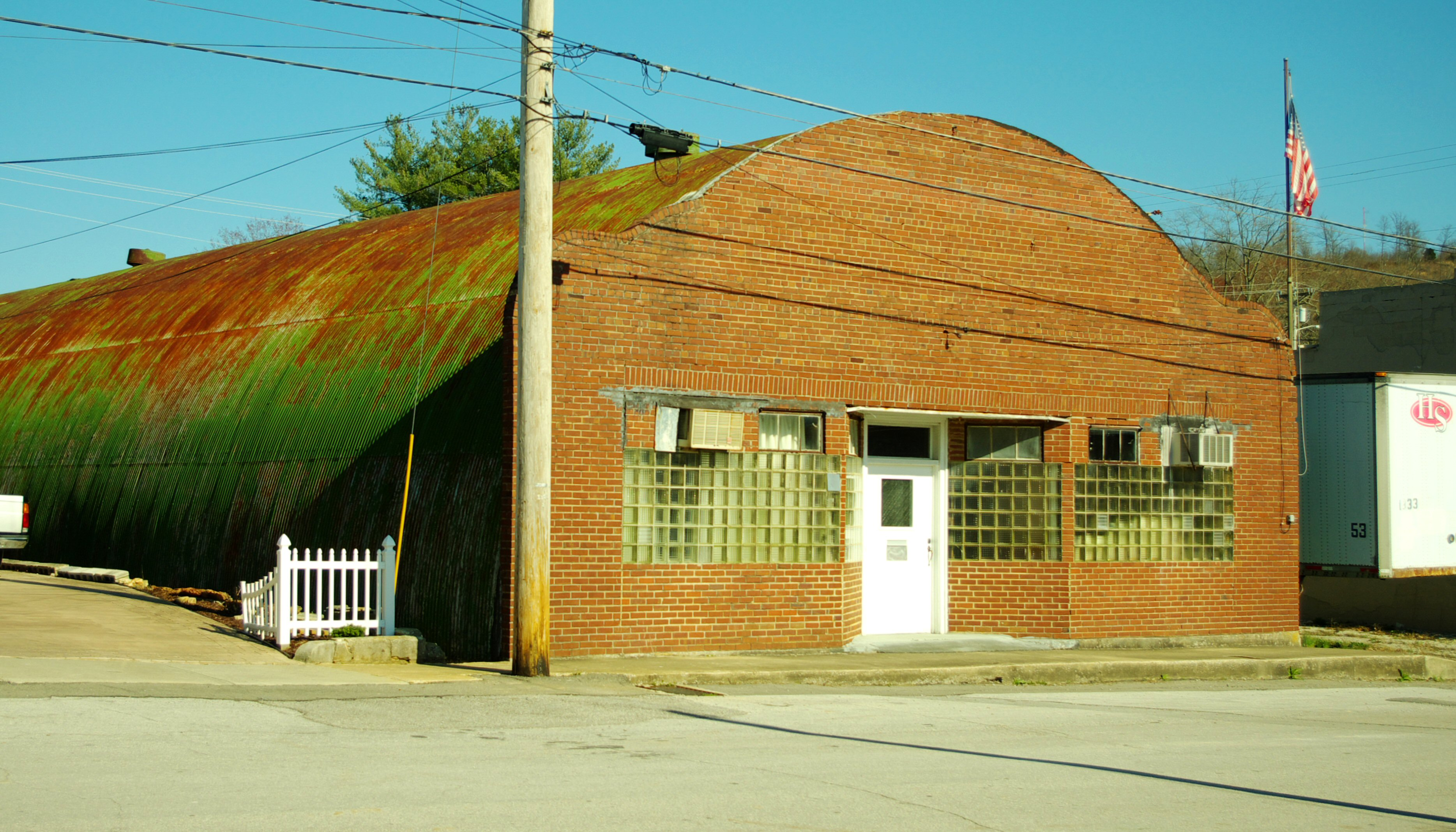
- The clubhouse in 2014 prior to restoration

- Location within Tennessee Location within the United States
- Location: 121 South Church Street, Livingston, Tennessee 38570
- Coordinates: 36°22′56″N 85°19′19″W
- Built: 1948
- Architectural style: Quonset hut, Vernacular, False front
- Website: Facebook page
- NRHP reference No.: 12000489
- Added to NRHP: August 7, 2012

The American Legion Hut, or American Legion Bohannon Post #4 is a historic clubhouse in Livingston, Tennessee. The repurposed World War II building was set up in 1948, the American Legion moved in 1949, and the National Register of Historic Places listed it in 2012.

== History ==
The American Legion is a national veterans' organization founded by soldiers from World War I. Local vets from around Livingston established the American Legion Bohannon Post #4 on April 14, 1922, as the fourth post in Tennessee. The name honored Lieutenant Shirley D. Bohannon, the son of a local judge, who died in battle with the 30th Infantry Division in 1918.

The group met on the top floor of the Overton County Courthouse from 1922 until 1949. While the post counted 161 members in 1940, following World War II, that number swelled to 548 members by 1950 which necessitated a larger meeting space. A military surplus Quonset hut was purchased from Camp Forrest by W. T. Reagan who set it up in Livingston and then opened an army-navy store in it. The American Legion purchased the building the next year, in 1949.

In addition to hosting meetings and events for the veterans, the building also provides a broader function as a community center. From 1950 until the early 1960s, the Livingston Public Library operated out of the building, and it also served as a polling place for decades. Events held at the hut include Scouting meetings, spelling bees, and auctions. On weekends, it became a dance hall with square dancing being especially popular. The group continues to lead an annual Memorial Day celebration.

In 2014, the state of Tennessee distributed funds to repair the rusted structure.

== Architecture ==
Prefabricated Quonset huts consist of a skeleton of semi-circular steel ribs with corrugated sheet metal siding. During War II, the United States mass-produced them because they could be shipped in crates and assembled in a day by a 10-person team using only hand tools. While the standard Quonset hut measured 20 feet by 48 feet, this building measures 40 feet by 100 feet because it was a utility building, which the soldiers nicknamed an "elephant hut". Of the 150,000–170,000 huts that the U.S. produced, only about 11,800 were this larger size.

The exterior of the building reflects mid-20th century vernacular architecture because a brick false front was added. That consists of three bays with a recessed entry and glass block windows on either side. A belt course runs above the bays, and the brickwork changes from running bond to American bond within the cornice. The rounded one-story building sits on a concrete foundation with no windows on the sides and was originally painted green. The roof includes a metal air vent and brick chimney while the rear has the original metal double doors.

The structure creates a cylinder-like interior space despite the addition of drop ceilings. The central meeting hall takes up most of the space and includes original speakers and fans hanging from the ceiling and a small stage. There are two rooms on either side of the front entrance, an office to the right and the former library to the left. At the rear of the building are a kitchen, bathrooms, and a storage room that opens to the attic.

== See also ==
- List of American Legion buildings
- American Legion Building (Sparta, Tennessee)
- National Register of Historic Places in Overton County, Tennessee
