= Sperry-Smith House =

Historic house in Tennessee, United States

- U.S. National Register of Historic Places
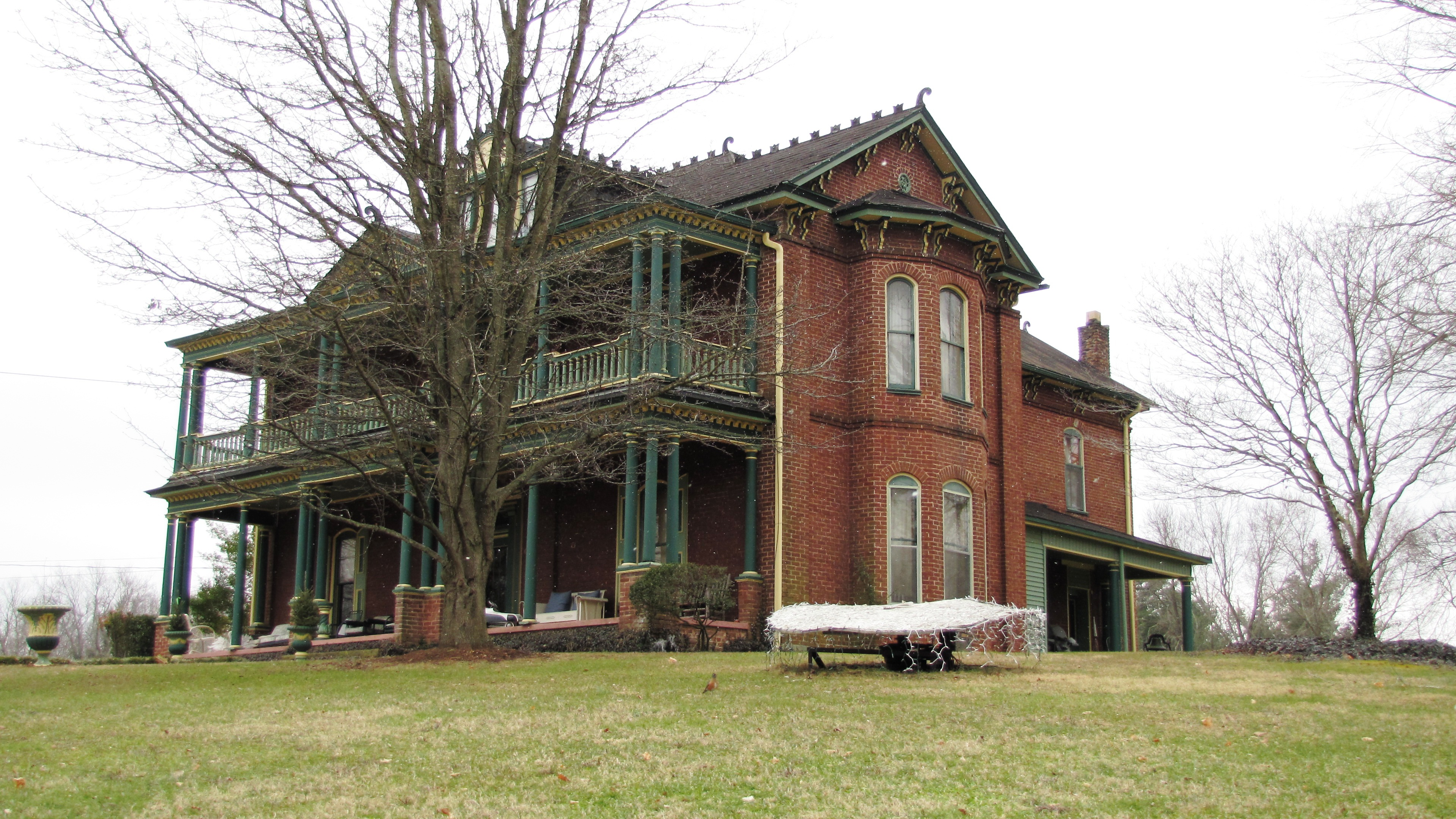
- The Sperry-Smith House in 2010

- Location within Tennessee Location within the United States
- Location: 121 Maple Street, Sparta, Tennessee
- Coordinates: 35.92414°N 85.46128°W
- Area: 2 acres (0.81 ha)
- Built: 1880; 146 years ago
- Built by: Sperry, Thomas L.
- Architectural style: Italianate, Colonial Revival
- NRHP reference No.: 96001357
- Added to NRHP: November 15, 1996

The Sperry-Smith House is a historic house in Sparta, Tennessee, U.S..

The house was built in 1880 for Thomas L. Sperry, a dry goods merchant. In 1905, it was purchased by William Templeton Smith, a Judge of the Fifth Circuit Court.

The house was designed in the Italianate and Colonial Revival architectural styles. The original design included a tower, but it was removed and a porch was built instead. It has been listed on the National Register of Historic Places since November 15, 1996.
