= White County High School (Sparta, Tennessee) =

High school in Tennessee, United States

Location
- 267 Allen Drive; Sparta, Tennessee; United States
- Coordinates: 35.940°N 85.478°W

Information
- Type: Public
- Principal: Greg Wilson
- Grades: 9–12
- Enrollment: 1,067 (2023–2024)
- Colors: Maroon and gray
- Team name: Warriors
- Website: wchs.whitecoschools.net

White County High School is a public high school located in Sparta, Tennessee. The school serves the population of White County from grades 9 through 12.

== Leadership ==
White County High School Principals

- G.C. Sipple 1909–1912
- Walter Rogers 1912–1913
- A.E. Crislip 1913–1914
- Paul E. Doran 1914–1917
- Claude Lowry 1917–1919
- Joel M. Barnes 1919–1925
- J.C. Fooshee 1925–1931
- Walter Fowler 1931–1937
- C.O. Jett 1937–1938
- W.A. Walker 1938–1947
- Quill Cope 1947–1951
- A.C. Haston 1951–1958
- James Scott 1958–1959
- Everett Mitchell 1959–1961
- Frank Medley 1961–1964
- Charles H. Sarver 1964–1978
- Charles Dycus 1978–2007
- Dr. Barry Roberts 2007–2012
- Grant Swallows 2012–2020
- Greg Wilson 2020–

== Notable alumni ==
- Paul Bailey – Tennessee state senator
- David Culley – NFL coach; former head coach of the Houston Texans
- Kellie Harper – Head coach, University of Missouri women's basketball; formerly a player for, and the head coach of, the Tennessee Lady Vols basketball team
- Stan Mitchell – Former NFL player Miami Dolphins
- Ethan Roberts – Major League Baseball pitcher
- Erin Foster and Jeremy Bechtel - Missing teenagers
