= Disappearance of Danielle Imbo and Richard Petrone Jr. =

2005 unsolved disappearance

Danielle Imbo
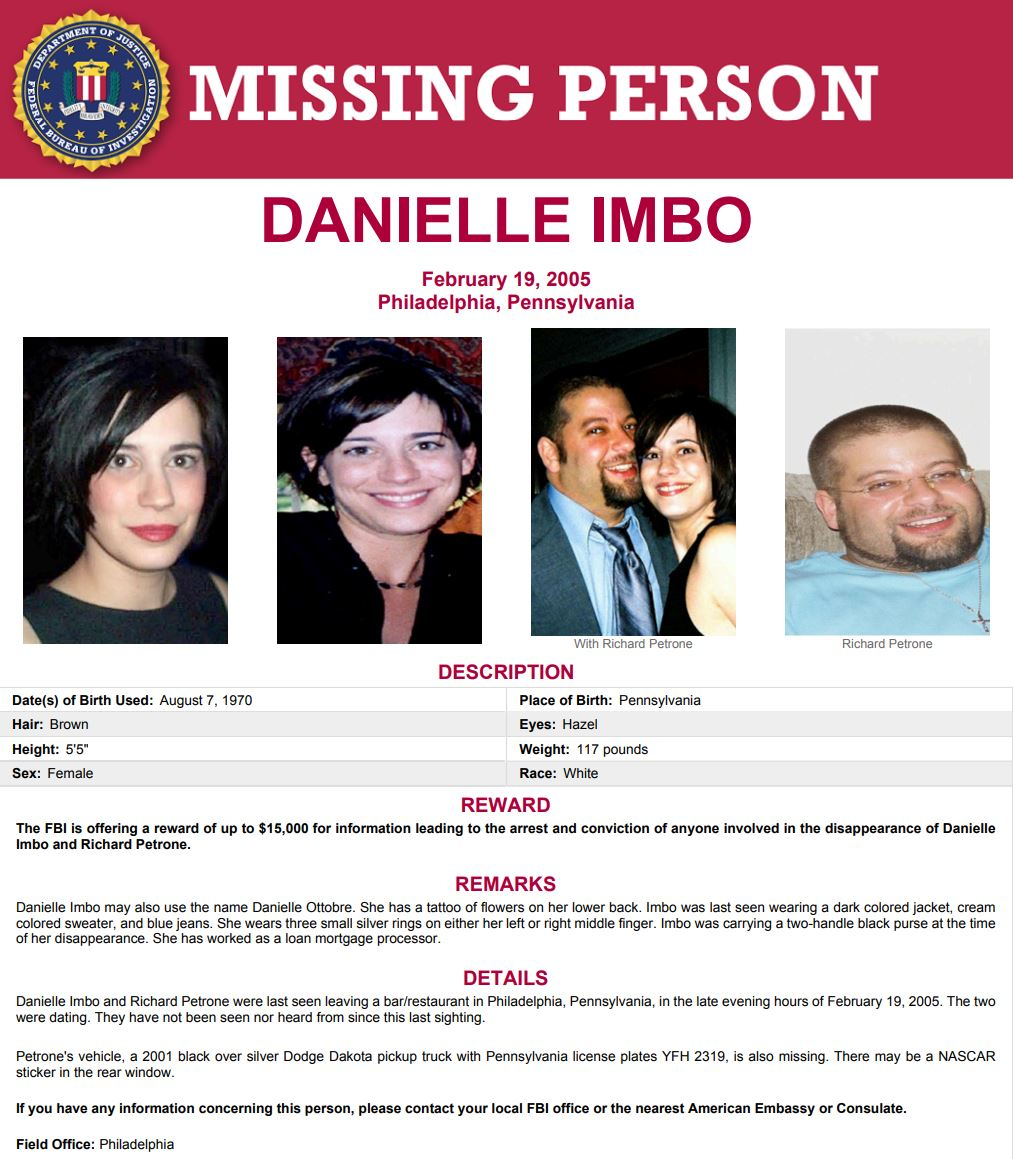
- Born: Danielle Ottobre; August 7, 1970
- Disappeared: February 19, 2005; Philadelphia, Pennsylvania
- Status: Missing for 21 years, 8 months and 3 days
- Spouse: Joe Imbo
- Parents: John Anthony Ottobre (father); Felice Corsaro (mother)
- Relatives: John Ottobre (brother)

Richard Petrone Jr.
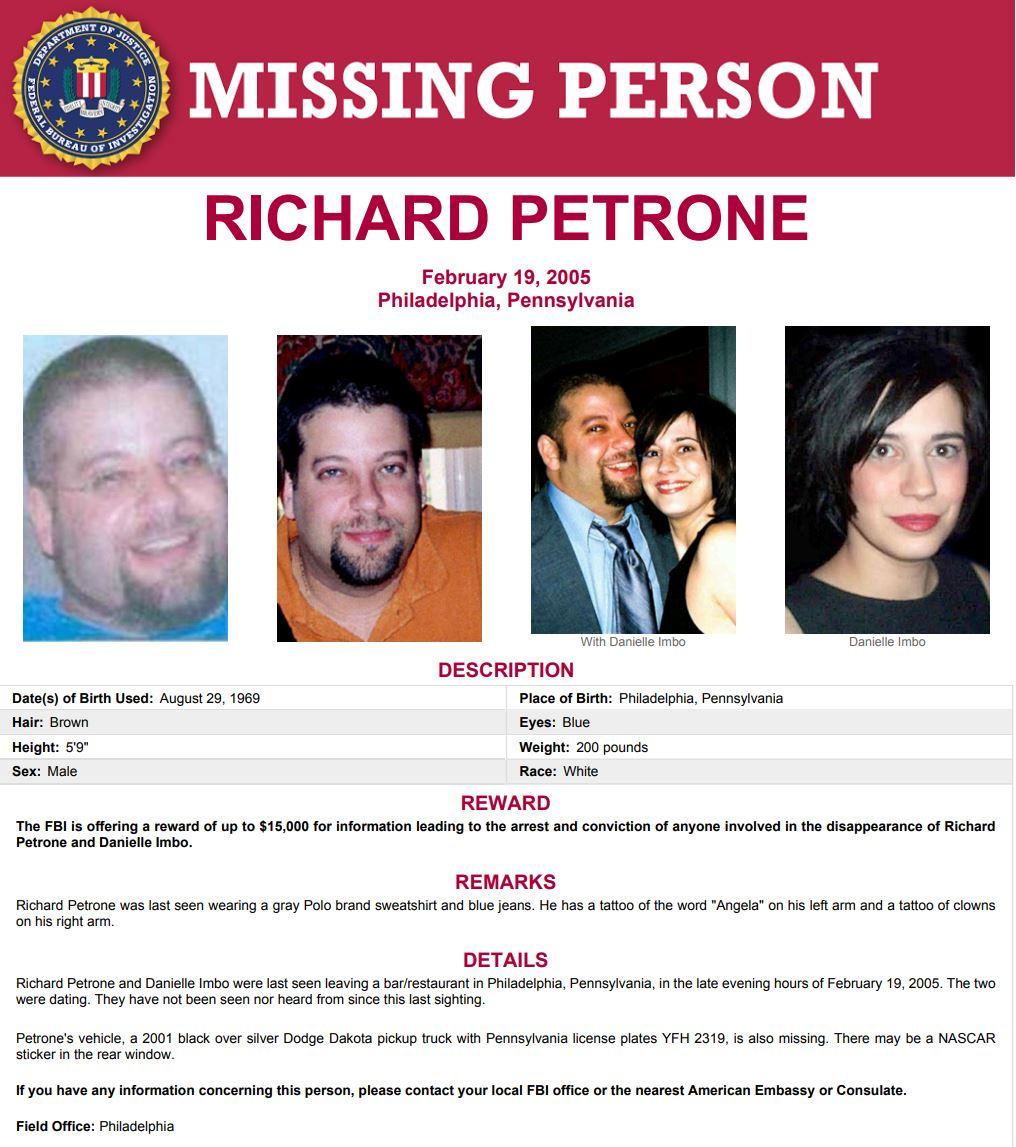
- Born: August 29, 1969
- Disappeared: February 19, 2005; Philadelphia Pennsylvania
- Status: Missing for 21 years, 8 months and 3 days
- Parents: Richard A. Petrone Sr. (father); Margaret Sonsini (mother)
- Relatives: Christine Petrone (sister); Alisa Petrone (sister)

Danielle (Ottobre) Imbo and Richard A. Petrone Jr. were an American couple who disappeared together on February 19, 2005, after visiting a bar on Philadelphia's South Street. Their case remains unsolved.

== Background ==
Danielle, aged 34, was a resident of Mt. Laurel, New Jersey, and was separated from her husband at the time of her disappearance. Petrone, aged 35, resided in Philadelphia and worked at his family's bakery. The couple had been involved in what family and friends describe as an "on again, off again" romantic relationship.

On the evening of Saturday, February 19, 2005, Imbo and Petrone joined another couple for drinks at Abilene's bar and restaurant located at 429 South Street in Philadelphia. Witnesses stated that the couple left the bar at about 11:45 p.m. en route to Imbo's New Jersey home. They were last seen walking on South Street toward Petrone's parked vehicle, a 2001 Dodge pick-up truck.

== Investigation ==
Imbo, Petrone, and their vehicle were not seen again after the night of February 19, 2005. Since their disappearance, there has been no activity on Imbo's or Petrone's cell phones or personal finances. Imbo had a 2-year-old son and Petrone had a teenage daughter. Media accounts state that both had close relationships with their children and families and were unlikely to have voluntarily disappeared.

Since 2008, the FBI has been investigating the disappearance as a possible murder for hire, but has not named any suspects.

In 2021, the disappearance continued to be investigated by the Philadelphia Police Department, New Jersey State Police, Mount Laurel Police Department, and the Burlington County Prosecutor's Office, with the FBI reporting that "an extensive investigation to date has generated some promising leads; however, neither they nor the vehicle have ever been located."

On March 22, 2022, a private search and recovery dive team, Adventures with Purpose, announced they were actively working on the case.

In 2026, retired FBI agent and former lead investigator in the case Vito Roselli said that although a murder-for-hire scheme remained a possibility, determining who would want to have them killed was "my big challenge. That was the whole challenge with this investigation. I couldn’t figure that out." He added that the couple's disappearance being accidental was "Not impossible, but highly unlikely.”

== Media depictions ==
Their case has been featured on several podcasts, including:

- The Vanished, 2016
- Obsessed With Disappeared in August 2022 in an episode titled "A Bridge Too Far: The Disappearance of Danielle Imbo & Richard Petrone".
- Crime Junkie on May 11, 2020
- Women & Crime in December 2021
- The Trail Went Cold on June 5, 2024.
- There and Gone: South Street, 2024
- Coffee and Cases E224 on April 11 2024

Their case was episode 11 of season 8 of the TV show Disappeared with the episode named "A Bridge Too Far".

== See also ==
- List of people who disappeared mysteriously (2000–present)
