= Sparta Rock House =

- U.S. National Register of Historic Places
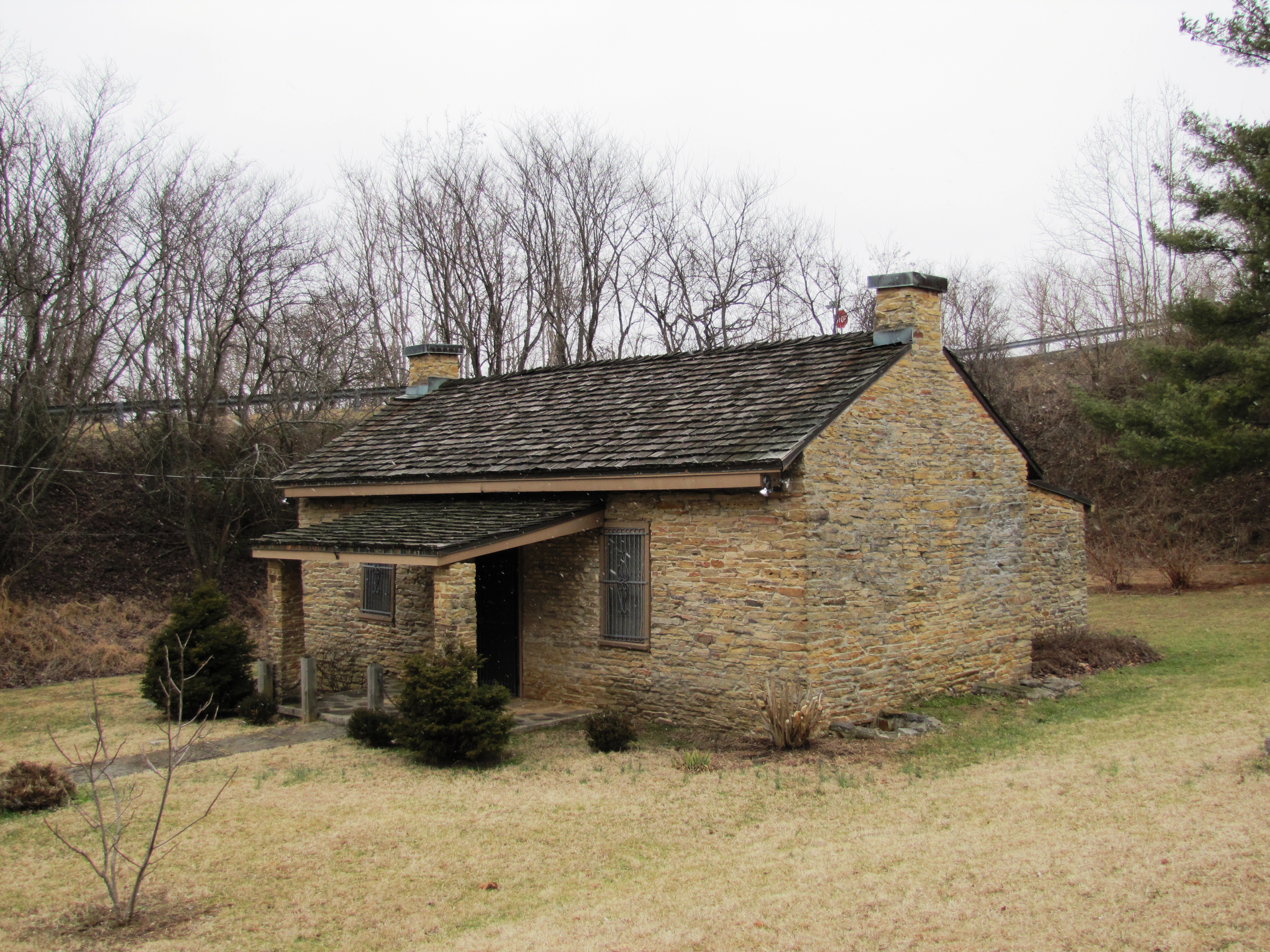

- Location within Tennessee Location within the United States
- Nearest city: Highway 70, near Sparta, Tennessee
- Coordinates: 35°55′13″N 85°24′13″W
- Area: 7 acres (2.8 ha)
- Built: 1830s
- NRHP reference No.: 73001856
- Added to NRHP: August 14, 1973

The Sparta Rock House State Historic Site is a stone building near Sparta, Tennessee, United States, that once served as a rest stop and tollhouse. Built in the late 1830s, the Rock House catered to traffic along an important wagon road between Knoxville and Nashville, offering badly needed lodging and supplies to travellers who had just crossed (or were about to cross, depending on their direction) the rugged Cumberland Plateau. The Rock House was added to the National Register of Historic Places in 1973 for its architecture and its historical role as an important rest stop.

The Rock House was probably built by either Samuel Denton or brothers Barlow and Madison Fiske, and initially operated by the latter two. Early guests at the Rock House included presidents Andrew Jackson and James K. Polk, and Governor Sam Houston. It was home to a tollhouse and supply store until at least the 1850s, and was used as a school at various times between 1880 and 1921. Due primarily to the efforts of the Daughters of the American Revolution, the state purchased and began restoring the Rock House in the 1940s. The Rock House is currently operated as a State Historic Site under an agreement with the Tennessee Historical Commission.

== Location ==
The Sparta Rock House is located at the junction of U.S. Route 70 and White County Highway 2220 (Country Club Road). The Rock House property sits on a shelf-like slope that lies along the physiographic boundary between the Cumberland Plateau to the east and the Highland Rim to west. The elevation of US-70 is approximately 900 feet (270 m) at Sparta (on the Highland Rim), 1,300 feet (400 m) as it passes the Rock House, and just over 1,800 feet (550 m) as it tops out at the edge of the Cumberland Plateau. The Rock House State Historic Site property includes a large plot of woodland that extends east from the Rock House to Old Bon Air Road.

== History ==
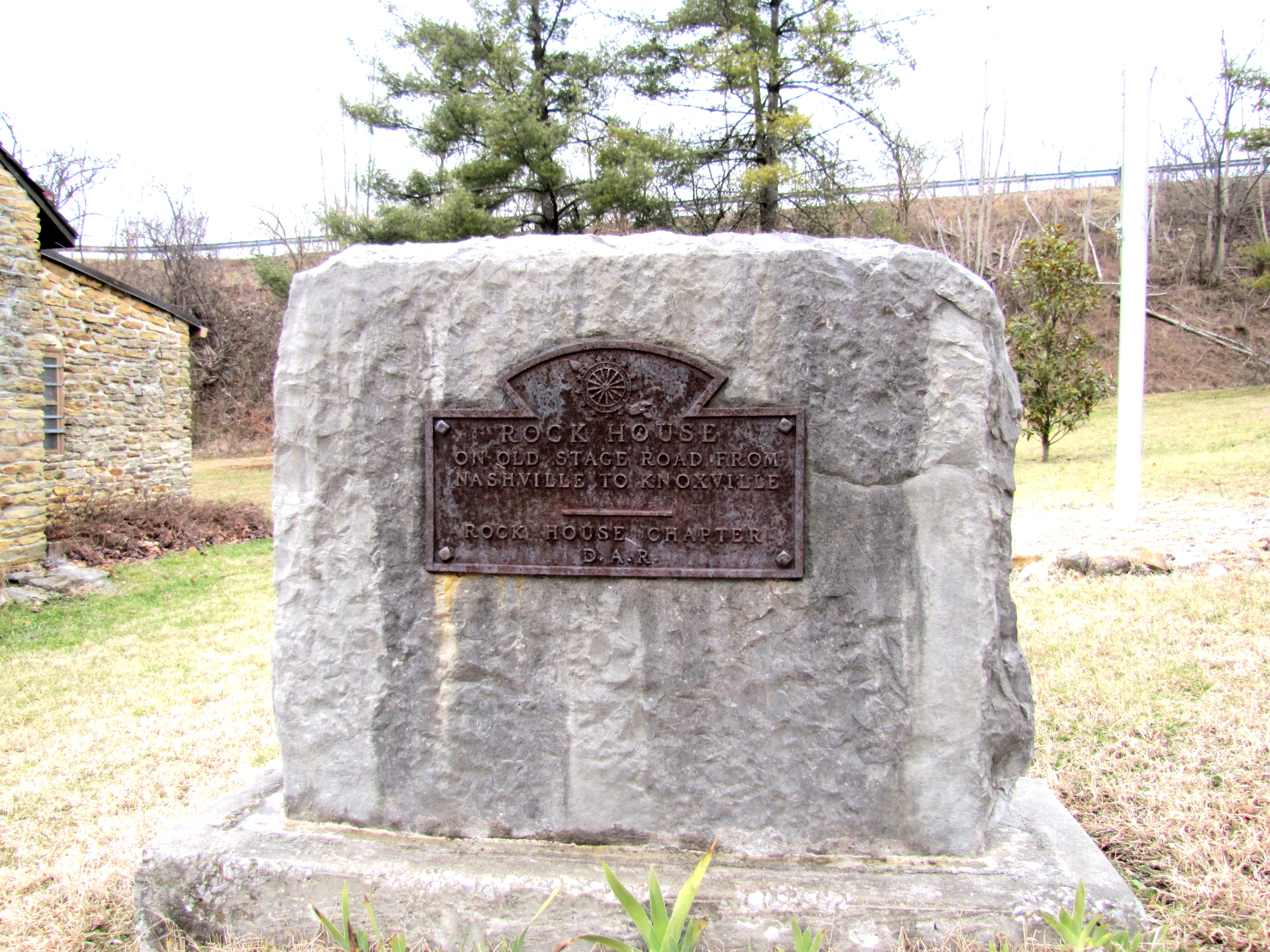
DAR marker at the Rock House site

The Walton Road, an early wagon road connecting Knoxville and Nashville, forked at Crossville atop the Cumberland Plateau. The main branch (roughly following the modern US-70N) continued northwestward to what is now Monterey, while a second branch (roughly following the modern US-70) proceeded westward to what is now Sparta. To provide a rest stop for travellers along the latter branch, the Rock House was built on the property of local farmer Samuel Denton sometime between 1835 and 1839. While sources are unclear as to whether Denton or the Fiske brothers, Barlow and Madison, built the Rock House, the Fiske brothers were nevertheless in possession of the structure by 1839. There is no definitive evidence that Barlow and Madison Fiske were brothers. Along with providing a nightly stopover, the Rock House was used as a tollhouse until the late 1850s, as wagon roads during this period were often contracted out to local operators. The construction of the Bon Air Hotel atop the Plateau a few miles to the east in the 1840s no doubt brought increased traffic to the Rock House, although the hotel was destroyed during the U.S. Civil War.

In the late-19th and early-20th centuries, the Rock House was used variously as a residence and a school, known simply as the "Rock House School." In 1941, the Daughters of the American Revolution obtained appropriations from the Tennessee state government to purchase and restore the Rock House, which it operated as a public museum and meeting place for its local chapter. A local craftsman named Clifton Broyle completed numerous renovations at the Rock House in the 1960s.

== Design ==
The Rock House was originally a rectangular structure built of native sandstone quarried in the vicinity. A partition once divided the structure into two rooms, but that partition has been removed, and the original section of the structure now consists of one large room. A 1909 photograph shows a partially enclosed front porch spanning the front wall, but by the 1940s the porch had been torn down. In the mid-20th century, a new rear section was added to the structure, built of the same type of stone, but containing modern conveniences. The interior of the Rock House has large fireplaces at both ends of the original structure, and the wooden doors, window frames, ceiling, floor, and mantels are all original.
