= Adventures with Purpose =

Cold case investigators

YouTube information
- Channel: Adventures with Purpose
- Years active: 2018–present
- Subscribers: 3.42 million
- Views: 435 million
- Last updated: 1 July 2025
- Website: adventureswithpurpose.com

Adventures with Purpose (AWP) is an American group of professional scuba divers who use underwater sonar imaging equipment and bathymetry mapping technology to locate missing persons and their vehicles in waterbodies. Originally focused on clean-up, their channel's focus was turned to missing persons cold cases after their accidental discovery of a missing person. The group documents their efforts on their YouTube channel.

== Background ==
Adventures with Purpose was founded in Oregon in 2018 by Jared Leisek, who collected trash from rivers and lakes. (Note: The AWP YouTube channel was registered in July 2018) Doug Bishop, a diver and manager of a towing company, soon joined Leisek to assist in vehicle removal. The group began as an environmental cleanup agency, removing cars that were polluting waterways. After twice finding cars with missing people in them, they determined a need to look for people who had gone missing in or with their vehicles.

The channel receives tip-offs and requests from the public through their social media accounts. They do not pursue rewards from family or charge the families or police involved, but will not reject rewards if given. AWP funds its searches through video views, subscribers, donations, and merchandise sales.

On May 12, 2022, Leisek registered a new company, Underwater Investigations LLC, which now holds the rights to Adventures with Purpose.

== Search process ==
At the identified waterbody, the team traverse the waters in small inflatable boats, scanning the bottom of the waterbody using sonar. Upon identifying areas of interest, they circle the area for further identification on their sonar displays before using a heavy-duty magnet to attach their line to the sunken vehicle. They mark the location with a buoy and then use divers to make a visual identification of the vehicle, retrieve a license plate, search for bodies, and prepare the vehicle and its contents for retrieval by police.

== Legal issues ==
In 2020, AWP threatened to sue for a $100,000 reward pledged by five anonymous donors for the discovery of Ethan Kazmerzak, who had disappeared in 2013. The Kazmerzak family donated an undisclosed amount.

In October 2022, the team had six members. The following month, Leisek was accused of raping a 9-year-old female relative at age 16–17 in Utah in 1992. Several team members, including Bishop, diver Nick Rinn, and lead videographer Joshua Cantu subsequently left the team. On January 5, 2023, Leisek was charged in Sanpete County, Utah. Adventures with Purpose subsequently announced that they were on a 3-month tour with a new team of divers and filmmakers.

On December 13, 2024, Underwater Investigations LLC filed a copyright infringement lawsuit against Cantu. Cantu alleged that the lawsuit stems from his posting behind-the-scenes videos of Adventures with Purpose before the formation of Underwater Investigations LLC. The case remains pending.

== Cases ==
The team usually deals with cold cases, but they have also volunteered for searches in recent cases. Certain recent cases may be incidental while searching the waterbody for a cold case. As of August 2025, the group has solved 37 cases involving 39 missing persons. AWP also sometimes cooperates with other teams with the same purpose, such as Exploring with Nug, Chaos Divers and Sunshine State Sonar.

Cases solved
Case	Name	Age	Missing	Found	Location
1	Nathan Ashby	22	July 31, 2019	December 29, 2019	Missouri River, Pinckney Township, Missouri; 38.6606°N 91.2438°W
2	Timothy Robinson	56	November 26, 2008	May 26, 2020	Willamette River, Milwaukie, Oregon; 45.4433°N 122.6446°W
3	Nicholas Allen	17	February 20, 2020	October 1, 2020	Yadkin River, Linwood, North Carolina; 35.7231°N 80.3913°W
4	Ethan Kazmerzak	22	September 15, 2013	October 26, 2020	Chapin, Iowa; 42.80618°N 93.2178°W
5	Bill Simmons	57	June 15, 2020	January 26, 2021	Cumberland River, Nashville, Tennessee; 36.2451°N 86.7021°W
6	Antonio Amaro Lopez	57	February 14, 2021	February 17, 2021	Columbia River, Portland, Oregon; 45.5910°N 122.5481°W
7	Tammy Goff	59	July 12, 2018	May 14, 2021	Missouri River, Great Falls, Montana; 47.3979°N 111.3170°W
8	Richard Ritz	74	September 13, 2020	June 3, 2021	Willamette River, Cathedral Park, Oregon; 45.5871°N 122.7651°W
9	John Zarkowski	72	September 4, 2021	September 22, 2021	Missouri River, Plattsmouth, Nebraska; 41.0145°N 95.8685°W
10	Nadine Moses	84	May 4, 2021	September 25, 2021	St. Clair River, Marine City, Michigan; 42.7062°N 82.4965°W
11	Charles Fluharty	57	October 19, 2014	October 5, 2021	Yellow Creek, Yellow Creek Township, Ohio; 40.5732°N 80.6671°W
12	Carey Mae Parker	23	March 17, 1991	October 16, 2021	Lake Tawakoni, Hawk Cove, Texas; 32.8678°N 96.0703°W
13	Thomas Thornton	72	March 24, 2021	October 24, 2021	Toledo Bend Reservoir, Shelby County, Texas; 31.7514°N 93.8436°W
14	Samantha Hopper	19	September 11, 1998	October 26, 2021	Lake Dardanelle, Russellville, Arkansas; 35.3211°N 93.1470°W
14	Courtney Holt	1	September 11, 1998	October 26, 2021	Lake Dardanelle, Russellville, Arkansas; 35.3211°N 93.1470°W
15	Jeff Shepherd	30	March 14, 2018	December 5, 2021	Strunk, Kentucky; 36.6466°N 84.4332°W
16	Stephanie Torres	42	December 21, 2017	January 19, 2022	Brazos River, Waco, Texas; 31.5825°N 97.1517°W
17	Annie Lee Hampton	66	October 10, 2019	January 28, 2022	Bear Creek Lake, Marianna, Arkansas; 34.7090°N 90.6940°W
18	Margaret "Jan" Shupe Smith	59	April 2, 2021	February 2, 2022	Lakeland, Florida; 28.1387°N 81.9470°W
19	James Amabile	38	December 4, 2003	March 19, 2022	Darby Creek, Ridley Township, Pennsylvania; 39.8705°N 75.3130°W
20	Dedrick Smith	26	October 4, 2006	April 1, 2022	Winston Lake, Winston-Salem, North Carolina; 36.1159°N 80.2028°W
21	Matthew "Jed" Hall	16	January 22, 2018	May 1, 2022	Snake River, Idaho Falls, Idaho; 43.5046°N 112.0490°W
22	Ralph Brown	77	May 16, 2021	May 13, 2022	Willamette River, Newberg, Oregon; 45.2853°N 122.9681°W
23	Kiely Rodni	16	August 6, 2022	August 21, 2022	Prosser Creek Reservoir, Truckee, California; 39.3829°N 120.1581°W
24	Donald Messier	34	October 15, 2006	October 5, 2022	Winooski River, Duxbury, Vermont; 44.3307°N 72.7582°W
25	Tod DiMinno	54	September 30, 2022	October 8, 2022	Allegheny River, Pittsburgh, Pennsylvania
26	Dale Nicholson	61	December 10, 2016	January 23, 2023	River Derwent, Tasmania, Australia; 42.777592°S 147.060017°E
27	Jacob VanZant	24	February 17, 2023	April 15, 2023	San Joaquin River, Stockton, California; 38.060259°N 121.499616°W
28	Rochelle Stanfield	84	March 6, 2023	May 5, 2023	Mississippi River, Tiptonville, Tennessee; 36.366390°N 89.506233°W
29	Maureen Sherman	47	May 1, 1985	January 5, 2024	Miami, Florida
30	Kareem Tisdale	30	December 16, 2005	January 6, 2024	Sunrise, Florida
31	Arnel Nagal Narvaiz	36	July 1, 1994	April 13, 2024	Sutton Slough, California
32	Karmen Neilson	62	November 20, 2016	July 24, 2024	Sacramento River, Sacramento, California
33	Eddie Pullin	27	October 19, 2024	November 9, 2024	Columbia River, Portland, Oregon
34	Bradley Benford	59	May 18, 2024	February 1, 2025	San Jacinto River, Cleveland, Texas
35	Robert Long	62	December 21, 2010	July 7, 2025	
36	Yvon Guévin	75	July 6, 2014	July 11, 2025	Saint-François River, Canada
37	Whisper Owen	36	July 15, 2025	August 17, 2025	Canal, San Joaquin County, California
37	Sandra McCarty	8 months	July 15, 2025	August 17, 2025	Canal, San Joaquin County, California
