= Awp Finanznachrichten =

Swiss business news agency

Awp Finanznachrichten AG is a leading Swiss business news agency based in Zurich, Switzerland. awp was founded in 1957 and is today jointly owned by the Schweizerische Depeschenagentur (SDA), the Deutsche Presse-Agentur (dpa) and by Thomson Reuters (30%).

Awp Finanznachrichten regularly reports on current events from Switzerland and abroad providing facts and figures on companies, markets and industries. The news stories are available in German and French. Awp news is a resource of the Swiss financial center and his companies. More than 1.000 reports on the topics of business, markets, financial analysis, macroeconomics and politics are edited and distributed daily by awp.

awp Finanznachricten publishes in all leading financial information systems such as Bloomberg, Factset, Interactive Data, SIX Financial Information, SunGard, Thomson Reuters and Infront financial systems. More than 30.000 professional users read awp news daily, inclusively many Internet platforms and web portals. In addition, several Swiss print media rely on the stock market comments and background reports on awp Finanznachrichten.
