= Monterey, Tennessee =

- Town
- Town of Monterey
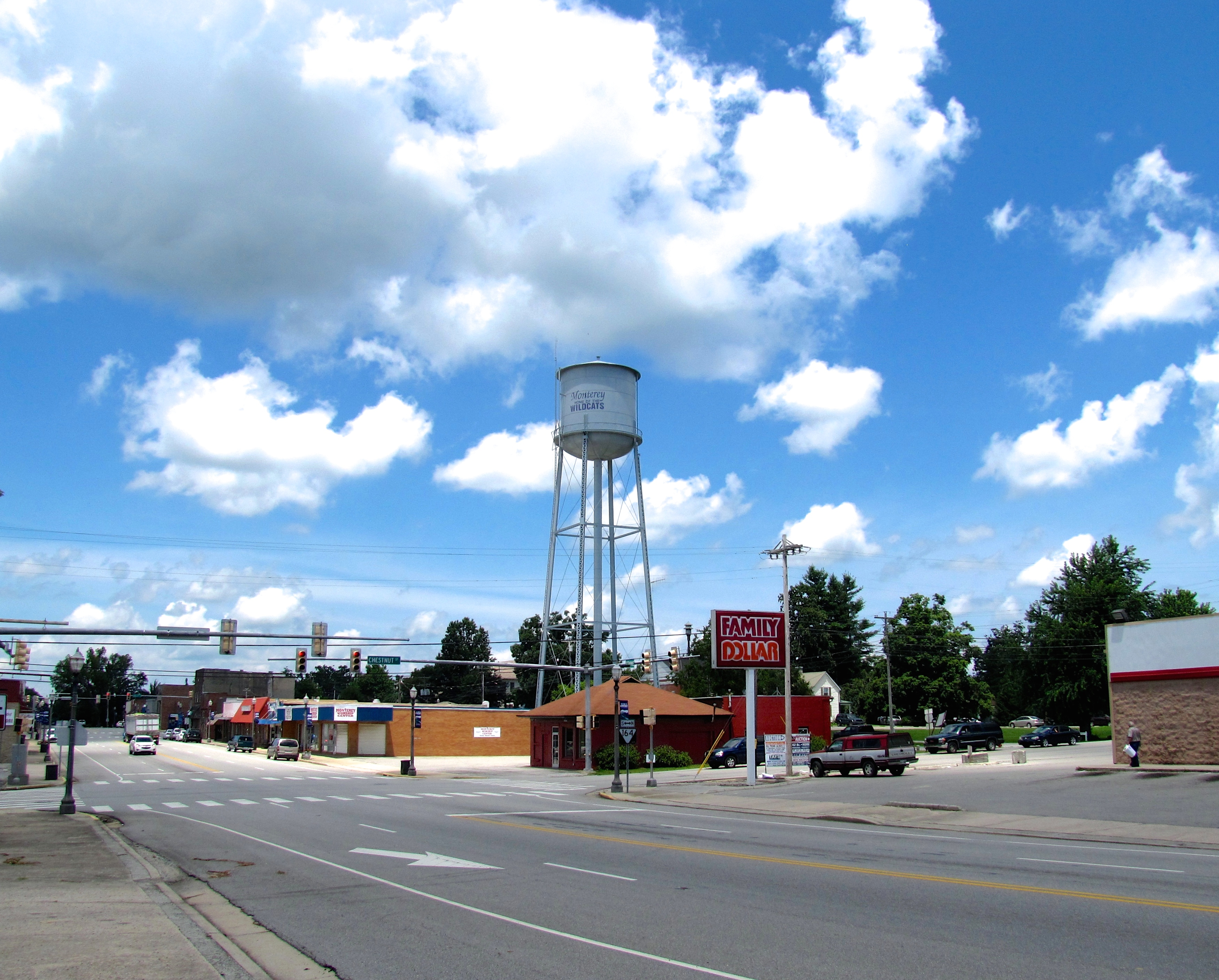
- East Commercial Avenue
- Motto(s): "", "Where Hilltops Kiss the Sky"
- Location of Monterey in Putnam County, Tennessee
- Coordinates: 36°8′43″N 85°15′57″W
- Country: United States
- State: Tennessee
- County: Putnam
- Incorporated: 1893
- Named for: Spanish for "King of the Mountain"

Government
  - Type: Mayor-council
  - Mayor: Alex Garcia
  - Vice mayor: Kevin Peters
  - Town council: Aldermen: Spencer Delk (Ward 1); Jim Whitaker (Ward 2); Larry Bennett (Ward 2); Jim Wolfgram (Ward 3); Cecilia Paulsen (Ward 3); Bill Wiggins (Ward 4); Nathan Walker (Jamie Phillips); Charles Looper

Area
  - Total: 3.03 sq mi (7.85 km^{2})
  - Land: 3.03 sq mi (7.84 km^{2})
  - Water: 0.0039 sq mi (0.01 km^{2})
- Elevation: 1,880 ft (570 m)

Population (2020)
  - Total: 2,746
  - Density: 907.0/sq mi (350.18/km^{2})
- Time zone: UTC-6 (Central (CST))
  - Summer (DST): UTC-5 (CDT)
- ZIP code: 38574
- Area code: 931
- FIPS code: 47-49760
- GNIS feature ID: 1294185
- Website: www.townofmontereytn.com

Monterey is a town in Putnam County, Tennessee, United States. As of the 2020 census, Monterey had a population of 2,746. It is part of the Cookeville, Tennessee micropolitan statistical area.

== History ==
Monterey is rooted in a settlement that developed around a landmark known as the "Standing Stone" in the late 18th and early 19th centuries. The stone was as a guidepost for travelers along Avery's Trace, and is believed to have earlier served as a boundary marker between the territories of the Cherokee and Shawnee. By 1805, three families had settled permanently in area, and the Standing Stone Inn was established to cater to westward-bound migrants.

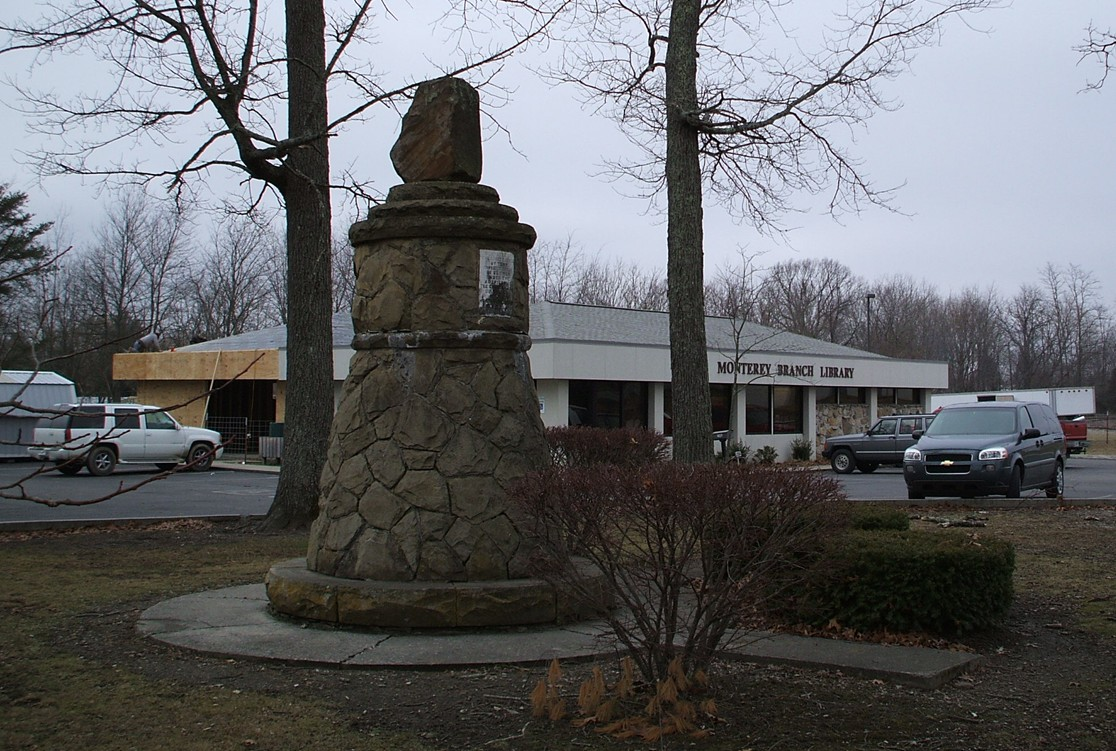
The Standing Stone Monument

In the spring of 1864, during the Civil War, 200 Union soldiers led by Colonel William B. Stokes entered the Monterey area with orders to root out Confederate guerrilla activity. On the morning of March 12 of that year, Stokes' men entered the home of William Alexander Officer near Monterey and killed six of his guests, having accused them of being Confederate guerrillas. A Tennessee Historical Commission marker on Commercial Avenue in Monterey remembers the event.

With the progress of the Tennessee Central Railway coming up the mountain from Cookeville, the Cumberland Mountain Coal Company, a group of 10 investors, bought property that contained coal from T.J. Whittaker. The company was interested in building a new company town to provide housing and commercial ventures for the workers. They hired Maj. Robert John Moscrip to lay out the new town. A contest was held to name it; Moscrip won. The new town was to be named “Monterey”, which meant "King of the Mountains", and coal was king. Moscrip continued engineering the railroad tracks out the Crawford Branch into Overton County. That line opened by 1894. He was also hired to open coal lands for the Alexander Crawford family up to 1904. A female contractor was hired, which was unheard of at the time, to build a portion of that line.

On the evening of April 3, 2020, the National Weather Service issued a flash flood warning for the watershed of the Calfkiller River due to the failure of the dam confining the town's municipal lake.

== Geography ==
Monterey is located at 36°8′43″N 85°15′57″W (36.145291, -85.265757). The town is situated at the western edge of the Cumberland Plateau in eastern Putnam County, just north of the point where the counties of Putnam, White, and Cumberland meet, and just southwest of the point where Putnam, Overton, and Fentress meet. It is located about 90 miles (140 km) east of Nashville and the same distance west of Knoxville, and is connected with these two cities by Interstate 40 (exits 300 and 301) and U.S. Route 70. State Route 84 connects Monterey with Livingston to the northwest and Sparta to the southwest. State Route 62 connects Monterey with Clarkrange along U.S. Route 127 to the east, and State Route 164 connects the town with Crawford and the rural areas of the western plateau to the north.

The sources of the Calfkiller River and the Falling Water River are both located just west of Monterey, on opposite sides of I-40.

According to the United States Census Bureau, the town has a total area of 3.0 square miles (7.8 km^{2}), of which 0.34% is covered by water.

=== Climate ===
Climate data for Monterey, Tennessee (1991–2020 normals, extremes 1904–present)
Month	Jan	Feb	Mar	Apr	May	Jun	Jul	Aug	Sep	Oct	Nov	Dec	Year
Record high °F (°C)	75 (24)	78 (26)	82 (28)	86 (30)	90 (32)	103 (39)	102 (39)	99 (37)	99 (37)	93 (34)	82 (28)	73 (23)	103 (39)
Mean maximum °F (°C)	64.2 (17.9)	67.6 (19.8)	74.4 (23.6)	81.2 (27.3)	84.8 (29.3)	89.5 (31.9)	90.8 (32.7)	90.3 (32.4)	87.8 (31.0)	81.3 (27.4)	73.4 (23.0)	64.7 (18.2)	92.3 (33.5)
Mean daily maximum °F (°C)	43.1 (6.2)	47.4 (8.6)	56.2 (13.4)	66.5 (19.2)	74.5 (23.6)	81.1 (27.3)	84.2 (29.0)	83.3 (28.5)	78.0 (25.6)	67.6 (19.8)	55.7 (13.2)	46.6 (8.1)	65.4 (18.5)
Daily mean °F (°C)	35.2 (1.8)	38.8 (3.8)	46.7 (8.2)	56.4 (13.6)	65.0 (18.3)	72.1 (22.3)	75.4 (24.1)	74.4 (23.6)	68.7 (20.4)	57.7 (14.3)	46.9 (8.3)	39.0 (3.9)	56.4 (13.6)
Mean daily minimum °F (°C)	27.2 (−2.7)	30.1 (−1.1)	37.3 (2.9)	46.3 (7.9)	55.6 (13.1)	63.2 (17.3)	66.6 (19.2)	65.6 (18.7)	59.4 (15.2)	47.8 (8.8)	38.2 (3.4)	31.4 (−0.3)	47.4 (8.5)
Mean minimum °F (°C)	5.2 (−14.9)	11.5 (−11.4)	18.6 (−7.4)	29.5 (−1.4)	38.7 (3.7)	50.5 (10.3)	57.1 (13.9)	56.2 (13.4)	44.2 (6.8)	31.3 (−0.4)	20.8 (−6.2)	13.0 (−10.6)	3.3 (−15.9)
Record low °F (°C)	−6 (−21)	−11 (−24)	2 (−17)	18 (−8)	31 (−1)	42 (6)	51 (11)	49 (9)	35 (2)	22 (−6)	−7 (−22)	−6 (−21)	−11 (−24)
Average precipitation inches (mm)	5.72 (145)	5.75 (146)	6.00 (152)	5.82 (148)	5.42 (138)	5.48 (139)	5.63 (143)	4.51 (115)	4.79 (122)	3.80 (97)	4.73 (120)	6.69 (170)	64.34 (1,635)
Average snowfall inches (cm)	4.8 (12)	5.0 (13)	2.8 (7.1)	0.3 (0.76)	0.0 (0.0)	0.0 (0.0)	0.0 (0.0)	0.0 (0.0)	0.0 (0.0)	0.0 (0.0)	0.2 (0.51)	2.9 (7.4)	16.0 (41)
Average precipitation days (≥ 0.01 in)	15.1	13.5	14.2	12.5	13.0	12.6	12.4	10.8	9.5	10.1	10.8	14.1	148.6
Average snowy days (≥ 0.1 in)	3.3	3.0	1.6	0.2	0.0	0.0	0.0	0.0	0.0	0.0	0.3	1.7	10.1
Source 1: NOAA
Source 2: National Weather Service

== Demographics ==
Historical population
Census	Pop.	Note	%±
1910	1,107		—
1920	1,445		30.5%
1930	1,731		19.8%
1940	1,742		0.6%
1950	2,043		17.3%
1960	2,069		1.3%
1970	2,351		13.6%
1980	2,610		11.0%
1990	2,559		−2.0%
2000	2,717		6.2%
2010	2,850		4.9%
2020	2,746		−3.6%

=== 2020 census ===
Monterey racial composition
Race	Number	Percentage
White (non-Hispanic)	1,863	67.84%
Black or African American (non-Hispanic)	10	0.36%
Native American	2	0.07%
Other/multiracial	89	3.24%
Hispanic or Latino	782	28.48%

As of the 2020 United States census, 2,746 people, 877 households, and 616 families resided in the town.

=== 2000 census ===
As of the census of 2000, 2,717 people, 1,029 households, and 697 families lived in the town. The population density was 920.9 inhabitants per square mile (355.6/km^{2}). The 1,141 housing units had an average density of 386.7 per square mile (149.3/km^{2}). The racial makeup of the town was 88.81% White, 0.92% African American, 0.04% Native American, 0.18% Asian, 9.09% from other races, and 0.96% from two or more races. Hispanics or Latinos of any race were 16.34% of the population.

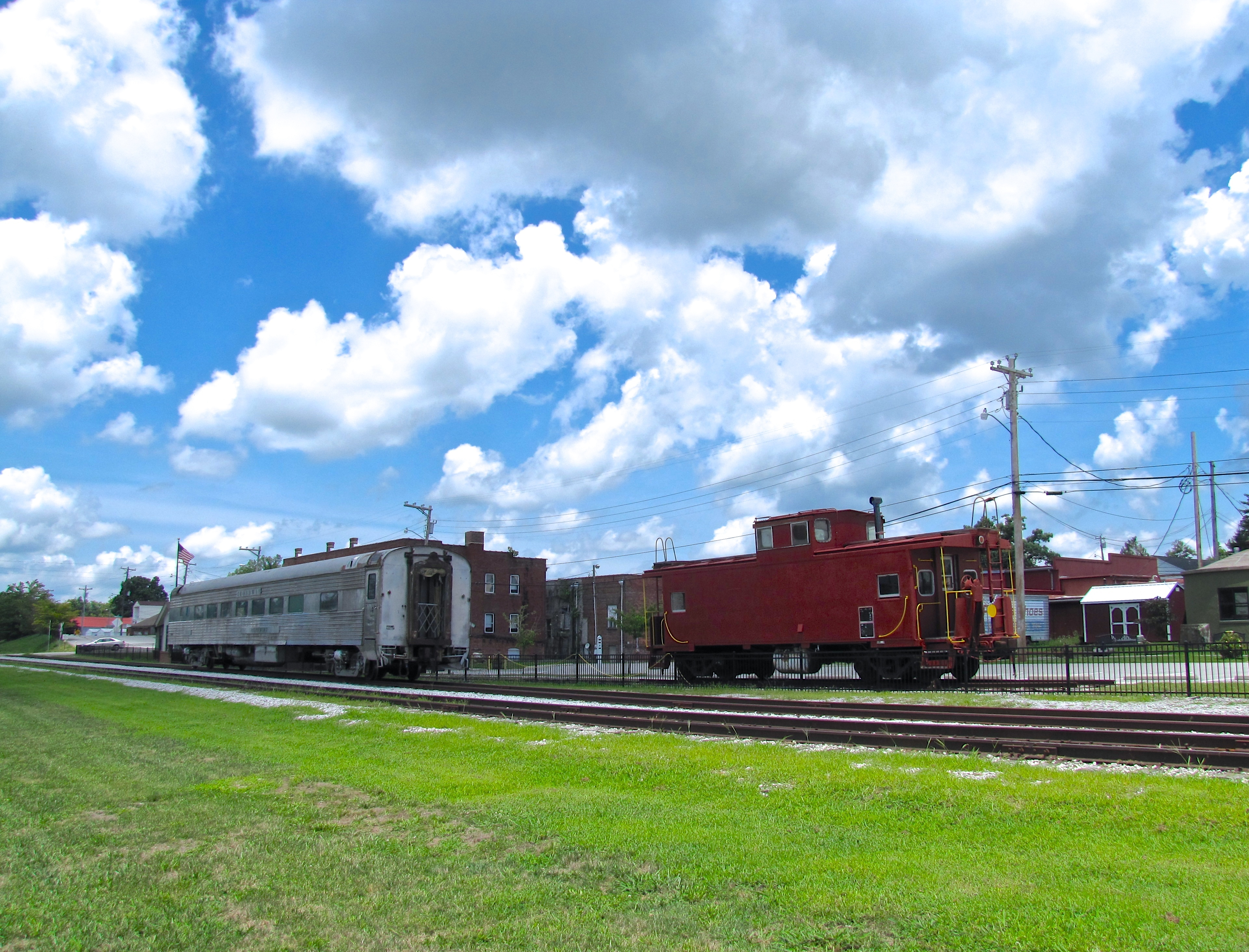
Railroad cars at the Monterey Depot

Of the 1,029 households, 31.4% had children under 18 living with them, 50.0% were married couples living together, 12.9% had a female householder with no husband present, and 32.2% were not families. About 28.4% of all households were made up of individuals, and 13.9% had someone living alone who was 65 or older. The average household size was 2.54 and the average family size was 3.06.

In the town, the age distribution was 24.7% under 18, 9.7% from 18 to 24, 26.8% from 25 to 44, 21.8% from 45 to 64, and 16.9% who were 65 or older. The median age was 37 years. For every 100 females, there were 95.0 males. For every 100 females 18 and over, there were 89.1 males.

The median income for a household in the town was $23,550, and for a family was $28,603. Males had a median income of $21,772 versus $18,895 for females. The per capita income for the town was $12,265. About 22.1% of families and 27.6% of the population were below the poverty line, including 38.4% of those under 18 and 16.5% of those 65 or over.

== Economy ==
Martin Marietta operates a large sand mine in Monterey.

== Transportation ==
The Nashville and Eastern Railroad operates freight rail service between Nashville and Monterey.

== Notable people ==
- Charlotte Burks, former Tennessee state senator
- Tommy Burks, former Tennessee representative and Tennessee state senator
- Harvie June Van, country music singer
