= Imbo railway station =

Railway station in Russia

Imbo Имбо

General information
- Location: Russia
- Coordinates: 49°23′04″N 140°03′07″E
- Owner: Russian Railways
- Operator: Russian Railways

Other information
- Status: Functioning
- Station code: 967117
- Fare zone: Far Eastern Railway

History
- Opened: 1964
Location

Imbo (Russian: Имбо) is a railway station in Khabarovsk Krai, Russia. It is located near Uska-Orochskaya.
