= Pinckney Township, Warren County, Missouri =

Inactive township in the US state of Missouri

Coordinates: 38.71°N 91.24°W

Pinckney Township is an inactive township in Warren County, in the U.S. state of Missouri.

Pinckney Township was erected in 1833, taking its name from the community of Pinckney, Missouri.
