= Calfkiller River =

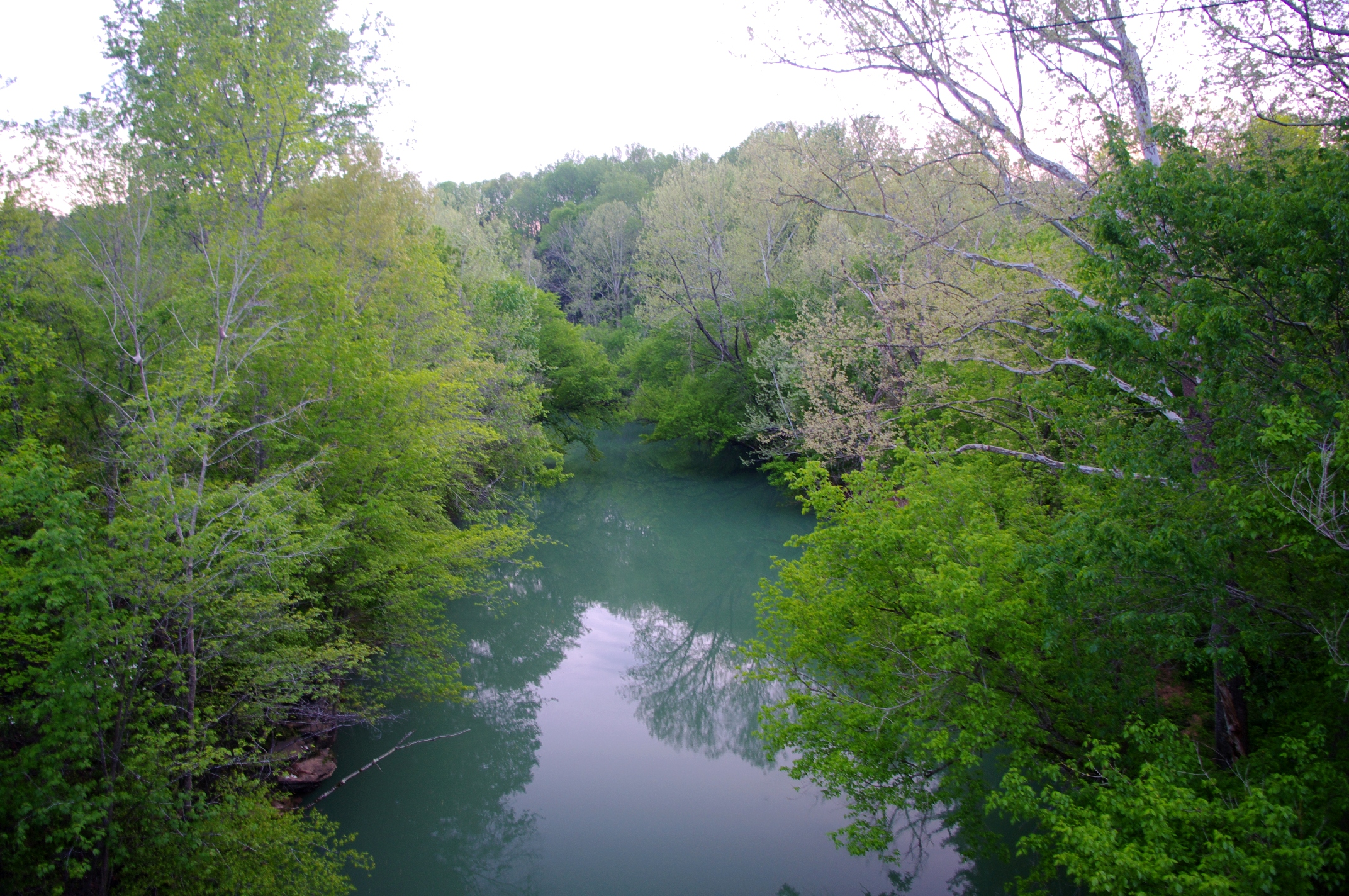
- The Calfkiller River near Sparta

Location
- Country: United States
- State: Tennessee

Physical characteristics
- Source: Stamps Hollow near Monterey
  - coordinates: 36°06′20″N 85°18′31″W
  - elevation: 980 ft (300 m)
- Mouth: Great Falls Lake (Caney Fork) south of Doyle
  - coordinates: 35°49′13″N 85°28′48″W
  - elevation: 794 ft (242 m)
- Length: 42.4 mi (68.2 km)
- Basin size: 175 mi^{2} (450 km^{2})
- Discharge
  - location: State Highway 111 in Sparta(mean for water years 2000–2005)
  - average: 558 cu ft/s (15.8 m^{3}/s)(mean for water years 2000–2005)
  - minimum: 11 cu ft/s (0.31 m^{3}/s)October 18, 1953
  - maximum: 25,000 cu ft/s (710 m^{3}/s)flood of March 1929

The Calfkiller River is a 42.4-mile-long (68.2 km) stream in the east-central portion of Middle Tennessee in the United States. It is a tributary of the Caney Fork, and is part of the Cumberland, Ohio, and Mississippi watersheds. The river is believed to be named for a Cherokee chief who once lived in the area.

== Course ==
The river rises at the base of the Cumberland Plateau, just southwest of Monterey in eastern Putnam County, with the convergence of several smaller streams that drop off the Plateau. Several of these headwater streams are impounded at the Plateau's edge, including one which forms Monterey Lake. The river then winds its way southward, slicing a broad valley in an otherwise hilly section of the Eastern Highland Rim. State Highway 84 (known as Calfkiller Highway in Putnam County and Monterey Highway in White County) runs roughly along the western bank of the river's upper section.

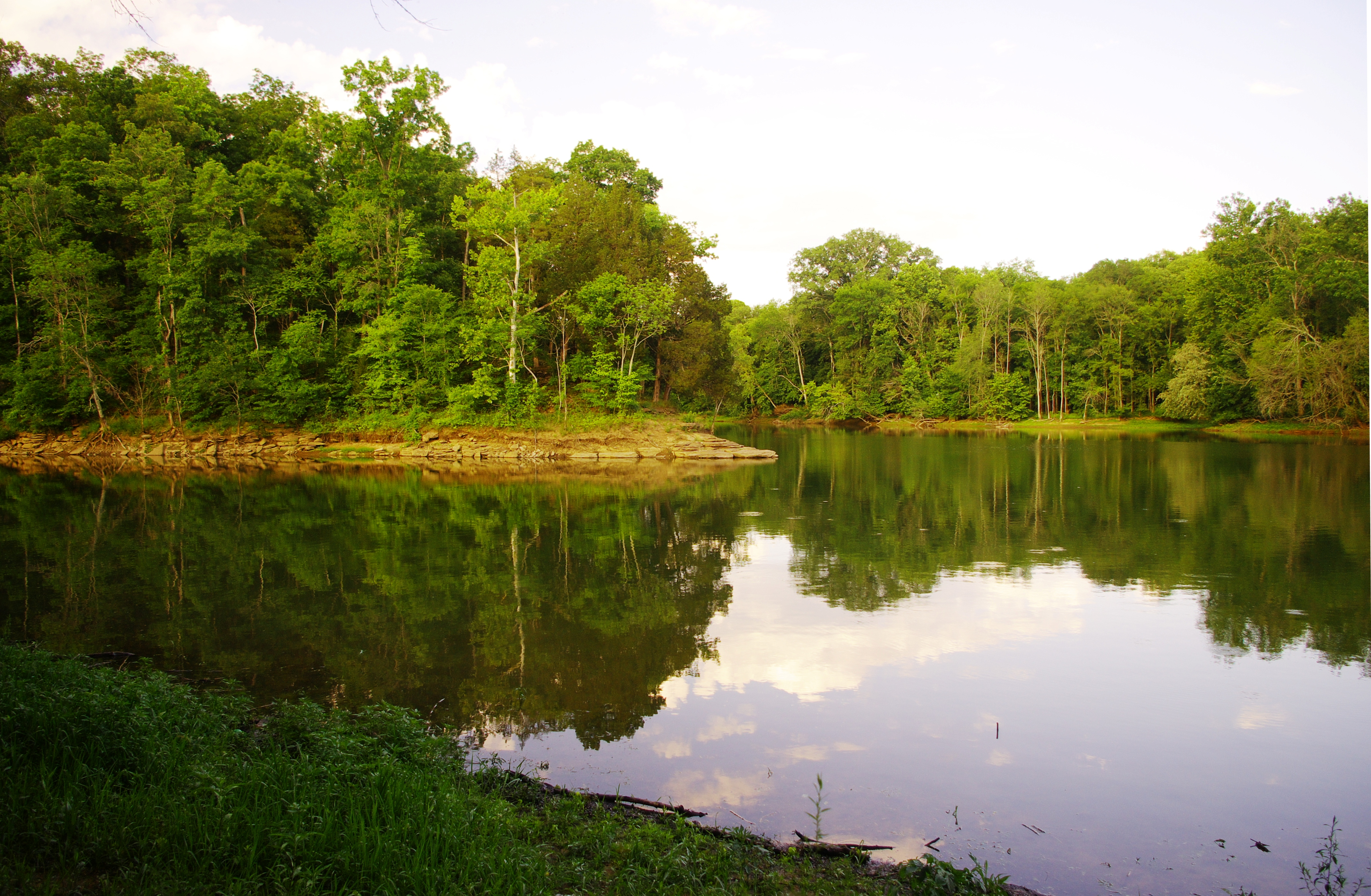
The mouth of the Calfkiller, with the Caney Fork on the right

After crossing into White County, the river's valley broadens as it veers southwestward and continues through a series of rural communities. Just south of Sparta, the river passes under Highway 84, which continues along the river's east bank. In Sparta, the river continues southward, flanked by steep embankments, especially along the east bank. The City of Sparta maintains a park along the west bank of the river on both sides of the US 70 (Bockman Way) bridge. The Old Sparta Cemetery, which rests atop a hill in downtown Sparta, offers a sweeping view of this section of the river.

Just south of Sparta, the river bends sharply around the Camp Heights area before turning southward again. The river spills over an old dam once used by the Sparta Hydroelectric Plant and passes under State Highway 111, which follows the river's eastern bank for several miles. The river then continues through rural White County, passing about a mile east of Doyle before emptying into the Caney Fork at river mile 104. This section of the Caney Fork, part of Great Falls Lake, provides the county line between White and Van Buren County. Hodges Bridge Road crosses the Caney Fork immediately downstream from the Calfkiller's mouth.

== Watershed ==
The watershed of the Calfkiller River covers 175 square miles. Several of the river's tributaries originate atop the Cumberland Plateau, including Whetstone Creek, which is part of the river's headwaters, Bridge Creek, which empties into the river just south of the Putnam-White county line, Doe Creek, which joins the river near the Big Spring community, and Wildcat Creek, which empties into the river near Sparta, and is noted for its 30-foot (9 m) waterfall visible from Highway 70 east of the town. Tributaries that enter river's western bank include Plum Creek and Cherry Creek, near the Yankeetown community, and Mill Creek, near the river's headwaters.

== History ==
According to Goodspeed's History of White County, the Calfkiller River is likely named after a Cherokee chief who lived in the valley when the first European-American settlers arrived in the area around 1800, following the American Revolutionary War. Throughout the early 19th century, they harnessed the river to power numerous small gristmills. In the years before the Civil War, an iron works and a cotton mill operated along the banks of the river in the vicinity of the current TN-111 bridge.

A number of Civil War skirmishes were fought along the Calfkiller River. On August 9, 1863, Union forces under Charles Minty attacked a Confederate scouting detachment under George Dibrell near Wildcat Creek, eventually scattering the Rebels after intense fighting. Another skirmish occurred on November 30 of that year, when a band of Confederate guerrillas unsuccessfully ambushed a detachment of the U.S. First Tennessee Cavalry at Yankeetown. On February 22, 1864, a band of Confederates under John Hughes attacked a detachment of the Fifth Tennessee Cavalry along the river, in what became known as the "Battle of Dug Hill." Hughes reportedly captured and executed over a dozen federals. Confederate guerrilla leader Champ Ferguson, who lived in the Calfkiller Valley, is buried in France Cemetery, along the banks of the river near the Putnam-White county line.

In 1902, the Sparta Light and Power Company built a small waterwheel-powered electric plant just downstream from Sparta. After this plant burned in 1907, it was replaced by a more modern plant that used a concrete dam to divert water through a flume to a powerhouse located downstream. The plant operated until the 1930s, when the Tennessee Valley Authority began providing electricity to the area from major hydroelectric projects. The dam is still visible from the TN-111 bridge, and has been listed on the National Register of Historic Places.

== See also ==
- Calfkiller Brewing Company - Sparta-based microbrewery named after the river
- Falling Water River
- List of rivers of Tennessee
