= Sparta, Tennessee =

- City
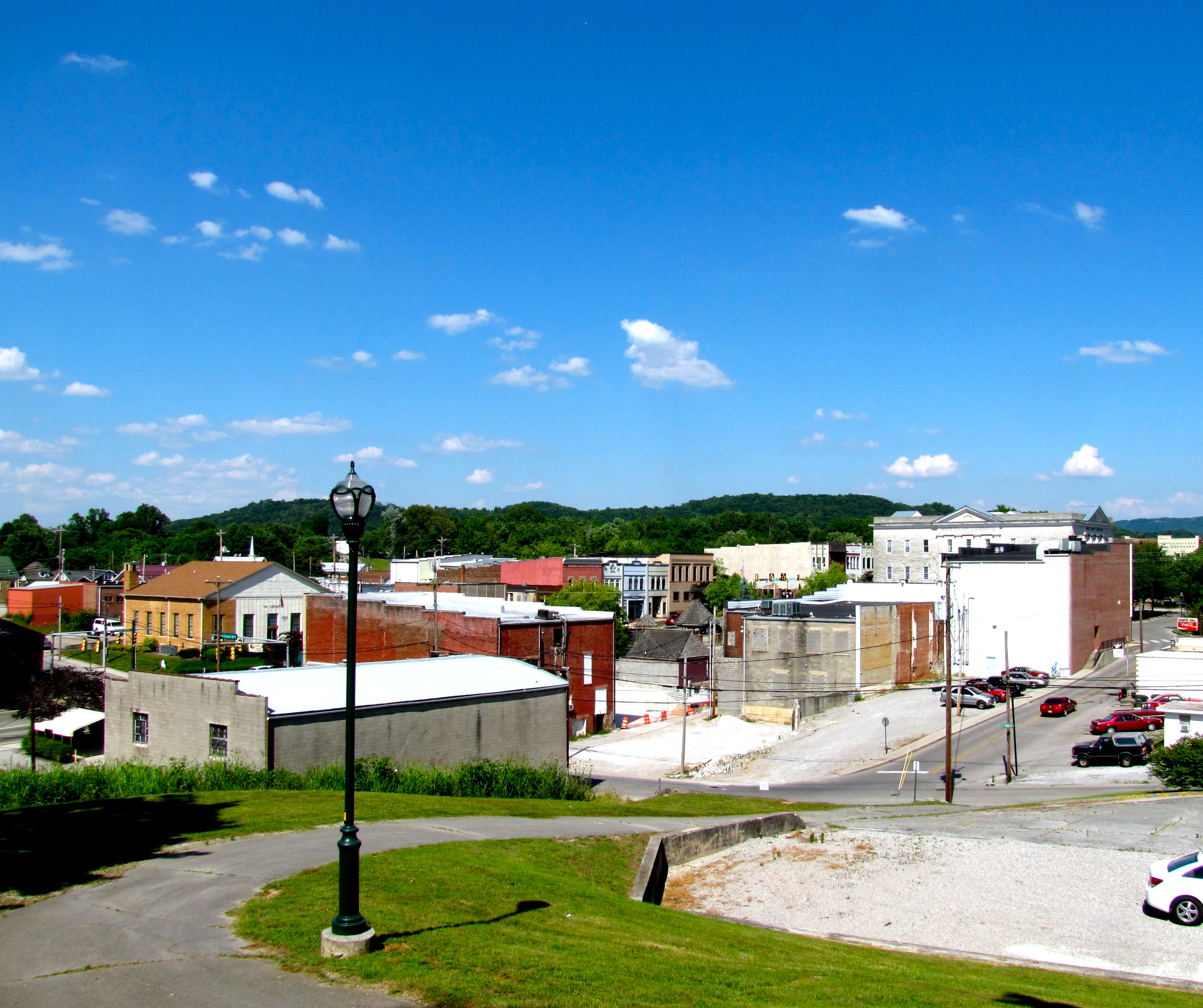
- Sparta's business district
- Nickname: Bluegrass USA
- Location of Sparta in White County, Tennessee.
- Coordinates: 35°55′56″N 85°28′11″W
- Country: United States
- State: Tennessee
- County: White

Area
  - Total: 6.72 sq mi (17.41 km^{2})
  - Land: 6.72 sq mi (17.41 km^{2})
  - Water: 0 sq mi (0.00 km^{2})
- Elevation: 919 ft (280 m)

Population (2020)
  - Total: 4,998
  - Density: 743.5/sq mi (287.05/km^{2})
- Time zone: UTC-6 (Central (CST))
  - Summer (DST): UTC-5 (CDT)
- ZIP code: 38583
- Area code: 931
- FIPS code: 47-70180
- GNIS feature ID: 1269179
- Website: www.spartatn.gov

Sparta is a city in and the county seat of White County, Tennessee, United States. The population was 5,001 in 2020.

The Calfkiller River flows through the city. Seven sites in Sparta are listed on the National Register of Historic Places.

== History ==
Sparta was established in 1809 as a county seat for White County, which had been created in 1806. The city was named after the ancient Greek city-state Sparta.

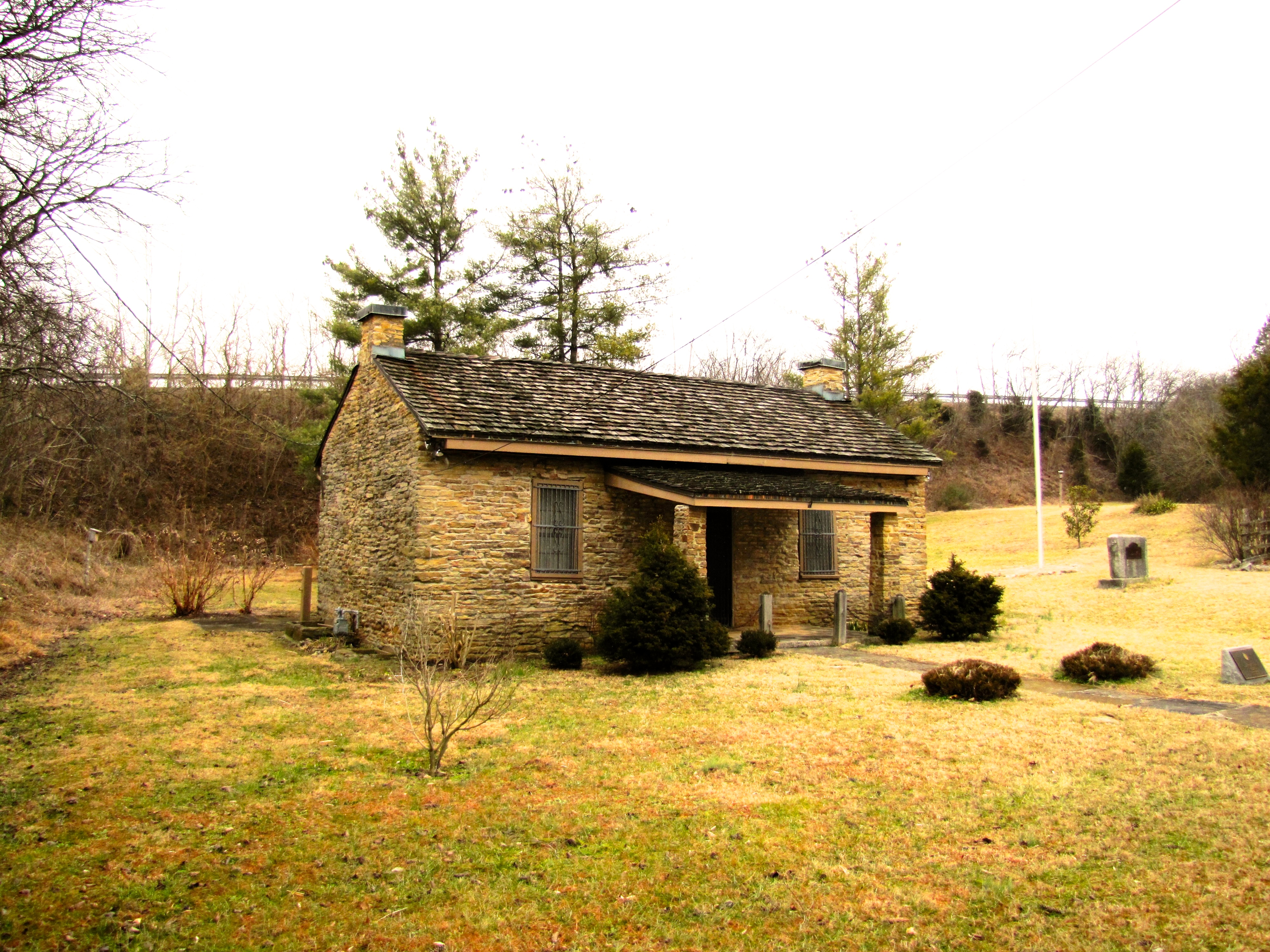
The Sparta Rock House

Sparta nearly became the capital of the state of Tennessee, as, early in the history of Tennessee, the state legislature voted to choose a location for the permanent state capital. The final vote resulted in a near tie between Sparta and Nashville. Sparta lost to Nashville by one vote.

Sparta grew quickly due to its location along the stage road between Knoxville and Nashville. In the 1830s, brothers Barlow and Madison Fisk built the Sparta Rock House, which served as an inn along the stage road. The Rock House, strategically situated in an area where the Cumberland Plateau gives way to the Calfkiller valley, was a common stopover for figures important to the early history of the state, including Andrew Jackson and Sam Houston. The building is now a state historic site and is listed on the National Register of Historic Places.

Sparta is notable as a place where two renowned airmen lost their lives. Hawthorne C. Gray, an aviation record holder, died in a balloon-basket mishap over Sparta in 1927, and Lansing Colton Holden Jr., a World War I flying ace, crashed his plane near Sparta in 1938.

Teenagers Erin Foster and Jeremy Bechtel went missing in Sparta in 2000, and were not discovered until February 2022 when scuba diver Jeremy Sides found Foster's vehicle in the Calfkiller River.

== Geography ==
Sparta is located at 35°55′56″N 85°28′11″W (35.932335, -85.469837), approximately fifteen miles south of Cookeville. The city is situated on the Highland Rim, near the western base of the Cumberland Plateau. The Calfkiller River traverses Sparta north-to-south en route to its confluence with the Caney Fork several miles to the south.

Sparta is traditionally concentrated around its courthouse square along U.S. Route 70 (signed locally as Bockman Way), which connects Sparta with Crossville to the east and Smithville to the west. State Route 111, which traverses the western part of Sparta, connects the city with Cookeville to the north and Spencer to the south. A modern commercial area has developed around the intersection of US 70 and SR 111. State Route 84 winds its away up the Calfkiller Valley, connecting Sparta with Monterey atop the Plateau to the northeast. U.S. Route 70S connects Sparta with McMinnville to the southwest.

The Upper Cumberland Regional Airport is 11 mi (18 km) north of Sparta.

According to the United States Census Bureau, the city has a total area of 6.3 square miles (16 km^{2}), all land.

== Climate ==
Sparta's climate is humid subtropical (Cfa) under the Köppen system, with mild winters and hot, humid summers. Under the Trewartha system, it is a borderline humid subtropical (Cf) and oceanic (Do) climate, supported by the fact that subtropical plants like southern magnolia and the occasional needle palm can reach their full potential here but struggle much further north.

Climate data for Sparta, Tennessee (1991–2020 normals, extremes 1961–present)
Month	Jan	Feb	Mar	Apr	May	Jun	Jul	Aug	Sep	Oct	Nov	Dec	Year
Record high °F (°C)	77 (25)	81 (27)	88 (31)	91 (33)	94 (34)	108 (42)	106 (41)	103 (39)	100 (38)	96 (36)	91 (33)	78 (26)	108 (42)
Mean maximum °F (°C)	68.2 (20.1)	72.6 (22.6)	79.1 (26.2)	85.2 (29.6)	88.7 (31.5)	93.5 (34.2)	95.2 (35.1)	94.7 (34.8)	91.9 (33.3)	85.0 (29.4)	77.8 (25.4)	69.4 (20.8)	96.4 (35.8)
Mean daily maximum °F (°C)	47.3 (8.5)	51.9 (11.1)	60.7 (15.9)	70.3 (21.3)	77.9 (25.5)	84.8 (29.3)	87.9 (31.1)	87.3 (30.7)	82.1 (27.8)	71.8 (22.1)	59.9 (15.5)	50.7 (10.4)	69.4 (20.8)
Daily mean °F (°C)	37.5 (3.1)	40.9 (4.9)	48.7 (9.3)	57.7 (14.3)	66.2 (19.0)	73.9 (23.3)	77.3 (25.2)	76.3 (24.6)	70.4 (21.3)	58.8 (14.9)	47.8 (8.8)	40.8 (4.9)	58.0 (14.4)
Mean daily minimum °F (°C)	27.8 (−2.3)	29.9 (−1.2)	36.7 (2.6)	45.1 (7.3)	54.5 (12.5)	63.1 (17.3)	66.7 (19.3)	65.3 (18.5)	58.6 (14.8)	45.8 (7.7)	35.8 (2.1)	30.9 (−0.6)	46.7 (8.2)
Mean minimum °F (°C)	8.1 (−13.3)	12.6 (−10.8)	19.3 (−7.1)	28.2 (−2.1)	38.0 (3.3)	50.6 (10.3)	56.8 (13.8)	55.7 (13.2)	43.3 (6.3)	29.2 (−1.6)	19.7 (−6.8)	14.4 (−9.8)	5.5 (−14.7)
Record low °F (°C)	−15 (−26)	−20 (−29)	6 (−14)	21 (−6)	28 (−2)	34 (1)	47 (8)	46 (8)	29 (−2)	19 (−7)	7 (−14)	−16 (−27)	−20 (−29)
Average precipitation inches (mm)	5.09 (129)	5.11 (130)	5.63 (143)	5.30 (135)	5.03 (128)	5.51 (140)	4.83 (123)	4.42 (112)	4.02 (102)	3.28 (83)	4.45 (113)	6.02 (153)	58.69 (1,491)
Average snowfall inches (cm)	1.5 (3.8)	2.5 (6.4)	0.5 (1.3)	0.0 (0.0)	0.0 (0.0)	0.0 (0.0)	0.0 (0.0)	0.0 (0.0)	0.0 (0.0)	0.0 (0.0)	0.1 (0.25)	0.4 (1.0)	5.0 (13)
Average precipitation days (≥ 0.01 in)	12.7	12.1	13.2	12.0	12.2	12.0	11.8	9.9	8.2	8.4	10.0	12.3	134.8
Average snowy days (≥ 0.1 in)	0.9	1.3	0.4	0.0	0.0	0.0	0.0	0.0	0.0	0.0	0.0	0.4	3.0
Source: NOAA

== Demographics ==
Historical population
Census	Pop.	Note	%±
1860	452		—
1870	414		−8.4%
1890	712		—
1900	895		25.7%
1910	1,409		57.4%
1920	1,517		7.7%
1930	2,211		45.7%
1940	2,506		13.3%
1950	4,299		71.5%
1960	4,510		4.9%
1970	4,930		9.3%
1980	4,864		−1.3%
1990	4,681		−3.8%
2000	4,599		−1.8%
2010	4,925		7.1%
2020	4,998		1.5%

=== 2020 census ===
As of the 2020 census, Sparta had a population of 4,998. The median age was 43.9 years. 20.5% of residents were under the age of 18 and 23.5% of residents were 65 years of age or older. For every 100 females there were 88.1 males, and for every 100 females age 18 and over there were 84.4 males age 18 and over.

98.2% of residents lived in urban areas, while 1.8% lived in rural areas.

There were 2,062 households in Sparta, of which 28.2% had children under the age of 18 living in them. Of all households, 37.1% were married-couple households, 18.9% were households with a male householder and no spouse or partner present, and 37.4% were households with a female householder and no spouse or partner present. About 34.1% of all households were made up of individuals and 19.0% had someone living alone who was 65 years of age or older.

There were 2,252 housing units, of which 8.4% were vacant. The homeowner vacancy rate was 2.2% and the rental vacancy rate was 6.4%.

Racial composition as of the 2020 census
Race	Number	Percent
White	4,279	85.6%
Black or African American	235	4.7%
American Indian and Alaska Native	21	0.4%
Asian	56	1.1%
Native Hawaiian and Other Pacific Islander	1	0.0%
Some other race	44	0.9%
Two or more races	362	7.2%
Hispanic or Latino (of any race)	205	4.1%

=== 2000 census ===
As of the census of 2000, there was a population of 4,599, with 1,952 households and 1,270 families residing in the city. The population density was 725.2 inhabitants per square mile (280.0/km^{2}). There were 2,192 housing units at an average density of 345.7 units per square mile (133.5 units/km^{2}). The racial makeup of the city was 91.82% White, 5.28% African American, 0.20% Native American, 0.65% Asian, 0.13% Pacific Islander, 0.67% from other races, and 1.24% from two or more races. Hispanic or Latino of any race were 1.15% of the population.

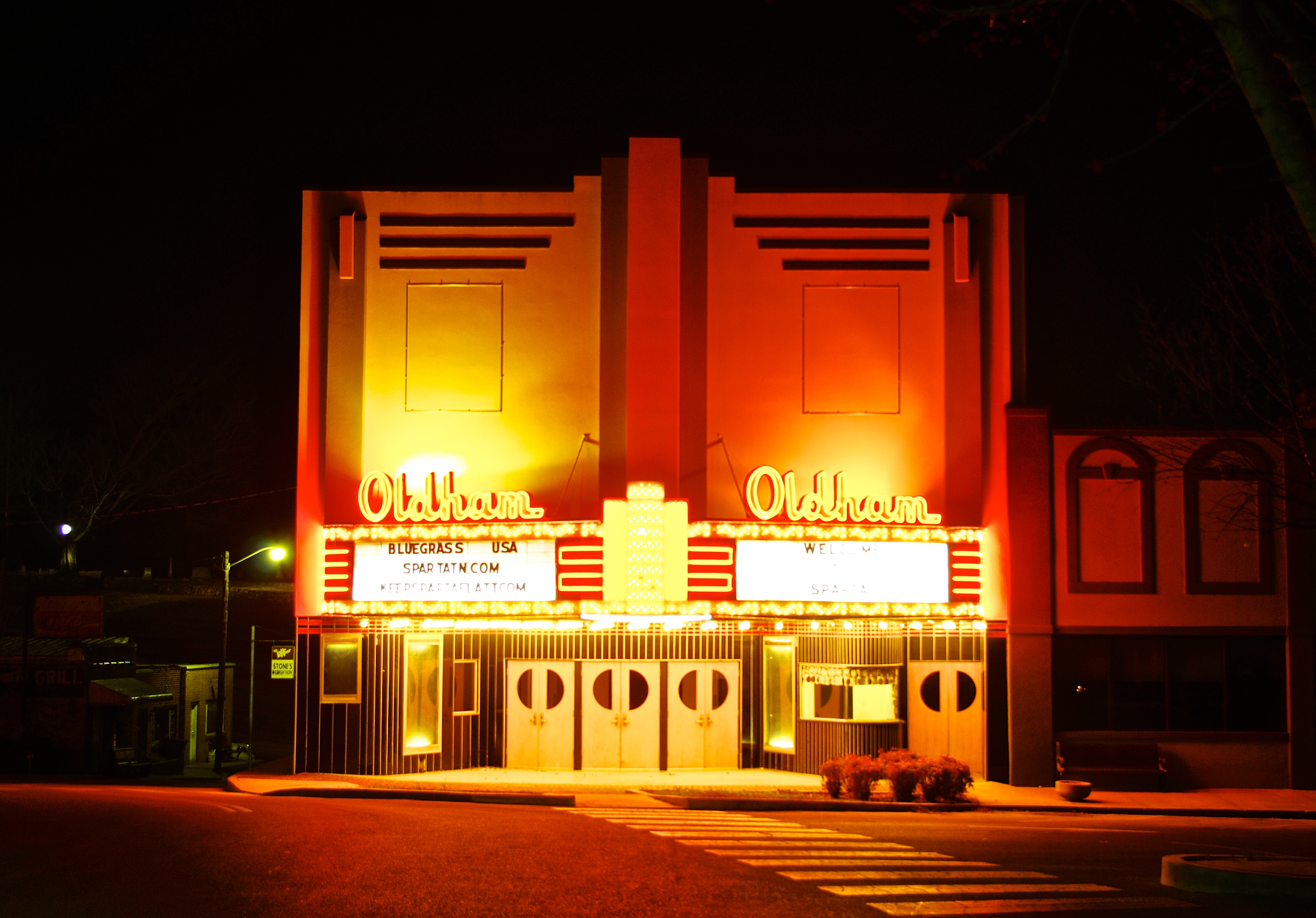
Oldham Theater

There were 1,952 households, out of which 27.6% had children under the age of 18 living with them, 43.7% were married couples living together, 17.6% had a female householder with no husband present, and 34.9% were non-families. 32.8% of all households were made up of individuals, and 17.9% had someone living alone who was 65 years of age or older. The average household size was 2.24 and the average family size was 2.81.

In the city, the population was spread out, with 21.8% under the age of 18, 7.7% from 18 to 24, 25.0% from 25 to 44, 22.9% from 45 to 64, and 22.5% who were 65 years of age or older. The median age was 41 years. For every 100 females, there were 85.1 males. For every 100 females age 18 and over, there were 77.7 males.

The median income for a household in the city was $23,775, and the median income for a family was $33,060. Males had a median income of $26,970 versus $20,295 for females. The per capita income for the city was $15,340. About 16.2% of families and 21.3% of the population were below the poverty line, including 30.3% of those under age 18 and 14.3% of those age 65 or over.

== Education ==
The White County Schools includes White County High School.

== Notable people ==
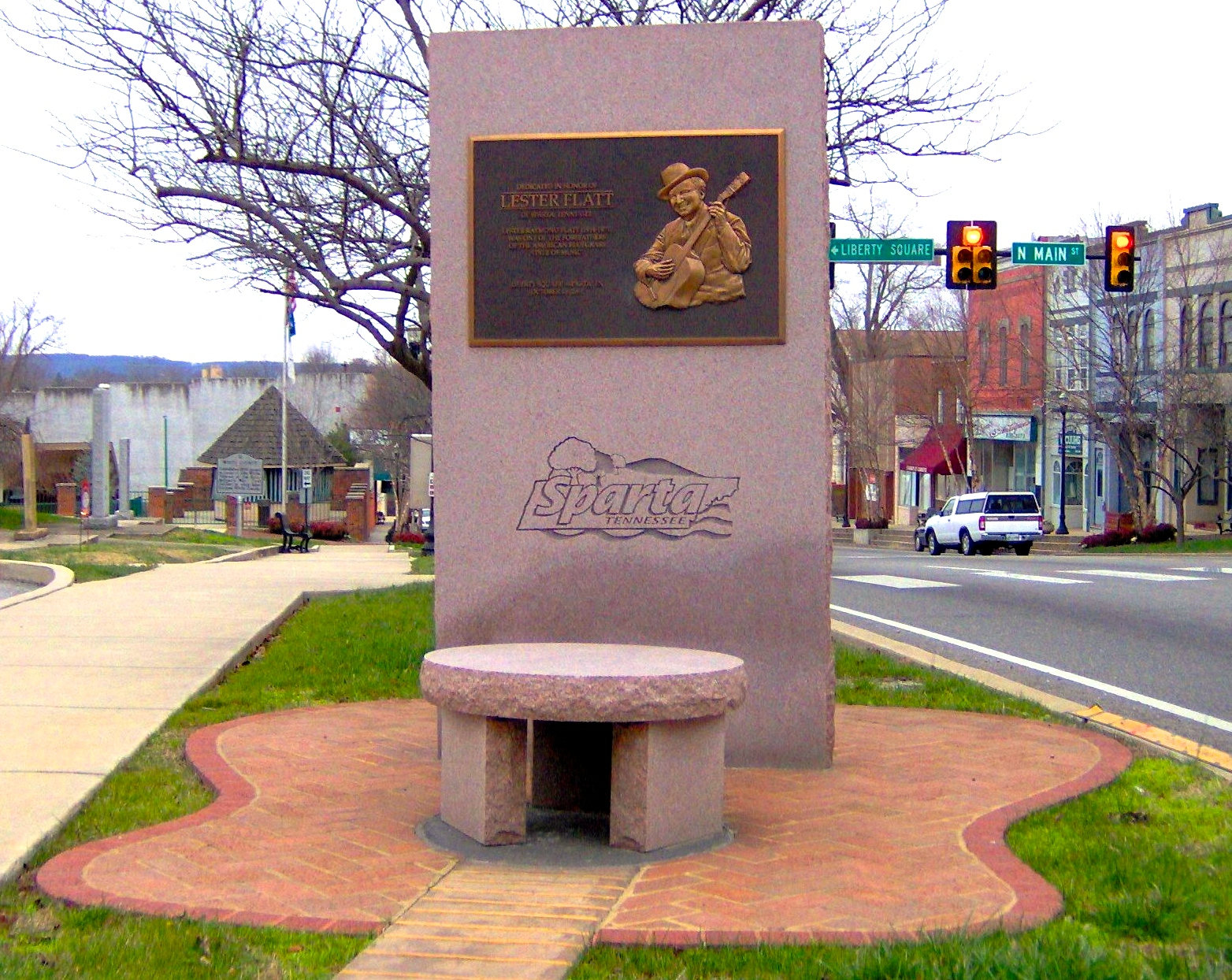
Lester Flatt Memorial in Sparta

- Foster V. Brown, U.S. Congressman
- David Culley, NFL coach
- John D. Defrees, newspaperman and politician
- George Gibbs Dibrell, Civil War general (Confederate) and U.S. Congressman
- Lester Flatt, bluegrass musician in the Foggy Mountain Boys
- John C. Floyd, U.S. Congressman
- Erin Foster and Jeremy Bechtel, Missing teenagers
- Erasmus Lee Gardenhire, politician and judge who served in the Confederate States Congress and Tennessee House of Representatives; lived his adult life in Sparta
- Kellie Harper, Head coach of University of Missouri women's basketball; former player and head coach of Tennessee Lady Vols basketball; grew up in Sparta
- Benny Martin, bluegrass musician who invented the eight string fiddle
- Ethan Roberts, Major League Baseball pitcher
- Tom Rogers, Major League Baseball pitcher
- Charles Edward Snodgrass, U.S. Congressman; uncle of Henry C. Snodgrass
- Henry C. Snodgrass, U.S. Congressman
- Lefty Stewart, Major League Baseball pitcher
- James W. Throckmorton, 12th Governor of Texas and U.S. Congressman
- Earl Webb, Major League Baseball outfielder
