= Tennessee State Route 28 =

State highway in Tennessee, United States

State Route 28
- SR 28; primary in red, unsigned in green

Route information
- Maintained by TDOT
- Length: 132.37 mi (213.03 km)
- Existed: October 1, 1923–present
- Tourist routes: Sequatchie Valley Scenic Byway

Major junctions
- South end: I-24 at Jasper
- US 41 / US 64 / US 72 at Jasper; US 127 at Dunlap; SR 8 / SR 111 near Dunlap; US 70 at Crossville; I-40 at Crossville; SR 52 near Jamestown
- North end: US 127 / SR 111 at the Kentucky state line at Static

Location
- Country: United States
- State: Tennessee
- Counties: Marion, Sequatchie, Bledsoe, Cumberland, Fentress, Pickett

Highway system
- Tennessee State Routes; Interstate; US; State
← SR 27	→ SR 29

State Route 28 (SR 28) is a state highway in the state of Tennessee, traversing the state in a north–south axis from south of Jasper to the Kentucky state line at Static.

== Route description ==
=== Marion County ===
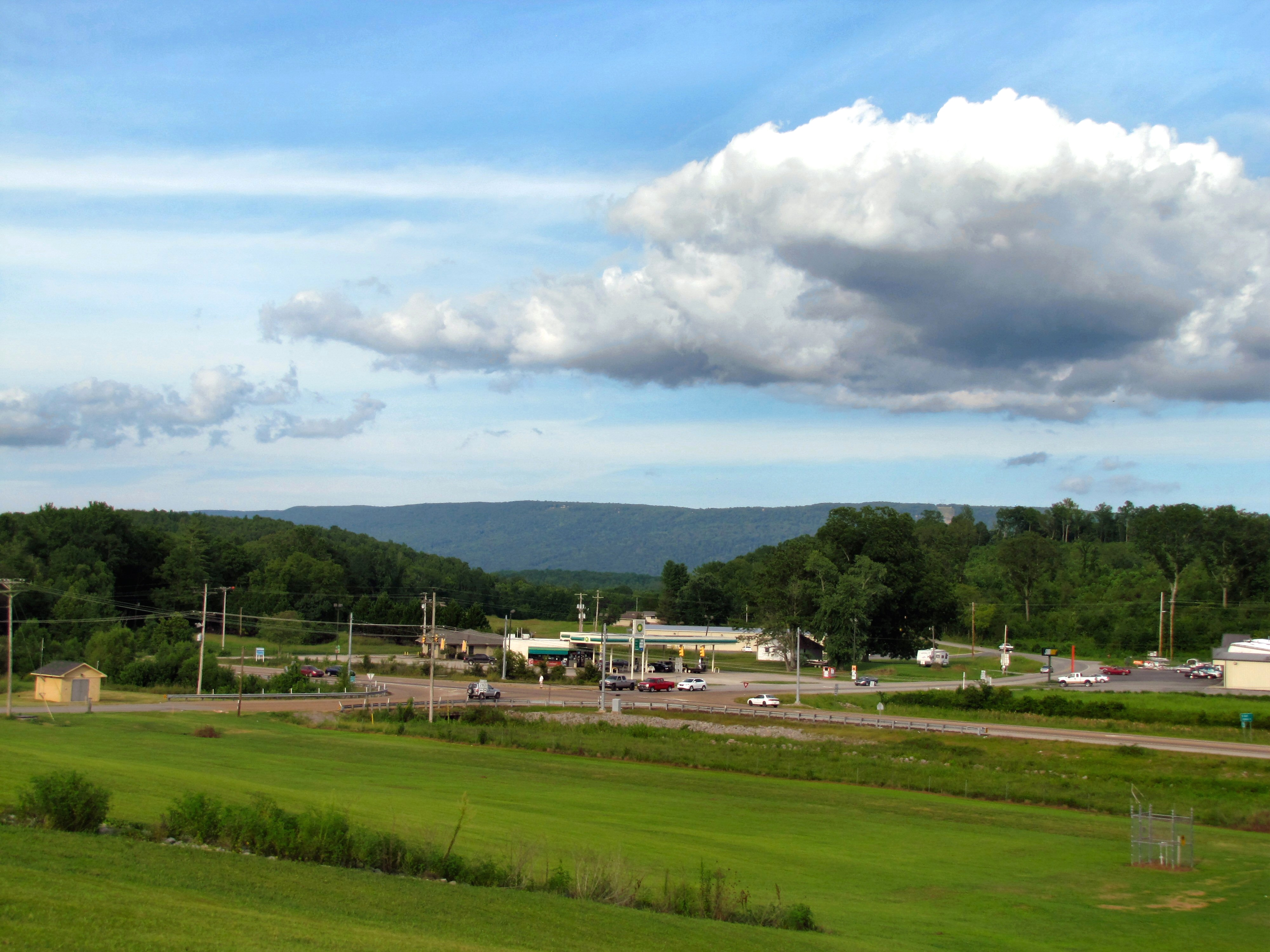
View looking east across the intersection of Tennessee State Route 28 and Tennessee State Route 283 in Whitwell. The Cumberland Plateau's Walden Ridge section is in the distant background.

SR 28 begins just south of Jasper at an interchange with I-24/SR 27 (Exit 155) in Marion County. It then goes north as a 4-lane divided highway to have an interchange with US 41/US 64/US 72/SR 2, where it becomes concurrent with US 41, in Jasper before bypassing downtown to the east and continuing north and narrowing to a 2-lane. Between both of the aforementioned interchanges, SR 28 has an unsigned concurrency with SR 27. The highway then has an intersection with unsigned SR 150, where US 41 splits off, before leaving Jasper and continuing north. It then travels up the Sequatchie Valley, parallel to the Sequatchie River, and passes through Sequatchie, where it crosses the Little Sequatchie River, before entering Whitwell at an intersection with SR 283. It then has an intersection with SR 108 before going through downtown and leaving Whitwell to go down a long, narrow valley full of farmland. SR 28 then crosses into Sequatchie County.

=== Sequatchie County ===
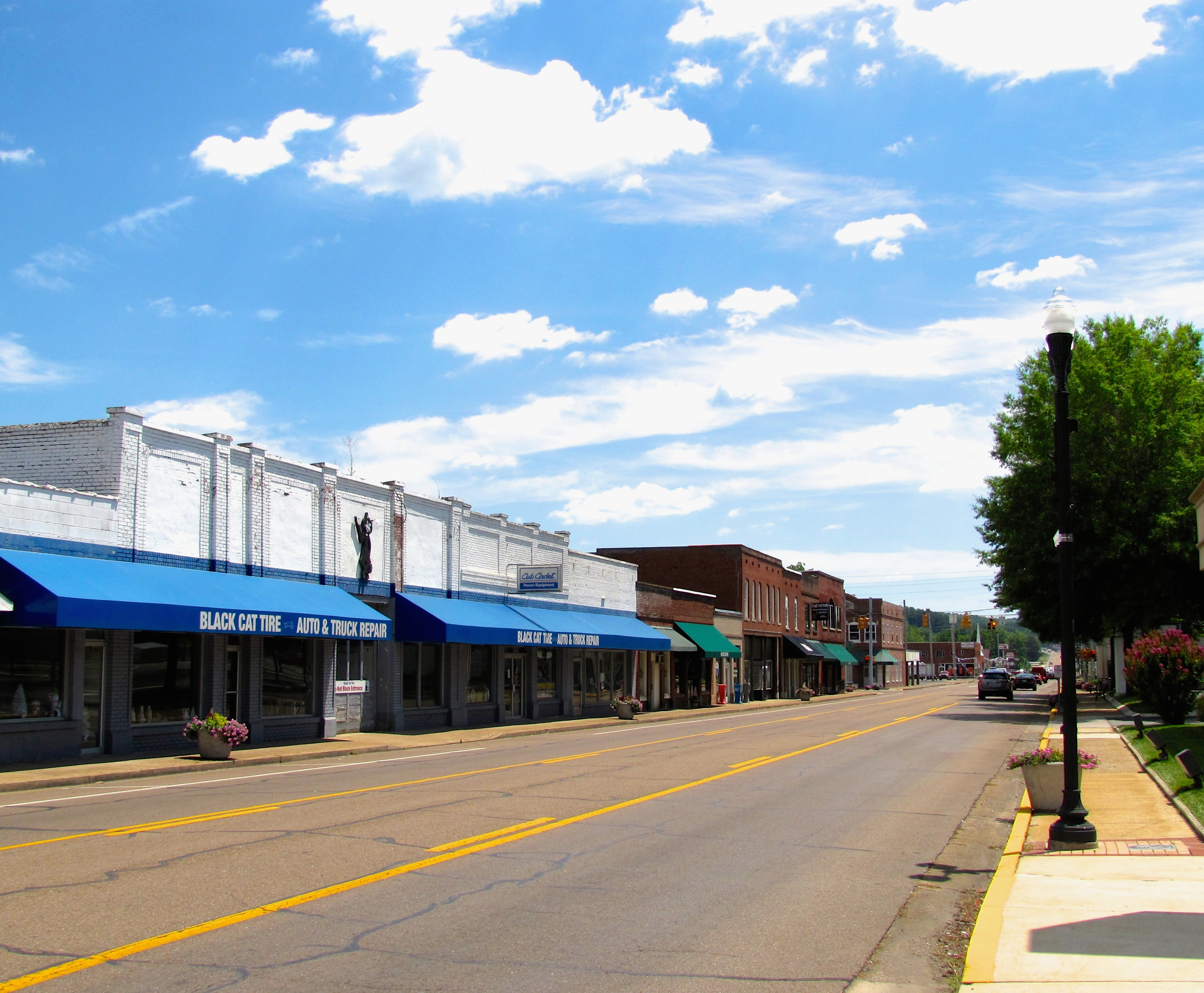
Businesses along Rankin Avenue (US 127/SR 8/SR 28) in downtown Dunlap, Tennessee.

SR 28 then goes north to leave the Sequatchie River before it enters Dunlap and has a y-intersection with US 127/SR 8. From this point on, SR 28 is the unsigned companion route of US 127 from Dunlap to the state line at Static. US 127/SR 8/SR 28 then go north through downtown to an interchange with SR 111, with SR 8 splitting off here to go west on SR 111. US 127/SR 28 then go through some farmland before entering Bledsoe County.

=== Bledsoe County ===
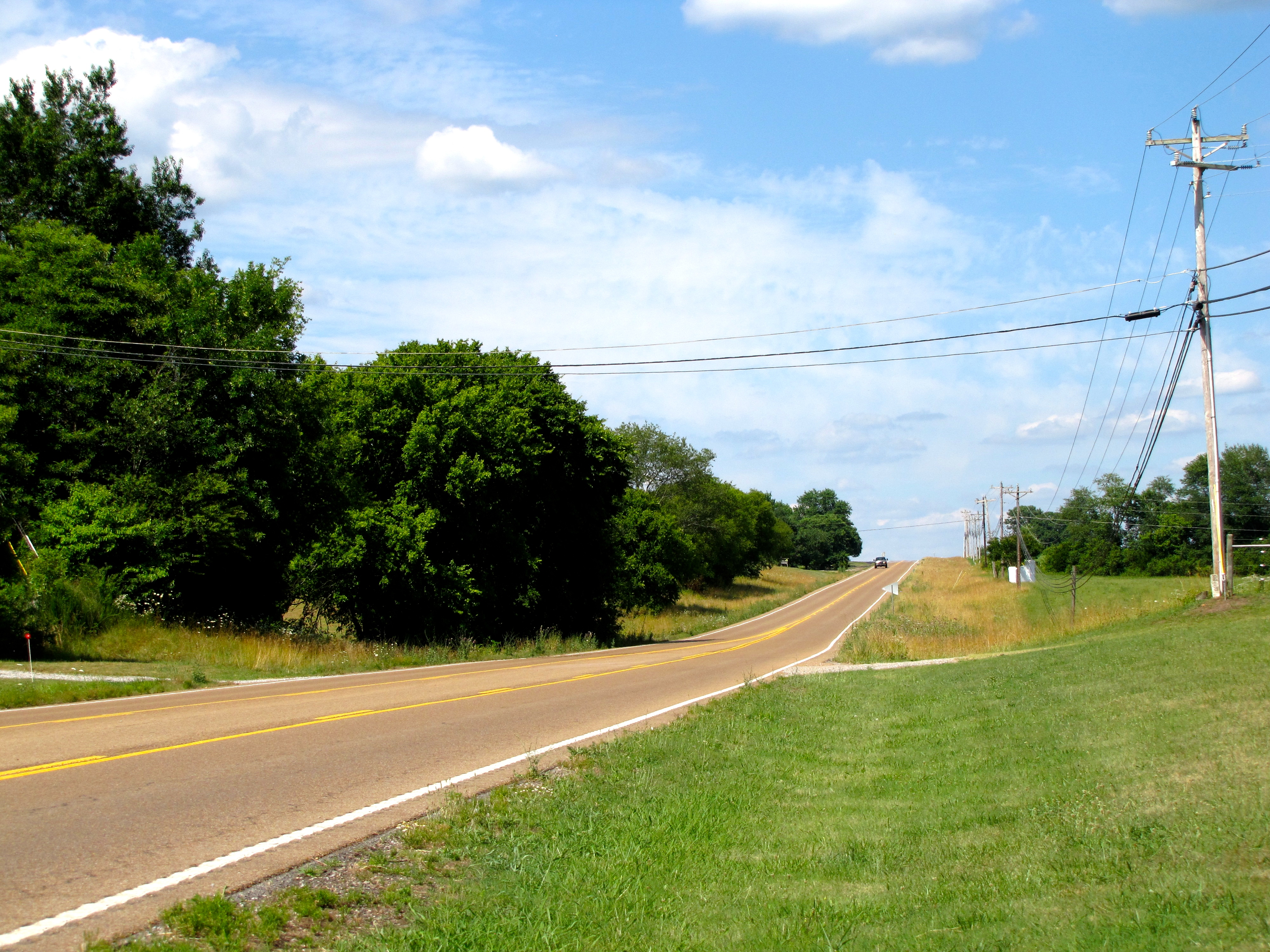
US 127 and SR 28 near Lees Station.

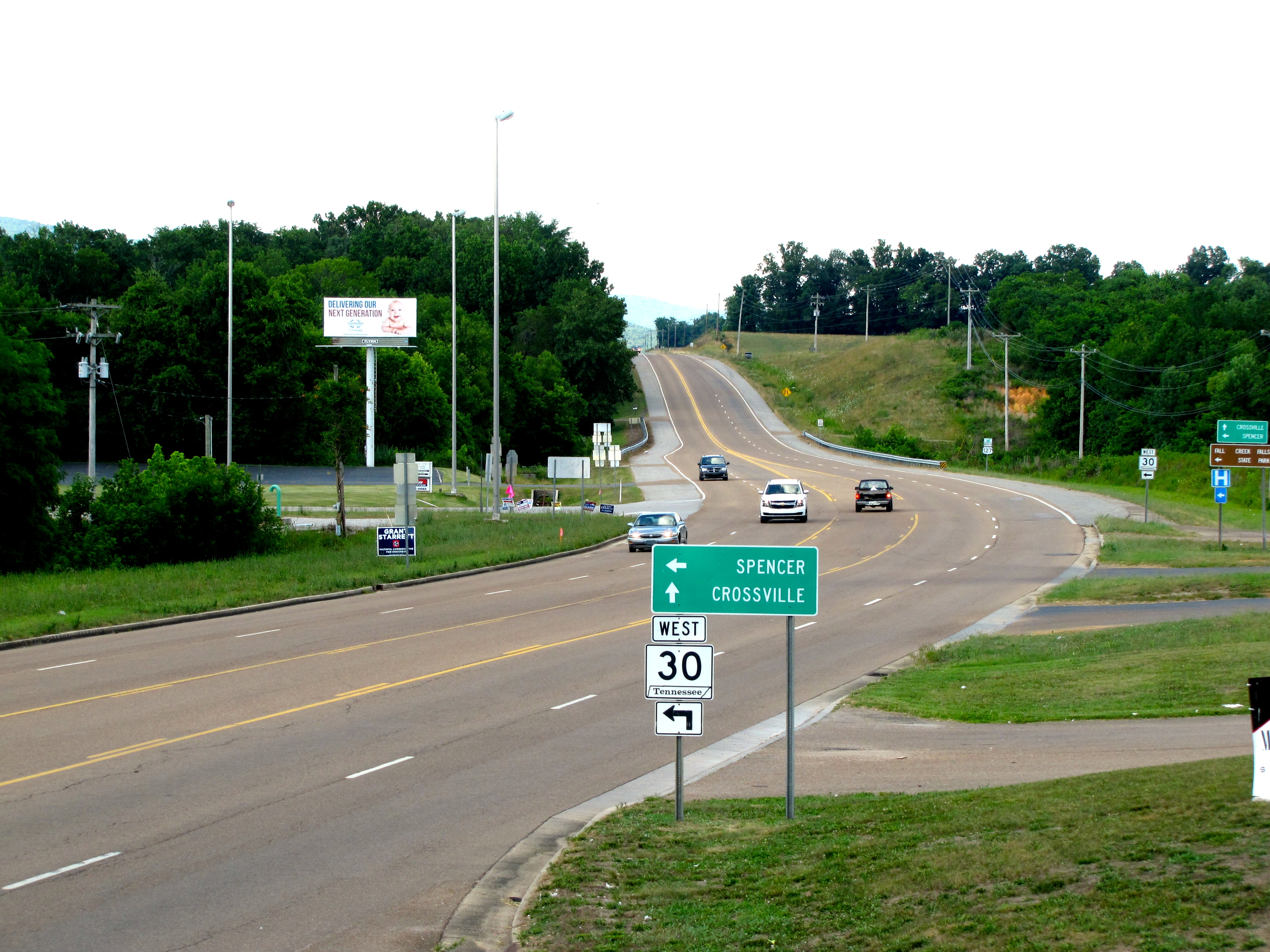
The intersection of U.S. Route 127 and Tennessee State Route 30 in Pikeville, looking north.

The highway now passes through Palio, Lusk, and Lees Station before entering Pikeville at an intersection with SR 30. They then become concurrent with each other to bypass downtown as a 4-Lane undivided highway before splitting off to the west, with US 127/SR 28 narrowing back to 2-lanes and continuing north through farmland to pass through Cold Spring and Melvine before pulling away from the Sequatchie River and ascending onto the Cumberland Plateau and entering Cumberland County.

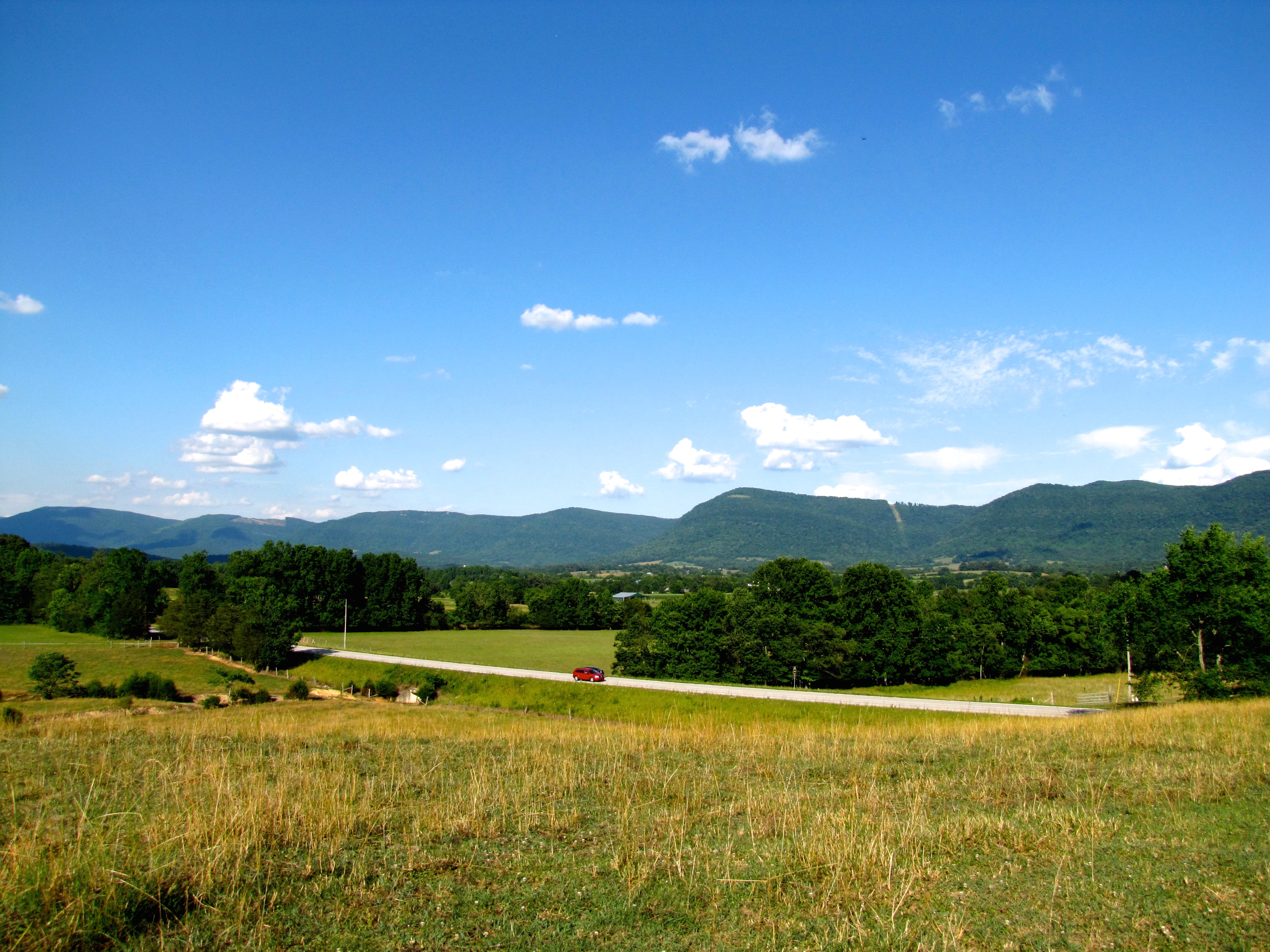
View of northern Bledsoe County, Tennessee, looking northeast from Edmons Road (marked as Lone Oak Road on maps). The Cumberland Plateau (Walden Ridge) spans the horizon. U.S. Route 127/Tennessee State Route 28 is below.

=== Cumberland County ===
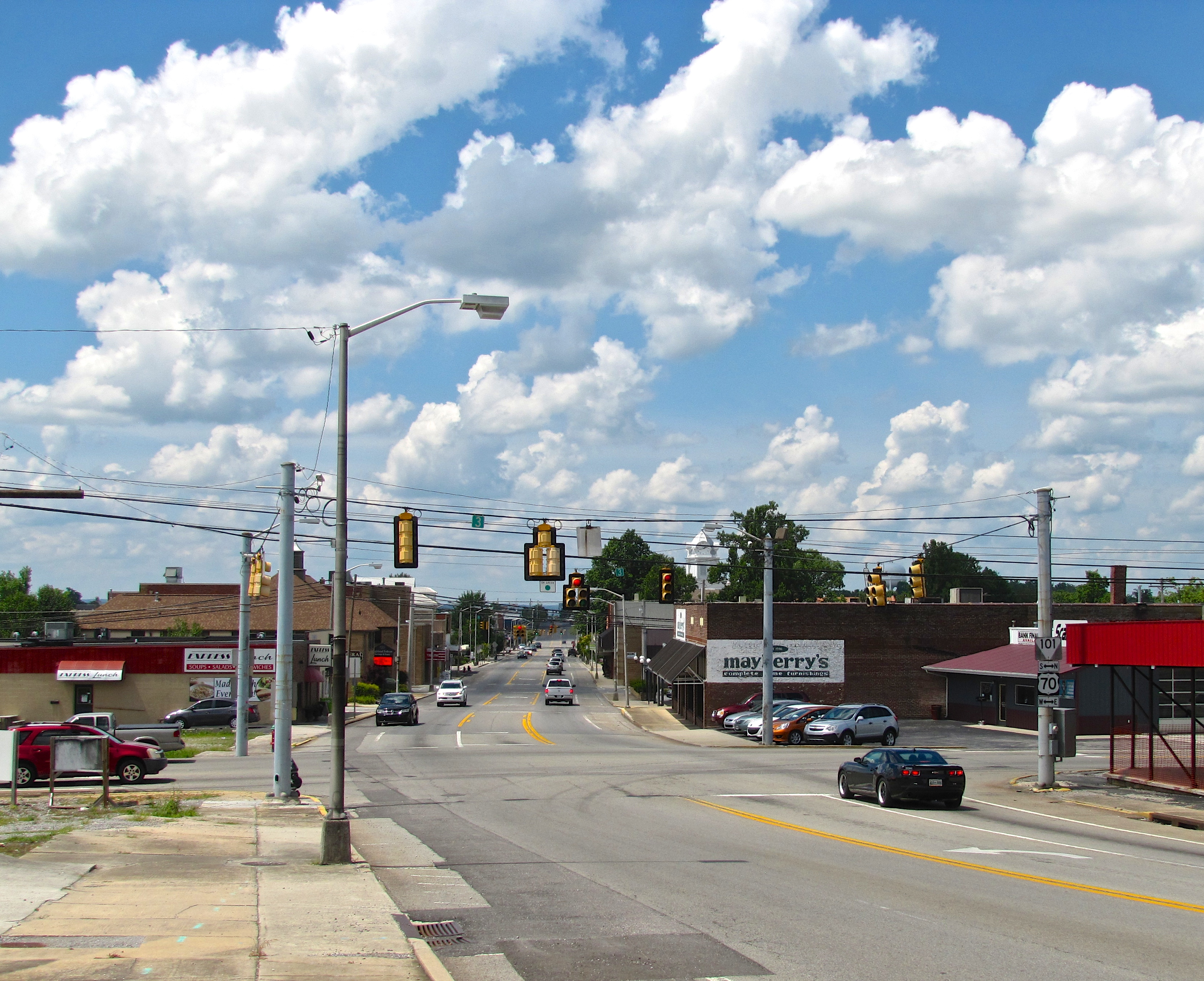
View along Main Street (US 127/SR 28) in Crossville, Tennessee, at its intersection with Lantana Road (US 70/SR 1/SR 101).

US 127/SR 28 immediately have an intersection with Vandever Road, which is a connector to SR 282 and Lake Tansi Village. They then go through more farmland before passing by Cumberland Mountain State Park and having an intersection with SR 419. The highway now passes through Cumberland Homesteads, where it has a y-intersection with SR 68, and US 127/SR 28 turn northeast to enter Crossville. US 127/SR 28 intersect SR 392 (a beltway around downtown) before entering downtown and having an intersection with US 70/SR 1/SR 101. They then pass through downtown before widening to a 4-lane and junctioning with SR 298. US 127/SR 28 then have an intersection with US 70N/SR 24 before going through Crossville's main business district, crossing the Obed River and coming to an interchange with I-40 (Exit 317). US 127/SR 28 then leave Crossville, narrowing to 2-lanes, and continue north through more farmland. They then cross into Fentress County via a couple of sharp switchbacks to negotiate a bridge over Clear Creek.

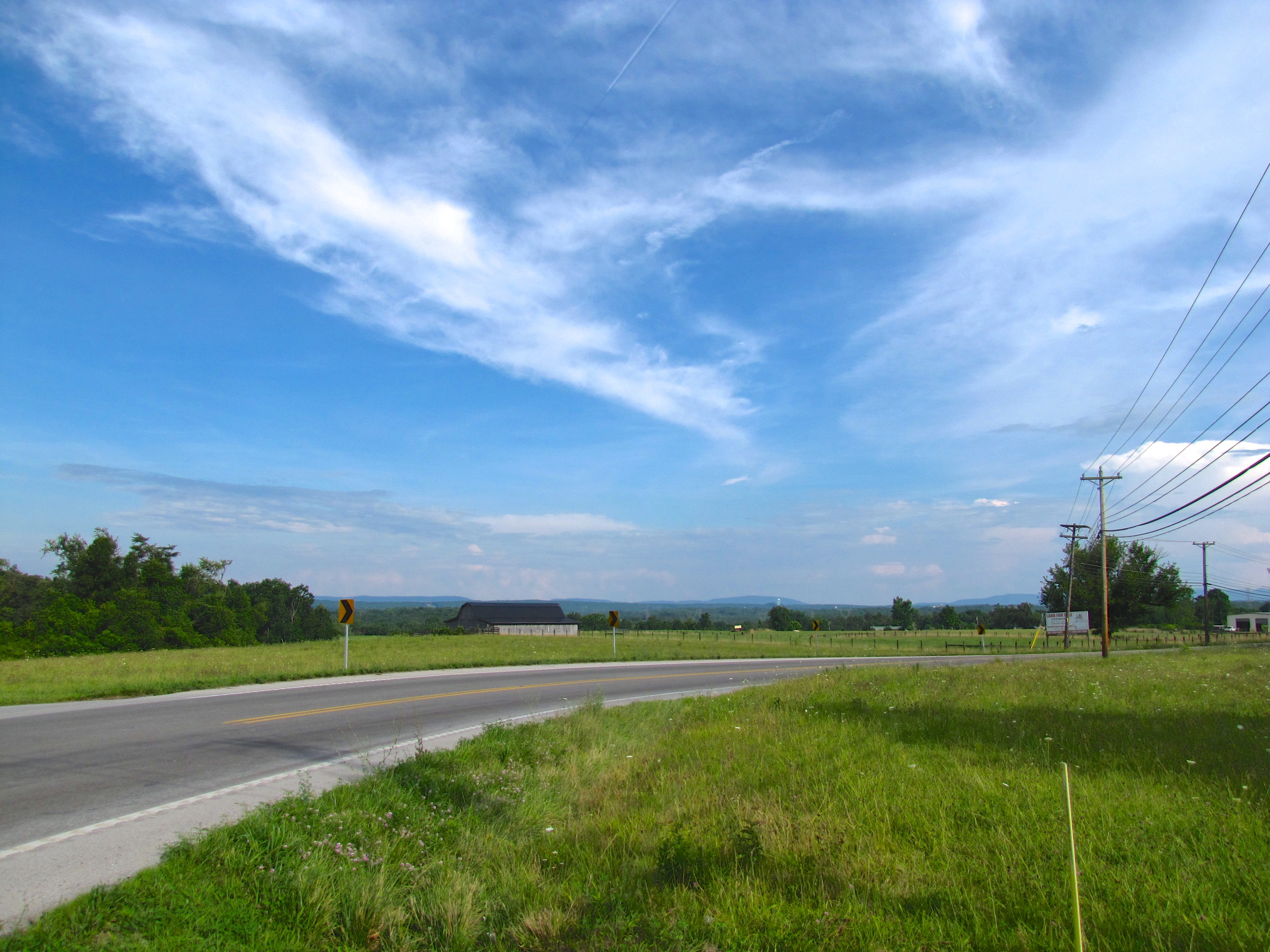
View along U.S. Route 127/State Route 28, looking south from the Woody area of northern Cumberland County, Tennessee, United States.

=== Fentress County ===
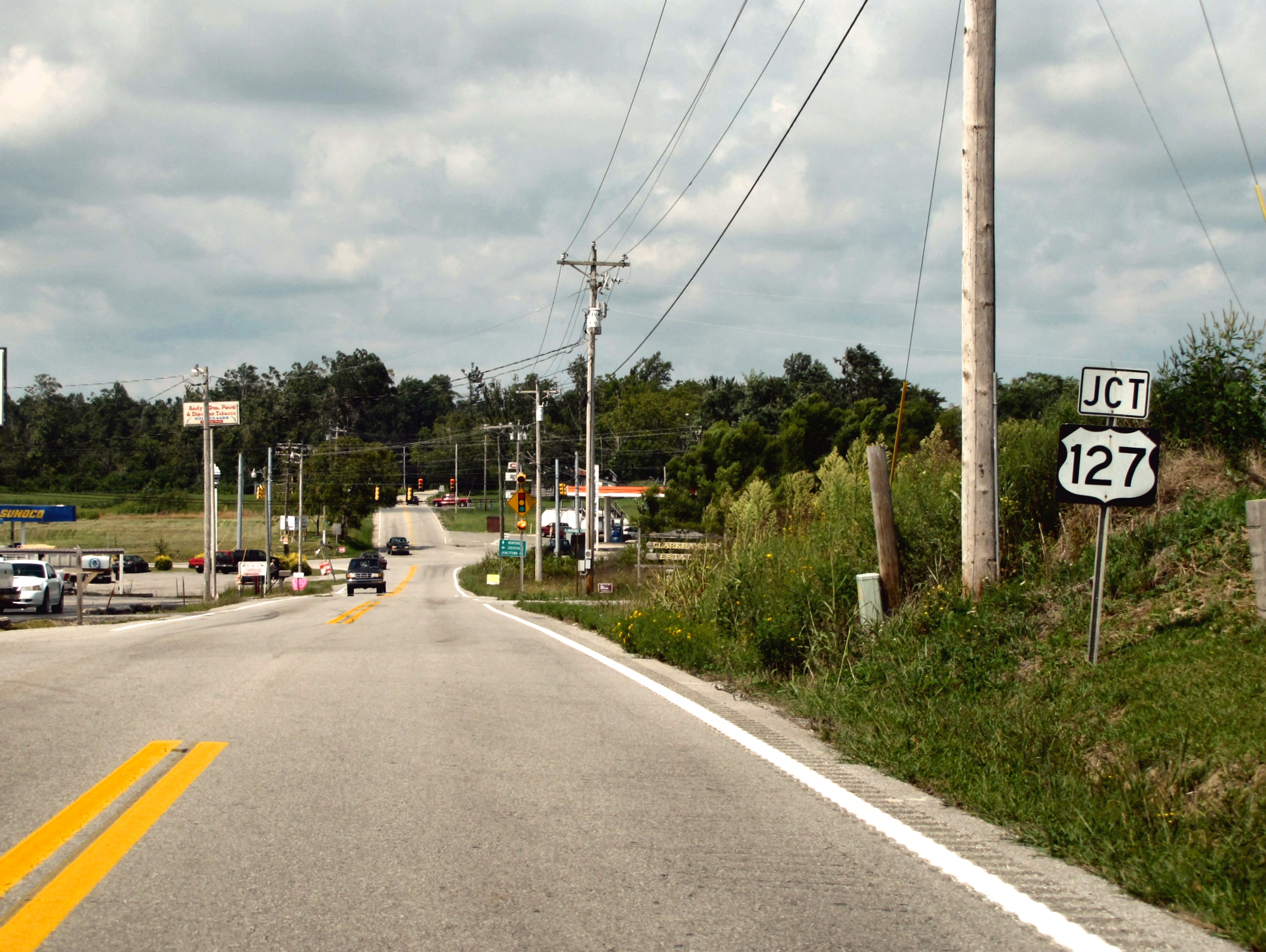
The intersection of U.S. Route 127 and Tennessee State Route 62 in Clarkrange.

US 127/SR 28 then go through more farmland before entering Clarkrange to have an intersection with SR 62. US 127/SR 28 then passes through Clarkrange before having an intersection with SR 85 and entering Grimsley. They then pass through Grimsley before widening to a 4-lane to pass by Jamestown Municipal Airport and intersect SR 296 west of Allardt. They then enter Jamestown and bypass downtown (beginning with the intersection with Main Street (Old US 127/SR 28) to the east. The first have an interchange with SR 52 before having one with SR 154. They then leave Jamestown, at the other end of Main Street (Old US 127/SR 28), and continue north and narrow to a 2-lane. They then pass through Sgt. Alvin C. York State Historic Park and Pall Mall, where the highway crosses the Wolf River and has an intersection with Caney Creek Road (connector to Kentucky Route 200), before crossing into Pickett County.

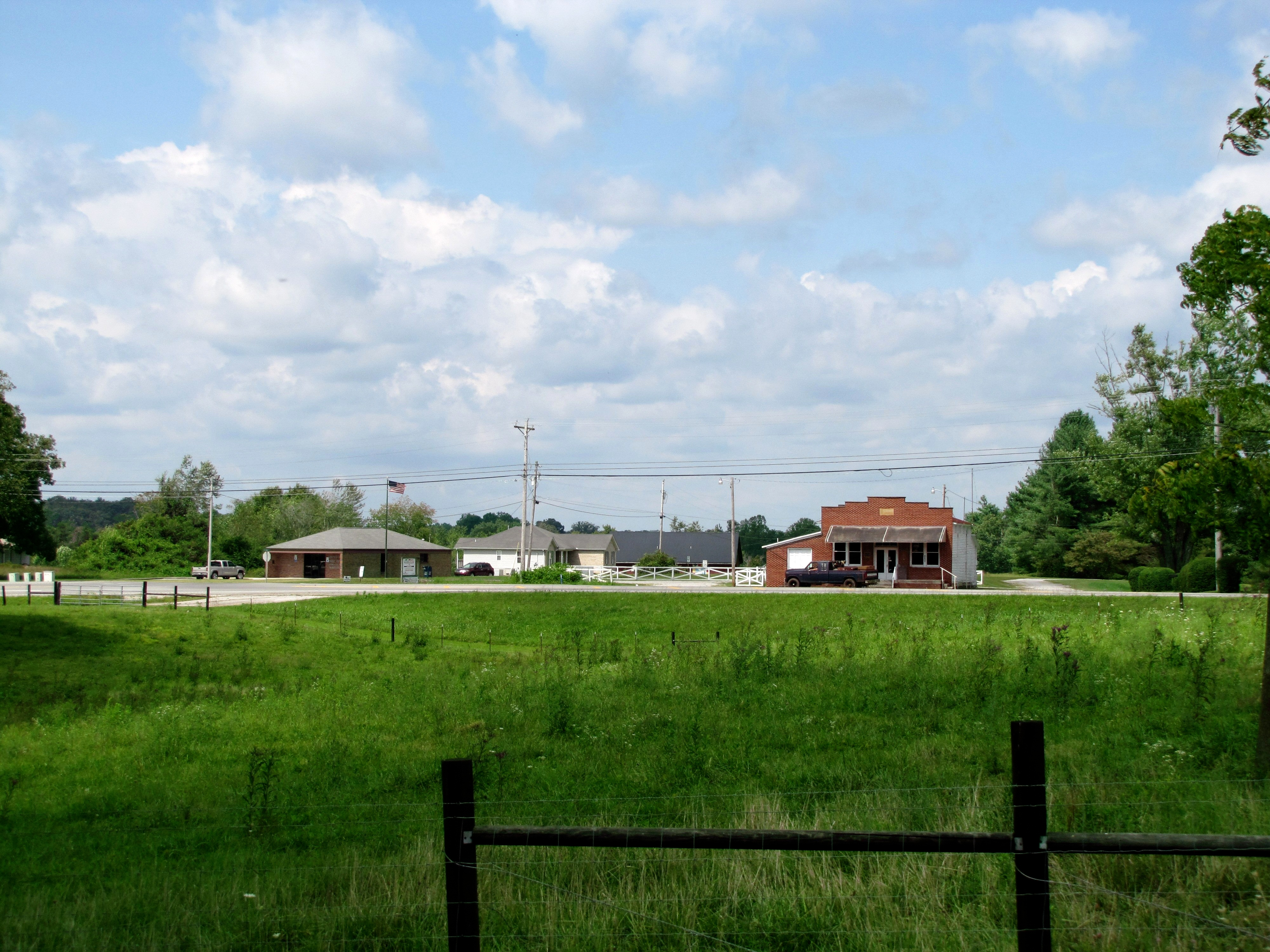
Post office (left) and old Beaty General Store (right) along US 127/SR 28 in the Grimsley community of Fentress County, Tennessee.

=== Pickett County ===
The highway winds it way through rural areas for several miles to intersect with SR 325, and then SR 295, before entering Static and intersecting both Kentucky Route 1076 (KY 1076) and SR 111 immediately before crossing the state line into Kentucky, with SR 28 ending here and US 127 continuing into Kentucky.

== History ==
In December 2021, SR 28's course from Jasper to Crossville was designated the Sequatchie Valley Scenic Byway, part of the National Scenic Byway system.

== Major intersections ==
County	Location	mi	km	Destinations	Notes
Marion	Jasper	0.0	0.0	I-24 (SR 27 east) – Nashville, Chattanooga	I-24 exit 155
Marion	Jasper			US 41 south / US 64 / US 72 (Main Street/SR 2/SR 27 west) – Kimball, Haletown	Interchange; northern end of unsigned SR 27 concurrency; southern end of US 41 concurrency
Marion	Jasper			US 41 north (SR 150 north) – Tracy City	Southern terminus of unsigned SR 150; northern end of US 41 concurrency
Marion	Whitwell			SR 283 north – Powells Crossroads	Southern terminus of SR 283
Marion	Whitwell			SR 108 north (S Main Street) – Palmer, Gruetli-Laager	Southern terminus of SR 108
Sequatchie	Dunlap			US 127 south (Rankin Avenue/SR 8 south) – Fairmount, Walden, Signal Mountain	Y-Intersection; southern end of US 127/SR 8 concurrency; SR 28 becomes unsigned
Sequatchie	Dunlap			SR 8 north / SR 111 – Cookeville, Chattanooga	Interchange; northern end of SR 8 concurrency
Bledsoe	Pikeville			SR 30 east – Dayton	Southern end of SR 30 concurrency
Bledsoe	Pikeville			SR 30 west – Spencer, Fall Creek Falls State Park	Northern end of SR 30 concurrency
Cumberland				Vandever Road to SR 282 – Lake Tansi Village	Connector to SR 282 and Lake Tansi Village
Cumberland	Cumberland Homesteads			SR 419 north (Pigeon Ridge Road) – Cumberland Mountain State Park	Southern terminus of SR 419
Cumberland	Cumberland Homesteads			SR 68 south – Spring City	Northern terminus of SR 68
Cumberland	Crossville			SR 392 (Miller Avenue)	Beltway around downtown Crossville
Cumberland	Crossville			US 70 / SR 101 (Lantana Road/SR 1) – Sparta, Lake Tansi Village, Fairfield Glade, Crab Orchard	
Cumberland	Crossville			SR 298 north (Genesis Road) to I-40	Southern terminus of SR 298
Cumberland	Crossville			SR 392 south (Miller Avenue)	Northern terminus of SR 392; beltway around downtown Crossville
Cumberland	Crossville			US 70N west (Elmore Road/SR 24 west) – Monterey	Eastern terminus of US 70N and unsigned SR 24
Cumberland	Crossville			SR 462 south (Northside Drive/Interstate Drive)	Northwest Connector
Cumberland	Crossville			I-40 – Knoxville, Nashville	I-40 Exit 317
Fentress	Clarkrange			SR 62 (Clarkrange Highway/Deer Lodge Highway) – Monterey, Wartburg	
Fentress	Grimsley			SR 85 west (Wilder Road) – Livingston	Eastern terminus of SR 85
Fentress				SR 296 east (Taylor Place Road) – Allardt	Western terminus of SR 296
Fentress	Jamestown			Old U.S. 127 (South Main Street)	
Fentress	Jamestown			SR 52 (East Central Avenue/Allardt Highway) – Jamestown, Allardt, Rugby	Interchange
Fentress	Jamestown			SR 154 (Pickett Parks Highway) – Jamestown, Pickett State Park, Big South Fork National River and Recreation Area, Monticello, KY	Interchange
Fentress	Jamestown			Old US 127 (North York Highway, North Main Street)	
Fentress	Pall Mall			Caney Creek Road to KY 200 – Monticello	Caney Creek Road becomes KY 200 at the state line
Pickett				SR 325 west (Red Hill Road) – Byrdstown	Eastern terminus of SR 325
Pickett				SR 295 west (Parker Road) – Byrdstown	Eastern terminus of SR 295
Pickett	Static			KY 1076 north	Intersection right on the state line; southern terminus of KY 1076
Pickett	Static	132.37	213.03	SR 111 south – Livingston, Byrdstown US 127 north – Albany, Jamestown	Northern terminus of unsigned SR 28 and SR 111 on the state line; US 127 continues north into Kentucky
1.000 mi = 1.609 km; 1.000 km = 0.621 mi: Concurrency terminus
