= U.S. Route 127 in Tennessee =

Highway in Tennessee, United States

U.S. Route 127
- US 127 highlighted in red

Route information
- Auxiliary route of US 27
- Maintained by TDOT
- Length: 129.5 mi (208.4 km)
- Tourist routes: Cumberland Historic Byway; Sequatchie Valley Scenic Byway

Major junctions
- South end: US 27 in Red Bank
- SR 27 in Signal Mountain; SR 28 in Dunlap; SR 8 / SR 111 in Dunlap; US 70 / SR 101 in Crossville; US 70N in Crossville; I-40 in Crossville; SR 62 in Clarkrange; SR 52 in Jamestown
- North end: US 127 at Static

Location
- Country: United States
- State: Tennessee
- Counties: Hamilton, Sequatchie, Bledsoe, Cumberland, Fentress, Pickett

Highway system
- United States Numbered Highway System; List; Special; Divided; Tennessee State Routes; Interstate; US; State
| ← SR 126 | → SR 127 |

U.S. Route 127 (US 127) in Tennessee is a 129.5-mile-long (208.4 km) United States Numbered Highway from Chattanooga to the Kentucky state line at Static. The highways connects through Dunlap, Pikeville, Crossville, and Jamestown. Throughout its length, US 127 straddles the line between East Tennessee and Middle Tennessee.

== Route description ==
=== Hamilton County ===
US 127 begins in Red Bank at an interchange between US 27 (SR 27/SR 29) and SR 8 (Dayton Boulevard), with US 127 heading northwest, along with SR 8 and SR 27 as its hidden, or secret, companions to pass through the northern portion of Chattanooga as a six-lane undivided highway known as Signal Mountain Road. The highway passes through industrial areas for a couple of miles, where SR 27 splits off along Suck Creek Road, before leaving the Chattanooga city limits and ascending onto the Cumberland Plateau as a two-lane highway. US 127/SR 8 passes through the towns of Signal Mountain, Walden, and Fairmount before entering Sequatchie County.

=== Sequatchie County ===
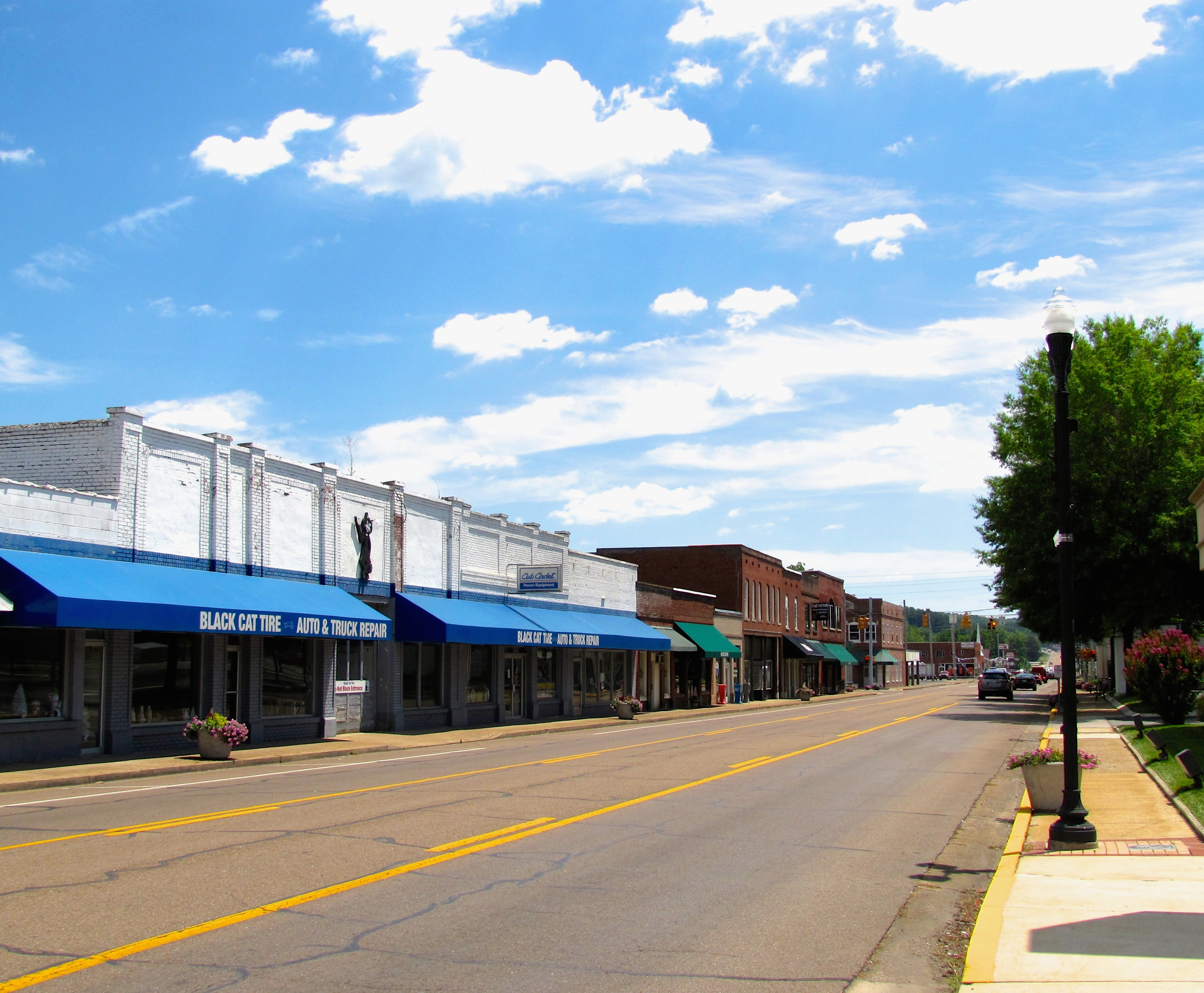
Businesses along Rankin Avenue (US 127/SR 8/SR 28) in downtown Dunlap, Tennessee

US 127/SR 8 passes through the Lone Oak community before descending into the Sequatchie Valley and passing through farmland. The highway passes through Center Point, where it meets SR 283 and crosses the Sequatchie River, to enter Dunlap and has a Y-intersection with SR 28, with that designation joining US 127 for its remainder in the state. US 127/SR 8/SR 28 passes northeast directly through downtown along Rankin Avenue to have an interchange with SR 111 after passing through some neighborhoods. Here SR 8 becomes signed and splits off along SR 111 north while US 127/SR 28 leaves Dunlap to head through rural farmland for the next several miles to cross into Bledsoe County.

From Dunlap northward, US 127 parallels the Sequatchie River.

=== Bledsoe County ===
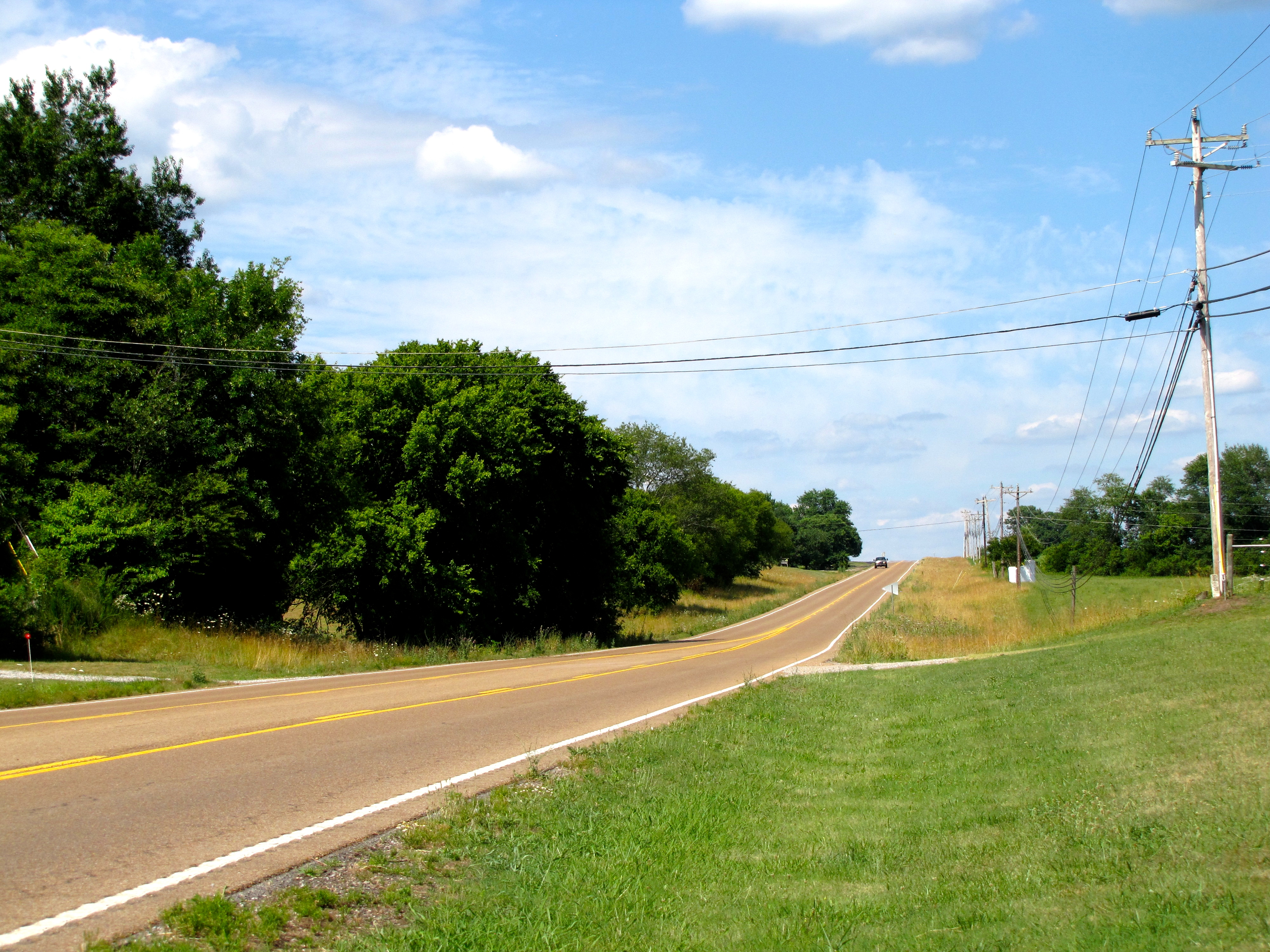
US 127 and SR 28 near Lees Station

The highway now passes through Palio, Lusk, and Lees Station before entering Pikeville at an intersection with SR 30. They then run concurrently to bypass downtown before splitting off to the west; US 127/SR 28 continues north through farmland to pass through Cold Spring and Melvine before pulling away from the Sequatchie River and ascending back onto the Cumberland Plateau and entering Cumberland County.

=== Cumberland County ===
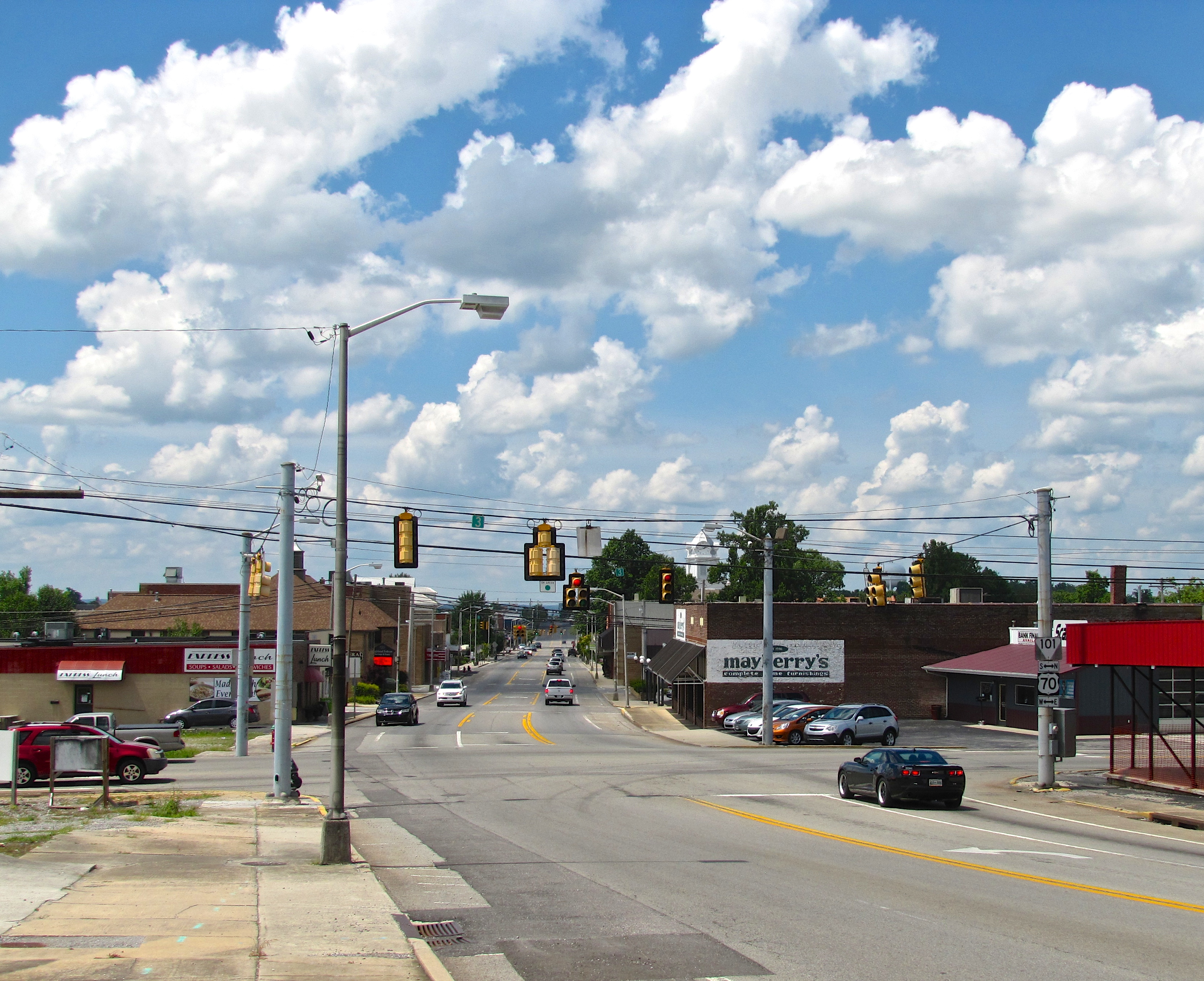
View along Main Street (US 127/SR 28) in Crossville, Tennessee, at its intersection with Lantana Road (US 70/SR 1/SR 101)

US 127/SR 28 immediately has an intersection with Vandever Road, which is a connector to SR 282 and Lake Tansi Village. The highways then goes through more farmland before passing by Cumberland Mountain State Park and an intersection with SR 419. The highway now passes through Cumberland Homesteads, where it has a Y-intersection with SR 68, and US 127/SR 28 turns northeast to enter Crossville. US 127/SR 28 intersects SR 392 (a beltway around downtown) before entering downtown and an intersection with US 70/SR 1/SR 101. It then passes through downtown before widening to four lanes and junctioning with SR 298. US 127/SR 28 then has an intersection with US 70N/SR 24 before going through Crossville's main business district and crossing the Obed River and coming to an interchange with I-40 (exit 317). US 127/SR 28 then leaves Crossville, narrowing to two lanes, and continuing north through more farmland. It then crosses into Fentress County via a couple of sharp switchbacks, in order to negotiate a bridge over Clear Creek.

=== Fentress County ===
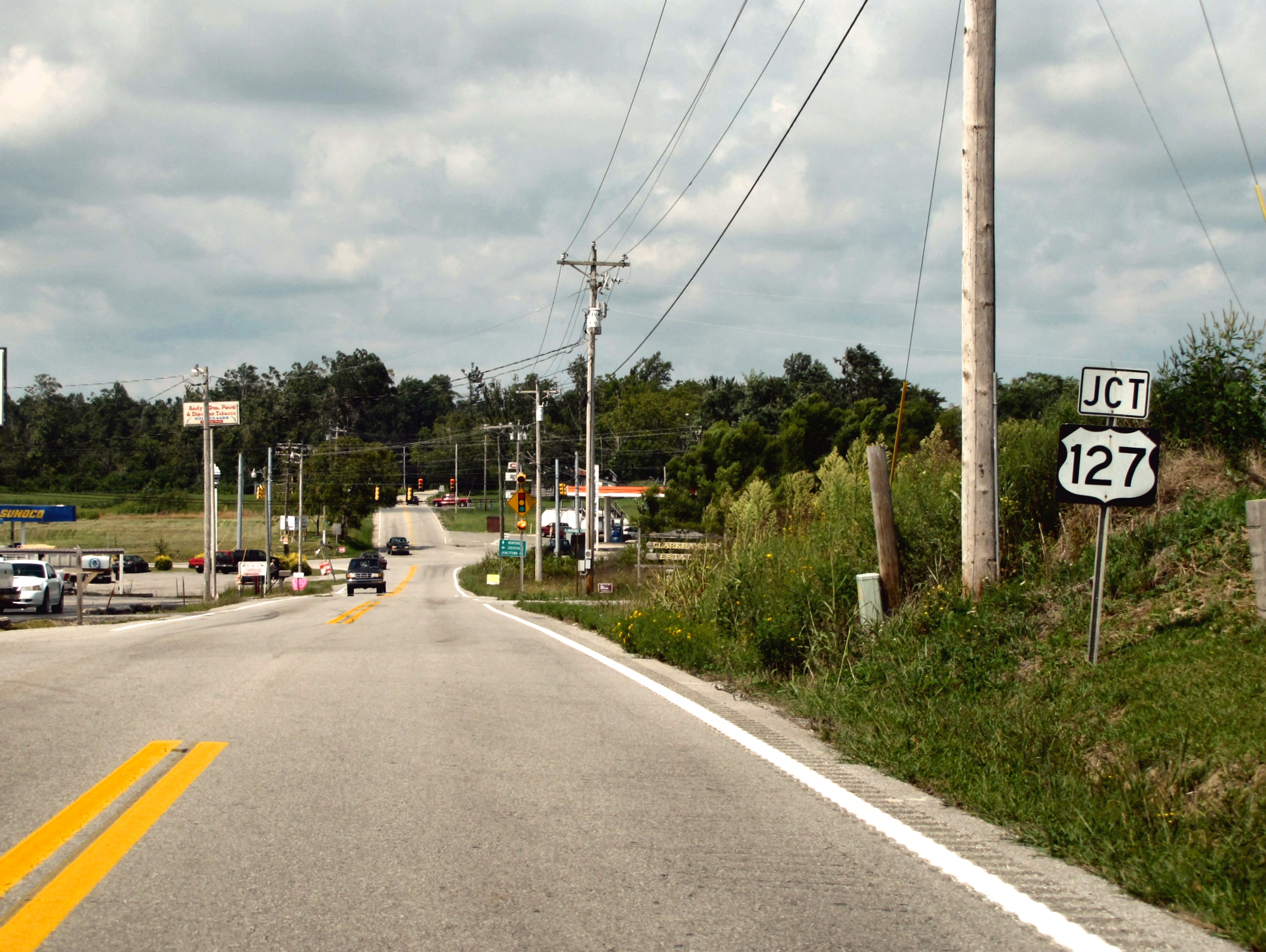
The intersection of US127 and SR 62 in Clarkrange

US 127/SR 28 then goes through more farmland before entering Clarkrange to an intersection with SR 62. US 127/SR 28 then passes through Clarkrange before an intersection with SR 85 and entering Grimsley. It then passes through Grimsley before widening to four lanes to pass by Jamestown Municipal Airport and intersect SR 296 west of Allardt. It then enters Jamestown and bypasses downtown, beginning with the intersection with Main Street (Old US 127/SR 28) to the east and an interchange with SR 52 before another with SR 154. The highway then leaves Jamestown, at the other end of Main Street (Old US 127/SR 28), and continues north and narrowing to two lanes, winding its way through rural and hilly terrain for several miles. It then passes through Sgt. Alvin C. York State Historic Park and Pall Mall, where the highway crosses the Wolf River, before passing through Forbus and having an intersection with Caney Creek Road (connector to Kentucky Route 200). The highway crosses into Pickett County shortly thereafter.

=== Pickett County ===
The highway winds it way through rural areas for several miles to intersect with SR 325, and then SR 295, before passing through Chanute and entering Static, intersecting both Kentucky Route 1076 and SR 111 immediately before crossing the state line into Kentucky; SR 28 ends there and US 127 continues into Kentucky towards the town of Albany.

== History ==
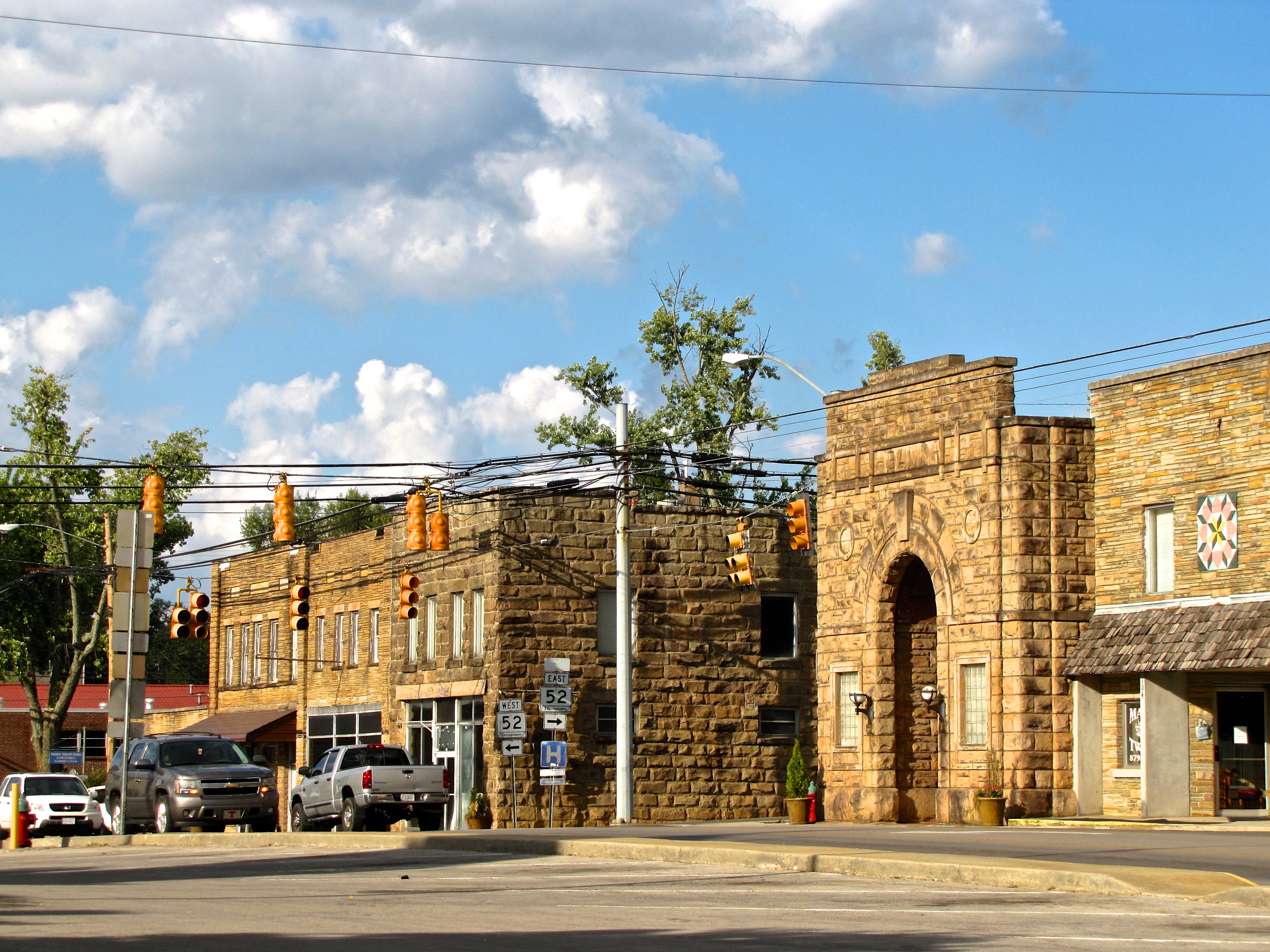
The former alignment of US 127 (Main Street) at SR 52 in downtown Jamestown

US 127's current alignment was signed solely as SR 28 until the US 127 corridor's southern terminus was relocated to Chattanooga when the US route was extended south from Cincinnati, Ohio. From 1958 until the 2010s, US 127’s southern terminus was originally located in downtown Chattanooga, where it intersected US 41 during that route’s concurrency with US 76.

In 1987, the entire alignment of US 127 in Tennessee and Kentucky became the main route for the first annual 127 Corridor Sale. The yard sale route has since extended into other areas along US 127 into Ohio, as well as varied state highways in southern Hamilton County, and into northwest Georgia and northeast Alabama. The tradition continues until this day, and this year's yard sale will be the 43rd annual one.

== Junction list ==
| County | Location | mi | km | Destinations | Notes |
|---|---|---|---|---|---|
| Hamilton | Red Bank | 0.0 | 0.0 | US 27 (SR 27 east/SR 29) / SR 8 south (Signal Mountain Road) – Chattanooga, Dayton | Southern terminus; interchange; southern end of unsigned SR 8/SR 27 concurrency |
| Hamilton | Signal Mountain | 1.5 | 2.4 | SR 27 west (Suck Creek Road) – Powells Crossroads | Northern end of unsigned SR 27 concurency |
| Sequatchie | Center Point | 21.9 | 35.2 | SR 283 south (E Valley Road) – Powells Crossroads | Northern terminus of SR 283 |
| Sequatchie | Dunlap | 23.0– 23.1 | 37.0– 37.2 | Bridge over the Sequatchie River | |
| Sequatchie | Dunlap | 25.0 | 40.2 | SR 28 south – Whitwell, Jasper | Southern end of unsigned SR 28 concurrency |
| Sequatchie | Dunlap | 27.7– 28.0 | 44.6– 45.1 | SR 8 north / SR 111 – Cookeville, Chattanooga | Interchange; northern end of unsigned SR 8 concurrency |
| Bledsoe | Pikeville | 44.7 | 71.9 | SR 30 east – Dayton | Southern end of SR 30 concurrency |
| Bledsoe | Pikeville | 44.8 | 72.1 | Main Street - Downtown | Old US 127/SR 28 through downtown |
| Bledsoe | Pikeville | 46.3 | 74.5 | Main Street - Downtown | Old US 127/SR 28/SR 30 through downtown |
| Bledsoe | Pikeville | 46.4 | 74.7 | SR 30 west – Spencer, Fall Creek Falls State Park | Northern end of SR 30 concurrency |
| Cumberland | | 62.5 | 100.6 | Vandever Road to SR 282 – Lake Tansi Village | Connector to SR 282 and Lake Tansi Village |
| Cumberland | Cumberland Homesteads | 68.9– 69.0 | 110.9– 111.0 | SR 419 north (Pigeon Ridge Road) – Cumberland Mountain State Park | Southern terminus of SR 419 |
| Cumberland | Cumberland Homesteads | 69.5– 69.6 | 111.8– 112.0 | SR 68 south – Spring City | Northern terminus of SR 68 |
| Cumberland | Crossville | 72.1 | 116.0 | SR 392 (Miller Avenue) | Beltway around downtown Crossville |
| Cumberland | Crossville | 73.1 | 117.6 | US 70 / SR 101 (Lantana Road/SR 1) – Sparta, Lake Tansi Village, Fairfield Glade, Crab Orchard | |
| Cumberland | Crossville | 73.8 | 118.8 | SR 298 north (Genesis Road) to I-40 | Southern terminus of SR 298 |
| Cumberland | Crossville | 74.1 | 119.3 | SR 392 south (Miller Avenue) | Northern terminus of SR 392; beltway around downtown Crossville |
| Cumberland | Crossville | 74.4 | 119.7 | US 70N west (Elmore Road/SR 24 west) – Monterey | Eastern terminus of US 70N and unsigned SR 24 |
| Cumberland | Crossville | 75.3 | 121.2 | Bridge over the Little Obed River | |
| Cumberland | Crossville | 76.0 | 122.3 | SR 462 south (Northside Drive/Interstate Drive) | Northwest Connector; roadway exists but state designation does not yet |
| Cumberland | Crossville | 76.8– 76.9 | 123.6– 123.8 | Seward C. Bishop Memorial Bridge over the Obed River | |
| Cumberland | Crossville | 77.0– 77.1 | 123.9– 124.1 | I-40 – Knoxville, Nashville | I-40 Exit 317 |
| Cumberland–Fentress county line | | 89.6– 89.7 | 144.2– 144.4 | D.O. Beaty Bridge over Clear Creek | |
| Fentress | Clarkrange | 90.8 | 146.1 | SR 62 (Clarkrange Highway/Deer Lodge Highway) – Monterey, Wartburg | |
| Fentress | Grimsley | 95.1 | 153.0 | SR 85 west (Wilder Road) – Livingston | Eastern terminus of SR 85 |
| Fentress | | 103.3 | 166.2 | Airport Road - Jamestown Municipal Airport | |
| Fentress | | 105.8 | 170.3 | SR 296 east (Taylor Place Road) – Allardt | Western terminus of SR 296 |
| Fentress | Jamestown | 106.2 | 170.9 | Old US 127 (South Main Street) | |
| Fentress | Jamestown | 108.6– 108.7 | 174.8– 174.9 | SR 52 (East Central Avenue/Allardt Highway) – Jamestown, Allardt, Rugby | Interchange |
| Fentress | Jamestown | 110.6– 110.7 | 178.0– 178.2 | SR 154 (Pickett Parks Highway) – Jamestown, Pickett State Park, Big South Fork National River and Recreation Area, Monticello, KY | Interchange |
| Fentress | Jamestown | 111.9 | 180.1 | Old US 127 (North York Highway, North Main Street) | |
| Fentress | Pall Mall / Sgt. Alvin C. York State Historic Park | 118.4 | 190.5 | WW1 Centennial Bridge over the Wolf River | |
| Fentress | Forbus | 122.3 | 196.8 | Caney Creek Road to KY 200 – Monticello | Caney Creek Road becomes KY 200 at the state line |
| Pickett | | 123.4 | 198.6 | SR 325 west (Red Hill Road) – Byrdstown | Eastern terminus of SR 325 |
| Pickett | | 125.8 | 202.5 | SR 295 west (Parker Road) – Byrdstown | Eastern terminus of SR 295 |
| Pickett | Static | 129.4 | 208.2 | KY 1076 north | Intersection right on the state line; southern terminus of KY 1076 |
| Pickett | Static | 129.5 | 208.4 | SR 111 south – Livingston, Byrdstown US 127 north – Albany, Jamestown | Northern terminus of SR 111 on the state line; US 127 continues north into Kentucky; northern terminus of unsigned SR 28 |
1.000 mi = 1.609 km; 1.000 km = 0.621 mi: Concurrency terminus; Unopened

== See also ==
U.S. Route 127
| Previous state: Terminus | Tennessee | Next state: Kentucky |
