= Tennessee State Route 101 =

State highway in Tennessee, United States

State Route 101
- SR 101 highlighted in red

Route information
- Maintained by TDOT
- Length: 38.7 mi (62.3 km)

Major junctions
- South end: SR 30 in Mount Crest
- US 127 in Crossville; US 70 / SR 392 in Crossville; I-40 in Crossville
- North end: Stonehenge Drive, Eagle Drive and Peavine Road in Fairfield Glade

Location
- Country: United States
- State: Tennessee
- Counties: Bledsoe, Cumberland

Highway system
- Tennessee State Routes; Interstate; US; State
← SR 100	→ SR 102

State Route 101 (SR 101) is a state highway in Bledsoe and Cumberland counties in the eastern portion U.S. state of Tennessee.

== Route description ==
SR 101 begins in the rolling farmlands of Bledsoe County at a Y-Intersection with SR 30 in the Mount Crest community. It then goes northwest as it enters a large wooded area before coming to an intersection with SR 285, where it turns northeast and crosses into Cumberland County. It then becomes curvy as it passes through the rolling hills and farmland of the Cumberland Plateau before passing just north of Lake Tansi Village and having an intersection with SR 282, northeast of Meadow Park Lake. It then has an intersection with SR 419, which provides access to Cumberland Mountain State Park. It then enters Crossville, at an intersection with SR 392 (a beltway around downtown). It then enters downtown and comes to an intersection and becomes concurrent with US 70/SR 1. They then intersect US 127/SR 28 a short distance later. They then leave downtown and come to another intersection with SR 392, where SR 101 separates from US 70/SR 1 and goes north to have an interchange with I-40 (Exit 322) before leaving Crossville and continuing northeast. It then enters the Fairfield Glade Resort, where it ends and continues as Peavine Road.

== History ==
SR 101 was originally numbered in a different place before 1983, where it was renumbered parts as of SR 285 and SR 301.

== Junction list ==
County	Location	mi	km	Destinations	Notes
Bledsoe	Mount Crest	0.00	0.00	SR 30 – Pikeville, Spencer	Southern terminus
Bledsoe				SR 285 west to SR 301 – Spencer	Eastern terminus of SR 285
Cumberland				SR 282 south (Dunbar Road) – Lake Tansi Village	Northern terminus of SR 282
Cumberland				SR 419 south (Pigeon Ridge Road) – Cumberland Mountain State Park	Northern terminus of SR 419
Cumberland	Crossville			SR 392 south (Miller Avenue) – Fairfield Glade	Southern end of SR 392 concurrency
Cumberland	Crossville			SR 392 north (Miller Avenue)	Northern end of SR 392 concurrency
Cumberland	Crossville			US 70 west (West Avenue/SR 1 west)	Southern end of US 70/SR 1 concurrency
Cumberland	Crossville			US 127 (South Main Street/SR 28) – Pikeville, Clarkrange	
Cumberland	Crossville			US 70 east (Highway 70/SR 1 east) / SR 392 north (Miller Avenue) – Rockwood, Crossville	Northern end of US 70/SR 1 concurrency; Southern terminus of SR 392
Cumberland	Crossville			I-40 – Knoxville, Nashville	I-40 exit 322
Cumberland	Fairfield Glade			Stonehenge Drive, Eagle Lane and Peavine Road	Northern terminus
1.000 mi = 1.609 km; 1.000 km = 0.621 mi: Concurrency terminus
