= Tennessee State Route 392 =

State highway in Tennessee, United States

State Route 392
- Miller Avenue
- TN 392 highlighted in red

Route information
- Maintained by TDOT
- Length: 5.3 mi (8.5 km)

Major junctions
- Beltway around Downtown Crossville
- South end: US 127
- US 70; US 127
- North end: US 70 / SR 101

Location
- Country: United States
- State: Tennessee
- Counties: Cumberland

Highway system
- Tennessee State Routes; Interstate; US; State
← SR 391	→ SR 394

State Route 392 (SR 392) is a state highway and bypass around downtown Crossville in Cumberland County in the U.S. state of Tennessee.

== Route description ==
SR 392 begins on the northwestern edge of downtown Crossville at an intersection with US 127/SR 28 (N Main Street). It proceeds southwest as an undivided 2-lane highway with a center turn lane to an intersection with US 70/SR 1 (West Avenue), where it widens to a 4-lane undivided highway and turns southeast. The highway passes by several homes and businesses before narrowing to 2 lanes after its short concurrency with SR 101 (Lantana Road). SR 392 continues southeast through some neighborhoods to another intersection with US 127/SR 28 (S Main Street). The highway then gains a center turn lane and curves northeast, passing through some more rural areas before coming to an end at an intersection with US 70/SR 1/SR 101 (Highway 70/Peavine Road) at a roundabout, just south of SR 101's interchange with I-40 (Exit 322).

The entire route of SR 392 is known as Miller Avenue.

== Junction list ==
The entire route is in Crossville, Cumberland County.

mi	km	Destinations	Notes
0.00	0.00	US 127 (North Main Street/SR 28) – Jamestown, Pikeville	Southern terminus
0.04	0.064	US 70 (West Avenue/SR 1) to US 70N – Sparta, Monterey	
1.6	2.6	SR 101 north (Lantana Road) – Fairfield Glade	Southern end of wrong-way SR 101 concurrency
1.7	2.7	SR 101 south (Lantana Road) – Lake Tansi Village	Northern end of wrong-way SR 101 concurrency
2.8	4.5	US 127 (South Main Street/SR 28) – Pikeville, Crossville	
5.3	8.5	US 70 (Highway 70/SR 1) / SR 101 (Peavine Road) to I-40 – Fairfield Glade, Crab Orchard, Crossville	SR 101 goes to I-40; Northern terminus
1.000 mi = 1.609 km; 1.000 km = 0.621 mi: Concurrency terminus
