= Tansi =

Tansi is a surname. Notable people with the surname include:

- Cyprian Michael Iwene Tansi (1903–1964), Nigerian Roman Catholic priest who died in England
- Sony Lab'ou Tansi (1947–1995), Congolese novelist, short-story writer, playwright, and poet

== See also ==
- Lake Tansi Village, Tennessee
