= Tennessee State Route 419 =

State highway in Tennessee, United States

State Route 419
- Pigeon Ridge Road
- TN 419 highlighted in red

Route information
- Maintained by TDOT
- Length: 4.0 mi (6.4 km)

Major junctions
- South end: US 127 in Cumberland Homesteads
- North end: SR 101 just south of Crossville

Location
- Country: United States
- State: Tennessee
- Counties: Cumberland

Highway system
- Tennessee State Routes; Interstate; US; State
← SR 418	→ SR 420

State Route 419 (SR 419), also known as Pigeon Ridge Road, is a 4.0-mile-long (6.4 km) north–south state highway in Cumberland County, Tennessee. It serves as the primary road in and out of Cumberland Mountain State Park. Even though it is signed north–south, SR 419 primarily goes in an east–west direction.

== Route description ==
SR 419 begins in the Cumberland Homesteads community at an intersection with US 127/SR 28. It immediately enters Cumberland Mountain State Park and winds its way west through the park, crossing atop the Byrd Creek Dam along the way. The highway then leaves the park and winds its way west through farmland and rural areas to come to an end just south of Crossville at an intersection with SR 101. The entire route of SR 419 is a two-lane highway and lies atop the Cumberland Plateau.

== Major intersections ==
The entire route is in Cumberland County.

Location	mi	km	Destinations	Notes
Cumberland Homesteads	0.0	0.0	US 127 (SR 28) – Crossville, Pikeville	Southern terminus
Cumberland Mountain State Park			Crossing of Byrd Creek Dam	
	4.0	6.4	SR 101 (Lantana Road) – Lake Tansi Village, Crossville	Northern terminus
1.000 mi = 1.609 km; 1.000 km = 0.621 mi
