= Tennessee State Route 282 =

Secondary state highway in Tennessee, US

State Route 282
- Dunbar Road
- SR 282 highlighted in red

Route information
- Maintained by TDOT
- Length: 3.7 mi (6.0 km)
- Existed: July 1, 1983–present

Major junctions
- South end: Dunbar Road 0.1 mile south of Beaver Road in Lake Tansi Village
- North end: SR 101 near Crossville

Location
- Country: United States
- State: Tennessee
- Counties: Cumberland

Highway system
- Tennessee State Routes; Interstate; US; State
← SR 281	→ SR 283

State Route 282 (SR 282), also known as Dunbar Road, is a 3.7-mile-long (6.0 km) secondary state highway in Cumberland County, Tennessee, connecting SR 101 with Lake Tansi Village. SR 282 is the primary road, and only state highway, in and out of Lake Tansi Village.

== Route description ==
SR 282 begins in Lake Tansi Village as a continuation of Dunbar Road, directly beside of Brown Elementary School 0.1 mile south of an intersection with Beaver Road. It goes north to pass through neighborhoods before passing by, and crossing, Lake Tansi. The highway then passes several businesses and a golf course before passing through more neighborhoods. SR 282 then leaves Lake Tansi Village and goes northeast through rural areas before coming to an end at an intersection with SR 101, just southwest of Crossville. SR 282 is a two-lane road for its entire length.

== Major intersections ==
The entire route is in Cumberland County.

Location	mi	km	Destinations	Notes
Lake Tansi Village	0.0	0.0	Dunbar Road to US 127	Southern terminus; continuation south
Lake Tansi Village	0.6	0.97	Bridge over Lake Tansi	
	3.7	6.0	SR 101 (Lantana Road) – Mount Crest, Crossville	Northern terminus
1.000 mi = 1.609 km; 1.000 km = 0.621 mi
