= Cumberland Homesteads =

- Cumberland Homesteads Historic District
- U.S. National Register of Historic Places
- U.S. Historic district
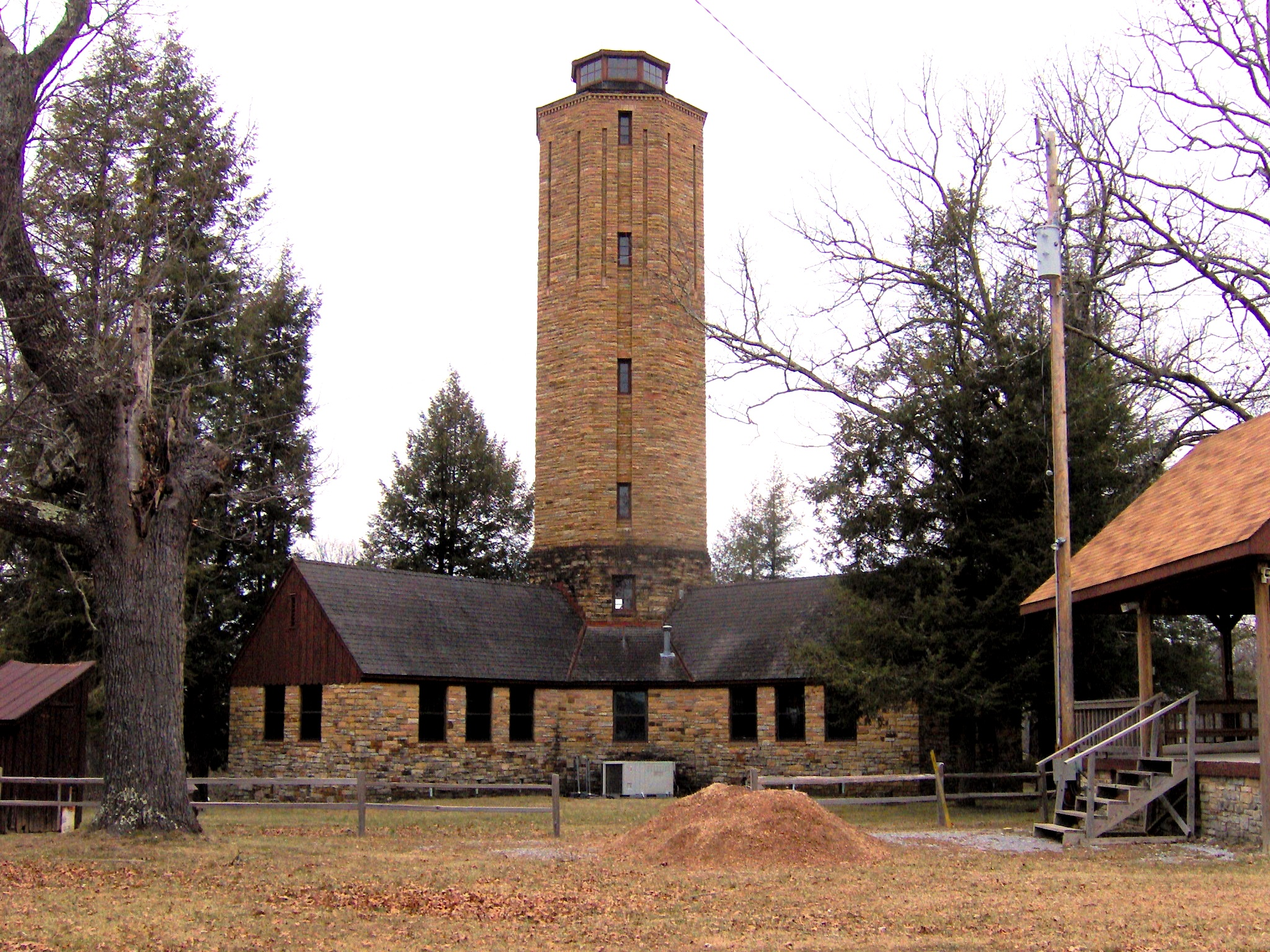
- Homesteads Tower

- Location within Tennessee Location within the United States
- Location: Roughly along County Seat and Valley Rds., Grassy Cove Rd., Deep Draw and Pigeon Ridge Rds.
- Nearest city: Crossville, Tennessee
- Coordinates: 35°54′22″N 84°58′58″W
- Area: 10,250 acres (4,150 ha)
- Built: 1934–1941
- Architect: William Macy Stanton
- Architectural style: FSA small house
- NRHP reference No.: 88001593
- Added to NRHP: September 30, 1988

Cumberland Homesteads is a community located in Cumberland County, Tennessee, United States. Established by the New Deal-era Division of Subsistence Homesteads in 1934, the community was envisioned by federal planners as a model of cooperative living for the region's distressed farmers, coal miners, and factory workers. While the cooperative experiment failed and the federal government withdrew from the project in the 1940s, the Homesteads community nevertheless survived. In 1988, several hundred of the community's original houses and other buildings, which are characterized by the native "crab orchard" sandstone used in their construction, were added to the National Register of Historic Places as a historic district.

By the early 1930s, decades of poor farming practices had rendered many of the small farms in East Tennessee untenable, and the Great Depression had left thousands of coal miners and other industrial workers unemployed. In January 1934, the Division of Subsistence Homesteads chose Cumberland County as a site for one of its "stranded" agricultural communities, in which families were resettled on small farms and would work in community-owned businesses. Most of the cooperative ventures failed, however, and after World War II the government divested itself of the project. The community's general layout still appears much as it did in the late 1930s.

== Location ==
Cumberland Homesteads is located in a hilly area atop the Cumberland Plateau, just south of Crossville. Byrd Creek, a tributary of the Obed River, flows through and drains much of the community. Cumberland Mountain State Park, which was developed simultaneously in the 1930s as a recreational area, is located in Cumberland Homesteads.

U.S. Route 127 connects the Homestead area with Crossville and Interstate 40 to the north and the Sequatchie Valley to the south. State Route 68 (Grassy Cove Road) connects the area to Grassy Cove and Spring City to the east. The Cumberland Homesteads Historic District, which covers over 10,000 acres (40 km^{2}), includes properties on Chestnut Lane, Coon Hollow Lane, County Seat Road, Crab Apple Lane, Crab Orchard Road, Deep Draw Road, Grassy Cove Road (State Route 68), Highland Lane, Huckleberry Road, Old Mail Road, Open Range Road, Pigeon Ridge Road (State Route 419), Saw Mill Road, Turkey Oak Road, and Valley Road, as well as over a dozen structures in Cumberland Mountain State Park.

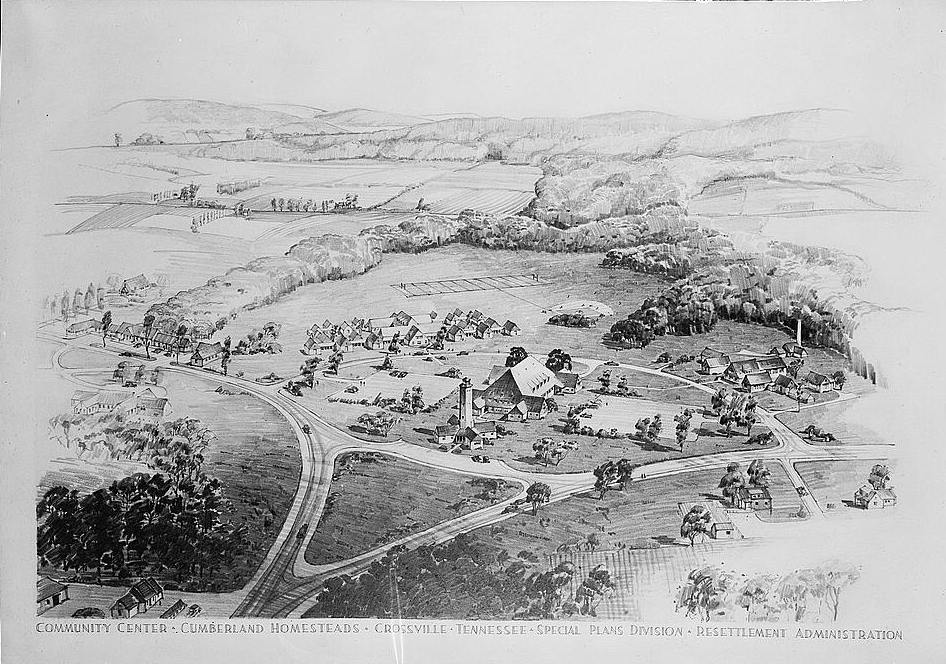
Site plan for Cumberland Homesteads

== Conception ==
The passage of the National Industrial Recovery Act in 1933 created the Division of Subsistence Homesteads and gave the Roosevelt Administration $25,000,000 to purchase land for the creation of small farming communities for the nation's displaced workers. Cumberland County farm agent Robert Lyons led a local committee that drew up a proposal for a homestead community, which it submitted to the Division of Subsistence Homesteads in December 1933. Lyons had likely been influenced by earlier Plateau-area "back to the land" experiments, such as the Clifty Consolidated Coal Company's 1917 program that helped Fentress County miners purchase small farms, as well as relief efforts provided by local Quakers. Due in part to the influence of Tennessee Valley Authority chairman and cooperative living proponent Arthur Morgan, the Division of Subsistence Homesteads accepted the Cumberland County proposal in January 1934. The Civil Works Administration immediately hired several hundred locals to prepare the newly acquired land, providing wages that effectively ended the Great Depression in Cumberland County. Tennessee Valley Authority (TVA) architect William Macy Stanton, who designed a number of buildings in TVA's planned city of Norris, drew up basic designs for houses and other buildings at the Homesteads. The Civilian Conservation Corps built recreational buildings and a small lake for the community at what is now Cumberland Mountain State Park. By late 1934, the community's first stone houses had been completed.

== Intention and Applicants ==
Overall, Franklin D. Roosevelt came up with the project with grandiose expectations. FDR not only wanted the homes to be comfortable for the tenants, but the community to be utopian like. The Division focused on three types of settlements— communities of part-time farmers near wage-earning employment, communities of farmers resettled from unproductive land, and communities of "stranded" industrial workers, namely miners and loggers. The latter type, which eventually included Cumberland Homesteads, drew the most criticism, as many believed such communities would never be self-supporting. Kelly Cox, Director of the Cumberland Homestead Tower Association believes the project was successful because of the dire situation. According to her, the people were desperate for opportunity to work and create a living for themselves.

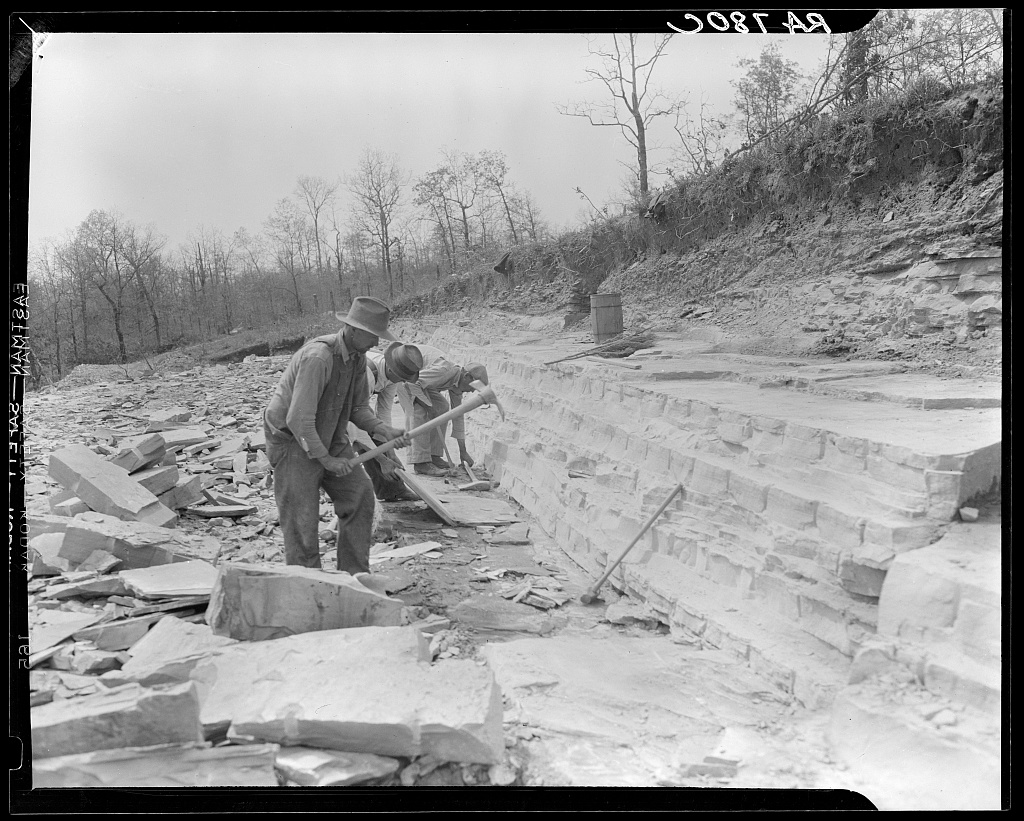
Crab orchard stone being quarried for Cumberland Homesteads construction

Over 20,000 acres (81 km^{2}) of land south of Crossville were purchased from the Missouri Land Company, and Cumberland Homesteads, Inc., was created to administer the project.

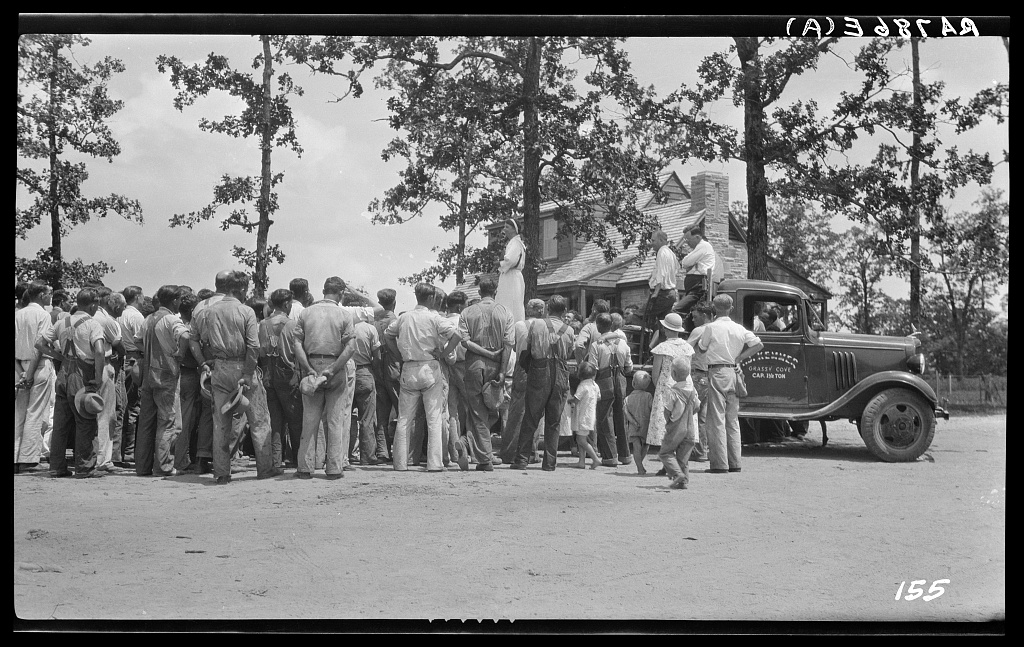
First Lady Eleanor Roosevelt speaking at Cumberland Homesteads in 1935

Of the initial 233 families selected for the Cumberland Homesteads project, 30% were distressed farmers, 30% were unemployed miners, 30% were unemployed textile workers, and 10% were struggling professionals (including teachers, nurses, and a doctor).

== Success of Project ==
A community-owned store (the "Trading Post") and cannery were established in 1934, but both struggled with inexperienced management. Wage-paying industries never relocated to the Homesteads as the government had hoped, and attempts by homesteaders to establish a coal mine and sorghum mill failed. Throughout the 1930s, the Homesteads project was overseen by a succession of agencies with differing philosophies, leaving the project without a clear purpose. By 1945, the federal government had extricated itself from the Homesteads project after allowing the remaining homesteaders to purchase their farms. Although the original purpose of the Homesteads project failed, the community survived, and over half the farms remained in the hands of original homesteaders through the 1950s.

== Interviews with Local Historians ==
Today the Cumberland Homestead Tower Association works hard to preserve the rich history of the Cumberland Homestead project. Three individuals who work in the Tower Association were interviewed and were clear in the opportunity that the project provided. Charles Tollett, an Association volunteer, was adamant that the Homesteads were not another Government handout, but an opportunity for Tennessee citizens to work hard for a place to live. From the beginning when the land was cleared and homes were built, the community held a pivotal role. Kelly Cox the Museum Director shared that some eventual tenants were working while two thirds of their credit hours would go towards purchasing a home.

== Building designs ==
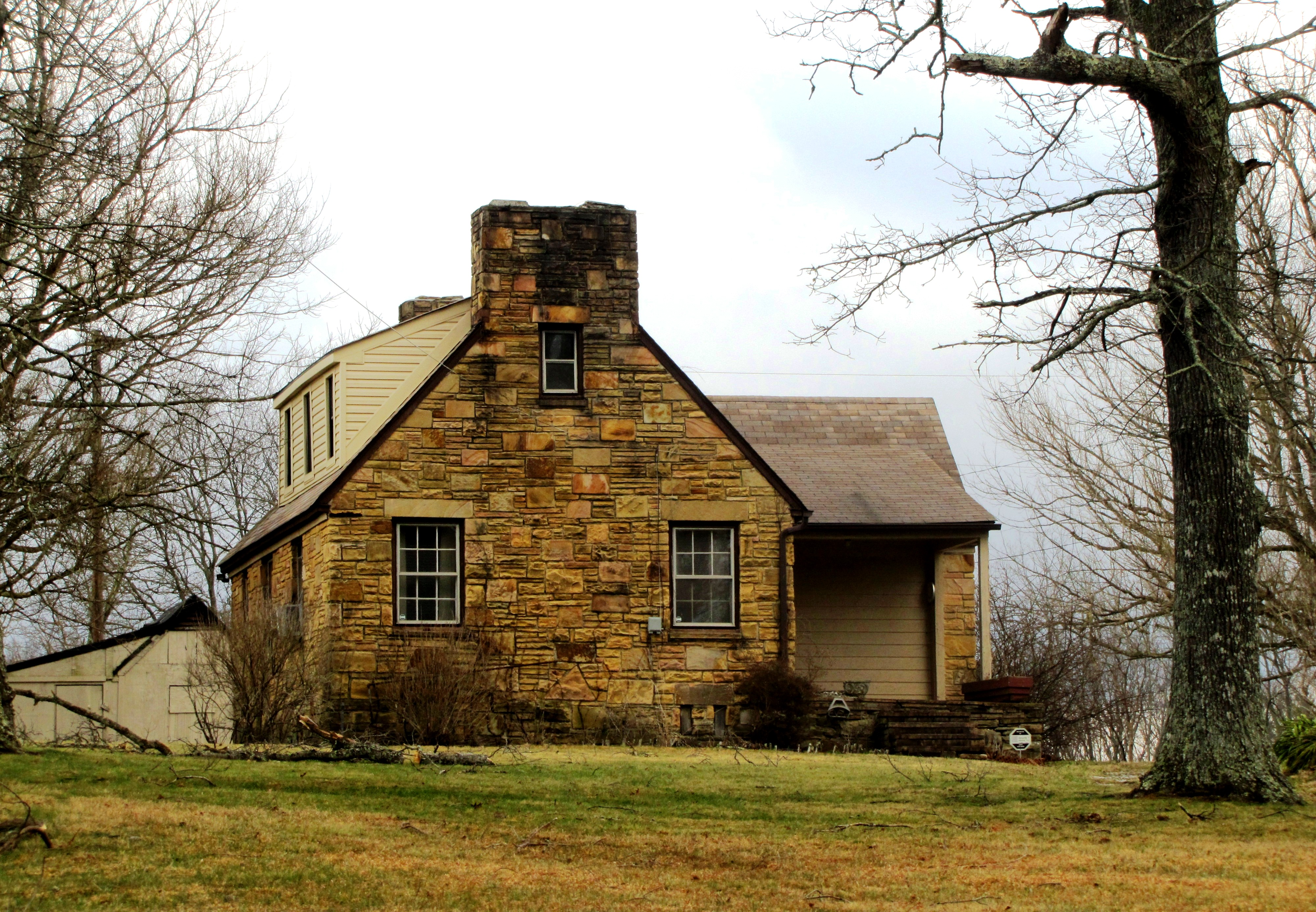
A typical Cumberland Homesteads house

When establishing the community, its creators were clear in their intention to build with resources local to the area according to Tollett. Buildings at Cumberland Homesteads were constructed using primarily a locally quarried sandstone known as "crab orchard" stone, which is known for its durability and reddish hue in late afternoon sunlight. The most notable building in Cumberland Homesteads is the Homesteads Tower, a cross-shaped building centered around an eight-story octagonal water tower. This building originally housed the Homesteads offices and provided water to the community. Today it is home to the Cumberland Homestead Tower Association which preserves the history of the program. The elementary school and high school, located behind the Homesteads Tower, consists of unique pod-style designs, with detached classrooms and workshops connected by covered walkways. Both school complexes are now part of Homestead Elementary School. The cannery and hosiery mill have both been modified to the extent that they are not considered contributing properties to the historic district, although their respective water towers are considered contributing structures.

== Homestead Today ==
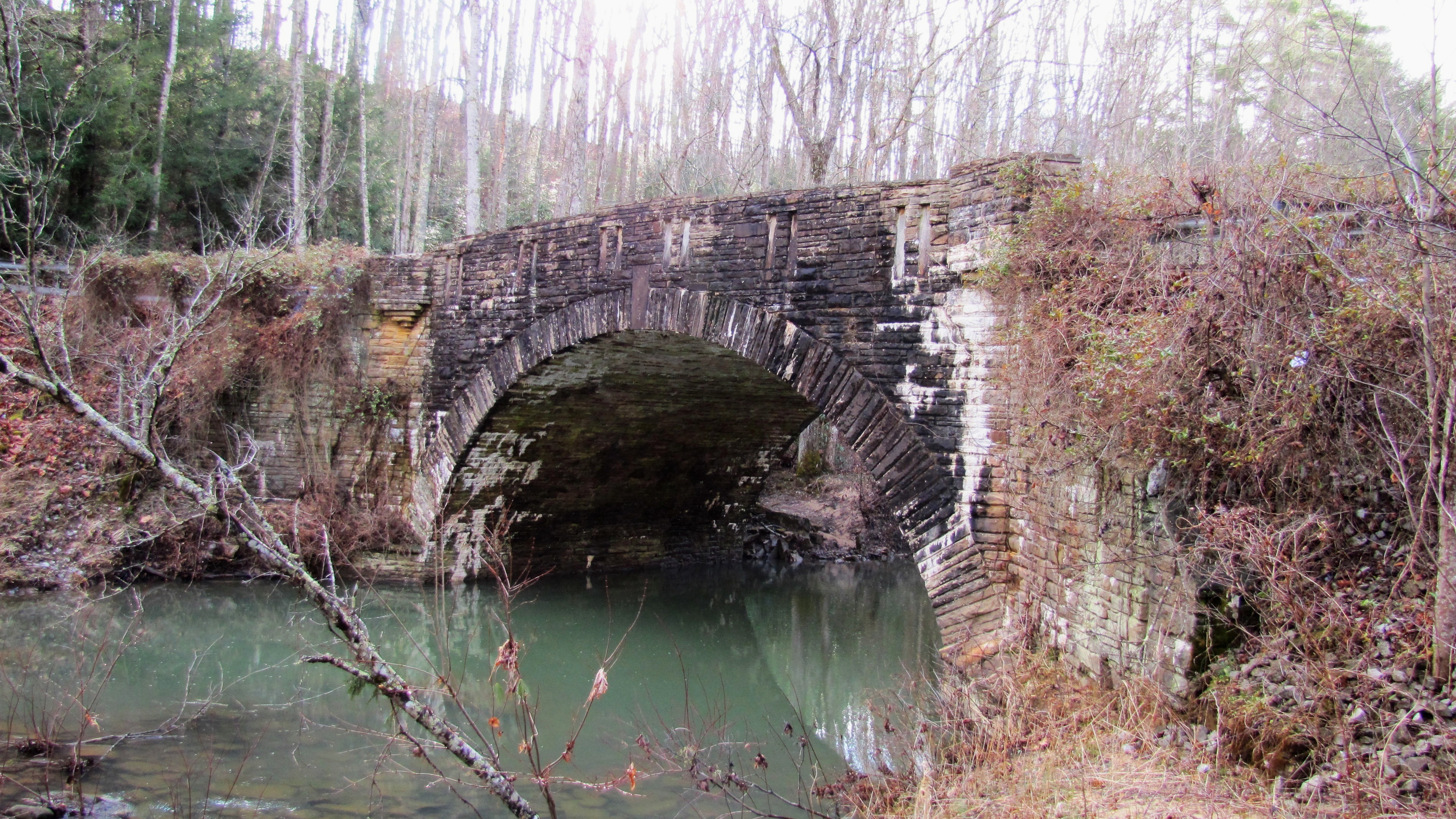
Stone arch bridge over Byrd Creek

Most of the original 251 houses are still standing. Fifteen distinct housing designs have been identified, with eleven of the designs found multiple times, as they followed basic patterns provided by William Macy Stanton. Stanton's designs include rectangular houses, L-shaped houses, and T-shaped houses, most of which are 1.5 stories with gable roofs and one or two chimneys. Most houses originally had covered-porch entrances and batten doors. Typical interiors consisted of pine paneling with built-in bookcases. Attics contained water storage tanks, and most houses were wired in anticipation of TVA providing electrical power. Most farmsteads included a barn (with either gable or gambrel-roof design), a smokehouse, a chicken house, and toolsheds.

The Cumberland Homesteads Historic District includes several structures at Cumberland Mountain State Park, including Byrd Creek Dam, Millhouse Lodge (originally a gristmill designed by Quakers), several rustic cabins, and a stone water tower. Byrd Creek Dam is the largest masonry structure ever built by the Civilian Conservation Corps. Two stone arch bridges, one along Deep Draw Road and one along Old Mail Road, are listed as contributing structures within the district.
