= Cold Spring, Tennessee =

Cold Spring
- Unincorporated community
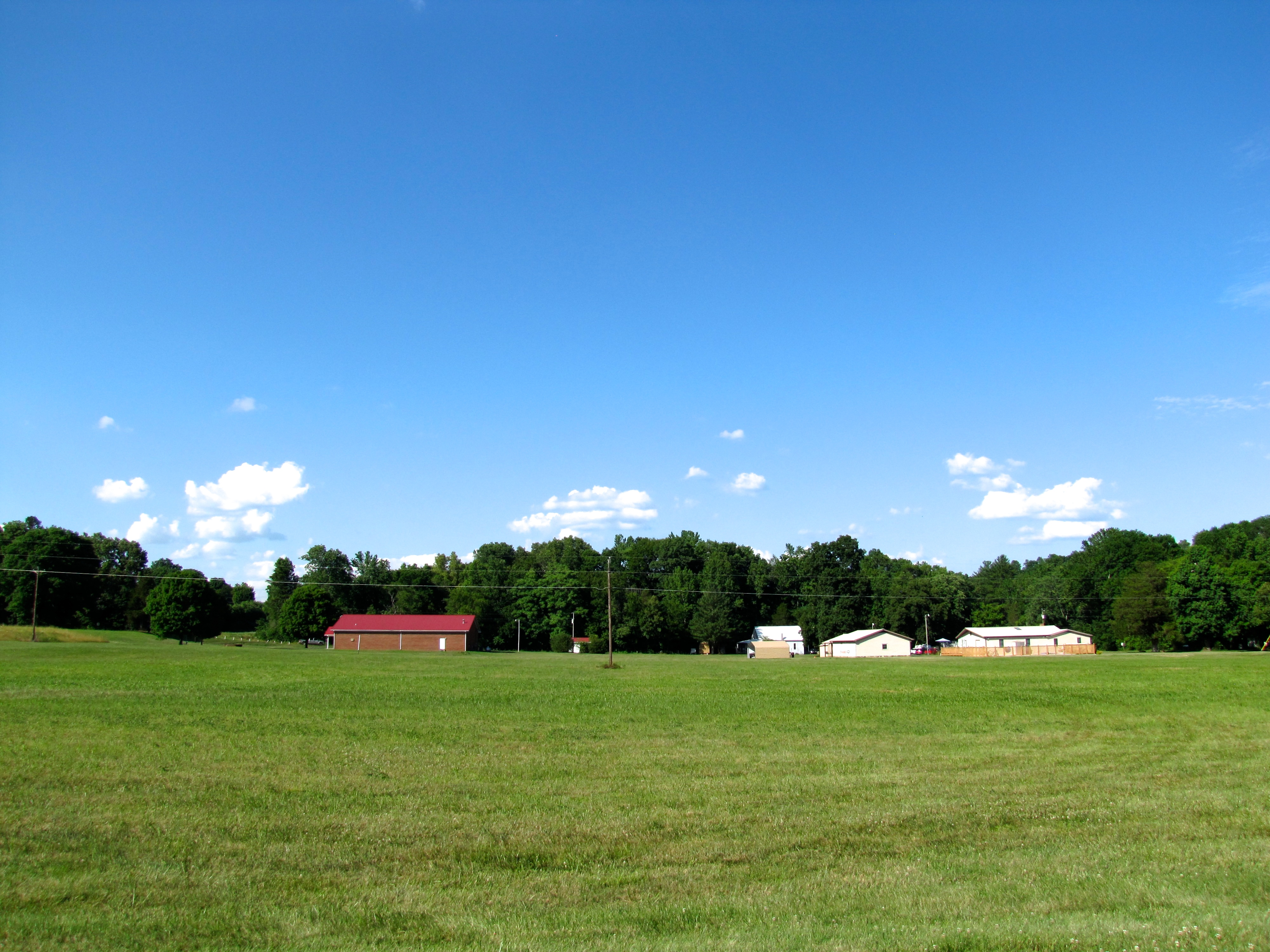

- Location within the state of Tennessee Cold Spring (the United States)
- Coordinates: 35°39′37″N 85°8′45″W
- Country: United States
- State: Tennessee
- County: Bledsoe
- Elevation: 876 ft (267 m)
- Time zone: UTC-6 (Central (CST))
  - Summer (DST): UTC-5 (CDT)
- GNIS feature ID: 1293581

Cold Spring (sometimes spelled Cold Springs) is an unincorporated community in Bledsoe County, Tennessee. It lies along U.S. Route 127 northeast of the city of Pikeville, the county seat of Bledsoe County. Its elevation is 876 feet (267 m).
