= Lusk, Tennessee =

Lusk Atpontley
- Unincorporated community
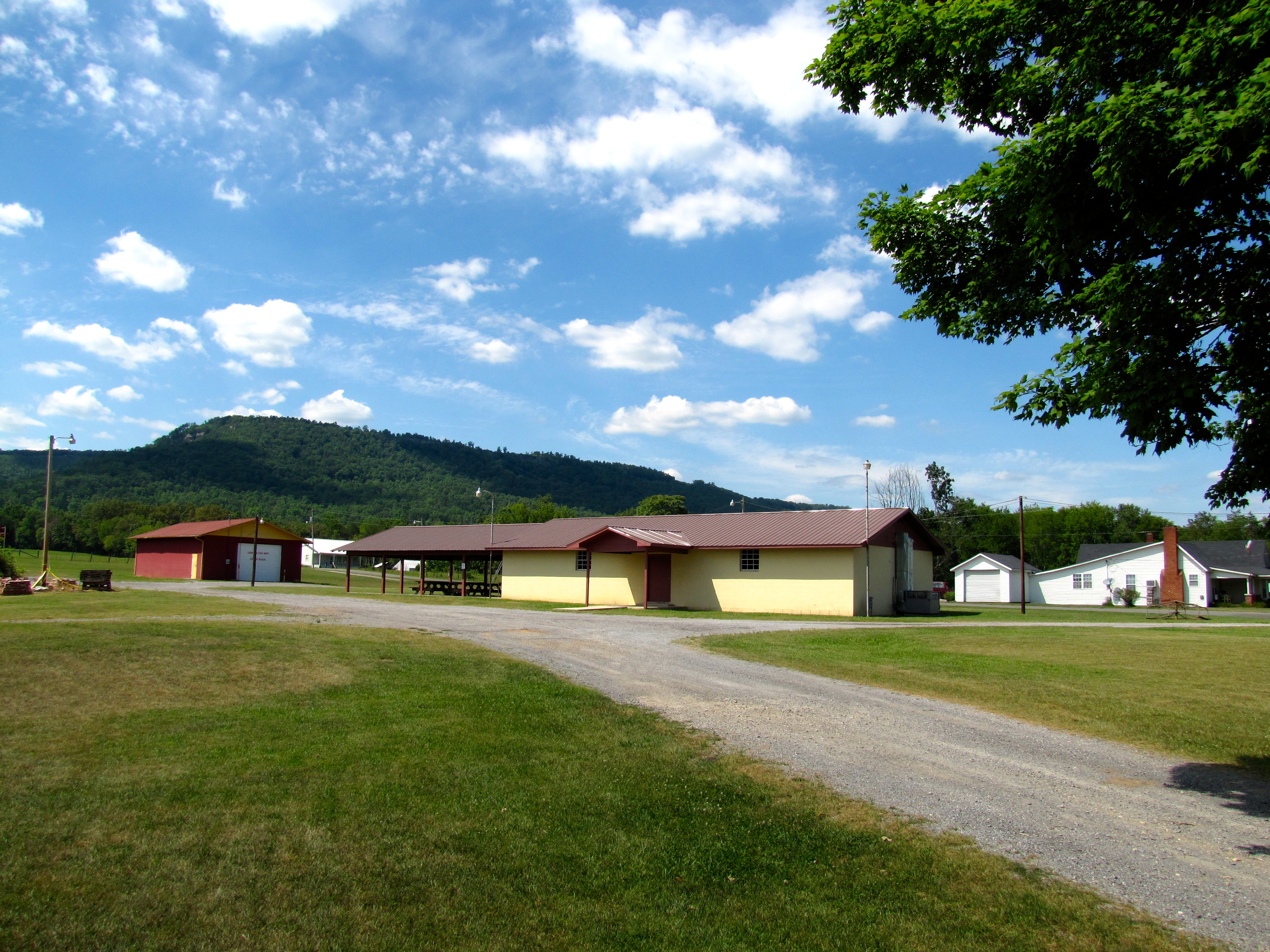
- Lusk Community Center

- Location within the state of Tennessee Lusk (the United States)
- Coordinates: 35°30′5″N 85°17′55″W
- Country: United States
- State: Tennessee
- County: Bledsoe
- Elevation: 797 ft (243 m)
- Time zone: UTC-6 (Central (CST))
  - Summer (DST): UTC-5 (CDT)
- GNIS feature ID: 1647452

Lusk (also Atpontley) is an unincorporated community in Bledsoe County, Tennessee. It lies along U.S. Route 127 southwest of the city of Pikeville, the county seat of Bledsoe County.

The variant name Atpontley is a compound of the names of three coal miners: Atkinson, Dupont, and Finley.
