= Melvine, Tennessee =

Melvine
- Unincorporated community
- Location within the state of Tennessee Melvine (the United States)
- Coordinates: 35°43′58″N 85°3′29″W
- Country: United States
- State: Tennessee
- County: Bledsoe
- Elevation: 965 ft (294 m)
- Time zone: UTC-6 (Central (CST))
  - Summer (DST): UTC-5 (CDT)
- GNIS feature ID: 1293581

Melvine is an unincorporated community in Bledsoe County, Tennessee. It lies near U.S. Route 127 northeast of the city of Pikeville, the county seat of Bledsoe County.
