= Cumberland Mountain State Park =

State park in Tennessee, United States

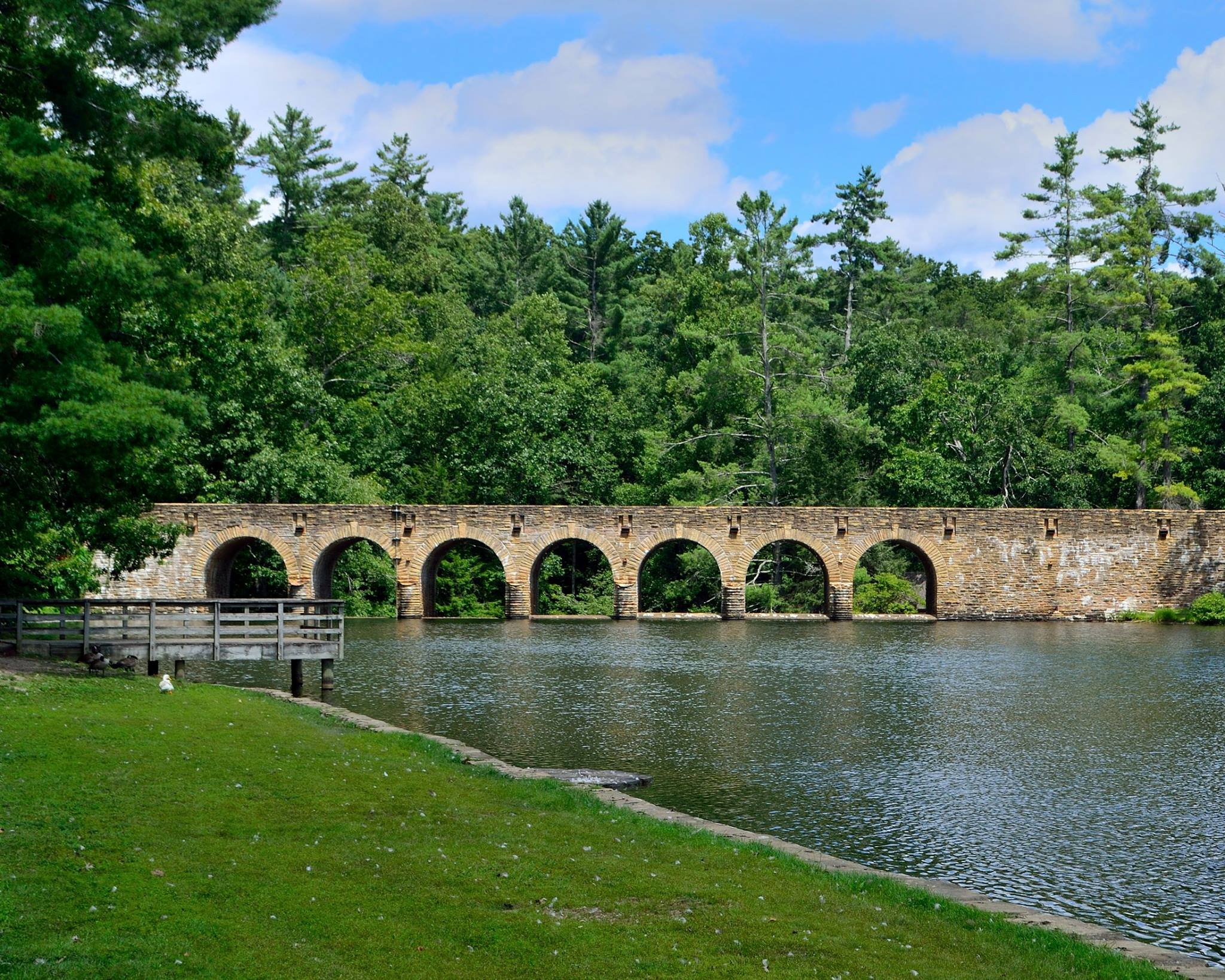
- Byrd Creek Dam
- Interactive map of Cumberland Mountain State Park
- Type: Tennessee State Park
- Location: Cumberland County, Tennessee
- Coordinates: 35.90056°N 84.99710°W
- Area: 1,720 acres (7.0 km^{2})
- Operator: Tennessee Department of Environment and Conservation
- Website: Official website

Cumberland Mountain State Park is a state park in Cumberland County, Tennessee, in the southeastern United States. The park consists of 1,720 acres (7.0 km^{2}) situated around Byrd Lake, a man-made lake created by the impoundment of Byrd Creek in the 1930s. The park is set amidst an environmental microcosm of the Cumberland Plateau and provides numerous recreational activities, including an 18-hole Bear Trace golf course.

Cumberland Mountain State Park began as part of the greater Cumberland Homesteads Project, a New Deal-era initiative by the Resettlement Administration that helped relocate poverty-stricken families on the Cumberland Plateau to small farms centered on what is now the Cumberland Homestead community. The families of Homestead built the park with help from the Civilian Conservation Corps and the Works Progress Administration.

The park was deeded to the state of Tennessee in 1938. Alvin C. York served as the park's superintendent until 1940, when he resigned to advise on the filming of Sergeant York.

== Geographical setting ==
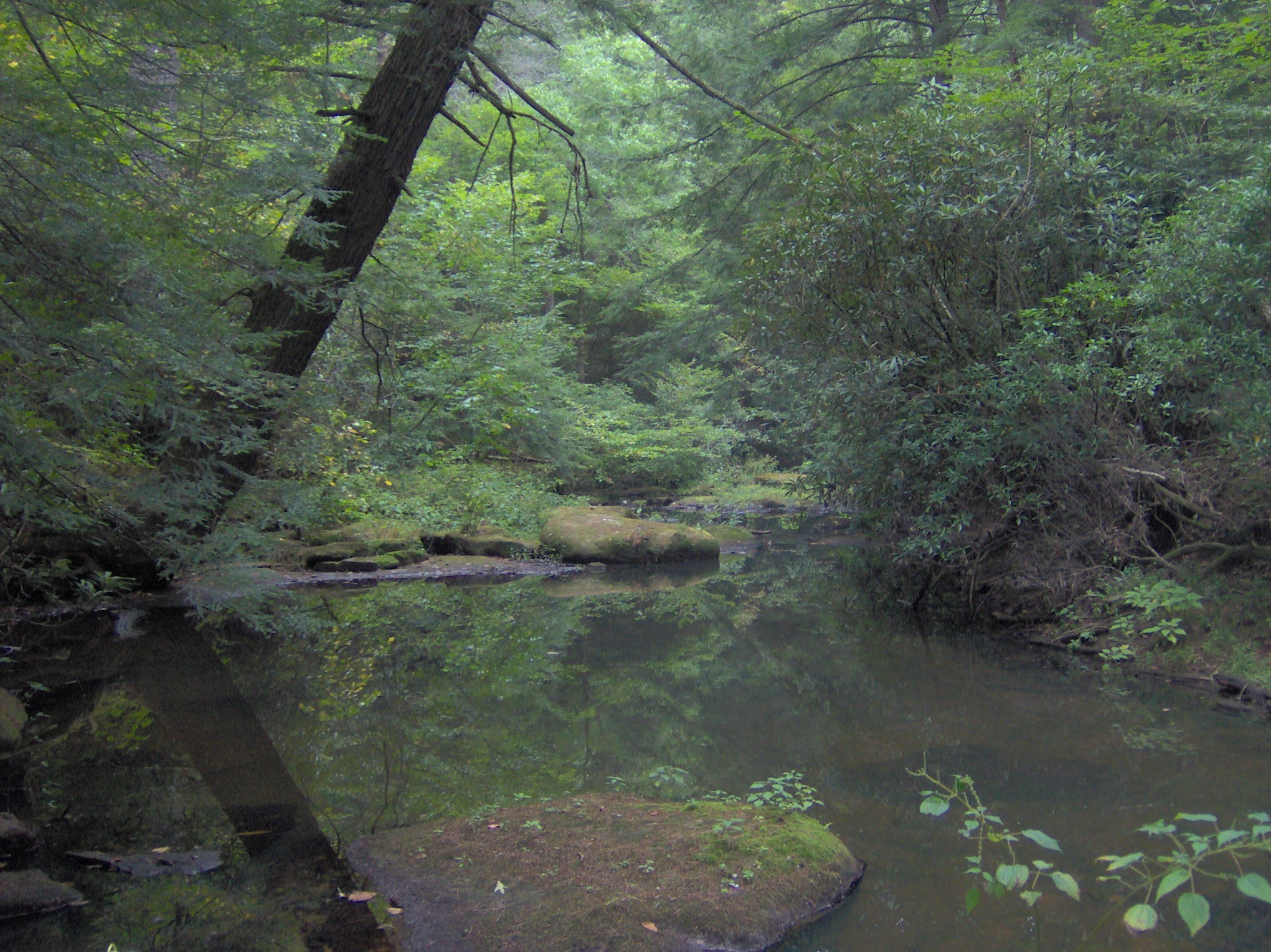
Byrd Creek, downstream from the dam

Cumberland Mountain State Park is situated atop the Cumberland Plateau approximately halfway between the plateau's Walden Ridge escarpment to the east and the plateau's western escarpment to the west. The southern fringe of the Crab Orchard Mountains rise just over 5 miles (8.0 km) to the east, and the northern tip of the Sequatchie Valley is located roughly 10 miles (16 km) to the south. The city of Crossville is located immediately north of the park.

Byrd Creek, the park's major drainage, flows eastward from the hills to the west for approximately 5 miles (8.0 km) before veering north at its confluence with Coon Hollow Branch. The Byrd Creek Dam, which is located immediately north of this confluence, retains a reservoir that covers approximately 50 acres (0.20 km^{2}). Beyond the dam, Byrd Creek absorbs Threemile Creek, which flows from the west, and continues eastward for another 10 miles (16 km) before emptying into Daddys Creek (a tributary of the Obed River) near Crab Orchard. Cumberland Mountain State Park forms a semicircle around Byrd Creek and Threemile Creek, with Byrd Lake being the eastern or "closed" half of the circle.

The park's main entrance is located along Tennessee State Route 419 (Pigeon Ridge Road) just west of Homestead. U.S. Route 127, which intersects SR 419 at Homestead, connects the area with Crossville and Interstate 40 to the north and the Sequatchie Valley to the south. Tennessee State Route 68, which also intersects US 127 at Homestead, connects the area to Spring City in the Tennessee Valley to the east.

== History ==
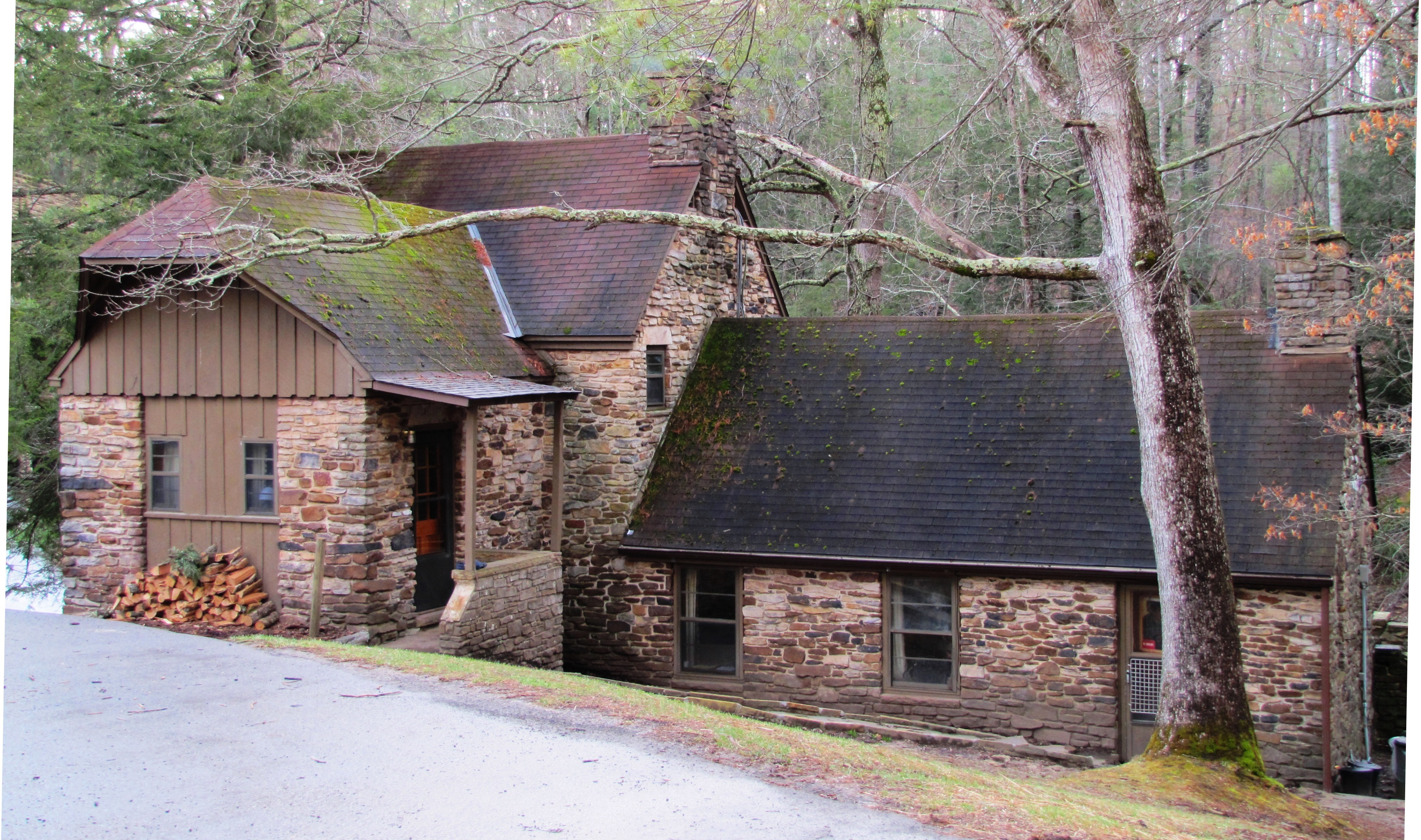
Mill House Lodge, built by the CCC in the 1930s

In 1933, at the height of the Great Depression, the U.S. government established the Subsistence Homesteads Project to aide poverty-stricken families by relocating them to small farms. The government essentially provided low-interest loans that helped families acquire and clear land, build houses and outbuildings, and plant crops. Shortly after the project was established, several businessmen and political leaders from across Tennessee convened and drafted a proposal to have a homesteads project established in the Cumberland Plateau region, which had been particularly hard hit by the Depression when dozens of coal mines in the region were forced to close. The Division of Subsistence Homesteads accepted the proposal in January 1934, and established Cumberland Homesteads, Inc. to oversee the project. The new firm chose a 27,000-acre (110 km^{2}) tract south of Crossville for the location of the project's farms and communal structures. The Civil Works Administration hired several hundred Crossvillians to clear and prepare the land for the homesteads, helping to ease the Depression in Cumberland County. In 1935, 250 families were selected for the project from over 1,500 applicants.

Part of the Cumberland Homesteads Project called for the construction of a recreational area near the center of the homesteads. Two New Deal agencies, the Works Progress Administration and the Civilian Conservation Corps, arrived in the area in 1934 to build the recreational area's facilities. Company 3464 of the CCC, under the direction of the National Park Service, began the construction of Byrd Creek Dam in 1935 and completed it in 1938, effectively creating the 50-acre (0.20 km^{2}) Byrd Lake. The dam, like many of the Homestead structures, is constructed of a native sandstone commonly called Crab Orchard Stone. At a height of 28 feet (8.5 m) and length of 319 feet (97 m), the dam is the largest masonry project ever completed by the CCC. CCC Company 3464, assisted by Company 1471, continued to work at the park until 1941, building trails, picnic areas, cabins, a boathouse, a bathhouse, and other structures.

The Mill House Lodge, located near the dam, was originally built to house a gristmill that would serve the Cumberland Homesteaders. A group of local Quakers were brought in to construct the mill, although opposition from local mills— who considered a federally subsidized mill unfair competition— forced Cumberland Homesteads to nix the project. The mill house had been completed, but the waterwheel and grinding mechanisms were never installed.

The State of Tennessee acquired the park in 1938, and the park officially opened in 1940. Numerous new facilities were constructed at the park between 1948 and 1962, and a new visitor center and swimming pool were built in the 1980s. An 18-hole "Bear Trace" golf course— one of five Bear Traces designed for the State of Tennessee by golfer Jack Nicklaus— opened at Cumberland Mountain State Park in 1998. In 1988, many of the park's original buildings were listed on the National Register of Historic Places as part of the Cumberland Homesteads Historic District.

== The park today ==
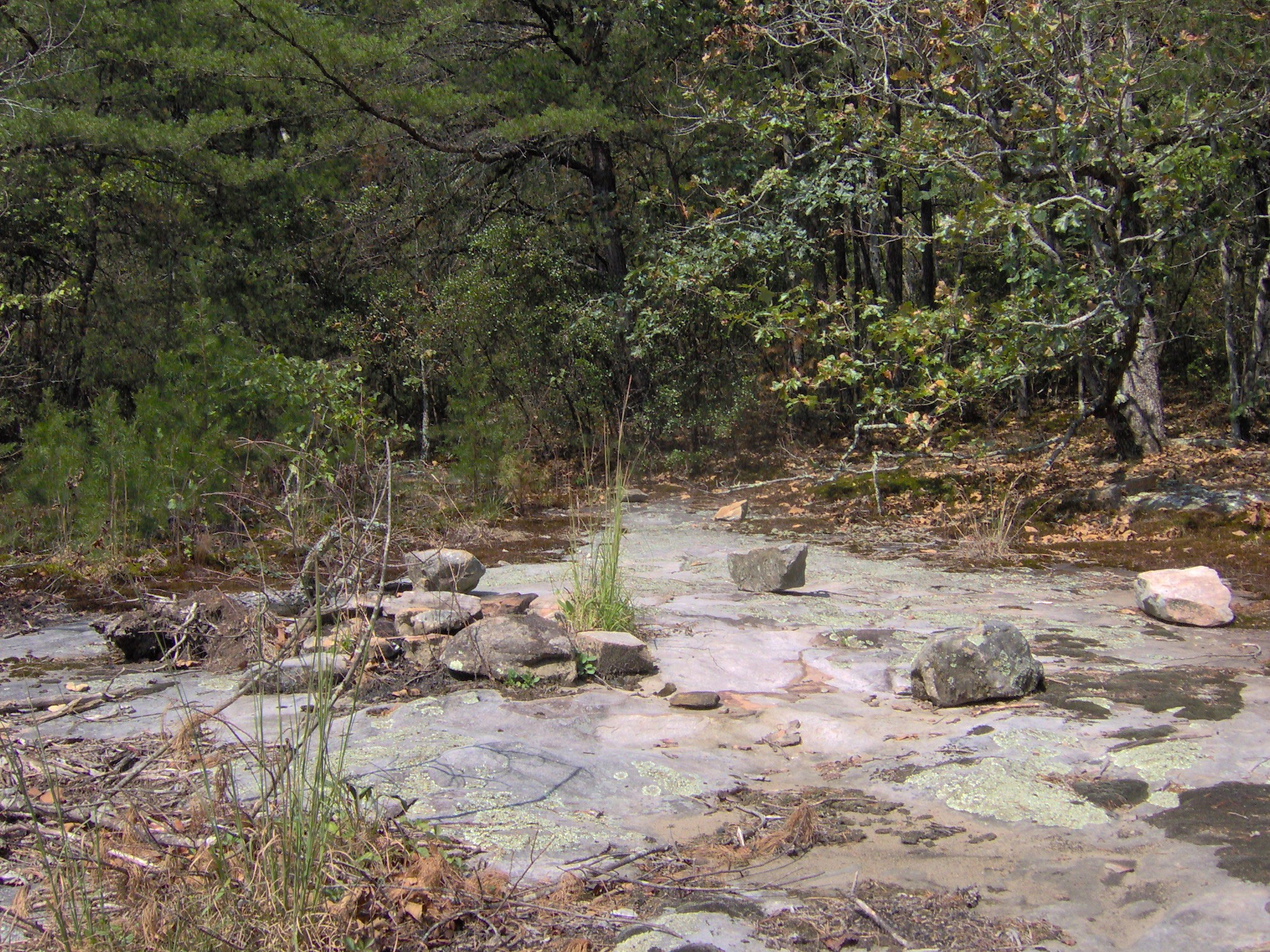
Backcountry campsite along the Cumberland Overnight Trail

Cumberland Mountain State Park currently maintains 37 rustic cabins, each of which can accommodate 4 to 10 people, depending on size. The Mill House Lodge was renovated in 2020 and can accommodate 6 people. There are a total of 147 campsites at the park's campgrounds, and one backcountry campsite located along the Cumberland Overnight Trail.

Recreational facilities include an olympic-sized swimming pool, picnic pavilions, playgrounds, four tennis courts, horseshoe pits, and shuffleboard, basketball, badminton, and volleyball courts. The Bear Trace golf course is a 6,900-yard (6,300 m), par 72 course open year-round. Byrd Lake provides fishing and paddle boating opportunities.

Several miles of hiking trails meander through the park, mostly following Byrd Creek and adjacent hills. The 5-mile (8.0 km) Pioneer Trail loops through the hemlock forest along the shores of Byrd Lake and Byrd Lake's headwaters. The 1-mile (1.6 km) Cumberland Plateau Trail is a self-guided interpretive trail that loops through a diverse forest stand downstream from the dam. The Byrd Creek Trail is a 2.1-mile (3.4 km) extension of the Cumberland Plateau Trail that loops around the banks of Byrd Creek. The Cumberland Overnight Trail is a 6-mile (9.7 km) extension of the Byrd Creek Trail that winds through the hills flanking Threemile Creek. The backcountry campsite is located in a cedar flat near the overnight trail's halfway point.

== Cumberland Homesteads Tower Museum ==
The Cumberland Homesteads Tower Museum, located 1 mile (1.6 km) outside of the park and not owned by the park, recalls the development of the Cumberland Homestead Community of the 1930s. The octagonal Cumberlands Tower was originally constructed by the CCC between 1937 and 1938 using Crab Orchard Stone to house the Cumberland Homesteads offices. The tower features a water tank and a 97-step stairway to the lookout platform at the top with views of the park. The base features a museum with exhibits about the history of the Homesteads project and its residents, and period displays. Visitors can also tour an original Homesteads house which has been furnished to appear as during the Depression.

== See also ==
- List of Tennessee state parks
