= Fairfield Glade, Tennessee =

- Census-designated place
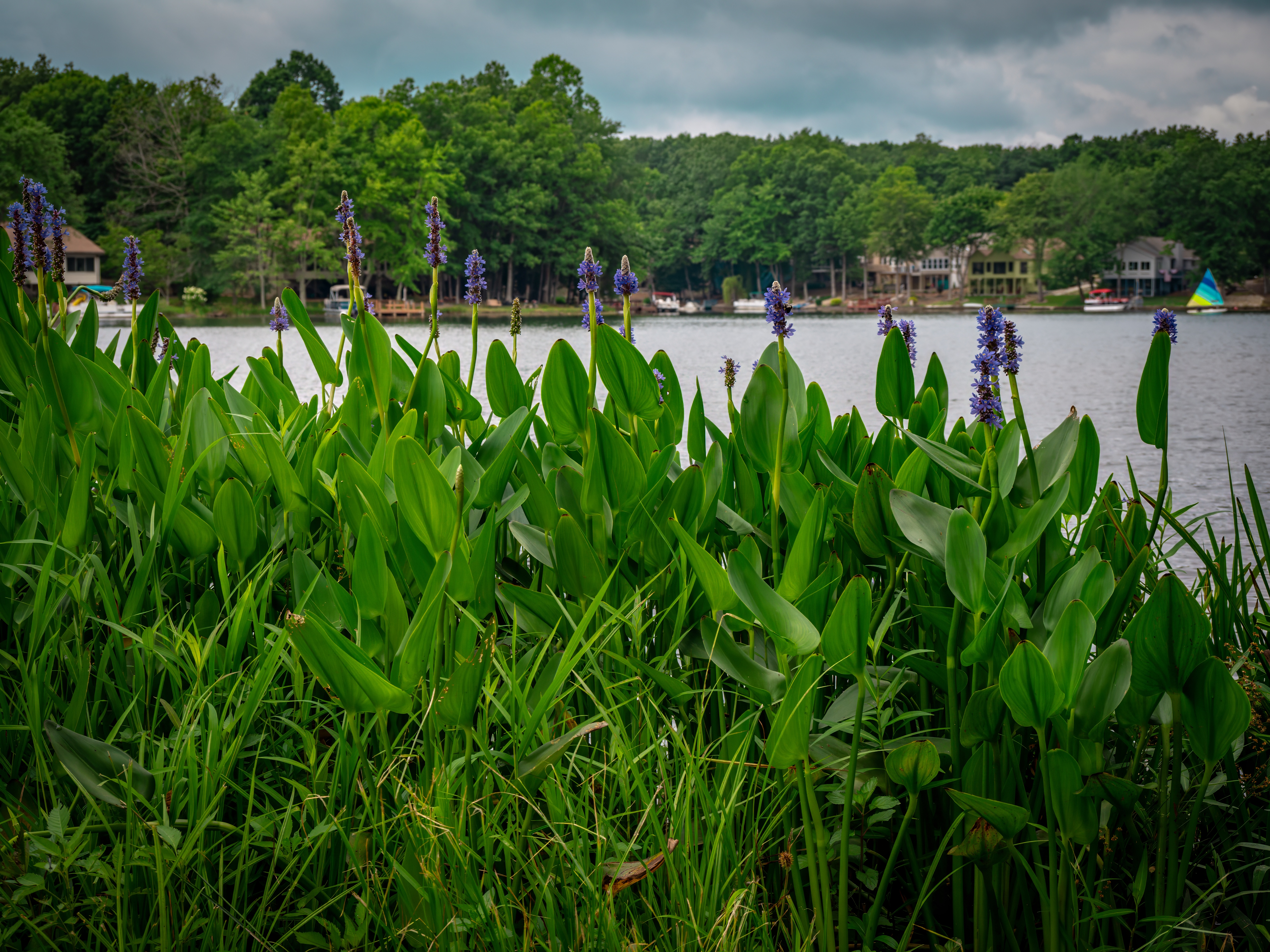
- Houses along a lake in Fairfield Glade in 2024

- Location of Fairfield Glade, Tennessee
- Coordinates: 35°59′40″N 84°53′6″W
- Country: United States
- State: Tennessee
- County: Cumberland

Government
  - Type: Community organization (Fairfield Glade Community Club)

Area
  - Total: 23.48 sq mi (60.80 km^{2})
  - Land: 23.00 sq mi (59.57 km^{2})
  - Water: 0.48 sq mi (1.24 km^{2})
- Elevation: 2,087 ft (636 m)

Population (2020)
  - Total: 9,152
  - Density: 397.9/sq mi (153.64/km^{2})
- Time zone: UTC-6 (Central (CST))
  - Summer (DST): UTC-5 (CDT)
- ZIP codes: 38558 & 38571
- Area code: 931
- FIPS code: 47-24980
- GNIS feature ID: 1315036

Fairfield Glade is a resort, retirement community and census-designated place (CDP) in Cumberland County, Tennessee, United States. The population was 9,152 at the 2020 census, up over 3,000 from the 2010 census.

== Geography ==
Fairfield Glade is located in eastern Cumberland County at 35°59′40″N 84°53′6″W (35.994355, -84.884986). It is situated on several ridges and valleys on the Cumberland Plateau and is bordered to the east by the valley of Daddys Creek, a tributary of the Obed River, and to the north by the state Catoosa Wildlife Management Area. Crossville, the Cumberland County seat, is 9 miles (14 km) to the southwest via Tennessee State Route 101.

According to the United States Census Bureau, the CDP has a total area of 23.5 square miles (60.8 km^{2}), of which 22.7 square miles (58.9 km^{2}) is land and 0.73 square miles (1.9 km^{2}), or 3.19%, is water.

== Demographics ==
Historical population
Census	Pop.	Note	%±
2020	9,152		—
U.S. Decennial Census

=== 2020 census ===
Fairfield Glade racial composition
Race	Number	Percentage
White (non-Hispanic)	8,581	93.76%
Black or African American (non-Hispanic)	67	0.73%
Native American	14	0.15%
Asian	32	0.35%
Other/Mixed	253	2.76%
Hispanic or Latino	205	2.24%

As of the 2020 United States census, there were 9,152 people, 4,574 households, and 3,426 families residing in the CDP.

=== 2000 census ===
As of the census of 2000, there were 4,885 people, 2,513 households, and 2,017 families residing in the CDP. The population density was 224.2 inhabitants per square mile (86.6/km^{2}). There were 3,118 housing units at an average density of 143.1 per square mile (55.3/km^{2}). The racial makeup of the CDP was 98.57% White, 0.53% African American, 0.04% Native American, 0.18% Asian, 0.04% Pacific Islander, 0.25% from other races, and 0.39% from two or more races. Hispanic or Latino of any race were 0.43% of the population.

There were 2,513 households, out of which 4.5% had children under the age of 18 living with them, 76.8% were married couples living together, 2.9% had a female householder with no husband present, and 19.7% were non-families. 18.0% of all households were made up of individuals, and 12.6% had someone living alone who was 65 years of age or older. The average household size was 1.94 and the average family size was 2.15.

In the CDP, the population was spread out, with 4.4% under the age of 18, 1.5% from 18 to 24, 6.5% from 25 to 44, 33.1% from 45 to 64, and 54.5% who were 65 years of age or older. The median age was 66 years. For every 100 females, there were 91.9 males. For every 100 females age 18 and over, there were 90.5 males.

The median income for a household in the CDP was $42,800, and the median income for a family was $45,938. Males had a median income of $37,404 versus $22,500 for females. The per capita income for the CDP was $26,403. About 1.6% of families and 2.3% of the population were below the poverty line, including none of those under age 18 and 0.3% of those age 65 or over.

== Recreation facilities ==
Recreation facilities at Fairfield Glade include five 18-hole golf courses, several tennis courts, pickleball courts, swimming pools (1 year-round indoor and 2 seasonal outdoor), and 11 fishing lakes, the two largest of which have marinas and swimming areas.

The New Fairfield Glade Community Center features an indoor pool, gymnasium, locker rooms, shower facilities, game room, arts & crafts center, concessions, meeting rooms, media rooms, and a banquet room.

== Community management and governance ==
Fairfield Glade is not an incorporated municipality, but is managed by the Fairfield Glade Community Club, a homeowner's association. Association responsibilities include enforcement of architectural standards, maintenance and operation of the golf courses and other resort amenities, road maintenance, and operation of the community's sewage treatment plant.

Some residences in Fairfield Glade are in timeshare ownership and are occupied for short periods by visitors.

Fairfield Glade also has their own police department.
