= Lake Tansi Village, Tennessee =

- CDP
- Location of Lake Tansi Village, Tennessee
- Coordinates: 35°52′29″N 85°3′5″W
- Country: United States
- State: Tennessee
- County: Cumberland

Area
  - Total: 9.58 sq mi (24.81 km^{2})
  - Land: 8.82 sq mi (22.85 km^{2})
  - Water: 0.75 sq mi (1.95 km^{2})
- Elevation: 1,919 ft (585 m)

Population (2020)
  - Total: 4,629
  - Density: 524.6/sq mi (202.55/km^{2})
- Time zone: UTC-6 (Central (CST))
  - Summer (DST): UTC-5 (CDT)
- Zip code: 38572
- Area code: 931
- FIPS code: 47-40560
- GNIS feature ID: 1852675
- Website: http://www.laketansipoa.com/

Lake Tansi Village (also known as Lake Tansi) is a resort community in Cumberland County, Tennessee, United States, recognized by the U.S. Census as a census-designated place (CDP). The population was 4,629 at the 2020 census.

== Geography ==
Lake Tansi Village is located at 35°52′29″N 85°3′5″W (35.874617, -85.051490).

According to the United States Census Bureau, the CDP has a total area of 9.5 square miles (25 km^{2}), of which, 8.7 square miles (23 km^{2}) of it is land and 0.8 square miles (2.1 km^{2}) of it (8.12%) is water.

== Demographics ==
Historical population
Census	Pop.	Note	%±
2020	4,629		—
U.S. Decennial Census

=== 2020 census ===
Lake Tansi racial composition
Race	Number	Percentage
White (non-Hispanic)	4,334	93.63%
Black or African American (non-Hispanic)	11	0.24%
Native American	8	0.17%
Asian	11	0.24%
Pacific Islander	1	0.02%
Other/Mixed	173	3.74%
Hispanic or Latino	91	1.97%

As of the 2020 United States census, there were 4,629 people, 1,925 households, and 1,379 families residing in the CDP.

=== 2000 census ===
As of the census of 2000, there were 2,621 people, 1,166 households, and 875 families residing in the CDP. The population density was 301.0 inhabitants per square mile (116.2/km^{2}). There were 1,735 housing units at an average density of 199.2 per square mile (76.9/km^{2}). The racial makeup of the CDP was 98.40% White, 0.08% African American, 0.31% Native American, 0.31% Asian, 0.11% from other races, and 0.80% from two or more races. Hispanic or Latino of any race were 0.84% of the population.

There were 1,166 households, out of which 22.6% had children under the age of 18 living with them, 63.2% were married couples living together, 9.3% had a female householder with no husband present, and 24.9% were non-families. 21.2% of all households were made up of individuals, and 10.3% had someone living alone who was 65 years of age or older. The average household size was 2.25 and the average family size was 2.56.

In the CDP, the population was spread out, with 19.0% under the age of 18, 5.5% from 18 to 24, 22.0% from 25 to 44, 28.8% from 45 to 64, and 24.7% who were 65 years of age or older. The median age was 48 years. For every 100 females, there were 92.0 males. For every 100 females age 18 and over, there were 89.6 males.

The median income for a household in the CDP was $29,697, and the median income for a family was $32,671. Males had a median income of $25,174 versus $21,359 for females. The per capita income for the CDP was $15,749. About 12.6% of families and 21.7% of the population were below the poverty line, including 49.0% of those under age 18 and 6.1% of those age 65 or over.

== Recreation ==
The Thunderbird Recreation Center serves Lake Tansi Village with many different activities. It underwent renovations in 2008.
