= Tennessee State Route 295 =

State highway in Tennessee, United States

State Route 295
- Parker Road
- SR 295 highlighted in red

Route information
- Maintained by TDOT
- Length: 5.0 mi (8.0 km)
- Existed: July 1, 1983–present

Major junctions
- West end: SR 111 in Byrdstown
- East end: US 127 northwest of Pall Mall

Location
- Country: United States
- State: Tennessee
- Counties: Pickett

Highway system
- Tennessee State Routes; Interstate; US; State
← SR 294	→ SR 296

State Route 295 (SR 295) is a 5.0-mile-long (8.0 km) state highway in Pickett County, Tennessee, connecting SR 111 in Byrdstown to US 127/SR 28 near Pall Mall. For the majority of its length, SR 295 is known as Parker Road.

== Route description ==
SR 295 begins in Byrdstown at an intersection with SR 111 north of downtown. It goes southeast for approximately 300 feet (91 m) as North Main Street before turning east along Parker Road; North Main Street continues south into downtown. The highway then leaves Byrdstown and winds its way east through slightly rugged terrain to cross a bridge over the Wolf River before continuing east through farmland and passing through the Asbury community. SR 295 then comes to an end shortly thereafter at an intersection with US 127/SR 28 northwest of Pall Mall.

The entire route of SR 295 is a rural two-lane highway.

== Major intersections ==
The entire route is in Pickett County.

Location	mi	km	Destinations	Notes
Byrdstown	0.0	0.0	SR 111 – Livingston, Static, Albany, KY	Western terminus; provides access to Dale Hollow Lake and Cordell Hull Birthplace State Park
Byrdstown	0.1	0.16	North Main Street – Downtown	Former SR 42
	0.5	0.80	Bridge over the Wolf River	
	5.0	8.0	US 127 (North York Highway/SR 28) – Albany, KY, Static, Pall Mall, Jamestown	Eastern terminus; provides access to Sgt. Alvin C. York State Historic Park
1.000 mi = 1.609 km; 1.000 km = 0.621 mi
