= Tennessee State Route 111 =

State highway in Tennessee, United States

State Route 111
- TN 111 highlighted in red

Route information
- Maintained by TDOT
- Length: 116 mi (187 km)
- Tourist routes: Cumberland Historic Byway

Major junctions
- South end: US 27 in Soddy-Daisy
- US 127 / SR 8 in Dunlap; SR 30 in Spencer; US 70S / SR 1 in Sparta; US 70 in Sparta; I-40 in Cookeville; US 70N in Cookeville; SR 52 in Livingston
- North end: US 127 at the Kentucky state line in Static

Location
- Country: United States
- State: Tennessee
- Counties: Hamilton, Sequatchie, Van Buren, White, Putnam, Overton, Pickett

Highway system
- Tennessee State Routes; Interstate; US; State
← SR 110	→ SR 112

State Route 111 (SR 111) is a north–south highway in Middle and East Tennessee. The road begins in Soddy-Daisy and ends north of Byrdstown in the community of Static, at the Tennessee/Kentucky state line. The length is 116 mi (186.7 km).

== Route description ==
The highway begins at an interchange with U.S. Route 27/SR 29 (US 27/SR 29) in Soddy-Daisy. SR 111 travels generally northwest as a controlled access highway before it crosses into Sequatchie County. The controlled-access sections of SR 111 are unusual, as they contain 70 mph speed limits, which are generally reserved for Interstate highways. It then proceeds over Walden Ridge and into the Sequatchie Valley, where it comes to an interchange with US 127 and starts a concurrency with SR 8 in Dunlap, where the freeway ends. The concurrency goes up the Cumberland Plateau, continuing as a 4-lane road, albeit without a dividing median or wide shoulders, and into the northern part of the county where it narrows to an improved two-lane road and SR 8 splits off and continues to McMinnville. SR 111 turns north at this point and crosses into Van Buren County. Beyond this point, the entire road until passing Livingston is either a four-lane divided highway or a five-lane road with a continuous center turn lane, in both cases with wide, paved shoulders.

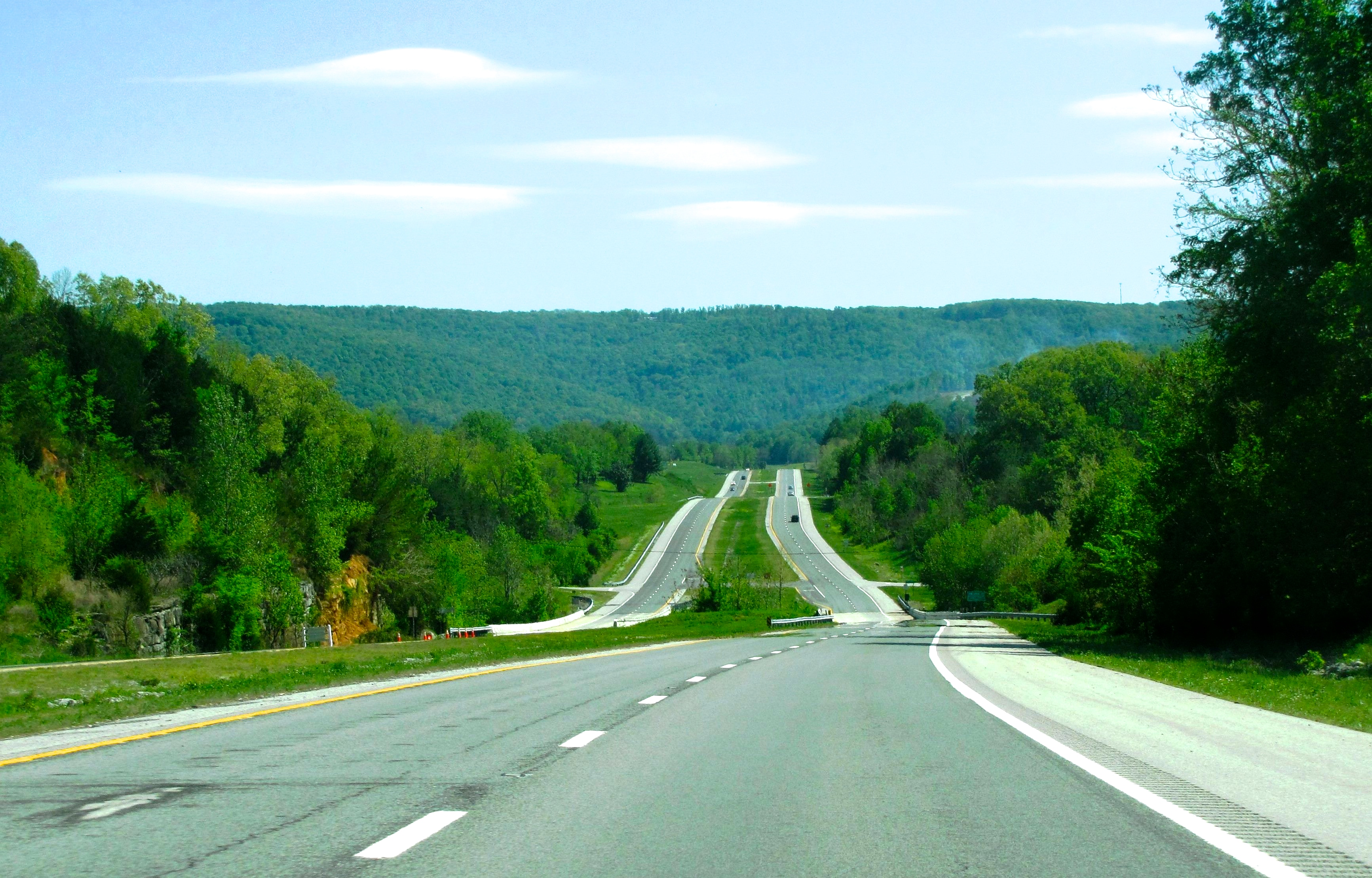
SR 111 approaching the Cumberland Plateau, near Spencer

In Van Buren County, the highway travels through the small town of Spencer, passing just west of Fall Creek Falls State Park, and continues into White County at the Caney Fork River. In this area SR 111 runs a brief concurrency with SR 285. The highway then proceeds north as Harold "Mose" Sims Memorial Highway and joins the concurrency of US 70S/SR 1. The concurrency continues to the west side of Sparta, at which point the highways split up and SR 111 becomes controlled access again, continuing north into Putnam County.

Entering Putnam County by crossing the Falling Water River, the highway runs a brief concurrency with SR 136 before continuing north and passing through eastern Cookeville, once again losing its status as a controlled-access highway. Here it intersects Interstate 40 (I-40) and US 70N as it turns north-northeastward and into the town of Algood. After passing Algood, SR 111 turns northeastward and enters Overton County.

In Overton County, SR 111 becomes Cookeville Highway and then Veterans Memorial Parkway as it approaches Livingston. It becomes a bypass around the northwest of town, known as Bradford Hicks Drive, before exiting Livingston as an improved two-lane highway and continuing northeast as Byrdstown Highway. It crosses into Pickett County and becomes Livingston Highway. Then, it crosses the Obey River, impounded as Dale Hollow Lake, and enters Byrdstown.

After bypassing the center of Byrdstown, the highway continues northeastward as Robert H. Roberts Memorial Highway before ending at US 127/SR 28 in Static, just yards from the Kentucky state line. From this intersection, US 127 runs northwestward to Albany, Kentucky, and southeastward toward Jamestown, Tennessee, while Kentucky Route 1076 (KY 1076) continues northeastward to KY 696, which crosses Poplar Mountain in the direction of Monticello, Kentucky. If not for the mountain, this would be the straightest route along the western edge of the Cumberland Plateau from Byrdstown to Monticello (and from I-40 at Cookeville to I-75 at Mount Vernon, Kentucky). With the creation of interchanges in Pulaski County, Kentucky, has been suggested that SR 111 and parts of US 127, KY 90, the south end of KY 1247, the north end of KY 914, KY 80 and KY 461 be renumbered US 111 (a route that no longer exists) to create a major-numbered route along the scenic western edge of the plateau, connecting Interstates 75, 40, and 24.

== History ==
SR 111 existed by 1938, but only as a short portion of the current SR 111 route between the town of Spencer in Van Buren County and Doyle in White County and maintained this alignment at least through 1951. By 1963, it had been extended south from Spencer to the SR 8 junction in Sequatchie County north of Cagle. Between 1975 and 1978, SR 111 was extended north to Cookeville replacing SR 42 in that section. In October 1980, the new section bypassing Algood opened to traffic. Between 1987 and 1989 the highway was extended northward over the remainder of the path of SR 42 to Static; this section was signed as SR 24 prior to the mid-1930s. Between 1988 and 1994, the section between SR 8 in Dunlap and US 27 between Soddy-Daisy and Bakewell was built. This extension was four lanes on the downgrades of Walden Ridge, and two lanes elsewhere, with the intent of eventually expanding the entirety to four lanes. The section opened to traffic on December 13, 1994, and cost $96 million (equivalent to $184 million in 2024). This was expanded to a four-lane controlled-access highway between 2001 and 2004, which included replacing the four-way intersection with US 127 with an overpass and interchange.

=== State Route 42 ===
State Route 42
- Location: Sparta to Static
- Existed: October 1, 1923–1989

State Route 42 (SR 42) was the former designation of a state highway in Tennessee that ran from US 70S in Sparta north through Cookeville, and ending in the town of Static at US 127 near the Kentucky state line. The number was decommissioned when SR 111 was created. Except for a few bypasses, SR 111 follows the entire route of former SR 42.

== Major intersections ==
County	Location	mi	km	Destinations	Notes
Hamilton	Soddy-Daisy	0.0	0.0	US 27 (SR 29) – Chattanooga, Dayton	Southern terminus; freeway continues as US 27 south (SR 29 south)
Hamilton	Soddy-Daisy	0.8	1.3	Back Valley Road	
Hamilton		4.4	7.1	Jones Gap Road	
Sequatchie		10.9	17.5	Lewis Chapel Road	
Sequatchie		14.6	23.5	East Valley Road	
Sequatchie	Dunlap	17	27	US 127 (Rankin Avenue/SR 8 south/SR 28) – Pikeville, Dunlap	Northern end of freeway; southern end of SR 8 concurrency; interchange
Sequatchie	Cagle	25.3	40.7	SR 399 west (Rifle Range Road) – Palmer, Gruetli-Laager	Eastern terminus of SR 399; provides access to Savage Gulf State Natural Area (South Cumberland State Park)
Sequatchie		29.3	47.2	SR 8 north – McMinnville	Northern end of SR 8 concurrency
Van Buren		36	58	SR 284 east (Baker Mountain Road) – Fall Creek Falls State Park	Interchange; western terminus of SR 284
Van Buren	Spencer	44.1	71.0	SR 30 (College Street) – McMinnville, Pikeville, Fall Creek Falls State Park	Interchange via access road; provides access to downtown
Van Buren		48.6	78.2	SR 285 east (Cane Creek Cummingsville Road)	Southern end of SR 285 concurrency
White		50.4	81.1	SR 285 west (Gooseneck Road) – Doyle	Northern end of SR 285 concurrency
White		52.9	85.1	US 70S west (Memorial Highway/SR 1 west) – McMinnville	Southern end of US 70S/SR 1 concurrency; interchange; provides access to Rock Island State Park
White	Sparta	56.4	90.8	SR 1 east (Mayberry Street) – Sparta	Interchange; northern end of SR 1 concurrency
White	Sparta	57.8	93.0	US 70S end / US 70 (W Bockman Way/SR 26) – Sparta, Smithville	Interchange; eastern terminus of US 70S
White	Sparta	59.8	96.2	SR 289 south (N Spring Street) – Sparta	Interchange; northern terminus of SR 289; south end of freeway
White		61.7	99.3	SR 135 (Burgess Falls Road)	Interchange
White		63.5	102.2	O'Connor Road	Interchange
White	Hampton Crossroads	66.1	106.4	SR 136 south (Old Kentucky Road) – Hampton Crossroads	South end of SR 136 concurrency; interchange; provides access to Upper Cumberland Regional Airport
Putnam	Cookeville	69.3	111.5	SR 136 north (S Jefferson Avenue) – Cookeville	North end of SR 136 concurrency; interchange; north end of freeway
Putnam	Cookeville	71.9	115.7	I-40 – Nashville, Knoxville	I-40 exit 288; interchange; at-grade on SR 111
Putnam	Cookeville	73.1	117.6	US 70N (E Spring Street/SR 24) – Cookeville, Monterey	Interchange; south end of freeway
Putnam	Cookeville	75.2	121.0	Cookeville, Algood (10th Street)	Interchange; north end of freeway
Overton	Rickman	83.7	134.7	SR 293 east (Rickman Monterey Highway) – Rickman	Southern end of SR 293 concurrency
Overton	Rickman	83.9	135.0	SR 293 west (Tommy Dodson Highway)	Northern end of SR 293 concurrency
Overton	Livingston	90.1	145.0	SR 84 – Monterey	Interchange; at-grade on SR 111
Overton	Livingston	91.1	146.6	SR 85 west (Hilham Highway) – Gainesboro	Southern end of SR 85 concurrency
Overton	Livingston	91.5	147.3	SR 85 east (Main Street) – Livingston	Northern end of SR 85 concurrency
Overton	Livingston	92.8	149.3	SR 52 (Celina Highway/Church Street) – Celina, Livingston	Provides access to Standing Stone State Park
Overton	Livingston	94.3	151.8	SR 294 south (East Main Street) – Livingston	Southern end of SR 294 concurrency
Overton	Monroe	97.8	157.4	SR 294 north (Willow Grove Highway) – Dale Hollow Lake	Northern end of SR 294 concurrency
Pickett	Byrdstown	109.9	176.9	SR 325 west (Cordell Hull Memorial Drive) – Cordell Hull Birthplace State Park	Southern end of SR 325 concurrency; provides access to Dale Hollow Lake
Pickett	Byrdstown	110.6	178.0	SR 325 east (West Main Street) – Byrdstown Business District	Northern end of SR 325 concurrency; provides access to Sgt. Alvin C. York State Historic Park
Pickett	Byrdstown	112.4	180.9	SR 295 east (North Main Street) – Downtown	Western terminus of SR 295
Pickett	Static	116	187	US 127 (N York Highway/SR 28 south) – Albany KY, Jamestown, Sgt. Alvin C. York State Historic Park	Northern terminus; northern terminus of SR 28; road continues into Kentucky as US 127 north
1.000 mi = 1.609 km; 1.000 km = 0.621 mi: Concurrency terminus
