= Billy Dean Anderson =

American criminal

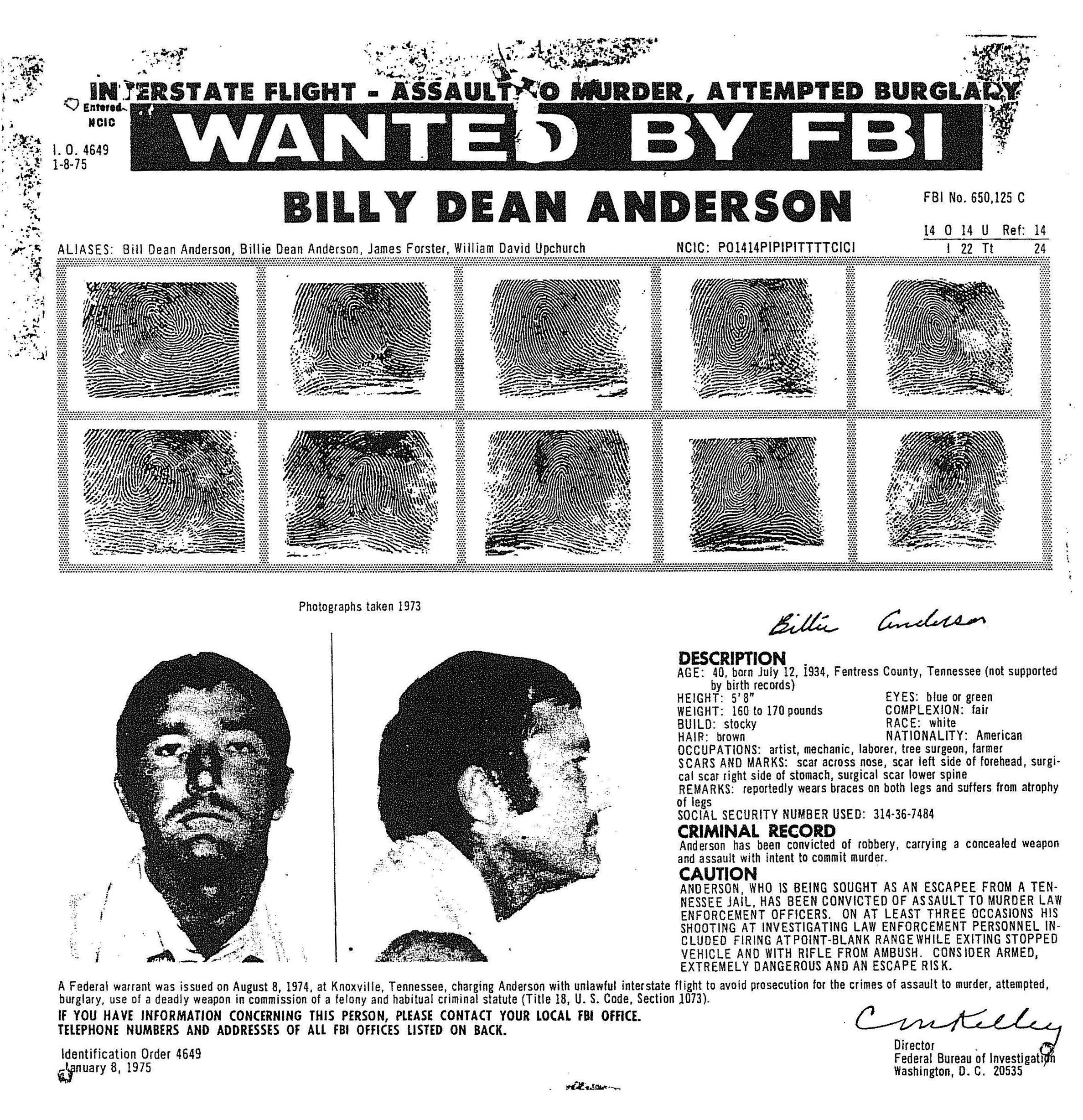
- Wanted Poster for Billy Dean Anderson

FBI Ten Most Wanted Fugitive
- Charges: Armed robbery; Escape; Assault to murder a police officer

Description
- Born: July 12, 1934; Pall Mall area Fentress County, Tennessee
- Died: July 7, 1979 (aged 44); Pall Mall Fentress County, Tennessee
- Cause of death: Shot

Status
- Added: January 21, 1975 (date FBI added to list)
- Number: 386 (sequence number)
- Killed during capture attempt

Billy Dean Anderson (July 12, 1934 – July 7, 1979) was an American criminal. He was jailed and paroled three times, and his 20 year crime career included armed robbery and prison escapes. He was added to the FBI Ten Most Wanted Fugitives list in 1975. Despite his unlawful behavior, Anderson became somewhat of a folk hero among those in his native Tennessee, even more so after he was shot and killed by FBI officers while evading arrest.

== Early life ==
Anderson was reportedly born in Pall Mall, a community in Fentress County, Tennessee, the same Wolf River valley from which World War I hero Alvin C. York hailed. Little is known about his early life. However, the FBI disputes this birthplace and Anderson's actual hometown remains unconfirmed. He attended Rotten Fork Elementary School, where he preferred to fill his notebooks with sketches rather than homework. However, he was believed not to have been a troublesome youth, and volunteered as a preacher at Wolf River Methodist Church in Pall Mall at age eighteen. He used the aliases "Billie Dean Anderson", "James Forster", and "William David Upchurch". He had a stocky build and stood at 5'8" and weighed between 160 and 170 pounds with fair skin and bluish-green eyes. He worked as an artist, mechanic, unskilled laborer, tree surgeon and farmer. Anderson was severely marked with a scar across the bridge of his nose, the left side of his forehead, a surgical scar on the right side of his stomach and another surgical scar on his lower spine. He reportedly wore braces on both of his legs and suffered from atrophy of the legs.

== Criminal career ==
In June 1959, Anderson and two friends committed armed robbery of a drive-in theater in Jamestown, Tennessee. When the theater usher revealed he possessed little money, Anderson intentionally missed while shooting near him. The three men managed to evade police but were arrested the following morning while engaged in a police standoff while inside the Wolf River Methodist Church in Pall Mall. Anderson served four months in jail, the lenient sentence due to him being a first-time offender.

In October 1962, Anderson brandished a shotgun at a group of state police troopers in Jamestown, which escalated to his shooting an officer. Anderson decided to surrender when a bullet grazed his head, and he was shot twice in the stomach. Anderson received a ten-year prison sentence, and only served four years due to being a model prisoner. At the recommendation of a lawyer, Anderson moved to Muncie, Indiana, in order to leave Tennessee. However, he received a suspended prison term for armed robbery/assault in Muncie, and was banished from the state. When he returned to Tennessee, he was involved in a standoff with the sheriff and a deputy sheriff in Fentress County, and served four years of two consecutive seven-year prison terms.

In 1970, he returned to Muncie, despite his sentence to leave Indiana. While working as a gas station attendant in Muncie, Anderson brandished a pistol at a customer, and was sentenced to a 10- to 25-year sentence at the Indiana State Prison. Anderson was paroled in 1972, and moved to Morgan County, Tennessee, due to his notoriety in Fentress County. In late 1973, he was arrested for non-fatally shooting a deputy sheriff in Morgan County. On January 15, 1974, a Morgan County jury convicted Anderson of aggravated assault, attempted burglary, assault with a deadly weapon, and habitual criminal. That December, he and a fellow inmate escaped from the Morgan County Jail. The escape led to Anderson being placed on the FBI Ten Most Wanted Fugitives list on January 21, 1975.

Labelled "the mountain man" by federal agents, Anderson evaded police for more than four years, by hiding within the mountainous terrain of Pickett County, Tennessee. He was also assisted by local residents, some of whom were involved with moonshine trade and were sympathetic to him. Anderson became self-sufficient and lived in a cave near the Fentress-Pickett line. He accessed the cave through an opening, 3 feet (0.91 m) in diameter, located halfway up the side of a hill and hidden in a rock outcropping. Inside the cave there was a 20-foot (6.1 m) drop to where Anderson had fashioned his home.

According to an FBI release, Anderson's whereabouts were tipped to them by an informant they called the "Mountain Man". This tip led to the death of Anderson as he was leaving the home of his 75-year-old mother in the early hours of July 7, 1979. As he had attempted to run away from the state troopers, he was shot twice in his lower back. The bullet exited through his stomach, and Anderson died immediately as a result of his wounds.

== Legacy ==
Legends abound in Fentress County regarding the man known as Billy Dean Anderson, as his story takes on much the same interest locally as that of Jesse James. There are many legends about his death, including some that say that the authorities only managed to get him because he got tangled in a barbed-wire fence or that he stopped because they tricked his mother into calling his name.

Anderson was a sympathetic figure to many in the area, which had a long history of violence around moonshine stills and logging camps.

Of the five other fugitives placed on the FBI Most Wanted Fugitives List in 1975, Anderson eluded federal authorities for the longest period. His nearly four-and-a-half years on the list were longer than all but nine of the more than 60 placed on the list during the 1970s.

What is not a legend is that Anderson was a gifted painter. While in prison he produced over 300 paintings; most of them were idealized versions of a muscular Christ. He was also an accomplished woodcarver. Brushes and paint were found in his cave hideout in Pickett County.
