= Cordell Hull Birthplace State Park =

State park in Tennessee, United States

Cordell Hull Birthplace State Historic Park
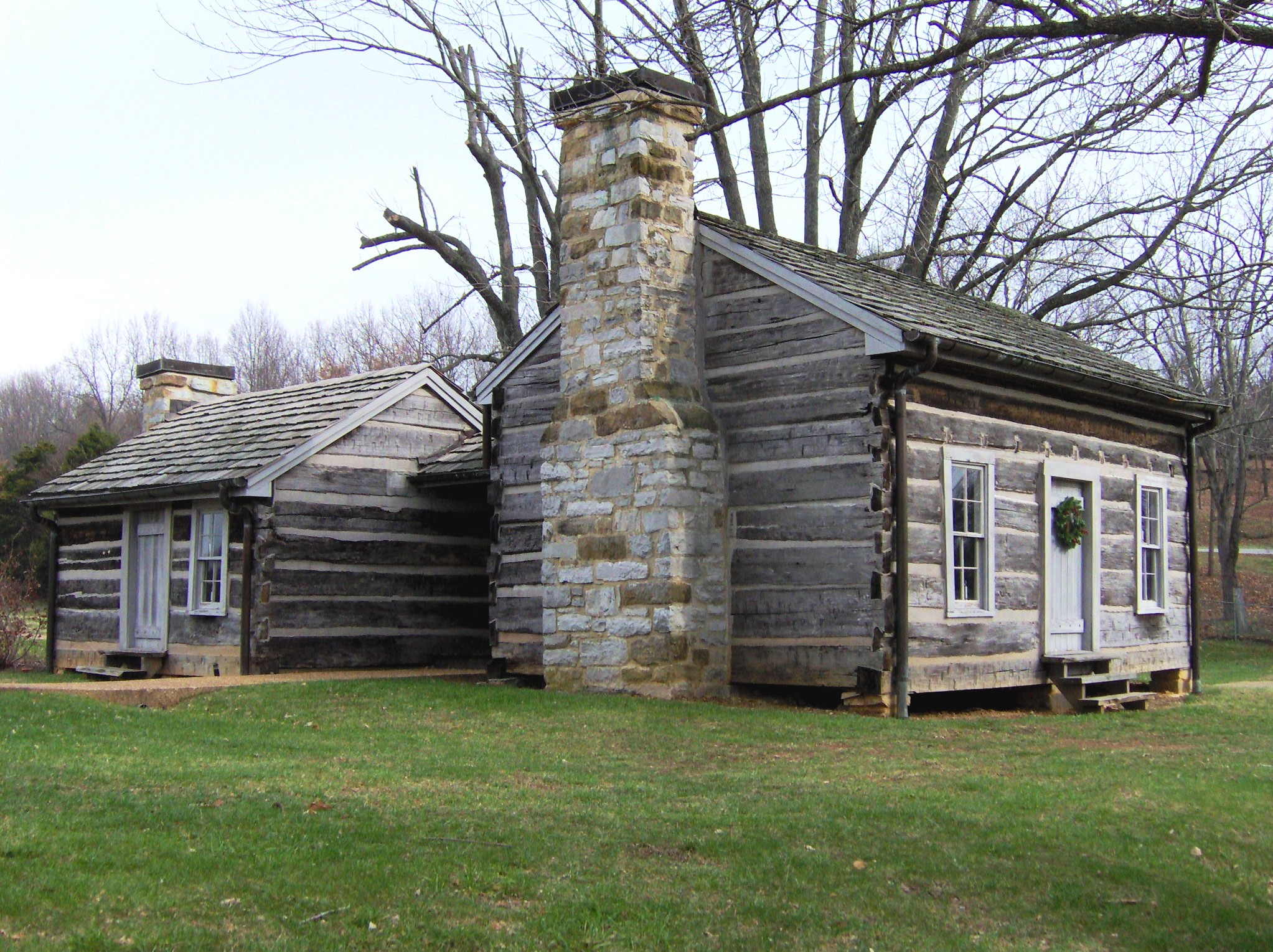
- Cordell Hull Cabin
- Interactive map of Cordell Hull Birthplace State Historic Park
- Type: Tennessee State Park
- Location: Byrdstown, Tennessee
- Area: 58 acres (0.23 km^{2})
- Created: 1997
- Open: Year around
- Website: Cordell Hull Birthplace State Park
- Cordell Hull Birthplace
- U.S. National Register of Historic Places
- Nearest city: Byrdstown, Tennessee
- Coordinates: 36°34′54″N 85°10′55″W
- Built: 1850-1874
- NRHP reference No.: 72001250
- Added to NRHP: 1972

Cordell Hull Birthplace State Park is a state park in Pickett County, Tennessee, in the southeastern United States. Cordell Hull (1871–1955) served as U.S. Secretary of State under President Franklin Roosevelt and played a pivotal role in the creation of the United Nations in the mid-1940s.

== Geographical setting ==
Cordell Hull Birthplace State Park is situated along the Highland Rim, a barren and hilly area where the Cumberland Plateau descends westward into the Central Basin. The site is approximately 4 miles (6.4 km) south of the Wolf River, 4 miles (6.4 km) north of the Obey River, and 7 miles (11 km) east of the confluence of these two rivers at Dale Hollow Lake. The park is located along Tennessee State Route 325 (SR 325) a few miles west of the road's junction with Tennessee State Route 111 (SR 111) at Byrdstown. The park is managed by the Tennessee Department of Environment and Conservation.

== History and features ==
The 45 acre (.18 km^{2}) site includes a refurbished representation of the log cabin where Hull was born in 1871 and a museum housing a number of Hull's personal items, including a replica of his 1945 Nobel Peace Prize. In 1953, the State of Tennessee purchased the cabin from the Amonett family and placed it in the hands of the Cordell Hull Birthplace and Memorial Association. The cabin was taken apart and rebuilt in the 1950s after its purchase by the state, and placed on the National Register of Historic Places in 1972. The museum was built in the 1960s.

In the 1970s and 1980s, oversight of the Hull Birthplace shifted between Pickett State Park and Standing Stone State Park, although the staff of both were deemed lacking in the necessary background for historical interpretation. After a report by Tennessee Technological University placed the structure on its endangered places list in 1986, the State of Tennessee and Pickett County improved the site's management. The cabin was again rebuilt in 1996 in hopes of reestablishing historical accuracy that had been ignored by the previous rebuilding. In 1997, Cordell Hull Birthplace State Park was created when the state legislature approved funding for a full-time staff for the site.

=== Bunkum Cave ===
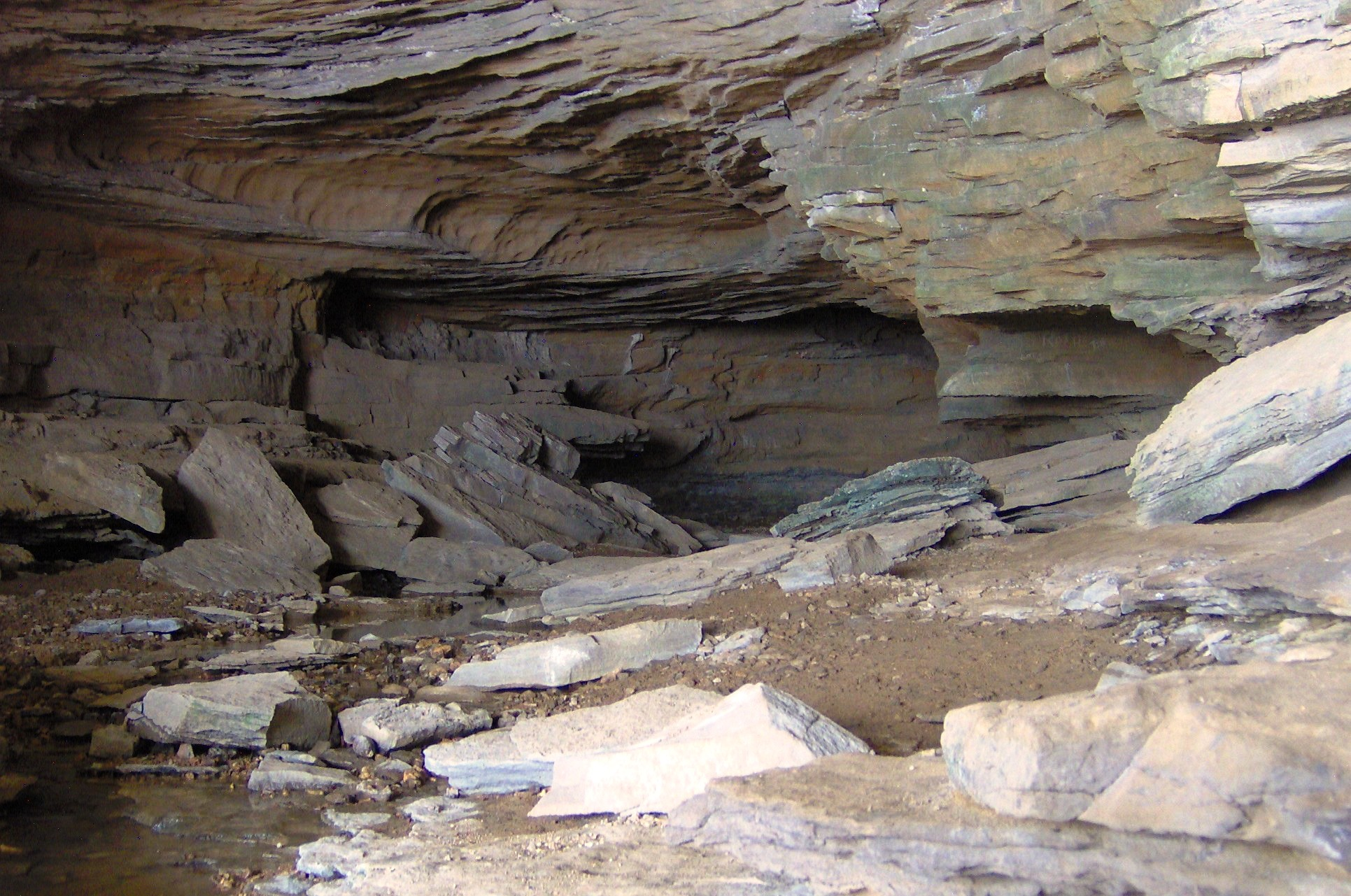
Bunkum Cave

One of many substantial caves located on the limestone-rich Highland Rim, Bunkum Cave is situated along the headwaters of Cove Creek, just south of the Cordell Hull Birthplace. The mouth of the cave is approximately 100 feet (30 m) wide and 30 feet (9.1 m) high (30m x 9m). A 1992 survey of the cave by the Tennessee Division of Archaeology found evidence that the cave had been occupied during the Middle Woodland period (c. 1000 B.C. - 1000 A.D.). William Hull, Cordell's father, used the cave to house a moonshine still. The state purchased the cave and the surrounding 29 acres (120,000 m^{2}) in 2002 as an addition to the Cordell Hull Birthplace. Shortly thereafter, a 2.5-mile (4.0 km) loop trail was constructed to allow access to the cave's entrance. At present, a permit is required to explore the cave beyond its lighted area.
