= M247 Sergeant York =

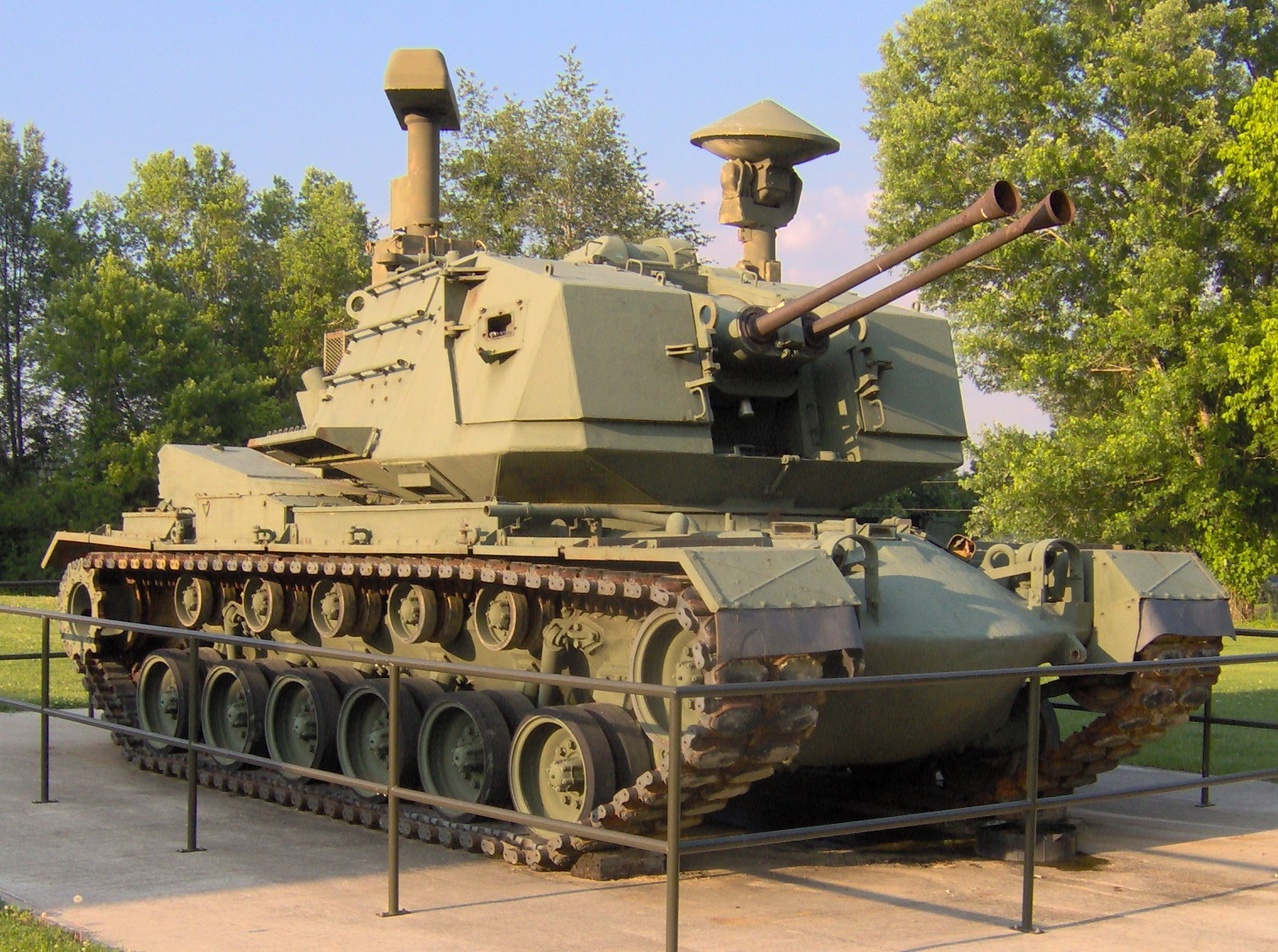
- An M247 Sergeant York on display at Sgt. Alvin C. York State Historic Park, Tennessee.
- Type: Self-propelled antiaircraft gun
- Place of origin: United States

Production history
- Designer: Ford Aerospace
- Designed: 1977–1985
- Produced: 50

Specifications
- Mass: 54.4 ton
- Length: 7.67 m (25 ft 2 in) gun forward 6.42 m (21 ft 1 in) hull only
- Width: 3.63 m
- Height: 3.42
- Crew: 3
- Shell: 0.96 kg (projectile)
- Caliber: 40 mm (1.57in)
- Elevation: −5° to +85°
- Traverse: 360°
- Rate of fire: 600 rpm
- Maximum firing range: 12.5 km
- Main armament: 2 × Bofors 40 mm L/70 (with 580 rounds)
- Engine: Continental AVDS-1790-2D diesel 750 hp
- Suspension: Torsion bar
- Operational range: 500 km (310 mi)
- Maximum speed: 48 km/h (road)

The M247 Sergeant York DIVAD (Division Air Defense) was a self-propelled anti-aircraft gun (SPAAG), developed by Ford Aerospace in the late 1970s. Based on the M48 Patton tank, it replaced the Patton's turret with a new one that featured twin radar-directed Bofors 40 mm rapid-fire guns. The vehicle was named after Sergeant Alvin York, a World War I hero.

The Sergeant York was intended to fight alongside the M1 Abrams and M2 Bradley in the U.S. Army, in a role similar to the Soviet ZSU-23-4 and German Flakpanzer Gepard. It would replace the M163A1 Vulcan Air Defense System, M42A1 Duster SPAAG and MIM-72 Chaparral missile, ad hoc systems of limited performance that had been introduced when the more advanced MIM-46 Mauler missile failed to mature.

Despite the use of many off-the-shelf technologies that were intended to allow rapid and low-cost development, a series of technical problems and massive cost overruns resulted in the cancellation of the project in 1985.

== History ==
=== Prior efforts ===
The first effective SPAAG in U.S. Army service was the all-manual M19 Multiple Gun Motor Carriage, which consisted of twin 40 mm L60 Bofors guns based on the same chassis as used for the M24 Chaffee. When the M24 and vehicles on the same chassis were retired, the turrets were taken from the M19s, modified and mounted onto the M41 Walker Bulldog light tank chassis to produce the M42 Duster. While capable for the era it was designed in, by the time it reached widespread service in the late 1950s it was clear that it was ineffective against high-speed jet-powered targets. The Duster was completely removed from service by 1963, only to be re-introduced briefly during the Vietnam War when its replacement never arrived.

The first proposed replacement for the Duster was the Sperry Vigilante, which referred to the six-barreled 37 mm Gatling gun proposed as the basis for a new SPAAG. Although the gun was extremely powerful, at some point in the late 1950s the Army decided that all gun-based systems were out of date.

The next proposed replacement for the Duster was the ambitious MIM-46 Mauler missile system. Mauler mounted a nine-missile magazine on top of an adapted M113 Armored Personnel Carrier chassis, along with detection and tracking radars. Mauler featured a completely automatic fire control system, with the operators simply selecting targets and pressing "OK". It would be able to respond to low-flying high-speed targets at any angle out to a range of about five miles. However, Mauler proved to be beyond the state-of-the-art and ran into intractable problems during development. Realizing it was not going to enter service any time soon, it was downgraded to a technology demonstration program in 1963, and eventually canceled outright in 1965.

Still lacking an effective anti-aircraft system, the Army started development of two stop-gap systems that were meant to operate in concert as the "Chaparral-Vulcan Air Defense System". The M163 VADS combined the M61 Vulcan cannon, the M113 chassis, and an all-optical fire control system with a simple lead-computing gunsight. Suitable for "snap shots" against nearby targets, the VADS system was equipped only with a small ranging radar for the gunsight, its firing range being too small to justify a larger tracking radar.

VADS was intended to operate in concert with the MIM-72 Chaparral missile system, which combined the AIM-9 Sidewinder missile with a more heavily modified version of the M113 chassis. The Chaparral's AIM-9D missiles were capable of tail-chase launches only, but offered ranges up to five miles (8.0 km). Also using an all-optical firing system, the Chaparral nevertheless required the operator to "settle" the missiles on the target for a period of time to allow them to lock on, limiting its ability to deal with quickly moving targets. Both vehicles were optionally supported by the AN/MPQ-49 Forward Area Alerting Radar (FAAR), but this system was towed by the Gama Goat and could not be used near the front lines. The pair of weapons was, at best, a nuisance to the enemy and had limited performance against modern aircraft.

At one point the Army started to become concerned about developments in sensor technologies that would allow attacks by fixed-wing aircraft at night or in bad weather. They developed a requirement for a weapon system able to operate using FLIR and a laser rangefinder in order to counter these threats. However, the rest of the military establishment disapproved of the idea; even the US Air Force was able to carry out only limited operations in bad weather, and the Soviets had a considerably less capable force in this regard. The idea gained little traction and died.

=== Pop-up problems ===
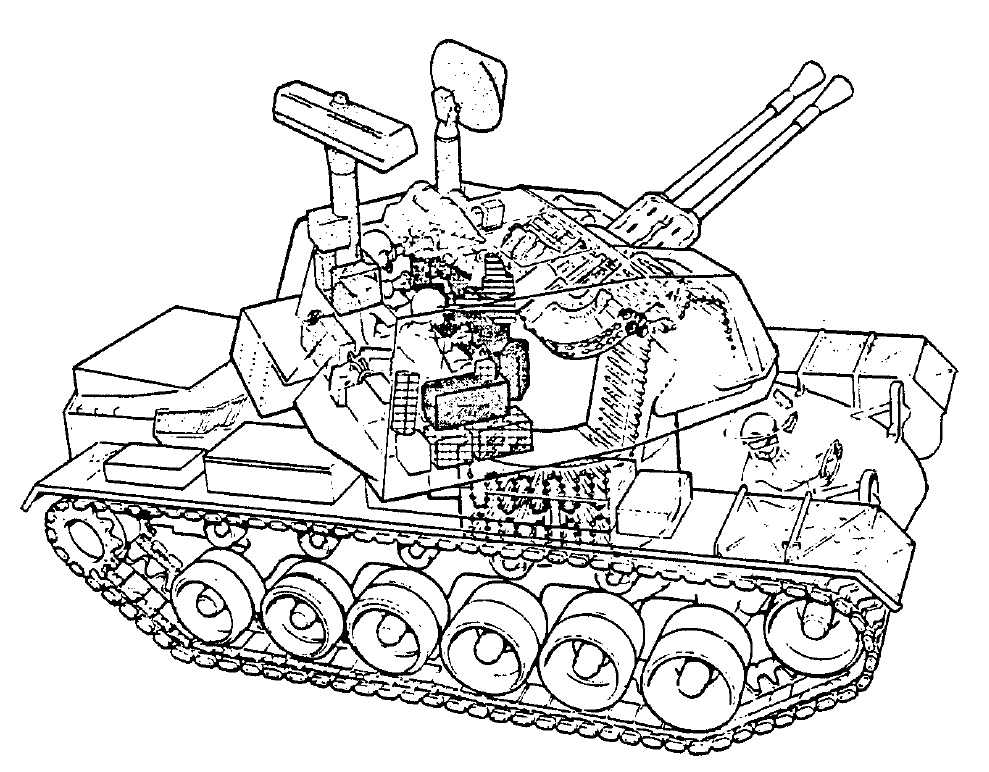
A cutaway of the M247

During the late 1960s the combination of the helicopter and anti-tank missiles improved to the point where they became a major threat to armoured operations. The U.S. led the field with their TOW missile on the UH-1 Iroquois, demonstrating this powerful combination in combat in the Vietnam War's 1972 Easter Offensive. The Soviets initially lagged behind the U.S., but with the introduction of the 9K114 Shturm missile on the Mil Mi-24 (called the "Hind" by NATO) in the 1970s the USSR achieved a level of parity.

Unlike fixed-wing aircraft, attack helicopters had the ability to loiter near the front behind cover and pick their targets. They would then "pop up", launch a missile, and return to cover as soon as the missile hit its target. Using fast-reacting wire-guided or radio-command missiles meant the total engagement time was kept to a minimum, as there was little or no "lock-on" time required; the operator simply fired as soon as they were clear of the terrain, and then adjusted the missile's flight path onto the target while it flew. Against these aircraft, the Vulcan/Chaparral combination was effectively useless.

The Vulcan could react quickly enough to the fleeting targets, but its 20 mm gun had an effective range of only about 1,200 metres (1,300 yd), far shorter than the 3,000 to 5,000 metres (3,300 to 5,500 yd) range of the 9K114. While the Chaparral had enough range to engage the "Hind", its lengthy lock-on period meant the Hind would have hit its target and hidden behind terrain again before the Sidewinder would reach it. Additionally, the older Sidewinder missiles used on the Chaparral homed in on exhaust, and had limited capability against helicopters faced head-on.

The limited effectiveness of the Vulcan/Chaparral was not the only problem the US Army was facing in the late 1970s. At the time they were also in the process of introducing the new M1 Abrams and M2 Bradley vehicles, which had dramatically improved cross-country performance. The M113-based Vulcan and Chaparral could not keep up with them on the advance, which would leave the new vehicles open to attack in a fast moving front.

Finally, the Soviets were widely introducing the ZSU-23-4 "Shilka" SPAAG, which was cause for some concern after it appeared in the Middle East. Israeli pilots attempting to avoid fire from Syrian SA-6 batteries would fly low, directly into the Shilka's envelope. Several aircraft were lost or damaged. The Shilka proved that a modern SPAAG was effective against modern aircraft.

=== DIVAD ===
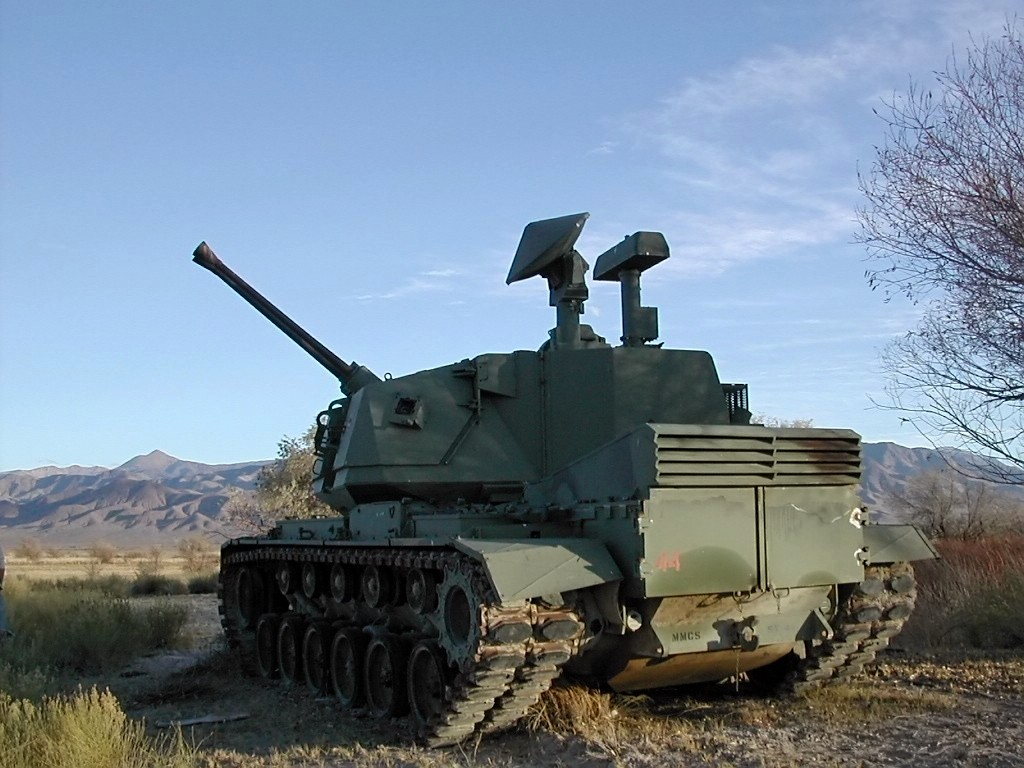
An M247 in Nevada. The twin barrels are side-on to the camera.

For all of these reasons, the Army developed the "Advanced Radar-directed Gun Air Defense System" (ARGADS) requirement for a new weapon system combining the reaction speed of the Vulcan with the range of the Chaparral, and placing them on a chassis that could keep up with the new tanks in combat. They also worked in the earlier FLIR/laser requirement. The system was later renamed "Division Air Defense" (DIVAD).

At the time, most U.S. military policy was based on the US Air Force quickly gaining air superiority and holding it throughout a conflict. In keeping with this, the Army had previously placed relatively low priority on anti-aircraft weapons. This gave them time to mature through testing and shakedowns. In the case of DIVADs the threat was considered so serious and rapidly developing that the Army decided to skip the traditional development period and try to go straight into production by using a number of "off-the-shelf" parts.

Colonel Russell Parker testified before the Senate Armed Services Committee in March 1977 that "We expect this somewhat unorthodox approach to permit a much reduced development time, thus resulting in an earliest fielding date, albeit with higher but acceptable risks... the manufacturer will be required by the fixed price warranty provisions, to correct deficiencies." It was claimed that this would cut up to five years from the development cycle, although it would require problems to be found in service and fixed on the operational vehicles.

Colonel Parker unveiled the DIVAD plan to 49 industry representatives on 18 May 1977. The DIVAD's requirement demanded that the entrants be based on the M48 Patton tank chassis, provided by the Army, which were held in large quantities in surplus depots. DIVAD called for the gun to acquire a target and start firing within five seconds (later extended to eight) of it becoming visible or coming into its 3,000 m range, and had to have a 50% chance of hitting a target with a 30-round burst. In addition to all-weather capability, it also needed to have optical aiming capabilities, including a FLIR and laser rangefinder.

=== Entrants ===
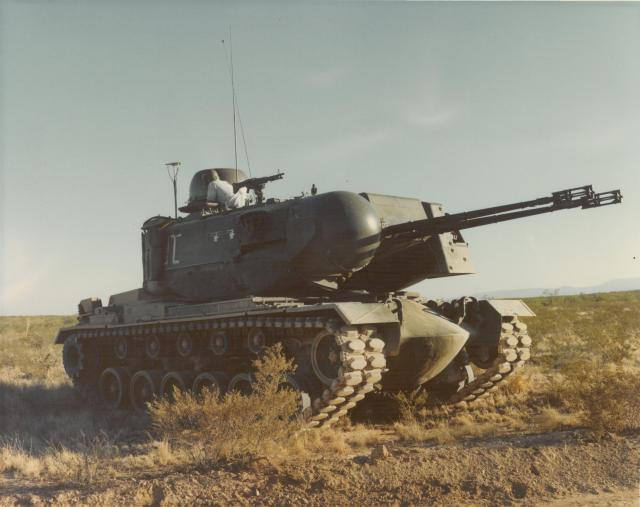
General Dynamics entered the XM246 into the DIVAD project. The large round object on the front of the turret is the targeting radar, the search radar is on top.

Several companies responded to the DIVADs contest.

Sperry Rand entered a system based on their older Vigilante gun, modified to fire the 35 mm round from the Oerlikon KDA series, widely used in NATO in the anti-aircraft role. The gun could be fired at 3,000 rounds per minute for anti-aircraft use, or 180 rounds per minute for use against ground targets, fed from a 1,464-round magazine. The aluminium turret was topped by two radars and an IFF system, all from Sperry.

General Electric entered a version with a small turret mounting their 30 mm GAU-8 Avenger cannon from the A-10 Thunderbolt II. It included a single search/track radar adapted from the earlier FAAR, although they later suggested an improved system.

Raytheon proposed using the turret from the Dutch version of the German Flakpanzer Gepard. Most of the turret remained the same as the original Gepard, including the twin 35 mm Oerlikon KDA cannons, but used Hollandse Signaalapparaten radars and an Oerlikon Contraves fire-control computer. Raytheon demonstrated that the turret, although designed for the Leopard 1, could be mounted on the M48 with some adaptation.

General Dynamics' entry also mounted twin Oerlikon KDA cannons, but mounted them side by side in a new aluminum turret, as opposed to either side of the turret as in the Gepard. They could be fired in either the automatic or semiautomatic mode, and their combined rate of fire was 1,100 rounds per minute from a 600-round magazine. The radar and fire control systems were derived from their Phalanx CIWS system, with the tracking radar mounted on the front of the turret, beside the guns, and the search radar on top. The turret also included independently stabilized optical sights and a laser range finder for manual engagements.

Ford Aerospace's entry was based around the Bofors 40 mm L/70 cannons, twin-mounted in the center of the turret in a fashion similar to the General Dynamics entry. The relatively large and boxy turret also mounted separate long-range search and short-range tracking radars on top. The radars were mounted on booms to give them a clear view of the sky, and both had the ability to be folded down to reduce the vehicle's height during travel. The tracking radar was a modified version of the Westinghouse AN/APG-66 from the F-16 Fighting Falcon. Like the General Dynamics entry, it also mounted a complete optical sighting and ranging system. The radar was a modified AN/APG-68 with an AN/APG-66 transmitter. Some critics claim that Ford's use of the 40 mm Bofors appears to have been a business decision, not a technical one. While the 35 mm round was already a widely accepted NATO standard and was technically well respected, Ford had a marketing agreement with Bofors. Journalist Gregg Easterbrook later commented on the politicized nature of the contest.

Immediately the lobbying began. Ford had a marketing agreement with ... Bofors, a maker of 40-mm but not 35-mm cannons; while Ford could have switched to a 35-mm weapon for DIVAD, the potential profits from a 40-mm weapon were higher. Department of Defense lawyers, the Army pleading to Congress, had advised that specifying the caliber ... would be 'anti-competitive' and could lead to lawsuits—'the most ludicrous excuse I've ever heard' [according to] a high-ranking Pentagon official... When the final DIVAD requirements were issued they called for a gun 'in the 30-mm to 40-mm range'.

However, the Bofors 40 mm L/70 cannon also had worldwide popularity and had become NATO standard back in the mid-1950s. In addition, FACC had developed a proximity-sensing round for the 40 mm, which increased probability of a kill, and the shell carried either a greater explosive charge or higher deadweight mass than the smaller anti-aircraft platforms. These factors would be important in the primary scenario for which the DIVAD was to be deployed, that being the large-theater land operations vs the Warsaw Pact.

=== Development ===
On 13 January 1978, General Dynamics and Ford were given development contracts for one prototype each, the XM246 and XM247 respectively, to be delivered to Fort Bliss in June 1980. On schedule, both companies delivered their prototypes to the North McGregor Test Facility and head-to-head testing began. The shoot-off was delayed for two months "because the prototypes which arrived at Fort Bliss test range were too technically immature." In the DT/OT II test series they shot down two F-86 Sabre fighters, five UH-1 Huey helicopters and twenty-one smaller drones.

After the 29-month Phase One trial, Ford's entry was selected as the winner of the DIVADs contest on 7 May 1981, and given a fixed-price $6.97 billion development and initial production contract for deliveries at various rates. The system was officially named M247 Sergeant York when the contract was awarded. The decision was controversial, as the General Dynamics entry had "outscored" the Ford design consistently in testing, nineteen "kills" to nine by most accounts.

Ford's prototype vehicle started demonstrating problems almost immediately. The main concerns had to do with the tracking radar, which demonstrated considerable problems with ground clutter. In testing, it was unable to distinguish between helicopters and trees. When the guns were pointed upward to fire on high-angle targets, the barrels projected into the radar's line of sight and further confused the system. Additionally, the reaction time was far too slow; against hovering helicopters it was 10 to 11 seconds, but against high-speed targets it was from 11 to 19, far too long to take a shot.

The RAM-D (reliability, availability, maintainability and durability) tests ran from November 1981 to February 1982, demonstrating a wide range of operation concerns. The turret proved to have too slow a traverse to track fast moving targets, and had serious problems operating in cold weather, including numerous hydraulic leaks. The simple electronic counter-countermeasures (ECCM) suite could be defeated by only minor jamming. The used guns taken from U.S. Army stock were in twisted condition due to careless warehousing. Perhaps the most surprising problem was that the 30-year-old M48 chassis with the new 20-ton turret meant the vehicle had trouble keeping pace with the newer M1 and M2, the vehicles it was meant to protect.

In February 1982 the prototype was demonstrated for a group of US and British officers at Fort Bliss, along with members of Congress and other VIPs. When the computer was activated, it immediately started aiming the guns at the review stands, causing several minor injuries as members of the group jumped for cover. Technicians worked on the problem, and the system was restarted. This time it started shooting toward the target, but fired into the ground 300 metres (980 ft) in front of the tank. In spite of several attempts to get it working properly, the vehicle never successfully engaged the sample targets. A Ford manager claimed that the problems were due to the vehicle being washed for the demonstration and fouling the electronics. In a report on the test, Easterbrook jokingly wondered if it ever rained in central Europe.

In February 1984 the Defense Department sent a "cure-notice" censuring Ford Aerospace for numerous "totally unacceptable" delays in the program. In March 1984 the Army took delivery, six months late, of the first production model for testing. One of the early models was reported to have locked onto a latrine fan, mistaking its return for a moving target of low-priority. Reporting on the incident in another article on the vehicle's woes, Washington Monthly reported that "Michael Duffy, a reporter for the industry publication Defense Week, who broke this aspect of the story, received a conference call in which Ford officials asked him to describe the target as a 'building fan' or 'exhaust fan' instead."

Nevertheless, the program's manager within the Army was cautiously positive. Major General Maloney said, "The DIVAD battery-eight systems plus one spare-activated 1 November 1984, at Fort Bliss to prepare for tests, has been demonstrating 90% reliability for full systems capability. The systems have been able to operate in a degraded manner a further 2% of the time and have had an 8% inoperable rate." He later stated that the "gun still had problems with software and electronic countermeasures, but my sensing was that it was certainly no worse than many weapon systems at this period in their gestation".

=== Cancellation ===
In spite of the bad press and development problems, the Army continued to press for the system's deployment as they had no other system in the pipeline to replace it. To add to the problems, another generation of Soviet helicopter and missile designs was pushing their envelope out to 6,000 metres (6,600 yd), rendering DIVADs ineffective at long range. In response, the Army announced it would consider adding the Stinger missile to the DIVAD system, leading to even more cries about its ineffectiveness.

As Washington became increasingly frustrated with the DIVAD's problems, Secretary of Defense Caspar Weinberger ordered a $54 million series of battlefield-condition tests. Congress authorized production money to keep the program alive through a test-fix-test cycle but with a caveat; the funds would be released only if Weinberger certified that the gun "meets or exceeds the performance specifications of its contract." The tests were monitored by the Pentagon's new Director, Operational Test and Evaluation Office (DOT&E), mandated by Congress in 1983 to serve as an independent watchdog. The tests were carried out late in 1984.

The results were abysmal. When the gun proved unable to hit drones moving even in a straight line, the tests were relaxed to hovering targets. The radar proved unable to lock even to this target, as the return was too small. The testers then started adding radar reflectors to the drone to address this "problem", eventually having to add four. Easterbrook, still covering the ongoing debacle, described this as being similar to demonstrating the abilities of a bloodhound by having it find a man standing alone in the middle of an empty parking lot, covered with steaks. The system now tracked the drone, and after firing a lengthy burst of shells the drone was knocked off target. As it flew out of control, the range safety officer had it destroyed by remote control. This was interpreted by the press as an attempt to "fake" the results, describing it as "sophomoric deceits". From that point on, every test success was written off as faked.

The OT&E concluded that the gun could perform the mission as originally specified, but the tests also showed that the system had considerable reliability problems, many as the result of trying to adapt a radar system developed for aircraft to the ground role. Initial production tests run from December 1984 to May 1985 turned up a continued variety of problems, failing 22 of 163 contract requirements, and 22 serious failures in operational readiness. Contrary to the Army's earlier reports, OT&E Director Jack Krings said the tests showed, "the SGT YORK was not operationally effective in adequately protecting friendly forces during simulated combat, even though its inherent capabilities provided improvement over the current [General Electric] Vulcan gun system. The SGT YORK was not operationally suitable because of its low availability during the tests." They measured the availability of the system at 33%, as opposed to the required 90%.

On 27 August 1985, Weinberger killed the project after about 50 vehicles had been produced. He said, "the tests demonstrated that while there are marginal improvements that can be made in the York gun, they are not worth the additional cost-so we will not invest any more funds in the system." Noting that canceling the project did not imply a lack of need, he started the process of studying a missile-based system to fill the same niche. This led to the Oerlikon Canada ADATS system, which suffered problems of its own and entered service only in the Canadian Army. The niche was eventually filled by the M6 Linebacker, an adaptation of the M2 with Stinger missiles. Although far less capable than the ADATS missile, the Linebacker is able to keep up with mobile heavy forces. The Linebacker has been retired from active service, while the M1097 Avenger HMMWV-based Stinger-equipped systems have been downsized.

Most of the production Sergeants York ended up as targets on air force bombing ranges. However, one is on display at the Sgt. Alvin C. York State Historic Park in Pall Mall, Tennessee, the hometown of its namesake; one is in the Wahner E. Brooks Historical Exhibit at the U.S. Army Yuma Proving Grounds, Arizona; one is at the AAF Museum in Danville, Virginia (now closed); one is at the Fort Snelling Military Museum in Minneapolis, Minnesota (now closed); and one is at the Arkansas National Guard Museum at Camp Robinson, North Little Rock, Arkansas.

== See also ==
- List of land vehicles of the U.S. Armed Forces

Non-NATO:

- CV9040 AAV APC that also uses a 40mm Bofors with proximity-fused ammunition
- ZSU-37-2 Yenisei Earlier Soviet equivalent that also never entered service

== References and notes ==
- Philip Trewhitt, "Armoured Fighting Vehicles", Prospero Books, 1999 (second edition?). ISBN 1-894102-81-9
