= Byrdstown, Tennessee =

- Town
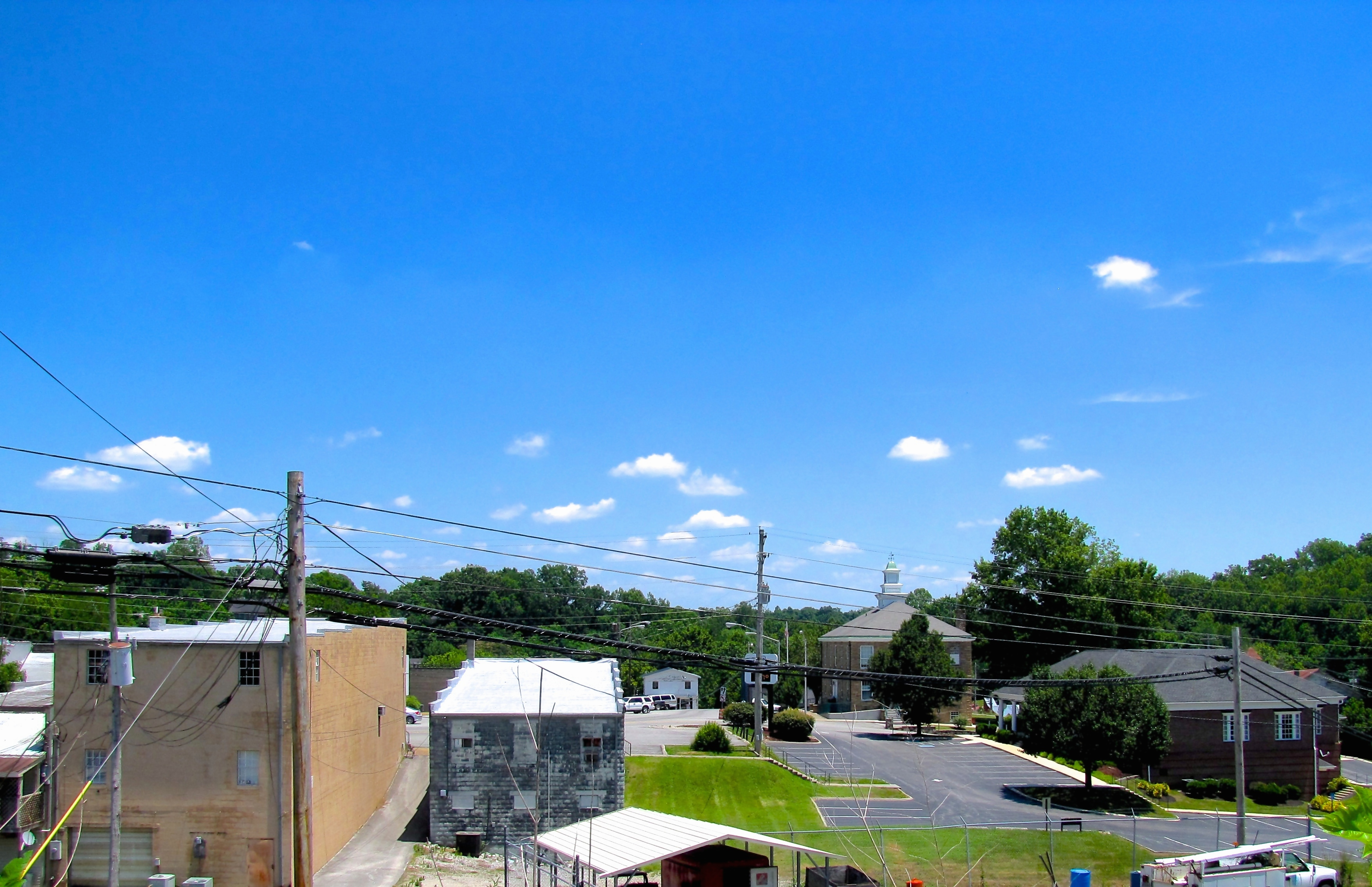
- Town square in Byrdstown

- Flag Logo

- Location of Byrdstown in Pickett County, Tennessee.
- Coordinates: 36°34′N 85°8′W
- Country: United States
- State: Tennessee
- County: Pickett
- Founded: 1879
- Incorporated: 1917
- Named for: Col. Robert K. Byrd

Area
  - Total: 1.49 sq mi (3.85 km^{2})
  - Land: 1.49 sq mi (3.85 km^{2})
  - Water: 0 sq mi (0.00 km^{2})
- Elevation: 1,037 ft (316 m)

Population (2020)
  - Total: 798
  - Density: 536/sq mi (207.1/km^{2})
- Time zone: UTC-6 (Central (CST))
  - Summer (DST): UTC-5 (CDT)
- ZIP code: 38549
- Area code: 931
- FIPS code: 47-10180
- GNIS feature ID: 1279260
- Website: www.townofbyrdstown.com

Byrdstown is a town in Pickett County, Tennessee, United States. The population was 798 at the 2020 census. It is the county seat of Pickett County.

== History ==
Byrdstown was established in 1879 as a county seat for the newly formed Pickett County. The town, where several families already lived, was named for Colonel Robert K. Byrd, a state senator whose district included the new county. Byrdstown was officially incorporated in 1917.

Former Secretary of State Cordell Hull (1871–1955)— who played a pivotal role in the creation of the United Nations— was born just west of Byrdstown. The Pickett County Courthouse, built in 1935, and the Cordell Hull Birthplace are both listed on the National Register of Historic Places. Other historical sites include the Amonett House at the junction of TN-325 and TN-111.

== Geography ==
Byrdstown is located at 36°34′21″N 85°8′14″W (36.572585, -85.137088). The town is situated in a hilly area on the Highland Rim, a few miles south of the Kentucky state line. Byrdstown lies south of the Wolf River, north of the Obey River, and east of Dale Hollow Lake, where the two rivers converge.

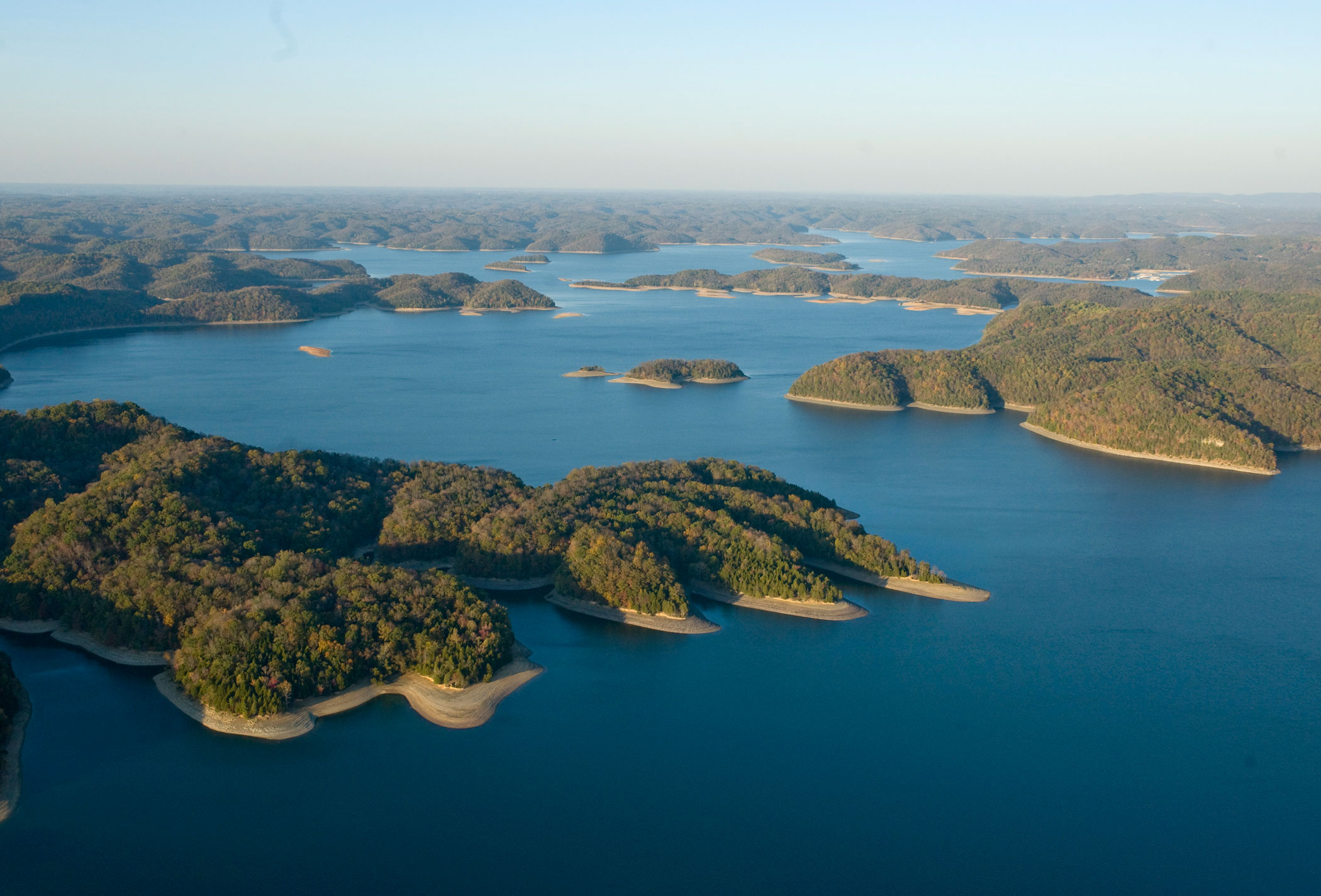
Dale Hollow Lake near Byrdstown

Tennessee State Route 325 traverses Byrdstown from west to east, mostly following West Main Street and East Main Street. This highway connects Byrdstown with the Dale Hollow Lake and Cordell Hull Birthplace State Park areas to the west, and the rural parts of central Pickett County to the east. Tennessee State Route 111, which intersects SR 325 in western Byrdstown, connects the town with Livingston to the southwest, and Static at the state line to the north. At Static, the highway terminates at an intersection with U.S. Route 127, with the latter continuing northward to Albany, Kentucky.

According to the United States Census Bureau, the town has a total area of 1.5 square miles (3.9 km^{2}), all of it land.

=== Climate ===
Climate data for Byrdstown, Tennessee, 1991–2020 normals, extremes 1998–present
Month	Jan	Feb	Mar	Apr	May	Jun	Jul	Aug	Sep	Oct	Nov	Dec	Year
Record high °F (°C)	77 (25)	79 (26)	87 (31)	90 (32)	91 (33)	100 (38)	101 (38)	100 (38)	96 (36)	96 (36)	84 (29)	81 (27)	101 (38)
Mean maximum °F (°C)	66.7 (19.3)	71.6 (22.0)	79.3 (26.3)	85.3 (29.6)	86.7 (30.4)	90.3 (32.4)	91.0 (32.8)	90.7 (32.6)	89.9 (32.2)	85.6 (29.8)	76.3 (24.6)	70.3 (21.3)	93.2 (34.0)
Mean daily maximum °F (°C)	45.7 (7.6)	50.2 (10.1)	59.1 (15.1)	69.6 (20.9)	75.6 (24.2)	82.1 (27.8)	84.5 (29.2)	84.4 (29.1)	79.7 (26.5)	70.3 (21.3)	59.1 (15.1)	49.2 (9.6)	67.5 (19.7)
Daily mean °F (°C)	36.2 (2.3)	39.7 (4.3)	47.7 (8.7)	56.9 (13.8)	65.0 (18.3)	72.4 (22.4)	75.6 (24.2)	74.4 (23.6)	68.5 (20.3)	57.9 (14.4)	47.3 (8.5)	39.8 (4.3)	56.8 (13.8)
Mean daily minimum °F (°C)	26.7 (−2.9)	29.2 (−1.6)	36.2 (2.3)	44.2 (6.8)	54.3 (12.4)	62.6 (17.0)	66.6 (19.2)	64.4 (18.0)	57.3 (14.1)	45.4 (7.4)	35.5 (1.9)	30.3 (−0.9)	46.1 (7.8)
Mean minimum °F (°C)	7.1 (−13.8)	12.1 (−11.1)	20.0 (−6.7)	28.4 (−2.0)	38.3 (3.5)	51.7 (10.9)	56.3 (13.5)	55.4 (13.0)	45.5 (7.5)	30.7 (−0.7)	20.5 (−6.4)	16.2 (−8.8)	5.5 (−14.7)
Record low °F (°C)	−9 (−23)	−6 (−21)	8 (−13)	19 (−7)	32 (0)	43 (6)	51 (11)	49 (9)	35 (2)	24 (−4)	13 (−11)	−3 (−19)	−9 (−23)
Average precipitation inches (mm)	4.52 (115)	4.96 (126)	5.01 (127)	5.19 (132)	4.90 (124)	4.74 (120)	5.28 (134)	4.09 (104)	3.62 (92)	3.27 (83)	3.68 (93)	5.32 (135)	54.58 (1,385)
Average precipitation days (≥ 0.01 in)	13.7	13.1	13.6	12.3	12.2	11.4	11.8	10.3	8.1	9.8	10.3	13.5	140.1
Source 1: NOAA
Source 2: National Weather Service (mean maxima/minima 2006–2020)

== Demographics ==
Historical population
Census	Pop.	Note	%±
1920	125		—
1930	135		8.0%
1940	215		59.3%
1950	379		76.3%
1960	613		61.7%
1970	582		−5.1%
1980	884		51.9%
1990	998		12.9%
2000	903		−9.5%
2010	803		−11.1%
2020	798		−0.6%

=== 2020 census ===
Byrdstown racial composition
Race	Number	Percentage
White (non-Hispanic)	730	91.48%
Black or African American (non-Hispanic)	1	0.13%
Asian	2	0.25%
Other/Mixed	28	3.51%
Hispanic or Latino	37	4.64%

As of the 2020 United States census, there were 798 people, 409 households, and 246 families residing in the town.

=== 2000 census ===
As of the census of 2000, there were 903 people, 395 households, and 233 families residing in the town. The population density was 587.5 inhabitants per square mile (226.8/km^{2}). There were 460 housing units at an average density of 299.3 per square mile (115.6/km^{2}). The racial makeup of the town was 98.12% White, 0.22% African American, 0.44% Native American, and 1.22% from two or more races. Hispanic or Latino of any race were 0.55% of the population.

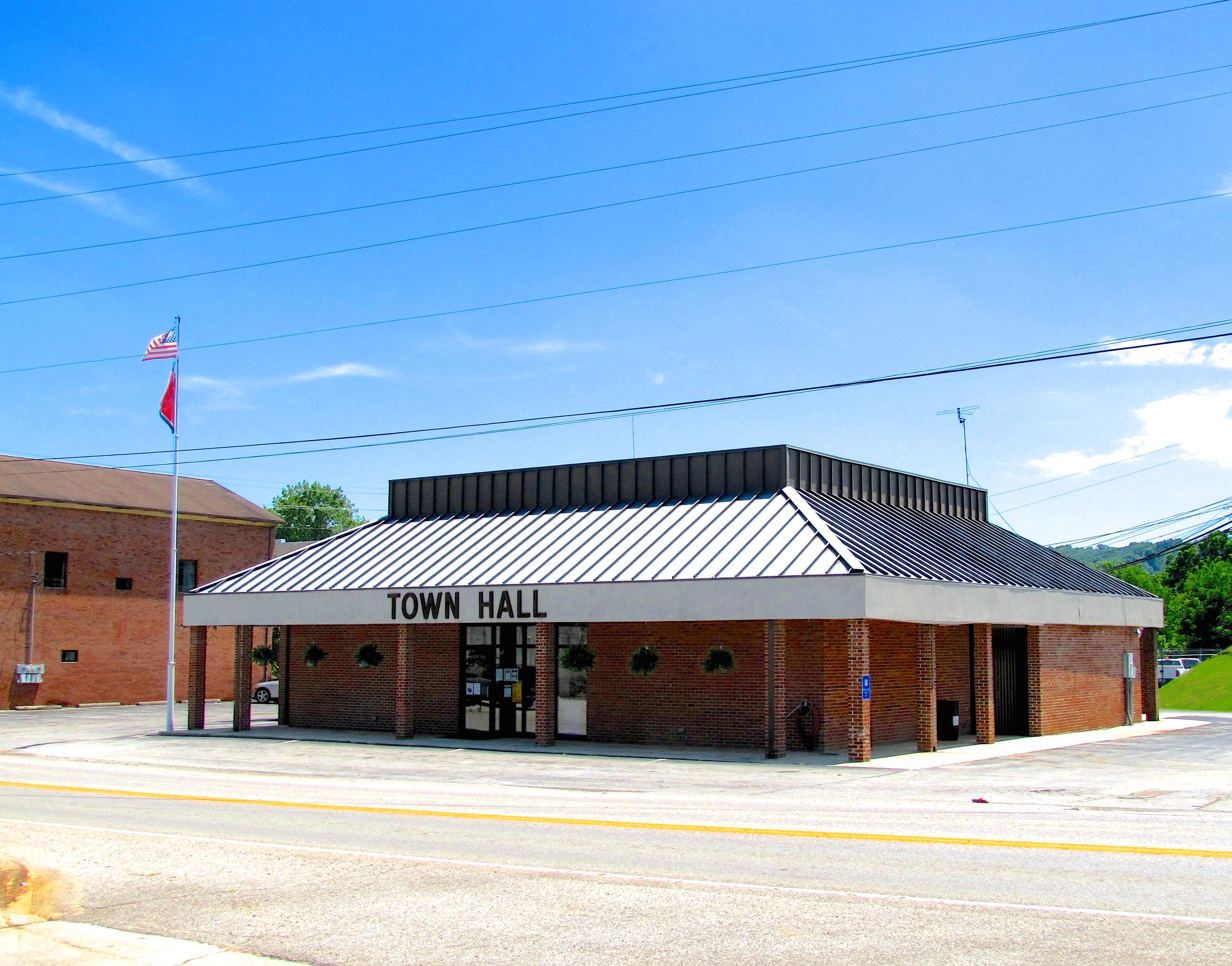
Byrdstown Town Hall

There were 395 households, out of which 24.1% had children under the age of 18 living with them, 39.7% were married couples living together, 14.9% had a female householder with no husband present, and 41.0% were non-families. 37.7% of all households were made up of individuals, and 18.7% had someone living alone who was 65 years of age or older. The average household size was 2.11 and the average family size was 2.80.

In the town, the population was spread out, with 19.8% under the age of 18, 9.7% from 18 to 24, 22.4% from 25 to 44, 23.9% from 45 to 64, and 24.1% who were 65 years of age or older. The median age was 43 years. For every 100 females, there were 81.0 males. For every 100 females age 18 and over, there were 75.7 males.

The median income for a household in the town was $19,375, and the median income for a family was $25,938. Males had a median income of $23,281 versus $16,389 for females. The per capita income for the town was $14,462. About 19.2% of families and 28.1% of the population were below the poverty line, including 40.4% of those under age 18 and 32.5% of those age 65 or over.

== Notable residents ==
- Cordell Hull (1871–1955), U.S. Secretary of State and Nobel Peace Prize winner
- Sierra Hull (b. 1991), musician
