= U.S. Route 127 =

Highway in the United States

U.S. Route 127
- US 127 highlighted in red

Route information
- Auxiliary route of US 27
- Length: 758 mi (1,220 km)
- Existed: 1926–present

Major junctions
- South end: US 27 at Chattanooga, TN
- I-40 at Crossville, TN; I-64 at Frankfort, KY; I-71 near Glencoe, KY; I-71 / I-75 at Cincinnati, OH; I-70 near Eaton, OH; US 30 at Van Wert, OH; US 20 at Fayette, OH; I-94 at Jackson, MI; I-69 / I-96 / I-496 at Lansing, MI; US 10 at Clare, MI
- North end: I-75 near Grayling, MI

Location
- Country: United States
- States: Tennessee, Kentucky, Ohio, Michigan

Highway system
- United States Numbered Highway System; List; Special; Divided

U.S. Route 127 (US 127) is a 758-mile-long (1,220 km) north–south U.S. Highway in the eastern half of the United States. The southern terminus of the route is at US 27 in Chattanooga, Tennessee. The northern terminus is at Interstate 75 (I-75) near Grayling, Michigan. Since 1987, it has been the core of the annual World's Longest Yard Sale, also known as the Highway 127 Corridor Sale (127 Yard Sale), which now stretches 690 miles (1,110 km) from Addison, Michigan, to Gadsden, Alabama. The sale, held every August, was started to demonstrate that the older U.S. Highway System has something to offer that the Interstate Highway System does not. In Michigan, US 127 tripled in length in 2002, taking mileage from its parent, US 27.

== Route description ==
Lengths
	mi	km
TN	130	210
KY	208	335
OH	194	312
MI	212	341
Total	744	1,197

=== Tennessee ===
In Tennessee, US 127 traverses rural areas of the Cumberland Plateau in eastern Middle Tennessee and western East Tennessee. The route officially begins in the northern Chattanooga suburb of Red Bank at an interchange with US 27, where it overlaps Tennessee State Route 8. From there it runs primarily northwest as it passes Signal Mountain, and later Walden Ridge before entering Dunlap, where it turns northeast along Tennessee State Route 28. After TN 8 leaves at the interchange with TN 111, US 127/TN 28 follows through the Sequatchie Valley, passing through the city of Pikeville, then curves back to the northwest as it enters Crossville, only to return towards the northeast as it enters Jamestown. From that point on it returns towards the northwest one more time as it winds through the woods surrounding the Sgt. Alvin C. York State Historic Park. Finally in Static, the road runs along the Tennessee-Kentucky border where it makes a sharp turn at the northern terminus of TN 111 before entering Kentucky.

=== Kentucky ===
In Kentucky, US 127 is cosigned with US 42 through Cincinnati's Northern Kentucky suburbs until five miles (8.0 km) east of Warsaw, then passes south through Owenton. This was the road driven by Buddy Rich when he wrote "Blue Grass makes me Blue" in 1947. At the state capital of Frankfort, it becomes a four-lane highway, then skirts Lawrenceburg, Harrodsburg, and Danville. It enters the hilly Knobs Region at Junction City, where it becomes a two-lane route, and continues through Hustonville, crossing the drainage divide between the Kentucky and Green river watersheds and roughly following the scenic upper Green River valley through Casey County, crossing the river at Liberty. South of Dunnville it climbs onto the Eastern Pennyroyal Plateau and cuts through Russell Springs and Jamestown. It crosses Wolf Creek Dam, which creates Lake Cumberland. It runs very briefly with KY 90 north of Albany and crosses into Tennessee at Static. The new route through Clinton County includes a bypass west of Albany; the original plan for a more direct eastern route was abandoned because of historic and scenic concerns. In the county US 127 runs through sinkhole plains along the escarpment that marks the western edge of the Cumberland Plateau, creating scenic views.

=== Ohio ===
US 127 serves several cities and rural communities along the extreme western edge of Ohio, including Cincinnati, New Miami, Seven Mile, Somerville, Camden, Eaton, Greenville, Celina, Van Wert, Paulding and Bryan. In Cincinnati, it shares a short concurrency with its parent route, US 27, along with US 42. From there, it heads north through Fairfield and Hamilton. The highway is a four-lane, divided bypass around Greenville. US 127 crosses the Ohio Turnpike near West Unity, but does not intersect with it. It also joins with US 36 for about 5 miles (8 km). The first city US 127 enters after leaving Kentucky is Cincinnati. The last municipality that US 127 goes through before reaching Michigan is West Unity.

Except for Defiance County, US 127 passes through the county seats of all nine counties in Ohio that share a border with Indiana. It also traverses a portion of Fulton County before entering Michigan.

In total, US 127 traverses 194.2 miles (312.5 km) across Ohio.

=== Michigan ===
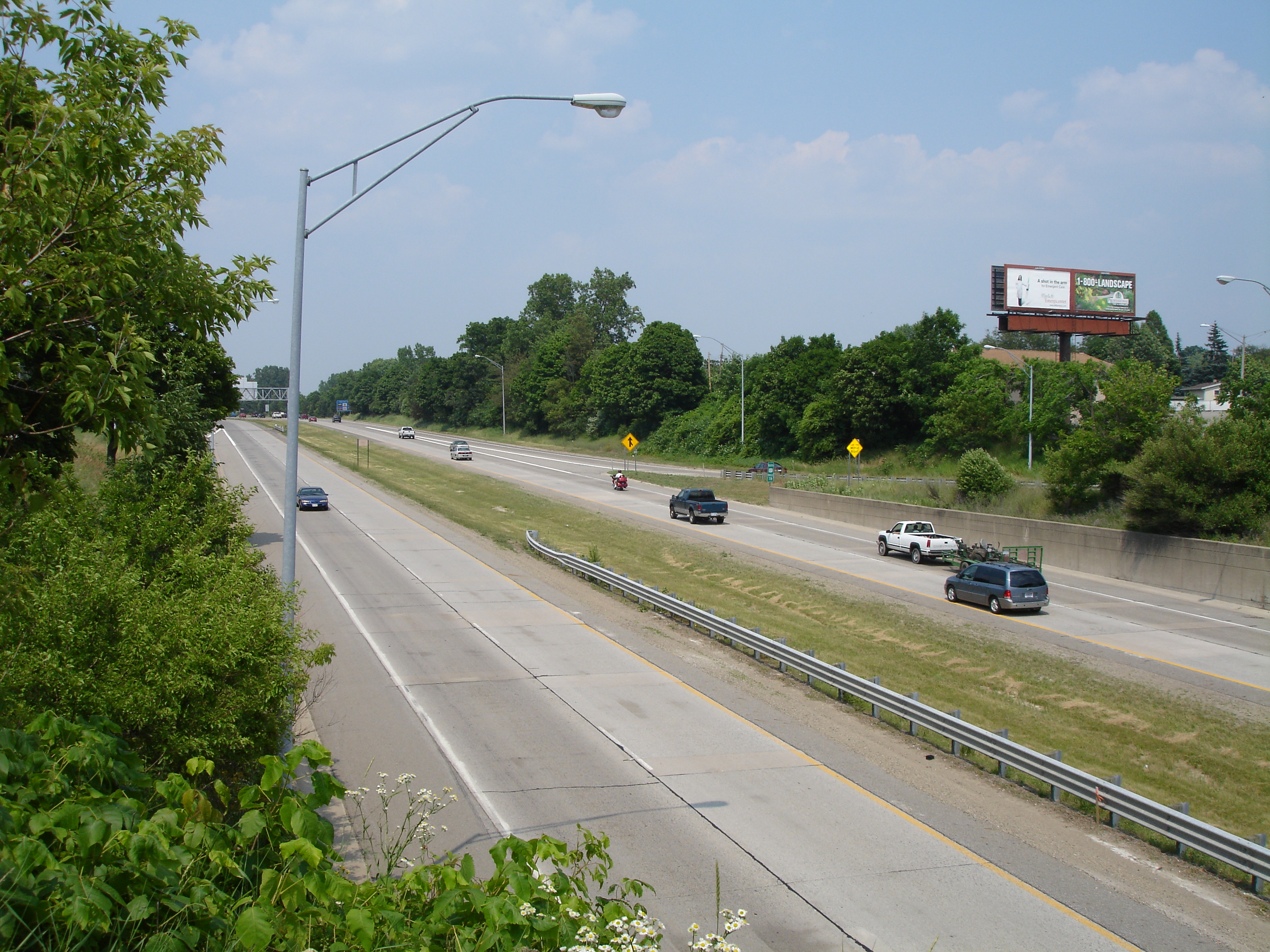
US 127 through Lansing, Michigan. Much of the route is a four-lane freeway through this state.

In Michigan, US 127 runs from the Ohio border south of Hudson north to the junction with I-75, four miles (6.4 km) south of Grayling, a distance of 212.12 miles (341.37 km).

The highway is the primary route connecting Lansing and central Michigan to Northern Michigan and the Mackinac Bridge; it serves the cities of Jackson, Lansing, and Clare. From the south side of Jackson northerly, it is mostly a four-lane freeway, except for the notable exception of a 16-mile (26 km) stretch from north of St. Johns to just south of Ithaca, where access to the road is not limited.

Prior to 2002, US 127 ran from I-69 north of East Lansing southerly to the Ohio border near Hudson, a total of 83 miles (134 km). From the Ohio border until Jackson, the highway follows the course (with minor deviations) of the Michigan Meridian used to survey Michigan in the early 19th century. That stretch is generally named Meridian Road. In the non-freeway sections of the route, it is known as Bagley Road.

A proposed I-73 would incorporate US 127 between Jackson and Grayling. However, Michigan abandoned plans for building I-73 in 2001.

== History ==
=== Southern terminus ===
US 127 originally terminated at Toledo when it was commissioned in 1926. At that time, the southern portion ran from Somerset to Toledo along the route of present-day U.S. Route 223. In 1930 the southern terminus moved to Cincinnati, and in 1958 it was extended to its present southern terminus at Chattanooga.

=== Northern terminus ===
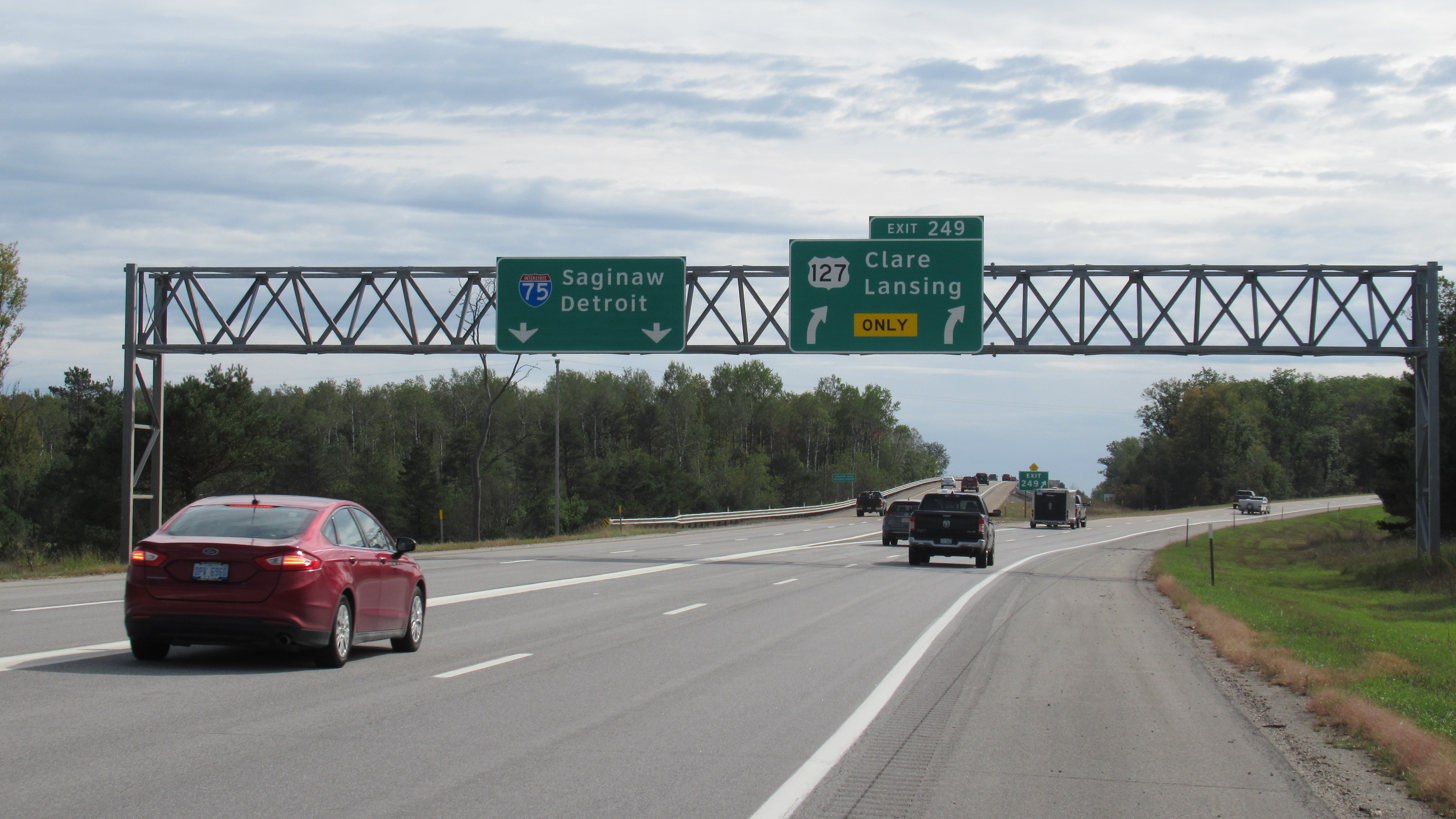
Southbound I-75 at the northern terminus of US 127 near Grayling, Michigan

The northern terminus of US 127 was in or near Lansing, Michigan, from its inception in 1926 to 2002. In 2002, the terminus was moved to an intersection with I-75 south of Grayling in Crawford County, Michigan, replacing all of US 27 north of Lansing.

== Yard sale ==
The 127 Corridor Sale, established in 1987, is named for U.S. Route 127.

== Major intersections ==
Tennessee
US 27 in Chattanooga
US 70 in Crossville
US 70N in Crossville
I-40 in Crossville
Kentucky
US 150 in Danville. The highways travel concurrently through Danville.
US 68 northeast of Harrodsburg
US 62 in Lawrenceburg
I-64 in Frankfort
US 60 in Frankfort
US 421 in Frankfort. The highways travel concurrently through Frankfort.
I-71 in Glencoe
US 42 north-northeast of Glencoe. The highways travel concurrently to .
I-71 / I-75 in Florence
US 25 in Florence. The highways travel concurrently to the Ohio state line.
I-275 in Crestview Hills
I-71 / I-75 in Fort Mitchell
I-71 / I-75 in Covington
Ohio
US 27 / US 52 in Cincinnati. The highways travel concurrently through Cincinnati.
I-75 / US 50 in Cincinnati
I-75 / US 50 in Cincinnati
US 22 in Cincinnati
I-74 in Cincinnati
I-75 in Cincinnati
I-275 on the Pleasant Run–Mount Healthy Heights–Forest Park line.
US 35 in Eaton
I-70 exit 10 Eaton, OH (4 miles south)
US 40 west of Lewisburg
US 36 west-northwest of Jaysville. The highways travel concurrently to Greenville.
US 33 southeast of Rockford
US 30 / US 224 in Van Wert. US 127/US 224 travels concurrently to north-northeast of Van Wert.
US 24 east of Cecil
US 6 south of Bryan
US 20 east of Alvordton. The highways travel concurrently to west of Fayette.
Michigan
US 223 southeast of Somerset
US 12 east of Somerset
I-94 northeast of Jackson. The highways travel concurrently to north-northwest of Jackson.
I-96 / I-496 at Michigan State University south-southeast of Lansing. I-496/US 127 travels concurrently to East Lansing.
I-69 north-northwest of East Lansing
US 10 in Clare. The highways travel concurrently to north-northwest of Clare.
I-75 south of Grayling

== See also ==
Browse numbered routes
← KY 126	list	→ KY 128
