= Sgt. Alvin C. York State Historic Park =

State park in Pall Mall, Tennessee

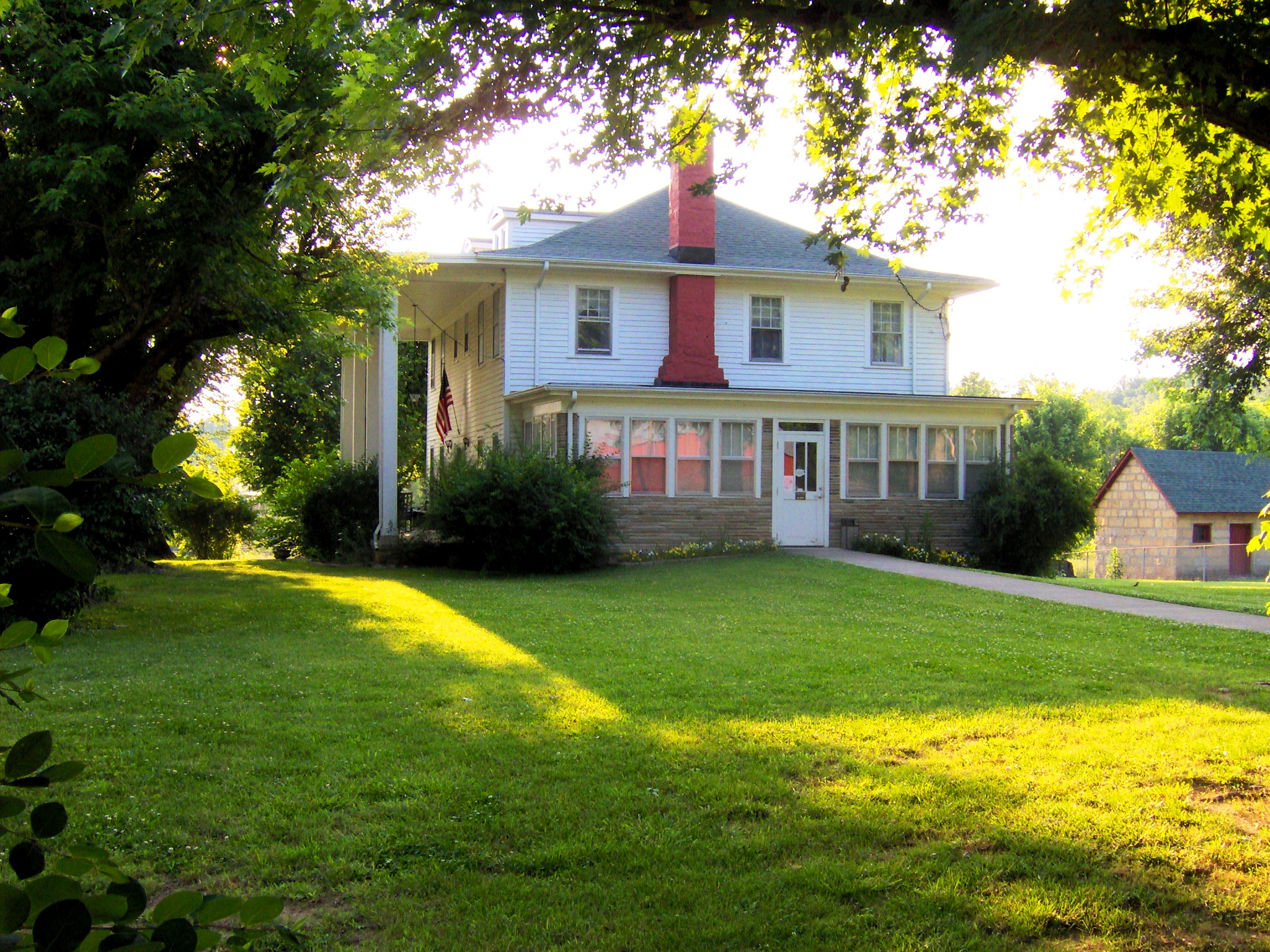
- Sgt. York house
- Interactive map of Sgt. Alvin C. York State Historic Park
- Type: Tennessee State Park
- Location: Pall Mall, Tennessee
- Created: 1967
- Open: Year round
- Website: Sgt. Alvin C. York State Historic Park
- Alvin Cullom York Farm
- U.S. National Register of Historic Places
- U.S. National Historic Landmark District
- U.S. Historic district – Contributing property
- Location within Tennessee Location within the United States
- Nearest city: Pall Mall, Tennessee
- Coordinates: 36°32′32″N 84°57′37″W
- Built: 1922
- Architect: Alvin C. York
- Part of: Sergeant York Historic Area (ID73001763)
- NRHP reference No.: 76001773

Significant dates
- Added to NRHP: May 11, 1976
- Designated NHLD: May 11, 1976
- Designated CP: April 11, 1973

Sgt. Alvin C. York State Historic Park is a state park in Pall Mall, in the U.S. state of Tennessee. Situated along the Wolf River, the park contains the farm and gristmill once owned by decorated World War I soldier Alvin C. York (1887–1964), who lived in the Pall Mall area for his entire life. Along with the millhouse and milldam, the park includes York's two-story house, York's general store and post office, the Wolf River Cemetery (where York and his family are buried), the Wolf River Methodist Church, the York Bible Institute, and various picnic facilities.

Alvin York is one of the most celebrated soldiers in American history. He joined the pacifist Church of Christ in Christian Union in 1915, and when drafted for service in World War I in 1917, he applied for conscientious objector status, but was denied. On October 8, 1918, while on patrol along the Meuse-Argonne Front in France, York and his platoon wandered behind enemy lines and were caught in an ambush that left over half the platoon dead. York then led the handful of survivors in a counterattack that resulted in the capture of 132 German soldiers.

York was awarded the Medal of Honor and became an instant celebrity, and upon his return to the United States he was barraged with offers for endorsements (both commercial and political), movies, and books, most of which he initially rejected, believing it was wrong to profit from an act of war. The Nashville Rotary Club raised the funds to buy York his Pall Mall farm, which it presented to York in 1922. After York's death in 1964, his widow donated the farm to the state of Tennessee.

== Location ==
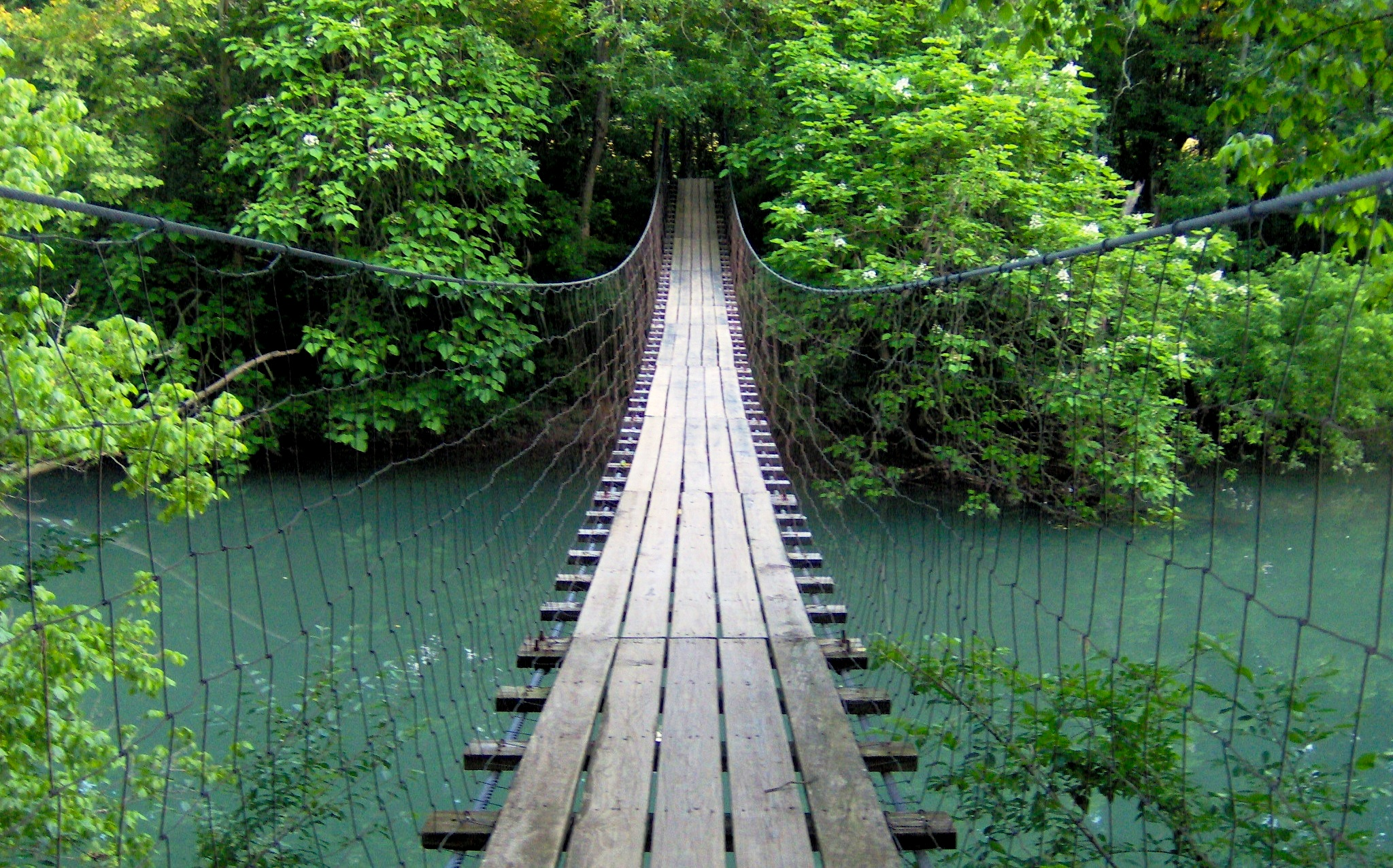
Swing bridge over the Wolf River, part of the park's walking trail

The community of Pall Mall is situated in a rugged valley carved by the Wolf River, which rises at the base of the Cumberland Plateau a few miles to the east and flows westward through the community. The York farm is located in a relatively broad stretch of the valley along a bend in the river just downstream from the river's confluence with Rotten Fork. U.S. Route 127 (York Highway) is the only major road in the area, connecting Pall Mall to Jamestown, about 10 miles (16 km) to the south, and Byrdstown, about 15 miles (24 km) to the northwest.

The York house, mill, and post office are located along US-127. The Wolf River Cemetery, Wolf River Methodist Church, and the York Bible Institute are located along Wolf River Loop, a paved road that intersects US-127 about a mile south of the York house. The two sections are connected by a 0.6-mile (0.97 km) hiking trail.

== History ==
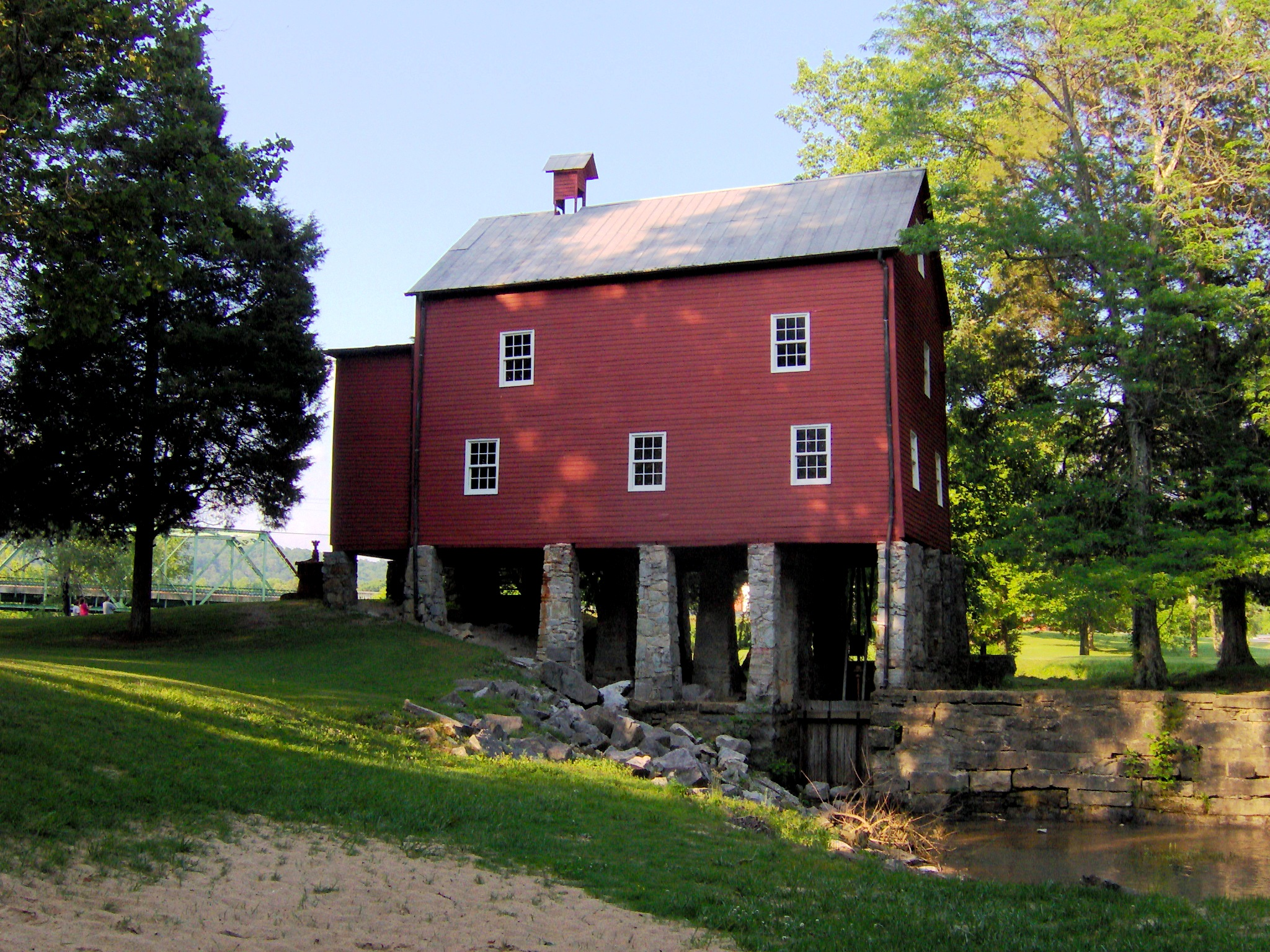
York Mill

Conrad "Old Coonrod" Pile (1766–1849), a great-great-grandfather of York, arrived in the upper Wolf River area around 1800 and gradually accumulated over a thousand acres (4 km^{2}) in the valley, including what is now Sgt. Alvin C. York State Historic Park. In the 1820s, John Clemens (1798–1847), the father of author Mark Twain, moved to the area, and was elected county court clerk with Pile's help.

Clemens departed for Missouri about three months before his famous son was born (a cabin believed to have belonged to Clemens, once located in nearby Possum Trot, is now on display at the Museum of Appalachia in Norris, Tennessee). York's maternal grandfather, a Union Army veteran named William Brooks, arrived in Pall Mall at the end of the U.S. Civil War and married Conrad Pile's granddaughter, Nancy. Not long after their daughter Mary was born, however, Brooks was murdered by a mob in Jamestown after having murdered a Pile family rival named Preston Huff.

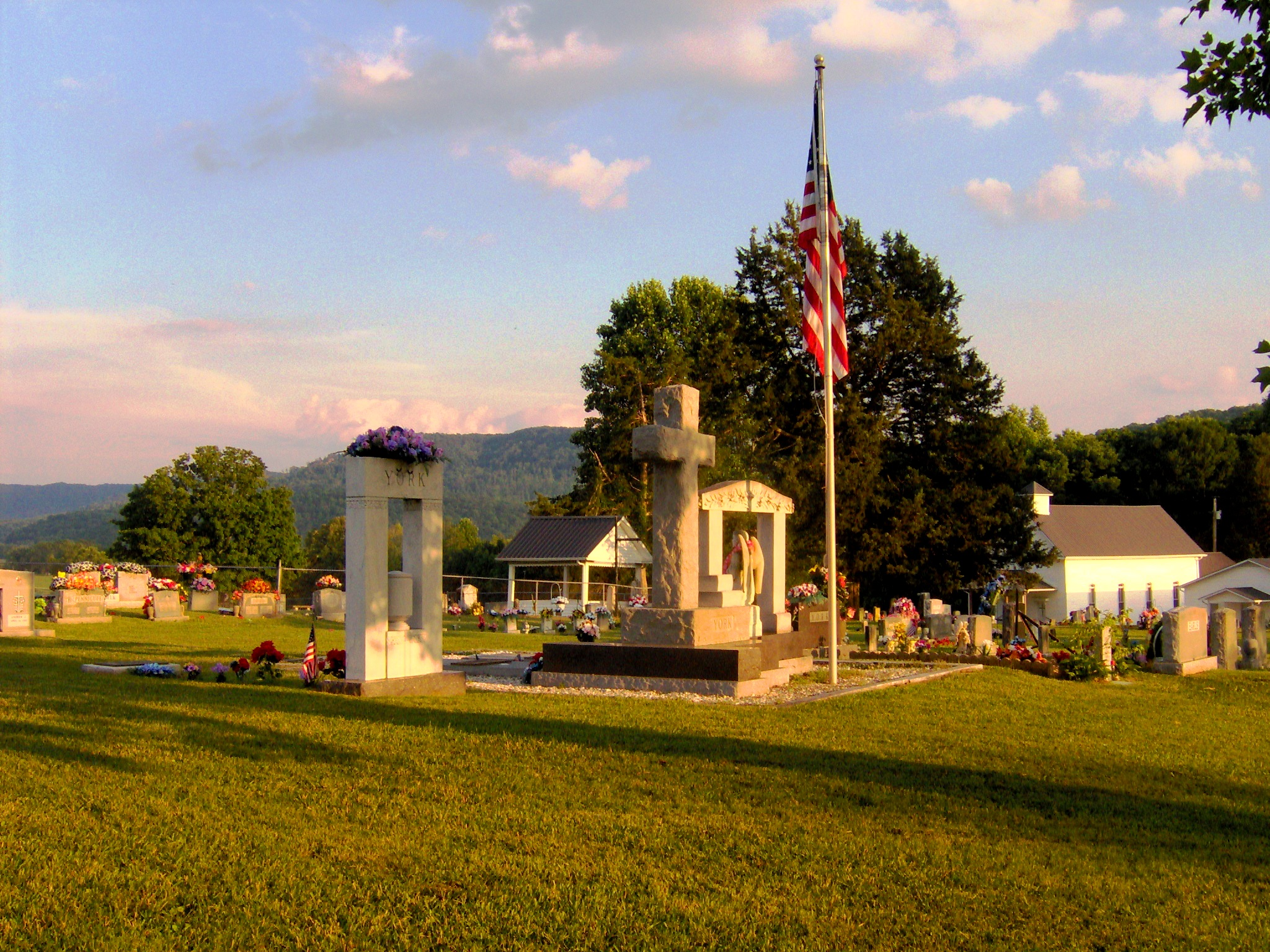
York's grave at Wolf River Cemetery

By the early 1900s, what is now the York farm had come into the hands of the Wright family. In June 1919, after his triumphant homecoming, York married Gracie Williams in a massive ceremony conducted at Pall Mall by Tennessee Governor A.H. Roberts. The Rotary Club of Nashville offered to raise the money to buy the newlyweds a new home, one of the few early gift offers York accepted, although he insisted the home be in Pall Mall.

In November 1919, the Rotary Club purchased the 400-acre (160 ha) Wright farm— which contained some of the most prized farmland in the Wolf River valley— by writing several promissory notes. The club also funded the construction of a new two-story house at the point where the main road in the community crossed the Wolf River. The Yorks moved into the house on Valentine's Day, 1922, and the Rotary Club paid off the promissory notes and transferred the land to York on May 18 of that year.

In 1925, York opened a general store across the street from his house, and in 1943 he purchased the two-story gristmill along banks of the Wolf immediately downstream from his farm. After his death, his wife, Gracie, sold the York Mill to the state of Tennessee for $10,000. The mill was transferred to the Tennessee Department of Conservation in October 1967 and initially placed under the control of Pickett State Park. Gracie York subsequently sold most of the York farm to the state for $180,000 (she rejected much higher offers from commercial interests), although she retained the rights to the house and a small plot of land until her death in 1984.

The York farm and mill were added to the U.S. National Register of Historic Places as part of the larger Sergeant York Historic Area in 1973. The York farm was designated a National Historic Landmark on May 11, 1976.

== Historical structures and other attractions ==
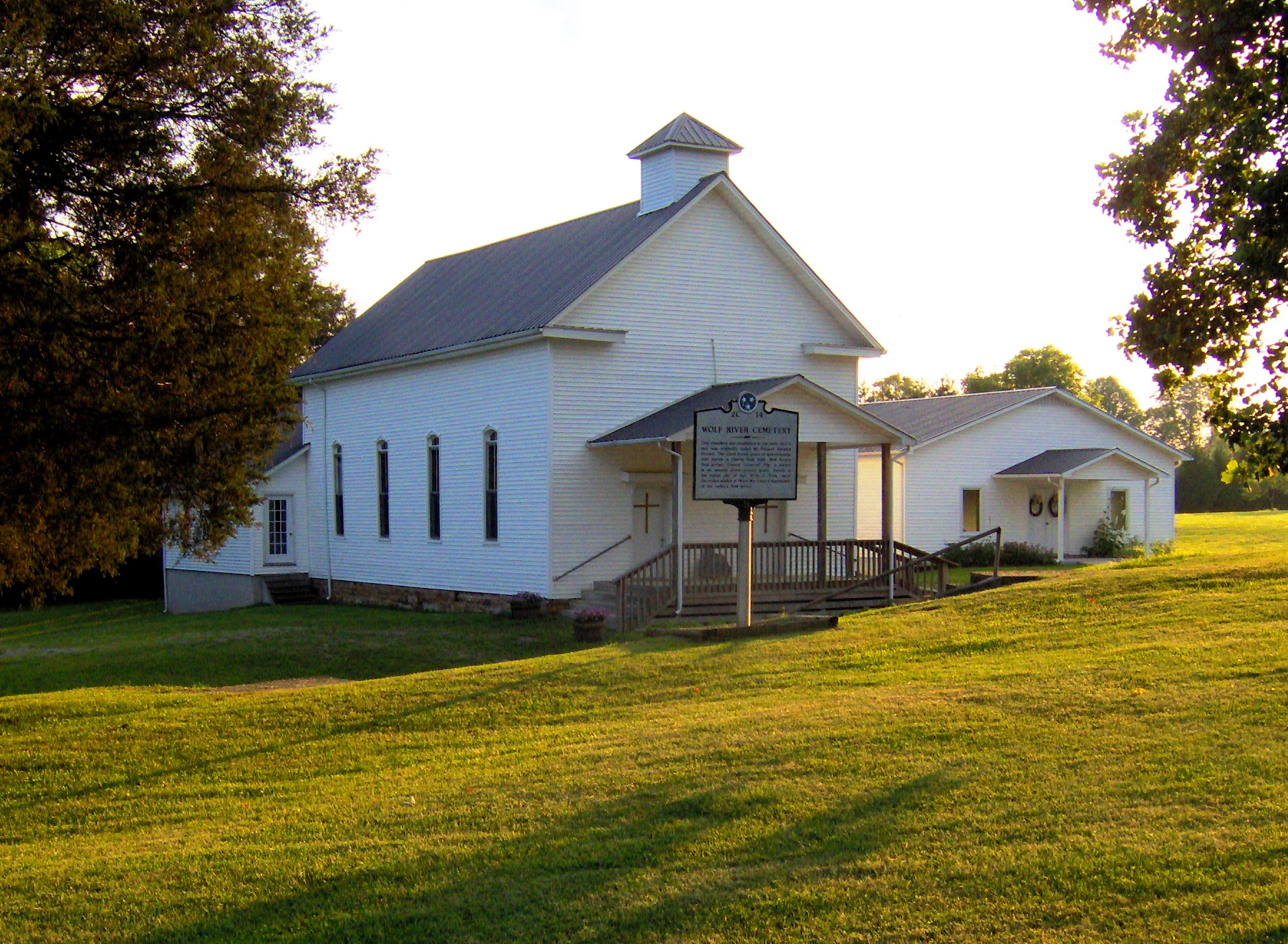
Wolf River Methodist Church

- The York house, a 2.5-story Colonial Revival-style house built in 1922. The house is 40 feet (12 m) by 31 feet (9.4 m) with corbeled chimneys at each end. The front porch is graced by a square-columned facade. The first floor, now a museum, originally contained a living room, sunroom, dining room, library, and kitchen. There were five bedrooms on the second floor. Notable outbuildings include a barn with two cylindrical stone silos.
- The York Mill, located at a bend in the Wolf River just downstream (and across the street) from the York house. Built around 1880, the mill consists of a two-story frame millhouse mounted atop pillars of stacked rocks. A milldam diverted water through a millrace, where it turned the mill's large turbine (when it was operational, the turbine was almost completely submerged). After the state purchased the mill in 1967, a new roof and a new coat of paint were added. The mill is no longer operational.
- The Wolf River Post Office, established as a general store by York in 1925 and used as a post office until the 1970s. The store included a small lean-to gristmill along its north wall.
- The Wolf River Methodist Church, located northeast of the York house (on the opposite bank of the river) along Wolf River Loop. The Wolf River Methodist congregation was established in 1840.
- Wolf River Cemetery, located along Wolf River Loop across the street from Wolf River United Methodist Church. Originally called the Mt. Pleasant Burying Ground, the cemetery was established in the early 19th century. Its earliest known burial dates to 1826. Conrad Pile and most of his descendants, including York and his family, are buried here.
- The York Bible Institute (not to be confused with Alvin C. York Institute), built by York in the 1940s using profits from the 1941 film Sergeant York. The institute functioned only briefly before closing.

An M247 "Sergeant York," a type of self-propelled anti-aircraft tank developed for the U.S. Army in the 1970s, used to be on display near the York house. A swing bridge built by AmeriCorps*NCCC in 2000 crosses the Wolf River along the park's walking trail, connecting the US-127 and Wolf River Loop sections of the park. The park has set up a small "moonshine still" (currently consisting of two copper barrels) near the York Mill.

== See also ==
- List of National Historic Landmarks in Tennessee
- National Register of Historic Places listings in Fentress County, Tennessee
