= Static, Kentucky and Tennessee =

Unincorporated community in Tennessee and Kentucky, United States

Static
- Unincorporated community
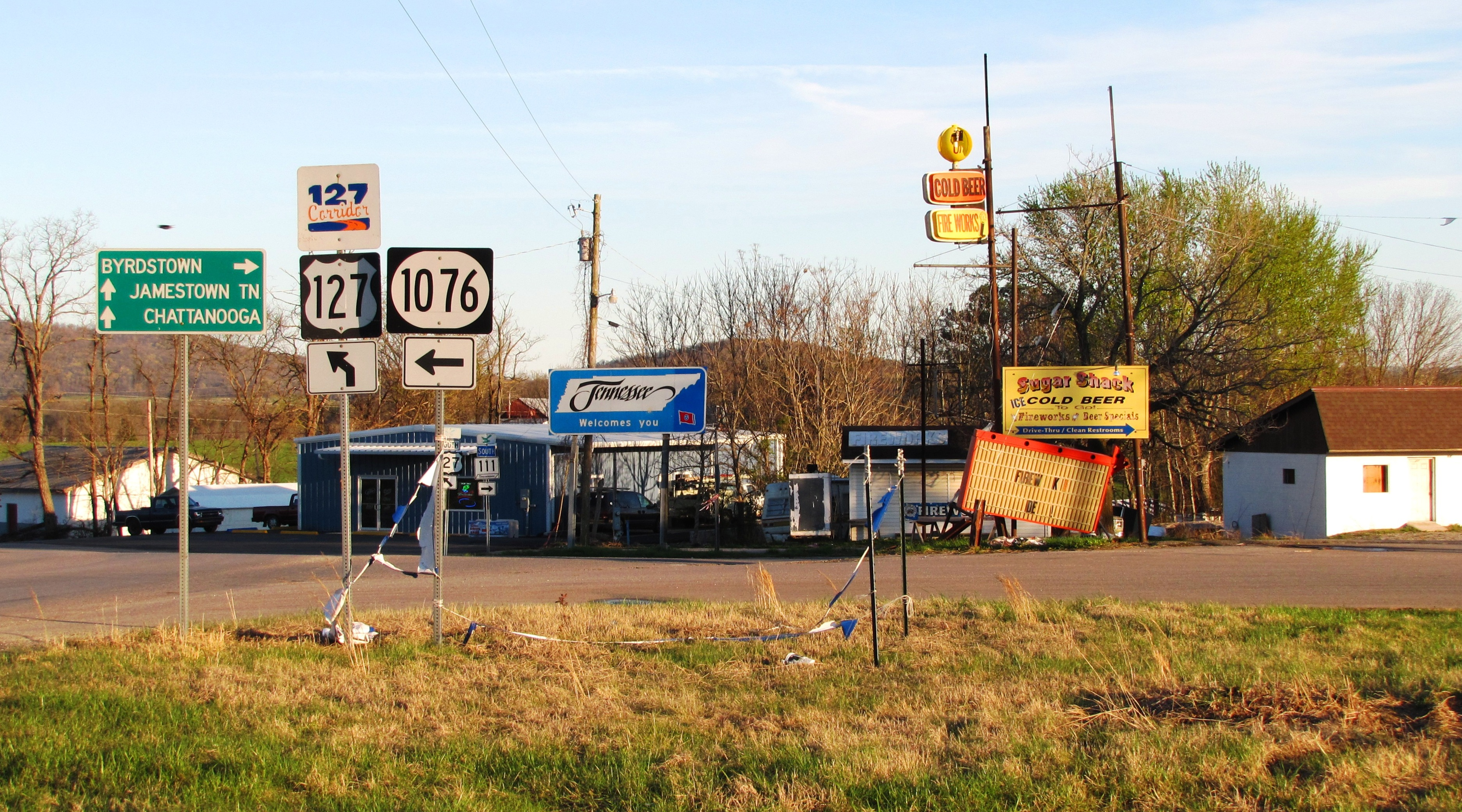
- The intersection of U.S. Route 127, Kentucky Route 1076 and Tennessee State Route 111 in Static, as seen from the Kentucky side prior to 2011

- Location within the state of Kentucky Static (the United States)
- Coordinates: 36°37′19″N 85°5′6″W
- Country: United States
- State: Kentucky, Tennessee
- Counties: Clinton, KY and Pickett, TN
- Elevation: 1,004 ft (306 m)
- Time zone: UTC-6 (Central (CST))
- Area codes: 606 and 931
- GNIS feature ID: 1271280

Static is an unincorporated community in Clinton County, Kentucky, and Pickett County, Tennessee, in the southeastern United States. It is located on the Tennessee–Kentucky state line south of Albany, Kentucky, and north of Byrdstown, Tennessee.

== History ==
According to tradition, Static has the name of a resident's dog, named in the early days of radio. Static has been noted for its unusual place name.

== Geography ==
Static is located at a crossroads intersection involving U.S. Route 127 (US 127, accompanied by the unsigned SR 28 on the Tennessee side), Tennessee State Route 111 (SR 111; formerly SR 42), and Kentucky Route 1076 (KY 1076). Its coordinates are 36°37′19″N latitude, and 85°5′6″W longitude. Using US 127, Jamestown, Tennessee, is 21 miles (34 km) southeast, and Albany, Kentucky, is 6 miles (9.7 km) north. Byrdstown, Tennessee, however, lies the same distance southwest via SR 111.

Dale Hollow Lake is located just west of Static.

== Education ==
In terms of public schools, the Kentucky side of the Static area attends Clinton County Schools based in Albany, while students on the Tennessee side attend the small Pickett County Public Schools system.
