= Pall Mall, Tennessee =

Pall Mall
- Unincorporated community
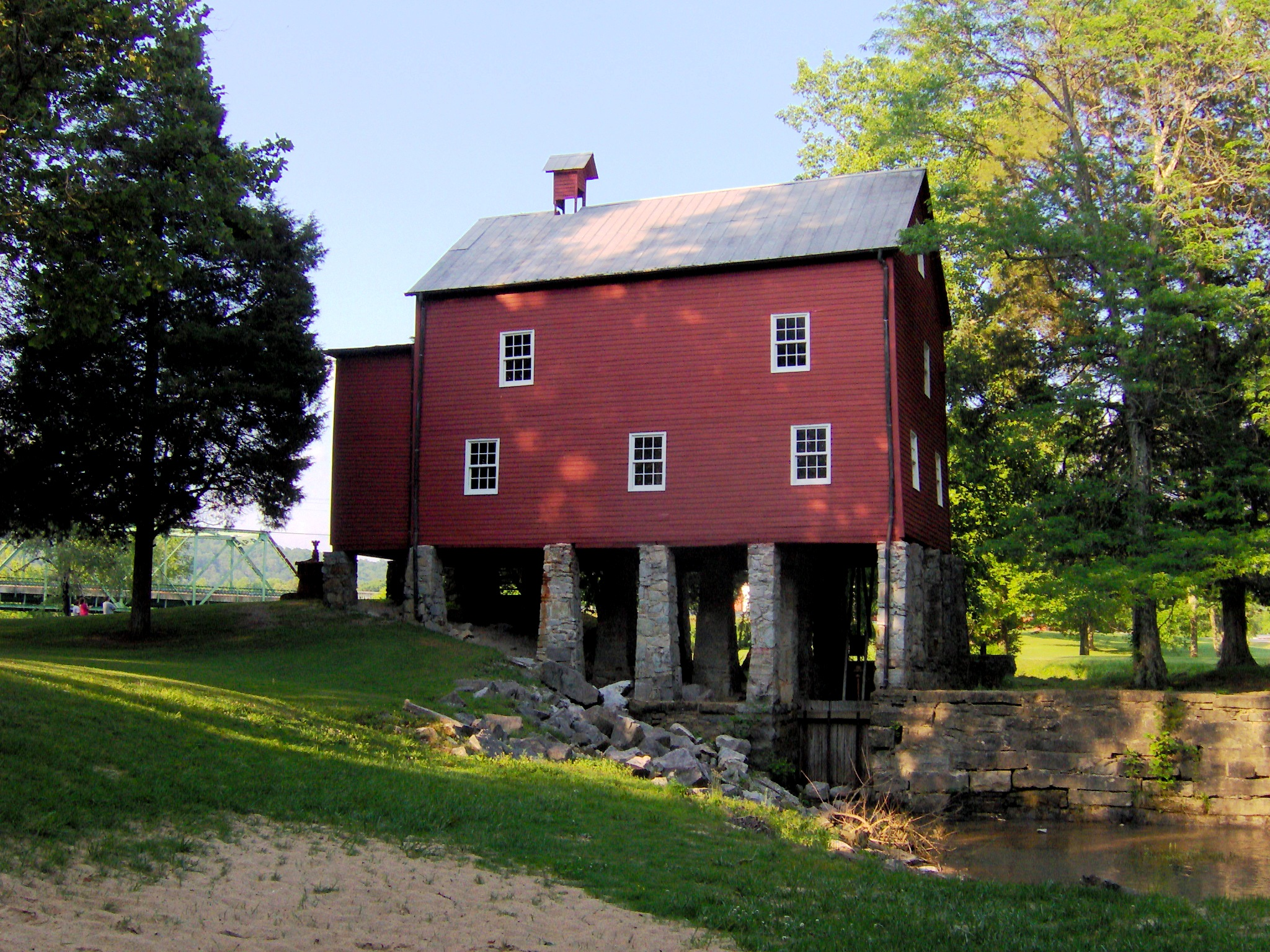
- The mill at Sgt. Alvin C. York State Historic Park

- Location within Tennessee Location within the United States
- Coordinates: 36°33′02″N 84°58′04″W
- Country: United States
- State: Tennessee
- County: Fentress
- Time zone: UTC-6 (Central (CST))
  - Summer (DST): UTC-5 (CDT)
- Zip code: 38577
- Area code: 931

Pall Mall (/pæl mæl/ PAL MAL) is a small unincorporated community in the Wolf River valley of Fentress County, Tennessee, United States. It is named after Pall Mall, London. Pall Mall is located near the Kentucky-Tennessee state-line in northeastern-central Tennessee. The population was at 1,398 people according to the 2000 census.

== Notable people ==
The World War I hero Alvin York was raised in Pall Mall. His son Andrew Jackson York (1919–2022) lived in the community. York is commemorated at the Sgt. Alvin C. York State Historic Park in Pall Mall, which includes the family farmhouse and grist mill. York is buried at Wolf River Cemetery in Pall Mall.

John Marshall Clemens (1798–1847), father of Mark Twain and Orion Clemens, was postmaster of Pall Mall from 1832 to 1835; he, his wife Jane Lampton Clemens, and their children Orion, Pamela, Margaret, and Benjamin (born, perhaps here, in 1832) lived in the community at Three Forks of the Wolf River during this period (1831–1835), where they conceived Mark Twain (though the family moved to Florida, Missouri a few months before he was born).

Other notable natives of Pall Mall include U.S. Representative Lincoln Davis and fugitive Billy Dean Anderson.
