= Wolf River (Middle Tennessee) =

River in Tennessee and Kentucky, United States

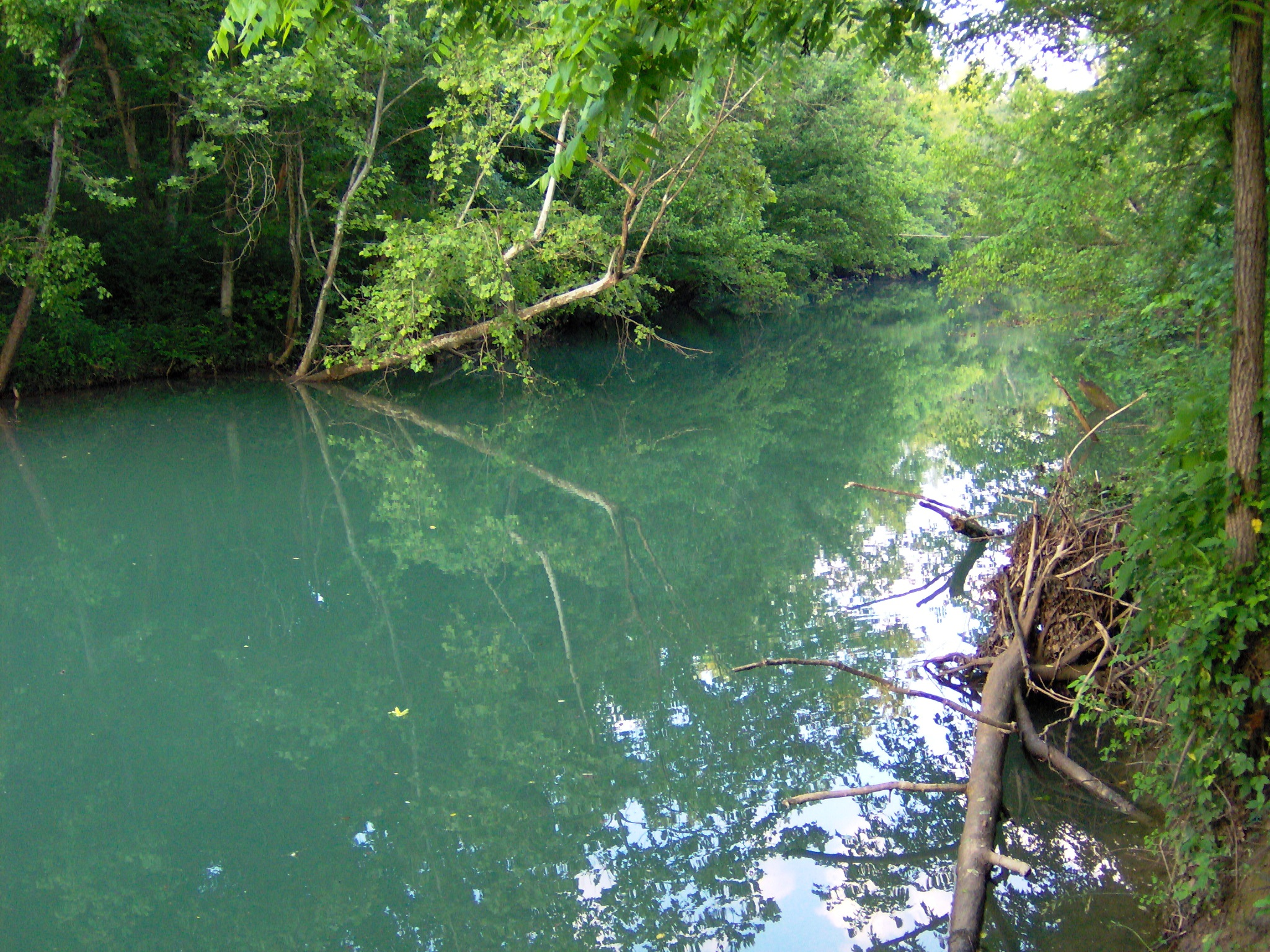
- The Wolf River near Pall Mall, Tennessee

Location
- Country: United States

Physical characteristics
- Source
  - location: Confluence of Pogue Creek and Delk Creek near Pall Mall, Tennessee
- Mouth
  - location: Obey River (now part of Dale Hollow Lake) in northeast Clay County, Tennessee
  - coordinates: 36.6153411°N 85.2980174°W
- Discharge
  - location: Byrdstown
  - average: 186 cu ft/s (5.3 m^{3}/s)

The Wolf River is a 40.3-mile-long (64.9 km) river in the U.S. states of Tennessee and Kentucky that rises at the base of the Cumberland Plateau in Fentress County, Tennessee and flows westward for several miles before becoming part of Dale Hollow Lake. The river is part of the Cumberland River drainage basin in Middle Tennessee and southern Kentucky. Via the Cumberland and Ohio rivers, it is part of the Mississippi River watershed. It is not to be confused with the Wolf River of West Tennessee which flows into the Mississippi at Memphis.

The Wolf River begins at the confluence of Pogue Creek and Delk Creek in a rugged hollow approximately 3 miles (4.8 km) southeast of the community of Pall Mall. Two miles below its source, the river absorbs Rotten Fork before entering the communities of Wolf River and Pall Mall, both of which are associated with World War I hero Alvin C. York. York's farm and gristmill were both located along the river at Pall Mall, and he and his family are buried in the large cemetery at Wolf River. York's farm is now part of a state historic park. The area is known as "the valley of the three forks of the Wolf," as noted in the 1941 film "Sergeant York." Below Pall Mall, the river continues westward across the northeastern Highland Rim into Pickett County, passing just east and north of Byrdstown as it flows through rolling farmland and forest. About a mile downstream from the TN 111 bridge, its water becomes slack due to the impoundment of Dale Hollow Lake on the Obey River. The lake's Wolf River embayment winds along the Kentucky-Tennessee border and has its confluence with the Obey River embayment just southeast of the point where Pickett County, Clay County, Tennessee, and Clinton County, Kentucky meet. Before the lake was impounded by the U.S. Army Corps of Engineers in 1943, the confluence was the site of the community of Lillydale, formerly called Mouth of Wolf. The Lillydale name lives on in a Corps recreation area on the south shore of the lake. The Wolf River embayment also lies in Cumberland County, Kentucky.

== See also ==
- List of rivers of Kentucky
- List of rivers of Tennessee
