= Dale Hollow Reservoir =

Reservoir in Tennessee and Kentucky, United States

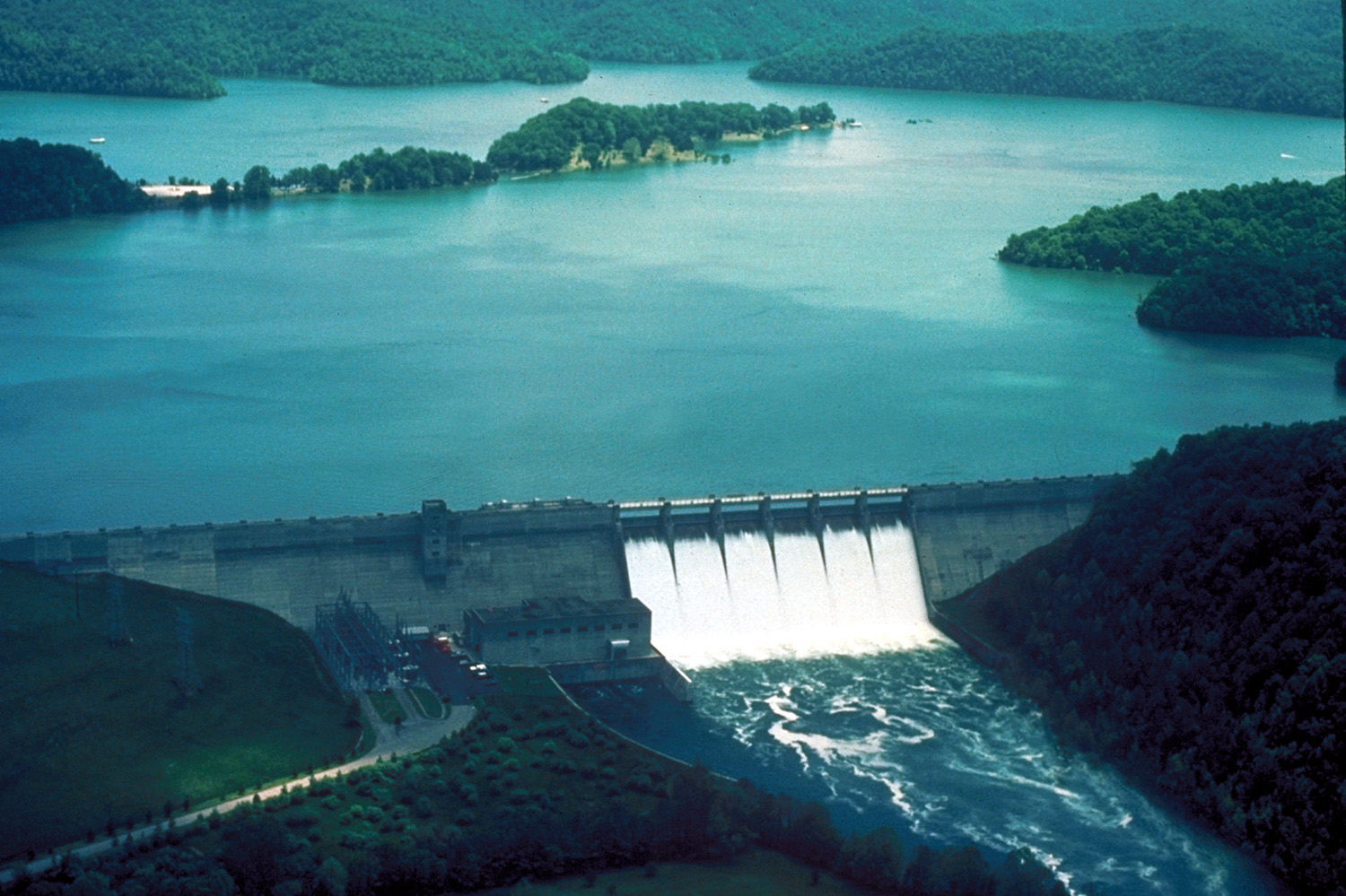
- Dale Hollow Dam and Lake.

- Location within Tennessee Location within the United States
- Location: Kentucky / Tennessee
- Coordinates: 36°32′16″N 85°27′05″W
- Type: reservoir
- Basin countries: United States
- Surface area: 27,700 acres (112 km^{2})
- Surface elevation: 643 ft (196 m)

The Dale Hollow Reservoir, sometimes called Dale Hollow Lake, is a reservoir situated on the Kentucky/Tennessee border. The lake is formed by the damming of the Obey River, 7.3 miles (11.7 km) above its juncture with the Cumberland River at river mile 380. Portions of the lake also cover the Wolf River. Dale Hollow is one of four major flood control reservoirs for the Cumberland; the others being Percy Priest Lake, Lake Cumberland, and Center Hill Lake. It is also the site of Dale Hollow Lake State Park on the north (Kentucky) side.

Electricity from the 200-foot (61-meter) dam is marketed by the Southeastern Power Administration.

== Location ==
Dale Hollow Reservoir lies mainly in northern Tennessee, where it covers portions of Clay, Pickett, and Overton Counties. Small arms of the lake also extend northward into the Kentucky counties of Cumberland and Clinton. The project consists of 27,700 acres (112 km^{2}) of water and 24,842 acres (101 km^{2}) of surrounding land.

== History ==
Dale Hollow Dam and Lake was authorized by the Flood Control Act of 1938 and the River and Harbor Act of 1946. The project was completed by the United States Army Corps of Engineers in 1943. Hydroelectric power generating units were added in 1948, 1949 and 1953. The project was designed by the Corps of Engineers and built under their supervision by private contractors. The hydroelectric generators of Dale Hollow Dam are used to supply power to the Southeast Power Administration and its public and private customers. The dam, power plant and reservoir are currently operated by the Nashville District of the Corps.

The creation of the reservoir resulted in the submerging of a town named Willow Grove. In 1942, the town was purchased by the government in order to create the reservoir. The residents were forced to relocate. Former residents of the town meet annually on Labor Day weekend.

== Recreation ==
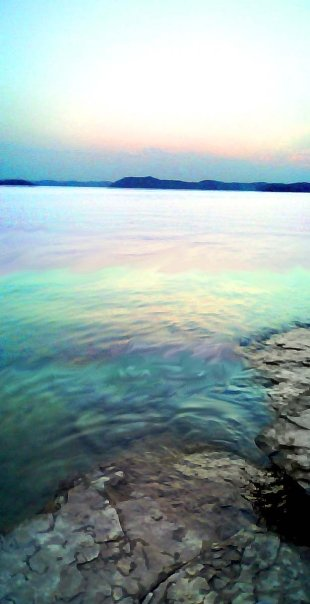
View from Geiger Island

The lake is also used recreationally. Water sports are moderately popular, especially water skiing. Wakeboarding and tubing are two more water sports that can be seen regularly. The main recreational use is fishing. Scuba diving is popular because of the lake water's high clarity.

Dale Hollow is well known as a prime location for smallmouth bass fishing, currently holding the world record for the largest such fish ever taken (11 lb., 15 oz). It is the lake that is linked with the name Billy Westmoreland, famed smallmouth angler of Celina, Tennessee. The lake and surrounding rivers, the Cumberland River and the Obey River also contain other species such as largemouth bass, crappie, muskellunge, walleye, catfish, gar, and trout. In addition to these species, Dale Hallow is a favoured lake amongst carp fishermen in the USA. It is known to contain many large carp, primarily being fully scaled mirror carp.

The Tennessee Wildlife Resources Agency and Kentucky Department of Fish and Wildlife each maintain jurisdiction over the lake's waters within their respective states. There is a reciprocal fishing agreement between the agencies, so recreational fisherman may be licensed by either state in order to fish in the reciprocal zone. Fishermen in areas of the lake outside the zone must be licensed by the governing agency.

== Islands ==
Geiger Island is an island in Dale Hollow Lake. It is designated as a primitive camping site by the United States Army Corps of Engineers, which manages Dale Hollow Reservoir. According to author Darren Shell, the site sees heavy usage during the summer months, and was a traditional camping site of the Boy Scout troops in the area for many years. Henry Geiger, the founder of nearby Cedar Lake Camp, a Christian youth camp in Livingston, Tennessee, was the first to begin camping on the island. The island bears his name.

Trooper Island is another island in Dale Hollow Lake that is owned by the Army Corps of Engineers. The island, which sits on the Kentucky/Tennessee state line, is currently leased to the Kentucky State Police who operate Trooper Island Kid's Camp through a trooper-managed non-profit charitable organization. The facility provides a week-long camp experience for children ages 10–12 from each of the state's 16 KSP post districts at no cost to the camper's families. Campers are supervised by both camp staff and troopers from their local post. The camp also hosts a week-long Youth Academy Program for teens age 16–17 at no charge to participants and their families. The island is typically off-limits to the general public, especially during the summer when campers are on the island. The camp will, however, occasionally host open house and other public events before or after the summer camp season.

== See also ==
- Dale Hollow National Fish Hatchery

== Bibliography ==
- Shell, Darren; Shell, Sheryl (2015). The History of Dale Hollow Lake. Martinsville, Indiana: Fideli Publishing, Inc. ISBN 978-1604140972.
