= Tennessee State Route 30 =

Highway in Tennessee, United States

State Route 30
- SR 30; primary in red, secondary in blue

Route information
- Maintained by TDOT
- Length: 118.15 mi (190.14 km)
- Existed: October 1, 1923–present

Major junctions
- West end: US 70S near McMinnville
- US 127 in Pikeville; US 27 in Dayton; I-75 in Athens; US 411 in Etowah
- East end: US 64 / US 74 in the Cherokee National Forest

Location
- Country: United States
- State: Tennessee
- Counties: Warren, Van Buren, Bledsoe, Rhea, Megis, McMinn, Polk

Highway system
- Tennessee State Routes; Interstate; US; State
← SR 29	→ US 31

State Route 30 (SR 30) is an east-west state highway in the central and eastern portions of the U.S. state of Tennessee. It runs generally west to east, connecting McMinnville in Warren County with Parksville along the Ocoee River in Polk County. It crosses several major geographic features in Tennessee, including the Cumberland Plateau, the Sequatchie Valley, the Tennessee River, and parts of the Cherokee National Forest.

== Route description ==
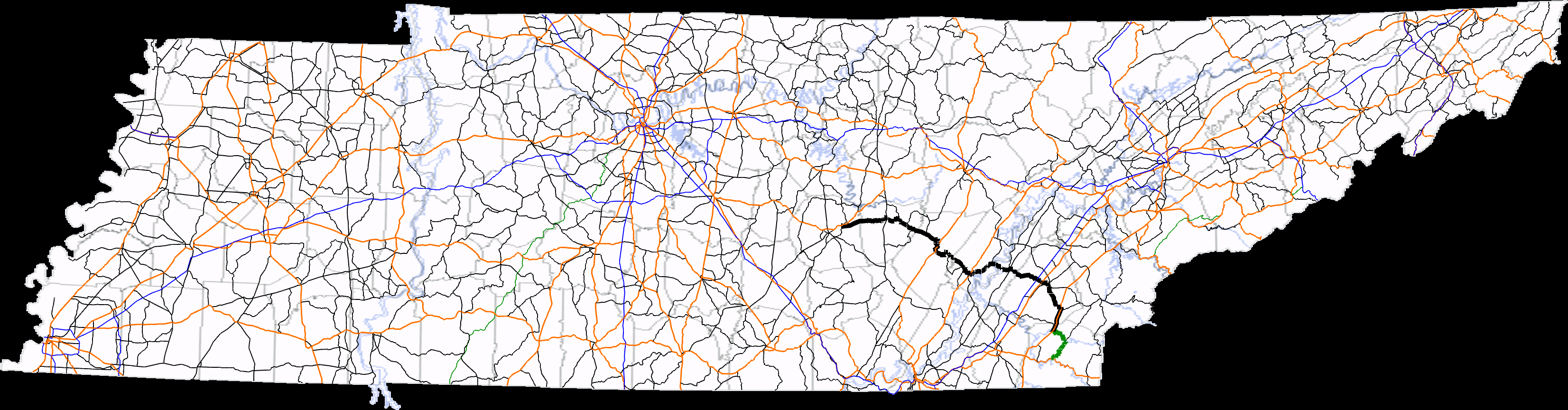
TN SR 30 highlighted in bold black

SR 30 begins just east of McMinnville in Warren County at an intersection with US 70S. Just beyond this initial junction, SR 30 intersects SR 127, which connects the area to Tullahoma to the southwest. SR 30 continues eastward, crossing into Van Buren County at the Rocky River. After passing several miles through predominantly-rural western Van Buren, the highway ascends over 900 feet (270 m) through a series of switchback curves to the top of the Cumberland Plateau, where it enters the town of Spencer. Following College Street through Spencer, SR 30 intersects SR 111 just east of the town's downtown area.

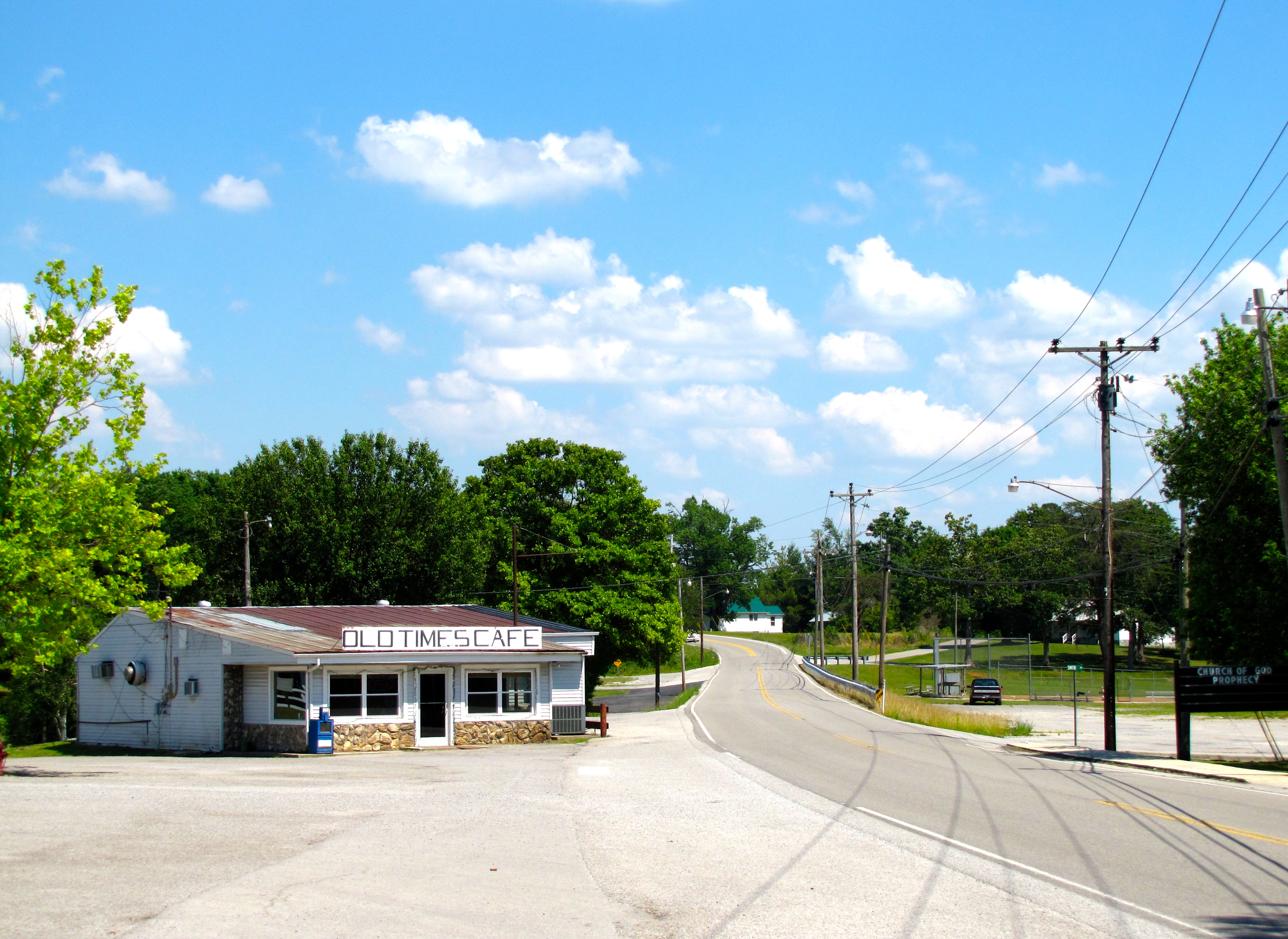
SR 30 in Spencer

Continuing east beyond Spencer, SR 30 descends more than 900 feet (270 m) from the edge of the plateau into the Dry Fork Gulf. This area marks the outer reaches of Fall Creek Falls State Park. At the base of the valley, SR 30 crosses Cane Creek and joins SR 285, which approaches from further down the valley in the direction of Doyle. The merged highway then continues eastward, reascending more than 800 feet (240 m) back to the top of the plateau, before SR 285 diverges northward, and SR 30 continues toward the east. Just before reaching the Van Buren-Bledsoe county line, SR 30 intersects SR 284, which provides the primary access to Fall Creek Falls State Park to the south.

In the Mount Crest area of western Bledsoe, SR 30 intersects SR 101, which runs in a northeastward direction to Crossville. Just past Mount Crest, SR 30 begins another significant elevation change, this time descending more than 1,000 feet (300 m) from the edge of Cumberland Plateau into the Sequatchie Valley. This particularly steep section of the highway endures occasional closures due to rockslides. In Pikeville, SR 30 merges with the north-south-oriented US 127. This merged route travels along the east side of Pikeville before the two highways split just south of the downtown area, with US 127 continuing southward to Dunlap, and SR 30 crossing the Sequatchie River before turning east.

Continuing across the relatively narrow Sequatchie Valley, SR 30 begins another ascent of the Cumberland Plateau, climbing more than 1,000 feet (300 m) before topping out near Summer City. After traversing this section of the plateau, known as Walden Ridge, and crossing into Rhea County, SR 30 enters its final major elevation change, this time winding its way more than 1,200 feet (370 m) down the side of the Cumberland Plateau into the Tennessee Valley. In Dayton, SR 30 intersects US 27, which connects Dayton with Chattanooga to the south.

After crossing the Tennessee River east of Dayton, SR 30 continues winding its away around the various ridges and valleys that characterize the region, and passes through the county seats of Decatur and Athens. In the latter city, SR 30 crosses I-75 and US 11, both of which run northeastward to Knoxville and southwestward to Chattanooga. In Etowah in eastern McMinn County, SR 30 merges with US 411, and veers southward into Polk County. The highway provides access to Hiwassee/Ocoee Scenic River State Park (via Spring Creek Road) before crossing the Hiwassee River, with SR 30 splitting off from US 411 less than one mile (1.6 km) later, turning eastward up the Hiwassee Valley into the Cherokee National Forest.

In the old community of Reliance, SR 30 intersects SR 315, which runs northward in the direction of Tellico Plains. Just past this junction, SR 30 turns sharply to the south, and winds its way into the Greasy Creek Valley. The highway follows this valley southwestward to the Parksville area along the Ocoee River, where it terminates at US 64 and US 74.

== History ==
SR 30 was one of the original routes of the Tennessee State Route System, established on October 1, 1923, between Pikeville and Dayton. Around 1927 or 1928, SR 30 was extended west to McMinnville and east to Athens. The latter extension utilized Washington Ferry, a historic ferry crossing the Tennessee River that had been established around 1807. In 1931 or 1932, the route was extended east to US 411 in Englewood. Around 1941, SR 30 was swapped with SR 39 between Athens and Englewood, extended along its present-day concurrency with US 411, and replaced SR 40 between this route and US 64.

In 1973, the 1.8-mile (2.9 km) section of SR 30 between I-75 and US 11 was widened to four lanes. On September 17, 1996, the Washington Ferry Bridge across the Tennessee River opened, replacing Washington Ferry which closed the same day. The bridge was dedicated in honor of Tennessee Governor Ned McWherter on August 19, 2014. During his term as governor, McWherter worked to appropriate funds for the bridge and the expansion of SR 30 to four lanes between Decatur and I-75.

== Major intersections ==
County	Location	mi	km	Destinations	Notes
Warren		0.0	0.0	US 70S (Sparta Highway/SR 1) – McMinnville, Doyle, Sparta	Western terminus; SR 30 begins as a primary highway
Warren				SR 127 south (Shellsford Road) – McMinnville, Viola	Northern terminus of SR 127
Van Buren	Spencer			SR 111 (Artillery Road) – Sparta, Dunlap	Interchange
Van Buren				SR 285 west (Cane Creek-Cummingsville Road) – Doyle	Western end of SR 285 concurrency
Van Buren				SR 285 east (Mooneyham Road)	Eastern end of SR 285 concurrency
Bledsoe				SR 284 west (Park Road) – Fall Creek Falls State Park	Eastern terminus of SR 284
Bledsoe	Mount Crest			SR 101 north (Lantana Road) – Lake Tansi Village, Crossville	Southern terminus of SR 101
Bledsoe	Pikeville			US 127 north (Alvin C. York Highway/SR 28 north) – Crossville	Western end of US 127/SR 28 concurrency
Bledsoe	Pikeville			US 127 south (Alvin C. York Highway/SR 28 south) – Dunlap	Eastern end of US 127/SR 28 overlap
Bledsoe	Pikeville			Bridge over the Sequatchie River	
Bledsoe	Summer City			SR 443 east (New Harmony Road) – New Harmony	Western terminus of SR 443
Rhea				SR 443 west (Ogden Road) – Ogden	Eastern terminus of SR 443
Rhea				SR 303 south (Cranmore Cove Road) – Graysville	Northern terminus of SR 303
Rhea	Dayton			SR 378 north (Market Street)	Western end of SR 378 concurrency
Rhea	Dayton			SR 378 south (Market Street)	Eastern end of SR 378 concurrency
Rhea	Dayton			US 27 (Rhea County Highway/SR 29) – Chattanooga, Soddy-Daisy, Spring City	
Rhea	Old Washington			SR 302 north (Old Dixie Highway) – Spring City	Southern terminus of SR 302
Tennessee River				Washington Ferry Bridge over the Tennessee River	
Meigs	Decatur			SR 58 (Meigs County Highway) – Kingston, Georgetown, Chattanooga	
McMinn	Athens			I-75 – Chattanooga, Knoxville	I-75 exit 49
McMinn	Athens			US 11 (Congress Parkway/SR 2) – Cleveland, Calhoun, Charleston, Niota, Sweetwater	
McMinn	Athens			US 11 Bus. (N Jackson Street) – Downtown	
McMinn	Athens			SR 39 west (E Washington Avenue/E Madison Avenue) – Downtown, Riceville	one-way pair; western end of SR 39 concurrency
McMinn	Athens			SR 305 north (Ingleside Avenue) / SR 307 north (E Madison Avenue) to I-75 – Sweetwater	Southern terminus of SR 305 and SR 307
McMinn	Athens			SR 39 east (New Englewood Road) – Englewood	Eastern end of SR 39 concurrency
McMinn	Etowah			US 411 north (Tennessee Avenue/SR 33 north) – Englewood	Western end of US 411/SR 33 concurrency
McMinn	Etowah			SR 310 east (Mecca Pike) – Tellico Plains	Western terminus of SR 310
Polk	Delano			SR 163 west (Bowater Road) to I-75 – Calhoun	Eastern terminus of SR 163
Polk	Delano			Bridge over the Hiwassee River	
Polk	Delano			US 411 south (SR 33 south) – Benton	Eastern end of US 411/SR 33 concurrency; SR 30 turns secondary
Polk	Reliance			SR 315 north (Reliance Road) – Tellico Plains	Southern terminus of SR 315
Polk	Cherokee National Forest	118.15	190.14	US 64 / US 74 (Ocoee Scenic Byway/SR 40) – Cleveland, Ocoee, Ducktown	Eastern terminus; SR 30 ends as a secondary highway
1.000 mi = 1.609 km; 1.000 km = 0.621 mi: Concurrency terminus
