= Tennessee State Route 39 =

State highway in McMinn and Monroe counties in Tennessee, United States

State Route 39
- SR 39; primary in red, secondary in blue

Route information
- Maintained by TDOT
- Length: 31.8 mi (51.2 km)
- Existed: October 1, 1923–present

Major junctions
- West end: I-75 in Riceville
- US 11 in Riceville; SR 30 in Athens; US 411 in Englewood
- East end: SR 68 in Tellico Plains

Location
- Country: United States
- State: Tennessee
- Counties: McMinn, Monroe

Highway system
- Tennessee State Routes; Interstate; US; State
← SR 38	→ I-40

State Route 39 (SR 39) is a state highway in McMinn and Monroe counties in the eastern portion of the U.S. state of Tennessee.

== Route description ==
SR 39 begins as a secondary highway in McMinn County in Riceville at Exit 42 on I-75. It then goes east as a 2-lane country road to the center of town and has a short concurrency with US 11/SR 2. It then turns northeast, now concurrent with US 11 Business (US 11 Bus), to parallel US 11/SR 2 and leave Riceville to go through some countryside before entering Athens. SR 39/US 11 Bus then goes through some suburbs and passes by Starr Regional Medical Center before entering downtown, where US 11 Bus turns northwest to join back up with US 11/SR 2. At the same time, SR 39 continues through downtown to an intersection with SR 30/SR 305/SR 307, where SR 39 turns south to become concurrent with SR 30 as a 4-lane divided highway. SR 39/SR 30 then cross over a ridge, where they leave Athens, just before the intersection where SR 39 separates from SR 30 and goes east as a rural 2-lane highway through the countryside of McMinn County before entering Englewood. It travels along various city streets through downtown before coming to an intersection with US 411/SR 33, which it turns north to become concurrent with as a 4-lane undivided highway and they go through a business district before SR 39 separates and turns east, becoming a primary highway and leaving Englewood as a curvy 2-lane highway as it enters some mountains and ridges. It winds its way through the mountains to an intersection with SR 310, where it becomes a primary highway, just before crossing into Monroe County.

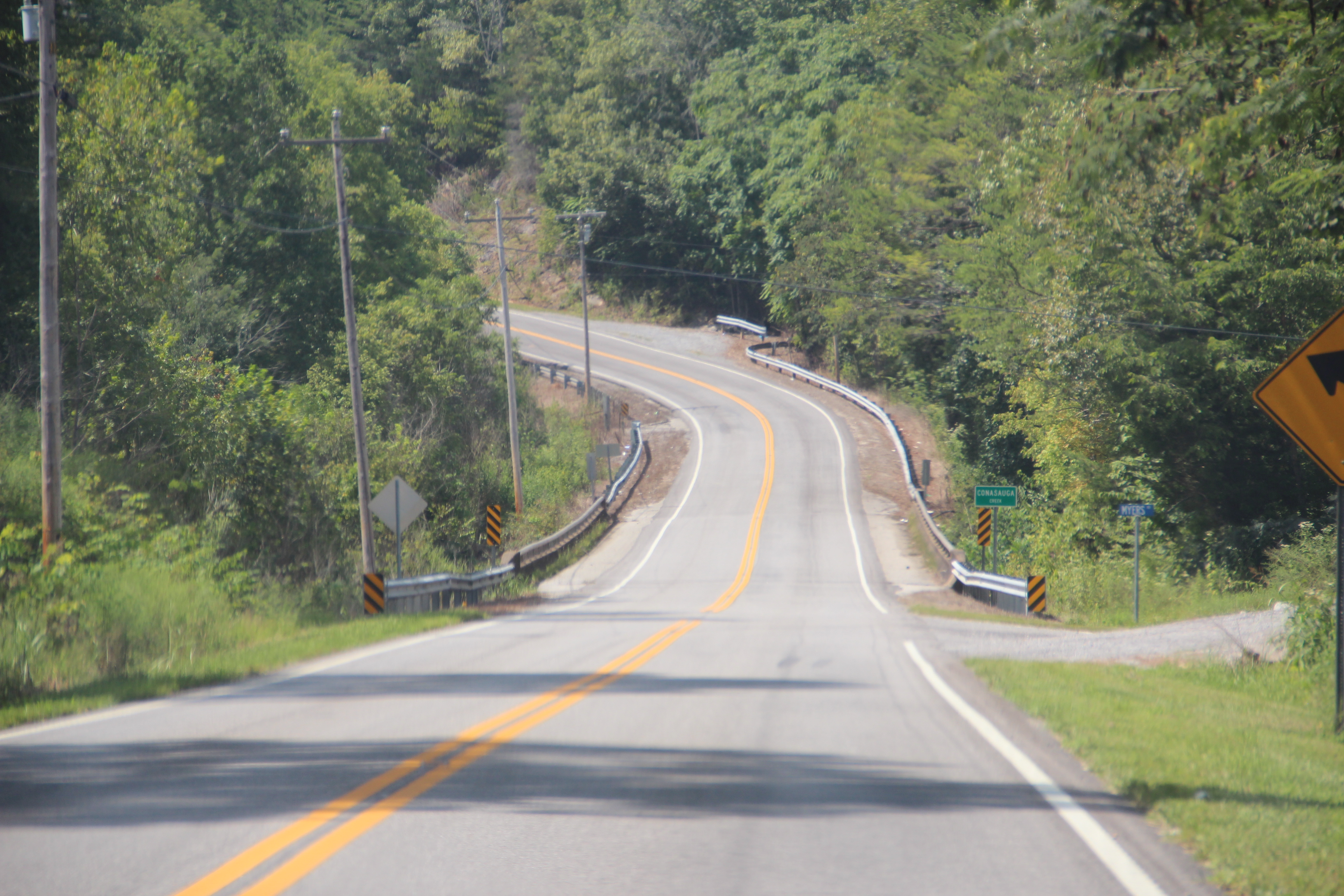
SR 39 crossing of Conasauga Creek in Monroe County, September 2019

The curves then straighten out as SR 39 leaves the mountains, crosses the Conasauga Creek, and starts going through some farmland. SR 39 passes through Jalapa and has a Y-intersection with SR 315 before going through some more farmland before ending at an intersection with SR 68, just north of Tellico Plains.

== Major intersections ==
County	Location	mi	km	Destinations	Notes
McMinn	Riceville	0.00	0.00	I-75 – Chattanooga, Knoxville	I-75 exit 42; western terminus; SR 39 begins as a secondary highway
McMinn	Riceville			US 11 north (Lee Highway/SR 2) – Athens	Begin with concurrency with US 11/SR 2
McMinn	Riceville			US 11 south (Lee Highway/SR 2) / US 11 Bus. north – Calhoun, Charleston, Cleveland	End concurrency with US 11/SR 2; Begin concurrency with US 11 Business; Southern terminus of US 11 Business
McMinn	Athens			US 11 Bus. north (N Jackson Street/N White Street) / SR 30 west (Green Street) / SR 305 north (Ingleside Avenue) / SR 307 north (E Madison Avenue)	End concurrency with US 11 Business; Begin concurrency with SR 30; Southern terminus for both SR 305 & SR 307
McMinn	Athens			SR 30 east (S White Street) – Etowah	End concurrency with SR 30
McMinn	Englewood			US 411 south (SR 33) – Etowah	Begin concurrency with US 411/SR 33
McMinn	Englewood			US 411 north (SR 33) – Madisonville	End concurrency with US 411/SR 33
McMinn	Mecca			SR 310 (Mecca Pike) – Etowah	Eastern terminus of SR 310; SR 39 turns primary
Monroe	Jalapa			SR 315 south (Reliance Road) – Reliance	Northern terminus of SR 315
Monroe	Tellico Plains	31.8	51.2	SR 68 (New Highway 68) to SR 165 (Cherohala Skyway) – Coker Creek, Madisonville, Ducktown, Robbinsville, North Carolina	Eastern terminus; SR 39 ends as a primary highway
1.000 mi = 1.609 km; 1.000 km = 0.621 mi: Concurrency terminus
