= Tennessee State Route 315 =

Highway in Tennessee, United States

State Route 315
- Tellico-Reliance Road
- SR 315 highlighted in red

Route information
- Maintained by TDOT
- Length: 15.0 mi (24.1 km)
- Existed: July 1, 1983–present

Major junctions
- South end: SR 30 in Reliance
- North end: SR 39 in Jalapa

Location
- Country: United States
- State: Tennessee
- Counties: Polk, Monroe

Highway system
- Tennessee State Routes; Interstate; US; State
← SR 314	→ SR 316

State Route 315 (SR 315), also known as Tellico-Reliance Road, is a 15.0-mile-long (24.1 km) north–south state highway in the Unicoi Mountains region of southeastern East Tennessee.

== Route description ==
SR 315 begins in Polk County in Reliance at an intersection with SR 30. It immediately heads across the Hiwassee River via a long bridge to pass through the community before leaving Reliance and entering the Unicoi Mountains and the Cherokee National Forest. The highway then winds its way northeast through the mountains to cross into Monroe County. SR 315 then leaves the mountains and the forest to pass through farmland before coming to an end at an intersection with SR 39 in Jalapa. The entire route of SR 315 is a rural two-lane highway.

== Major intersections ==
County	Location	mi	km	Destinations	Notes
Polk	Reliance	0.0	0.0	SR 30 – Etowah, Delano, Cherokee National Forest	Southern terminus
Polk	Reliance			Bridge over the Hiwassee River	
Monroe	Jalapa	15.0	24.1	SR 39 (Mecca Pike) – Englewood, Etowah, Tellico Plains	Northern terminus
1.000 mi = 1.609 km; 1.000 km = 0.621 mi
