= Tennessee State Route 284 =

State highway in Tennessee, United States

State Route 284
- SR 284 highlighted in red

Route information
- Maintained by TDOT
- Length: 15.3 mi (24.6 km)
- Existed: July 1, 1983–present

Major junctions
- West end: SR 111 south of Spencer
- East end: SR 30 near Mount Crest

Location
- Country: United States
- State: Tennessee
- Counties: Van Buren, Bledsoe

Highway system
- Tennessee State Routes; Interstate; US; State
← SR 283	→ SR 285

State Route 284 (SR 284) is a 15.3-mile-long (24.6 km) state highway in Van Buren County in the central portion and in Bledsoe County in the eastern portion of the U.S. state of Tennessee. It serves as a connector for SR 111 and SR 30 to Fall Creek Falls State Resort Park.

== Route description ==
SR 284 begins in Van Buren County at an interchange with SR 111 south of Spencer, the route heads east Piney Road, it the turns north onto a former alignment of SR 111 and turns back to east as Archie Rhinehart Parkway to Fall Creek Falls State Resort Park. Just past the entrance to the park it becomes a divided two lane road. At an intersection SR 284 turns northeast and bypasses the main section of the park and makes a half loop, the road continues straight as Village Camp Road which accesses the main part of the park. It the briefly enters Bledsoe County before turning back into Van Buren. In the northern part of the park SR 284 meets back up with Village Camp Road. SR 284 turns north and leaves the park 1.3 miles past the Village Camp Road intersection at the Betty Dunn Nature Center. The route ends at SR 30 between Spencer and Mount Crest.

== Major intersections ==
County	Location	mi	km	Destinations	Notes
Van Buren		0.0	0.0	SR 111 – Dunlap, Spencer	Interchange; western terminus
Bledsoe	No major junctions				
Van Buren		15.3	24.6	SR 30 – Spencer, Pikeville	Eastern terminus
1.000 mi = 1.609 km; 1.000 km = 0.621 mi

== See also ==
- List of state routes in Tennessee
