= Tennessee State Route 307 =

State highway in Tennessee, United States

State Route 307
- SR 307 highlighted in red

Route information
- Maintained by TDOT
- Length: 10.9 mi (17.5 km)
- Existed: July 1, 1983–present

Major junctions
- South end: SR 30 / SR 39 in Athens
- North end: SR 68 near Sweetwater

Location
- Country: United States
- State: Tennessee
- Counties: McMinn, Monroe

Highway system
- Tennessee State Routes; Interstate; US; State
| ← SR 306 | → SR 308 |

State Route 307 (SR 307) is a north–south state highway in McMinn and Monroe counties of East Tennessee.

== Route description ==
SR 307 begins in McMinn County in downtown Athens at an intersection with SR 30 and SR 39. It goes northeast along East Madison Avenue before following Eastanallee Avenue to pass through neighborhoods. SR 307 then merges back onto East Madison Avenue to cross a bridge over a creek and pass the headquarters of Mayfield Dairy. The highway continues northeast through neighborhoods before leaving Athens and passes through farmland as Old Athens Madisonville Road. It then crosses into Monroe County as Eastanaula Road and continues northeast through farmland and rural areas before coming to an end at an intersection with SR 68 between Sweetwater and Madisonville, approximately one-half mile (0.80 km) west of The Lost Sea.

== Major intersections ==
| County | Location | mi | km | Destinations | Notes |
|---|---|---|---|---|---|
| McMinn | Athens | 0.0 | 0.0 | SR 30 / SR 39 east (Green Street) to I-75 – Decatur, Englewood, Etowah SR 39 west (East Washington Avenue/East Madison Avenue) – Riceville | Southern terminus |
| Monroe | | 10.9 | 17.5 | SR 68 (New Highway 68) – Sweetwater, Madisonville | Northern terminus |
1.000 mi = 1.609 km; 1.000 km = 0.621 mi
