= Tennessee State Route 443 =

State highway in Tennessee, United States

State Route 443
- New Harmony Road; Ogden Road
- TN 443 highlighted in red

Route information
- Maintained by TDOT
- Length: 12.2 mi (19.6 km)

Major junctions
- West end: SR 30 in Summer City
- East end: SR 30 near Dayton

Location
- Country: United States
- State: Tennessee
- Counties: Bledsoe, Rhea

Highway system
- Tennessee State Routes; Interstate; US; State
← SR 441	→ SR 444

State Route 443 (SR 443) is a 12.2-mile-long (19.6 km) east–west state highway in East Tennessee, connecting SR 30 with the communities of New Harmony and Ogden along with other rural areas, which is primarily farmland.

== Route description ==
SR 443 begins as New Harmony Road in Bledsoe County in Summer City at an intersection with SR 30. It winds its way south through farmland to pass through the community of New Harmony before turning southeast onto Ogden Road. The highway then passes through some wooded areas before crossing into Rhea County. SR 443 continues southeast through wooded areas before making a sharp turn to the northeast and reentering farmland. It continues to wind its way northeast, then east through farmland for several miles, where it passes through the community of Ogden, before coming to an end at another intersection with SR 30, just across Walden Ridge from Dayton. The entire route of SR 443 is a two-lane highway and lies entirely atop the Cumberland Plateau.

== Major intersections ==
County	Location	mi	km	Destinations	Notes
Bledsoe	Summer City	0.0	0.0	SR 30 – Pikeville, Dayton	Western terminus
Rhea		12.2	19.6	SR 30 (Dayton Mountain Highway) – Dayton, Pikeville	Eastern terminus
1.000 mi = 1.609 km; 1.000 km = 0.621 mi
