= Tennessee State Route 285 =

State highway in Tennessee, United States

State Route 285
- SR 285 highlighted in red

Route information
- Maintained by TDOT
- Length: 27.4 mi (44.1 km)
- Existed: July 1, 1983–present

Major junctions
- West end: US 70S in Doyle
- SR 111 east of Doyle
- East end: SR 101 north of Mount Crest

Location
- Country: United States
- State: Tennessee
- Counties: White, Van Buren, Bledsoe

Highway system
- Tennessee State Routes; Interstate; US; State
← SR 284	→ SR 286

State Route 285 (SR 285) is a state highway in White and Van Buren counties in Middle Tennessee and Bledsoe County in East Tennessee.

== Route description ==
SR 285 begins at an intersection with US 70S in Doyle in White County. It initially runs in a southeastwardly direction, briefly merging with SR 111, where it crosses into Van Buren County, before splitting off and winding its way up the Cane Creek Valley. At the outer edges of Fall Creek Falls State Park, SR 285 joins SR 30, which approaches from Spencer to the west. The merged highway then ascends more than 800 feet (240 m) to the top of the Cumberland Plateau before diverging again, with SR 30 continuing eastward, and SR 285 turning northward through a rural stretch of the Plateau region. Bending southeastward again, SR 285 enters Bledsoe County and crosses Bee Creek and passes Bledsoe State Forest before it has a y-intersection with SR 301, which provides access to Taft Youth Center. SR 285 then terminates at its intersection with SR 101 north of Mount Crest.

== Junction list ==
County	Location	mi	km	Destinations	Notes
White	Doyle	0.0	0.0	US 70S (Memorial Highway/SR 1) – Sparta, McMinnville	Western terminus
White				SR 111 north (Spencer Highway) – Sparta	Western end of SR 111 concurrency
Van Buren				SR 111 south – Spencer	Eastern end of SR 111 conurrency
Van Buren	Fall Creek Falls State Resort Park			SR 30 west – Spencer	Western end of SR 30 concurrency
Van Buren	Fall Creek Falls State Resort Park			SR 30 east – Pikeville	Eastern terminus of SR 30 concurrency
Bledsoe				SR 301 north – Taft Youth Center	Southern terminus of SR 301
Bledsoe		27.4	44.1	SR 101 – Spencer, Pikeville, Crossville	Eastern terminus
1.000 mi = 1.609 km; 1.000 km = 0.621 mi: Concurrency terminus
