= Sweetgum, Tennessee =

- Unincorporated community
- Interactive map of Sweetgum, Tennessee
- Coordinates: 35°47′36″N 85°24′32″W
- Country: United States
- State: Tennessee
- County: Van Buren
- Elevation: 879 ft (268 m)
- Time zone: UTC-6 (Central (CST))
  - Summer (DST): UTC-5 (CDT)
- ZIP Code: 38585
- Area code: 931
- GNIS feature ID: 1314368

Sweetgum is an unincorporated community in Van Buren County, Tennessee, United States. It is located on Tennessee State Route 285 5.4 miles (8.7 km) west of Spencer.
