= Tennessee State Route 310 =

State Highway in Tennessee, USA

State Route 310
- Mecca Pike
- TN 310 highlighted in red

Route information
- Maintained by TDOT
- Length: 6.3 mi (10.1 km)
- Existed: July 1, 1983–present

Major junctions
- West end: US 411 / SR 30 in Etowah
- East end: SR 39 in Mecca

Location
- Country: United States
- State: Tennessee
- Counties: McMinn

Highway system
- Tennessee State Routes; Interstate; US; State
← SR 309	→ SR 311

State Route 310 (SR 310), also known as Mecca Pike, is a short east–west state highway in McMinn County, Tennessee. It connects Etowah, via SR 39, to Tellico Plains.

== Route description ==
SR 310 begins in Etowah at an intersection with US 411/SR 30 (Tennessee Avenue/SR 33). It goes east to cross a bridge over some railroad tracks before leaving Etowah and going down a narrow valley between mountains. SR 310 passes through the community of Conasauga before passing along the edge of the Cherokee National Forest, to the south, before entering the community of Mecca. It crosses a bridge over a creek before coming to an end at an intersection with SR 39.

SR 310 is a two-lane rural highway for its entire length.

== Major intersections ==
The entire route is in McMinn County.

Location	mi	km	Destinations	Notes
Etowah	0.0	0.0	US 411 / SR 30 (Tennessee Avenue/SR 33) – Benton, Delano, Athens, Englewood	Western terminus
Mecca	6.3	10.1	SR 39 (Liberty Hill Road/Mecca Pike) – Englewood, Tellico Plains	Eastern terminus; Mecca Pike continues east along SR 39
1.000 mi = 1.609 km; 1.000 km = 0.621 mi
