= Pailo, Tennessee =

Pailo
- Unincorporated community
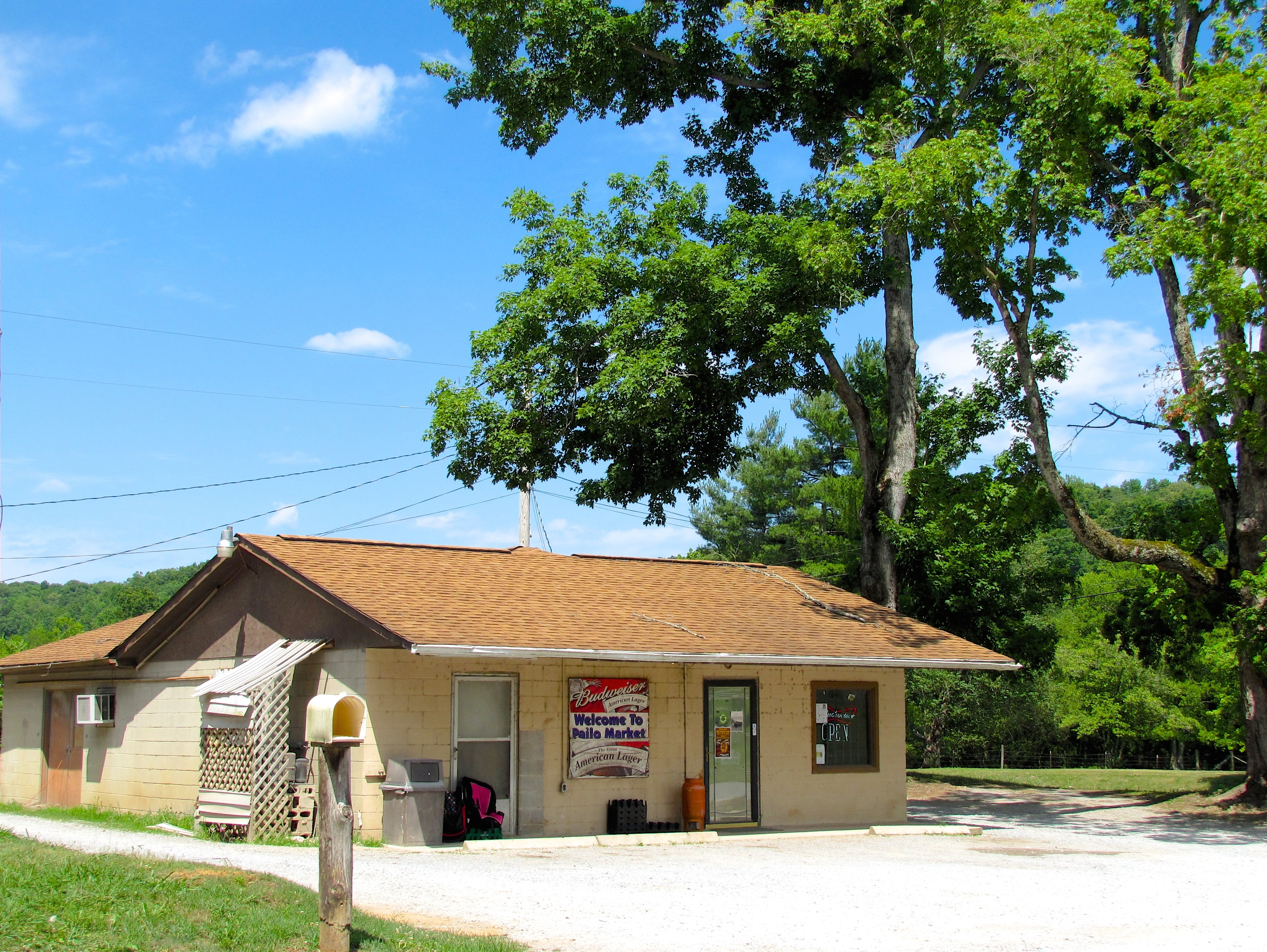
- Pailo Market

- Location within the state of Tennessee Pailo (the United States)
- Coordinates: 35°28′14″N 85°19′12″W
- Country: United States
- State: Tennessee
- County: Bledsoe
- Elevation: 755 ft (230 m)
- Time zone: UTC-6 (Central (CST))
  - Summer (DST): UTC-5 (CDT)
- GNIS feature ID: 1315668

Pailo is an unincorporated community in Bledsoe County, Tennessee. It lies along U.S. Route 127 southwest of the city of Pikeville, the county seat of Bledsoe County.
