= Dill, Tennessee =

Dill Brockdell
- Unincorporated community
- Location within the state of Tennessee Dill (the United States)
- Coordinates: 35°33′23″N 85°21′30″W
- Country: United States
- State: Tennessee
- County: Bledsoe
- Elevation: 1,742 ft (531 m)
- Time zone: UTC-6 (Central (CST))
  - Summer (DST): UTC-5 (CDT)
- GNIS feature ID: 1647449

Dill, also known as Brockdell, is an unincorporated community in Bledsoe County, Tennessee, United States. It lies west of the city of Pikeville, the county seat of Bledsoe County. Its elevation is 1,742 feet (531 m).
