= Minnie Welch =

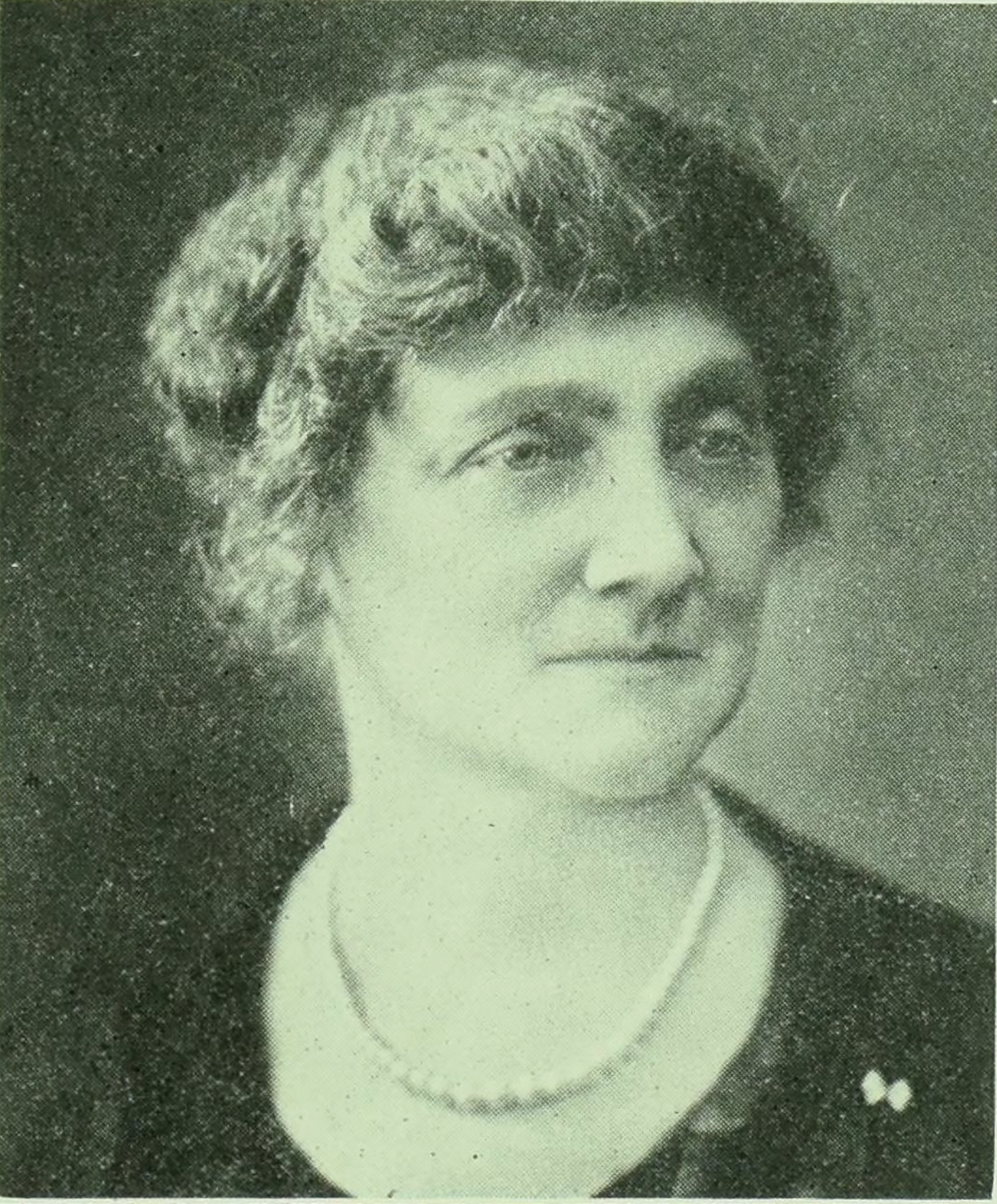
- Welch in a 1930 publication.
- Born: Minnie Josephine Allison; October 27, 1871; Riceville, Tennessee, U.S.
- Died: July 27, 1962 (aged 90); Chattanooga, Tennessee
- Education: Tennessee Valley College
- Occupations: temperance reformer; executive
- Organization: Woman's Christian Temperance Union (WCTU)
- Known for: President of the Tennessee WCTU
- Spouse: John M. Welch (m. 1893)

Minnie Welch (née Allison; 1871–1962) was an American temperance reformer. She served as President of the Woman's Christian Temperance Union (WCTU) of Tennessee for 28 years.

== Early life and education ==
Minnie Josephine Allison was born at Riceville, Tennessee, on October 27, 1871. Her father was of Scottish and Irish descent, while her mother's ancestors were from Holland and Germany. Minnie had at least four sisters.

She was educated in the Tennessee public schools and at Tennessee Valley College (1891).

== Career ==
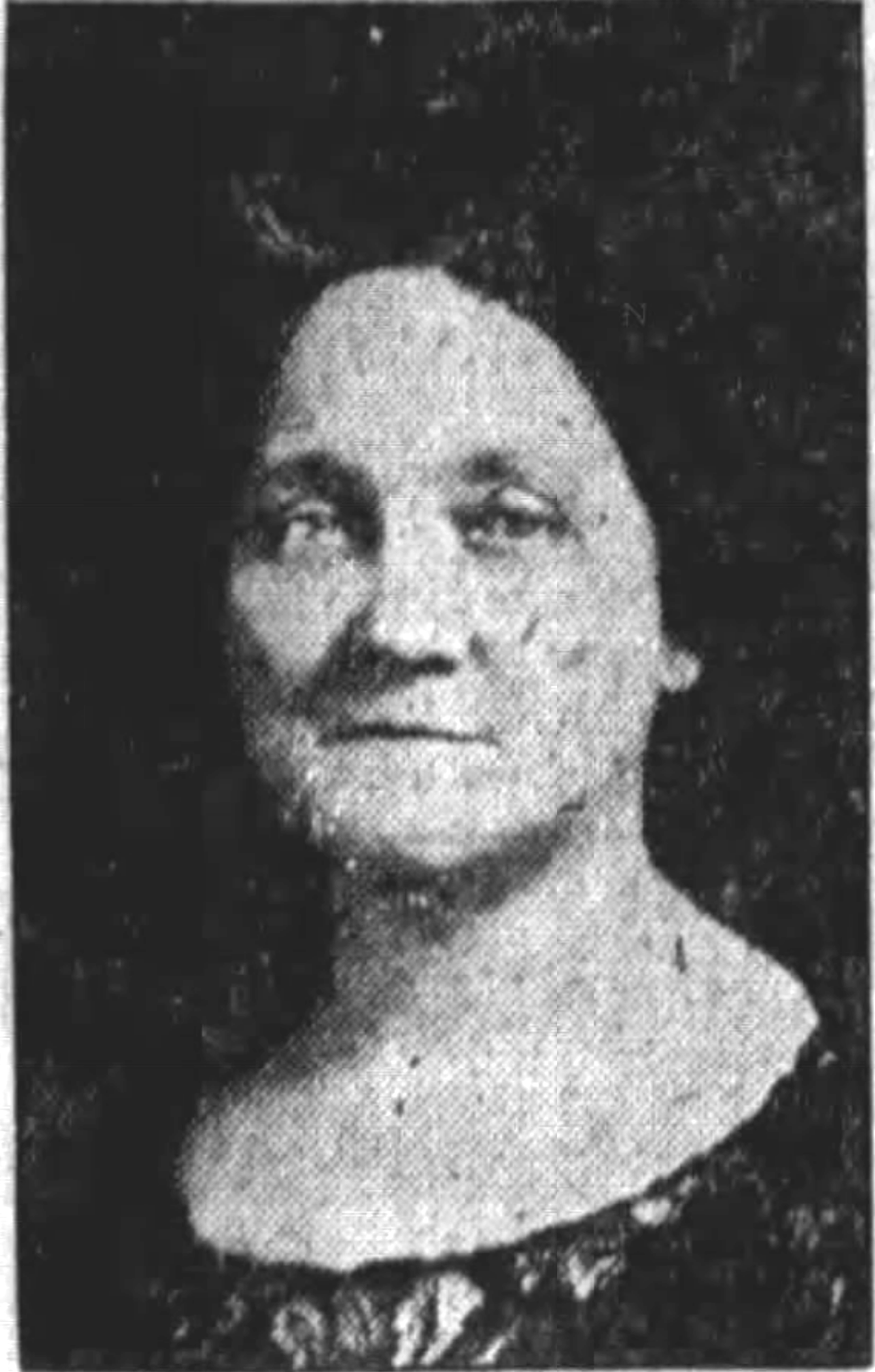
Welch in 1923.

Welch devoted practically her entire lifetime to the fight against intemperance. When she was fourteen years of age, she joined the Independent Order of Good Templars (IOGT), and two years later she was made superintendent of the local branch of the Loyal Temperance Legion.

In 1904, she became a member of the WCTU, and at once took an active part in the work of that organization. She served for 21 years as president of the Sparta WCTU; was appointed as superintendent of the department of Medical Temperance of the Tennessee State WCTU in 1905; became vice-president of the State Union in 1915; and in 1917, was elected State president, in which capacity she served for 28 years.

Welch served as State chair of the Woman's Legislative Council of Tennessee, which was composed of eight State-wide women's organizations, and as chair of the department of narcotics of the State Federation of Women's Clubs. She held several important positions in the women's work of the Presbyterian Church.

During World War I, Welch served as secretary for Tennessee for the [ouncil of Defense's women's division, later receiving a government commendation. Governor Austin Peay appointed Welch to represent the state in an international meeting that was held in 1918 in Toronto, Canada, which studied alcoholism. She was also a delegate to the Democratic National Convention which nominated William Gibbs McAdoo and Al Smith.

Welch was a member of the United Daughters of the Confederacy and the Authors and Artists Club.

== Personal life ==
She married John M. Welch, of Sparta, Tennessee, on June 27, 1893. After residing at Spring City and Sparta, in which two towns her husband was engaged in the wholesale lumber business, the family removed to Chattanooga, in 1924.

Minnie Welch died in Chattanooga, on July 27, 1962, with interment at City Cemetery in Spring City, Tennessee.
