= Lees Station, Tennessee =

Lees Station formerly Lees
- Unincorporated community
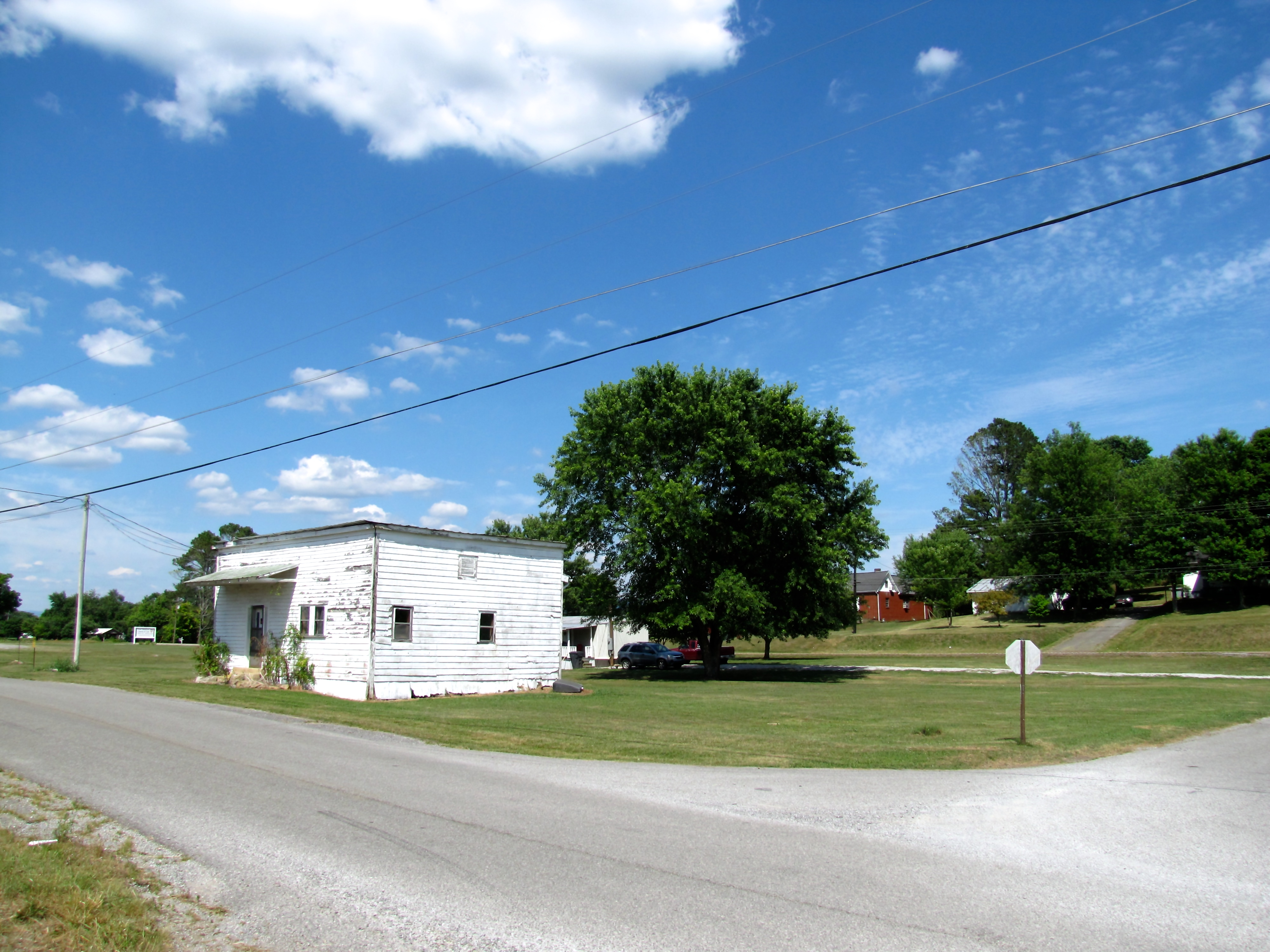

- Location within the state of Tennessee Lees Station (the United States)
- Coordinates: 35°33′27″N 85°15′3″W
- Country: United States
- State: Tennessee
- County: Bledsoe
- Elevation: 846 ft (258 m)
- Time zone: UTC-6 (Central (CST))
  - Summer (DST): UTC-5 (CDT)
- GNIS feature ID: 1290982

Lees Station (also Lee, Lees, or Let) is an unincorporated community in Bledsoe County, Tennessee. It lies along U.S. Route 127 southwest of the city of Pikeville, the county seat of Bledsoe County. Its elevation is 853 feet (260 m), and it is at 35°33′27″N 85°15′3″W (35.5574281, -85.2507964). The various forms of its names led the Board on Geographic Names officially to designate it Lees in 1916. In 1969, the official name was changed to Lees Station.
