= 1988 United States presidential election in Tennessee =

- November 8, 1988

Nominee	George H. W. Bush	Michael Dukakis
Party	Republican	Democratic
Home state	Texas	Massachusetts
Running mate	Dan Quayle	Lloyd Bentsen
Electoral vote	11	0
Popular vote	947,233	679,794
Percentage	57.89%	41.55%

Bush
40–50%
50–60%
60–70%
70–80%
Dukakis
40–50%
50–60%
60–70%
President before election
Ronald Reagan
Republican
Elected President
George H. W. Bush
Republican

The 1988 United States presidential election in Tennessee took place on November 8, 1988. All 50 states and the District of Columbia were part of the 1988 United States presidential election. Tennessee voters chose 11 electors to the Electoral College, which selected the president and vice president. Tennessee was won by incumbent United States Vice President George H. W. Bush of Texas, who was running against Massachusetts Governor Michael Dukakis. Bush ran with Indiana Senator Dan Quayle as Vice President, and Dukakis ran with Texas Senator Lloyd Bentsen.

Tennessee weighed in for this election as eight points more Republican than the national average. Tennessee was the only state that Bush won a higher percentage of the vote and larger margin of victory than Ronald Reagan in 1984, albeit by a difference of less than a tenth of a percent. As of the 2024 presidential election, this was the last time the Republican candidate carried Davidson County (home of Nashville) and Shelby County (home of Memphis), both of which have become staunch, and the only, Democratic strongholds into the 21st century. Hardeman County, Tennessee would not vote for a Republican again until the 2016 United States presidential election.

== Background ==
The Republican presidential nominee had won Tennessee in every presidential election since 1968 except for Democratic nominee Jimmy Carter's victory in 1976.

However, Republican victories in the senatorial elections of 1966 and 1970 were undone by Democratic victories in 1976 and 1984. Ned McWherter's victory in 1986 gubernatorial election also restored Democratic control since 1974. Voter identification among the Democrats fell from 42% to 32% between 1981 and 1985, while identification among the Republicans rose from 25 to 29%.

== Campaign ==
=== Primary ===
U.S. Senator Al Gore, a favorite son, won Tennessee in the Democratic primary with 72% of the vote. Gore won 87% of the white vote. The racial composition of the primary was 73% white and 27% black.

Bill Brock, a former member of the U.S. Senate from Tennessee, served as the chair of Bob Dole's national campaign. McWherter served as the chair of Gore's campaign in the south. 37% of white voters participated in the Republican primary.

=== General ===
The regional political divide in Tennessee between the Republican eastern half and Democratic western half dated back to the American Civil War. Stephanie Chivers, the director of Bush's campaign in the state, stated that they needed a 125,000 margin of victory in the eastern part of the state to counteract Democratic support in the rest of the state. Both of Bush's visits in the state were in Democratic areas in order for him to be "in there with the Reagan/McWherter Democrats" according to Chivers. Quayle's five visits to the state were in the east.

Peter Goelz, a Democratic politician from Kansas City, was selected to be the political director of Dukakis's campaign in the state. He did not arrive until August and he lacked knowledge about the state's politics. Chip Forrester, the executive director of the Tennessee Democratic Party, criticized Dukakis for not utilizing McWherter during the campaign despite his popularity in rural counties. McWherter and other southern governors filmed an endorsement of Dukakis at the National Governors' Conference meeting, but it was never aired on television in Tennessee.

Among white voters, 65% supported Bush while 34% supported Dukakis. Bush received 65% of the vote in the east, 55% in the middle, and 53% in the west. Bush won 73 of the state's 95 counties, including the four most populous counties of Shelby, Davidson, Knox, and Hamilton. Dukakis failed to win any metropolitan areas. Incumbent Democratic U.S. Senator Jim Sasser won reelection in the concurrent senatorial election and the Democrats maintained their control of the Tennessee General Assembly despite Bush's victory.

=== Polling ===
Poll source	Date(s) administered	Sample size	Margin of error	George Bush Republican	Michael Dukakis Democratic	Other / Undecided
Mason-Dixon Polling & Strategy	October 3–5, 1988	829 RV		46%	41%	13%
Mason-Dixon Polling & Strategy	October 26–28, 1988	813 LV		51%	41%	8%

== Results ==
1988 United States presidential election in Tennessee
Party	Candidate	Votes	Percentage	Electoral votes
Republican	George H. W. Bush	947,233	57.89%	11
Democratic	Michael Dukakis	679,794	41.55%	0
Independent	Ron Paul	2,041	0.12%	0
Independent	David Duke	1,807	0.11%	0
Independent	Earl Dodge	1,807	0.11%	0
Independent	Lenora Fulani	1,334	0.08%	0
Independent	Lyndon LaRouche	873	0.05%	0
Independent	James Warren	718	0.04%	0
Independent	Willa Kenoyer	358	0.02%	0
Write-Ins		285	0.02%	0
Totals		1,636,250	100.0%	11

=== Results by county ===
County	George H. W. Bush Republican		Michael Dukakis Democratic		Ron Paul Independent		David Duke Independent		Margin		Total votes cast
County	#	%	#	%	#	%	#	%	#	%	Total votes cast
Anderson	15,056	60.74%	9,589	38.68%	35	0.14%	108	0.44%	5,467	22.06%	24,788
Bedford	4,856	54.32%	4,046	45.26%	9	0.10%	28	0.31%	810	9.06%	8,939
Benton	2,167	43.26%	2,826	56.42%	1	0.02%	15	0.30%	-659	-13.16%	5,009
Bledsoe	1,858	58.48%	1,274	40.10%	5	0.16%	40	1.26%	584	18.38%	3,177
Blount	20,027	67.26%	9,602	32.25%	38	0.13%	109	0.37%	10,425	35.01%	29,776
Bradley	15,829	71.85%	6,122	27.79%	16	0.07%	64	0.29%	9,707	44.06%	22,031
Campbell	5,197	55.19%	4,188	44.48%	5	0.05%	26	0.28%	1,009	10.71%	9,416
Cannon	1,604	47.91%	1,726	51.55%	4	0.12%	14	0.42%	-122	-3.64%	3,348
Carroll	5,635	57.32%	4,151	42.23%	3	0.03%	41	0.42%	1,484	15.09%	9,830
Carter	12,036	71.74%	4,634	27.62%	18	0.11%	90	0.54%	7,402	44.12%	16,778
Cheatham	4,132	56.99%	3,067	42.30%	15	0.21%	36	0.50%	1,065	14.69%	7,250
Chester	2,781	61.05%	1,757	38.57%	2	0.04%	15	0.33%	1,024	22.48%	4,555
Claiborne	4,071	57.48%	2,977	42.04%	6	0.08%	28	0.40%	1,094	15.44%	7,082
Clay	1,291	51.78%	1,183	47.45%	19	0.76%	0	0.00%	108	4.33%	2,493
Cocke	5,430	71.65%	2,115	27.91%	9	0.12%	25	0.33%	3,315	43.74%	7,579
Coffee	7,837	57.56%	5,686	41.76%	29	0.21%	63	0.46%	2,151	15.80%	13,615
Crockett	2,214	55.77%	1,742	43.88%	14	0.35%	0	0.00%	472	11.89%	3,970
Cumberland	7,557	65.18%	3,964	34.19%	22	0.19%	51	0.44%	3,593	30.99%	11,594
Davidson	98,599	52.18%	89,270	47.25%	299	0.16%	778	0.41%	9,329	4.93%	188,946
Decatur	2,286	54.55%	1,880	44.86%	7	0.17%	18	0.43%	406	9.69%	4,191
DeKalb	2,098	45.80%	2,452	53.53%	6	0.13%	25	0.55%	-354	-7.73%	4,581
Dickson	5,343	50.71%	5,129	48.68%	13	0.12%	51	0.48%	214	2.03%	10,536
Dyer	6,508	63.54%	3,690	36.02%	5	0.05%	40	0.39%	2,818	27.52%	10,243
Fayette	3,573	51.63%	3,292	47.57%	11	0.16%	45	0.65%	281	4.06%	6,921
Fentress	3,103	62.16%	1,856	37.18%	2	0.04%	31	0.62%	1,247	24.98%	4,992
Franklin	5,381	49.43%	5,442	49.99%	16	0.15%	47	0.43%	-61	-0.56%	10,886
Gibson	8,415	52.47%	7,542	47.03%	16	0.10%	65	0.41%	873	5.44%	16,038
Giles	3,518	47.04%	3,918	52.39%	10	0.13%	32	0.43%	-400	-5.35%	7,478
Grainger	2,734	65.50%	1,423	34.09%	5	0.12%	12	0.29%	1,311	31.41%	4,174
Greene	11,947	69.73%	5,077	29.63%	44	0.26%	64	0.37%	6,870	40.10%	17,132
Grundy	1,429	37.05%	2,415	62.61%	13	0.34%	0	0.00%	-986	-25.56%	3,857
Hamblen	10,418	66.93%	5,061	32.52%	27	0.17%	59	0.38%	5,357	34.41%	15,565
Hamilton	68,111	62.08%	40,990	37.36%	157	0.14%	451	0.41%	27,121	24.72%	109,709
Hancock	1,303	62.58%	737	35.40%	8	0.38%	34	1.63%	566	27.18%	2,082
Hardeman	3,547	49.69%	3,526	49.40%	13	0.18%	52	0.73%	21	0.29%	7,138
Hardin	4,252	59.98%	2,808	39.61%	5	0.07%	24	0.34%	1,444	20.37%	7,089
Hawkins	9,356	63.88%	5,212	35.59%	24	0.16%	54	0.37%	4,144	28.29%	14,646
Haywood	2,687	47.64%	2,923	51.83%	3	0.05%	27	0.48%	-236	-4.19%	5,640
Henderson	5,418	69.29%	2,296	29.36%	21	0.27%	84	1.07%	3,122	39.93%	7,819
Henry	4,784	47.96%	5,138	51.51%	3	0.03%	50	0.50%	-354	-3.55%	9,975
Hickman	2,246	45.67%	2,643	53.74%	14	0.28%	15	0.31%	-397	-8.07%	4,918
Houston	882	37.26%	1,467	61.98%	4	0.17%	14	0.59%	-585	-24.72%	2,367
Humphreys	2,132	41.09%	3,037	58.54%	1	0.02%	18	0.35%	-905	-17.45%	5,188
Jackson	1,168	37.15%	1,962	62.40%	5	0.16%	9	0.29%	-794	-25.25%	3,144
Jefferson	6,832	67.85%	3,168	31.46%	13	0.13%	56	0.56%	3,664	36.39%	10,069
Johnson	3,715	73.14%	1,329	26.17%	3	0.06%	32	0.63%	2,386	46.97%	5,079
Knox	73,092	63.27%	41,829	36.21%	190	0.16%	410	0.35%	31,263	27.06%	115,521
Lake	806	46.06%	935	53.43%	1	0.06%	8	0.46%	-129	-7.37%	1,750
Lauderdale	3,308	49.83%	3,296	49.65%	4	0.06%	31	0.47%	12	0.18%	6,639
Lawrence	6,273	56.09%	4,903	43.84%	7	0.06%	0	0.00%	1,370	12.25%	11,183
Lewis	1,324	47.95%	1,419	51.39%	8	0.29%	10	0.36%	-95	-3.44%	2,761
Lincoln	4,288	53.49%	3,672	45.80%	21	0.26%	36	0.45%	616	7.69%	8,017
Loudon	7,122	66.69%	3,480	32.59%	14	0.13%	63	0.59%	3,642	34.10%	10,679
Macon	2,962	65.37%	1,538	33.94%	5	0.11%	26	0.57%	1,424	31.43%	4,531
Madison	16,952	60.46%	11,001	39.23%	3	0.01%	83	0.30%	5,951	21.23%	28,039
Marion	4,407	51.14%	4,175	48.45%	6	0.07%	30	0.35%	232	2.69%	8,618
Marshall	2,975	51.37%	2,795	48.26%	2	0.03%	19	0.33%	180	3.11%	5,791
Maury	8,397	56.78%	6,280	42.47%	11	0.07%	100	0.68%	2,117	14.31%	14,788
McMinn	8,462	64.70%	4,568	34.93%	19	0.15%	29	0.22%	3,894	29.77%	13,078
McNairy	4,625	56.46%	3,510	42.85%	10	0.12%	46	0.56%	1,115	13.61%	8,191
Meigs	1,507	58.68%	1,048	40.81%	2	0.08%	11	0.43%	459	17.87%	2,568
Monroe	6,355	61.15%	4,000	38.49%	9	0.09%	29	0.28%	2,355	22.66%	10,393
Montgomery	12,599	57.65%	9,145	41.84%	24	0.11%	88	0.40%	3,454	15.81%	21,856
Moore	786	51.37%	731	47.78%	3	0.20%	10	0.65%	55	3.59%	1,530
Morgan	2,576	56.67%	1,941	42.70%	2	0.04%	27	0.59%	635	13.97%	4,546
Obion	6,037	55.60%	4,785	44.07%	8	0.07%	28	0.26%	1,252	11.53%	10,858
Overton	1,873	42.60%	2,511	57.11%	1	0.02%	12	0.27%	-638	-14.51%	4,397
Perry	854	41.14%	1,208	58.19%	3	0.14%	11	0.53%	-354	-17.05%	2,076
Pickett	1,118	63.67%	634	36.10%	4	0.23%	0	0.00%	484	27.57%	1,756
Polk	2,297	52.31%	2,073	47.21%	3	0.07%	18	0.41%	224	5.10%	4,391
Putnam	9,547	58.62%	6,606	40.56%	24	0.15%	108	0.66%	2,941	18.06%	16,285
Rhea	5,144	66.15%	2,595	33.37%	6	0.08%	31	0.40%	2,549	32.78%	7,776
Roane	10,881	62.19%	6,535	37.35%	6	0.03%	75	0.43%	4,346	24.84%	17,497
Robertson	5,714	48.95%	5,884	50.41%	12	0.10%	62	0.53%	-170	-1.46%	11,672
Rutherford	20,397	62.18%	12,245	37.33%	34	0.10%	125	0.38%	8,152	24.85%	32,801
Scott	2,562	61.10%	1,611	38.42%	3	0.07%	17	0.41%	951	22.68%	4,193
Sequatchie	1,659	57.83%	1,196	41.69%	2	0.07%	12	0.42%	463	16.14%	2,869
Sevier	11,920	76.26%	3,643	23.31%	13	0.08%	55	0.35%	8,277	52.95%	15,631
Shelby	157,457	50.96%	149,759	48.47%	375	0.12%	1,397	0.45%	7,698	2.49%	308,988
Smith	2,138	45.63%	2,522	53.82%	2	0.04%	24	0.51%	-384	-8.19%	4,686
Stewart	1,302	39.50%	1,979	60.04%	2	0.06%	13	0.39%	-677	-20.54%	3,296
Sullivan	32,996	64.73%	17,396	34.13%	33	0.06%	552	1.08%	15,600	30.60%	50,977
Sumner	19,523	62.20%	11,702	37.28%	41	0.13%	123	0.39%	7,821	24.92%	31,389
Tipton	6,052	61.02%	3,824	38.56%	6	0.06%	36	0.36%	2,228	22.46%	9,918
Trousdale	969	44.59%	1,193	54.90%	1	0.05%	10	0.46%	-224	-10.31%	2,173
Unicoi	3,664	66.79%	1,794	32.70%	5	0.09%	23	0.42%	1,870	34.09%	5,486
Union	2,110	59.20%	1,431	40.15%	3	0.08%	20	0.56%	679	19.05%	3,564
Van Buren	780	49.37%	796	50.38%	4	0.25%	0	0.00%	-16	-1.01%	1,580
Warren	4,529	49.13%	4,646	50.40%	5	0.05%	38	0.41%	-117	-1.27%	9,218
Washington	19,615	65.63%	10,087	33.75%	63	0.21%	122	0.41%	9,528	31.88%	29,887
Wayne	3,405	68.77%	1,516	30.62%	3	0.06%	27	0.55%	1,889	38.15%	4,951
Weakley	5,701	57.07%	4,239	42.44%	15	0.15%	34	0.34%	1,462	14.63%	9,989
White	2,646	50.41%	2,562	48.81%	10	0.19%	31	0.59%	84	1.60%	5,249
Williamson	20,847	72.33%	7,864	27.28%	52	0.18%	60	0.21%	12,983	45.05%	28,823
Wilson	13,317	61.11%	8,360	38.36%	24	0.11%	92	0.42%	4,957	22.75%	21,793
Totals	947,233	57.89%	679,794	41.55%	2,041	0.12%	1,807	0.11%	267,439	16.34%	1,636,250

==== Counties that flipped from Republican to Democratic ====
- Giles
- Lewis

==== Counties that flipped from Democratic to Republican ====
- Hardeman
- Lincoln
- White

== Analysis ==
Most counties in Tennessee turned out for Bush, including the highly populated Shelby County and Davidson County, by narrow margins. Those two counties have never voted Republican since this election.

Tennessee was the only state that Bush improved on Ronald Reagan’s 1984 vote share within, although only by 0.05%. He became only the second Republican after Richard Nixon in 1972 to carry Lincoln County and Hardeman County.

== See also ==
- 1988 United States Senate election in Tennessee
- 1988 United States House of Representatives elections in Tennessee
- United States presidential elections in Tennessee
- Presidency of George H. W. Bush

== Works cited ==
- Black, Earl; Black, Merle (1992). The Vital South: How Presidents Are Elected. Harvard University Press. ISBN 0674941306.
- Moreland, Laurence; Steed, Robert; Baker, Tod, eds. (1991). The 1988 Presidential Election in the South: Continuity Amidst Change in Southern Party Politics. Praeger Publishers. ISBN 0275931455.
