= New Harmony, Tennessee =

New Harmony
- Unincorporated community
- Location within the state of Tennessee New Harmony (the United States)
- Coordinates: 35°32′44″N 85°7′58″W
- Country: United States
- State: Tennessee
- County: Bledsoe
- Elevation: 1,975 ft (602 m)
- Time zone: UTC-6 (Central (CST))
  - Summer (DST): UTC-5 (CDT)
- GNIS feature ID: 1293581

New Harmony is an unincorporated community in Bledsoe County, Tennessee. It lies in eastern Bledsoe County, south of Summer City and southeast of the city of Pikeville, the county seat of Bledsoe County. New Harmony is located along Tennessee State Route 443 (New Harmony Road).
