= Ogden, Tennessee =

- Unincorporated community
- Location within Tennessee Location within the United States
- Coordinates: 35°30′31″N 85°06′05″W
- Country: United States
- State: Tennessee
- County: Rhea
- Elevation: 1,933 ft (589 m)
- Time zone: UTC-5 (Eastern (EST))
  - Summer (DST): UTC-4 (EDT)
- Area code: 423
- GNIS feature ID: 1315641

Ogden is an unincorporated community in Rhea County, Tennessee, United States. Ogden is located on Tennessee State Route 443 (Ogden Road) 5.1 miles (8.2 km) west of Dayton.

== Education ==
Rhea County Schools is the local school district. The district's sole high school is Rhea County High School.
