= 1988 United States Senate election in Tennessee =

- November 8, 1988
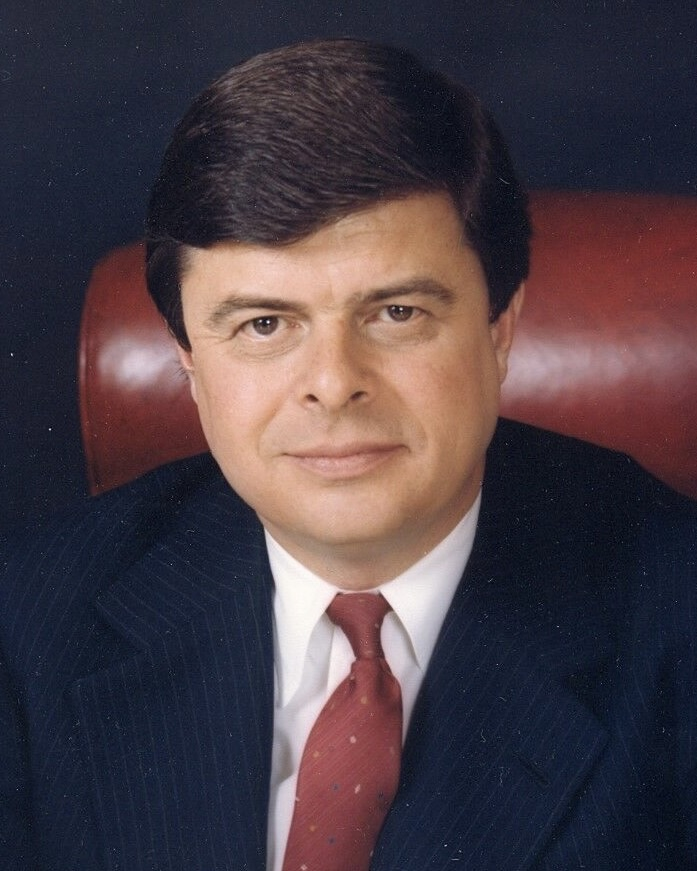

Nominee	Jim Sasser	Bill Andersen
Party	Democratic	Republican
Popular vote	1,020,061	541,033
Percentage	65.09%	34.52%
- County results Sasser: 50–60% 60–70% 70–80% 80–90% Andersen: 50–60%
U.S. senator before election
Jim Sasser
Democratic
Elected U.S. Senator
Jim Sasser
Democratic

The 1988 United States election in Tennessee was held on November 8, 1988. Incumbent Democratic U.S. Senator Jim Sasser won re-election to a third term, defeating Republican nominee Bill Andersen with 65.1% of the vote.

As of 2026, this was the last time the Democrats won the Class 1 Senate seat from Tennessee.

== Major candidates ==
=== Democratic ===
- Jim Sasser, incumbent U.S. Senator since 1977

=== Republican ===
- Bill Andersen, attorney

== Campaign ==
Sasser raised $1.5 million in 1987 to ward off significant opposition according to his aide Doug Hall. Andersen started raising funds for a congressional campaign in 1985, under the belief that U.S. Representative Jimmy Quillen would retire, but Quillen sought reelection. Andersen instead switched to a senatorial campaign.

Sasser declined to acknowledge Andersen's attacks during the campaign and instead focused on his congressional work while his staff responded to the attacks. Andersen called for six televised debates, but Sasser rejected the demand and only accepted one debate in Nashville.

After the election Andersen stated that polling conducted by his campaign reported that "one out of three Tennesseans had not yet identified who I was and what my message means".

Sasser won every county in the state except for two. He received 58% of the vote in the eastern region of the state which is usually Republican, 68% in the middle, and 71% in the west.

== Polling ==
Poll source	Date(s) administered	Sample size	Margin of error	Bill Anderson Republican	Jim Sasser Democratic	Other / Undecided
Mason-Dixon Polling & Strategy	Early October			27%	62%	11%
Mason-Dixon Polling & Strategy	October 26–28, 1988			26%	65%	9%

== Endorsements ==
Bill Andersen

Newspapers

- Chattanooga Times Free Press
Jim Sasser

Newspapers

- Knoxville News Sentinel

== Results ==
1988 United States Senate election in Tennessee
Party	Candidate	Votes	%	±%
Democratic	Jim Sasser (incumbent)	1,020,061	65.09%	
Republican	Bill Andersen	541,033	34.52%	
Independent	Khalil-Ullah Al-Muhaymin	6,042	0.39%	
Independent	Write-ins	45	0.39%	
Total votes		1,567,181	100.00%	

== See also ==
- 1988 United States Senate elections
- 1988 United States presidential election in Tennessee

== Works cited ==
- Moreland, Laurence; Steed, Robert; Baker, Tod, eds. (1991). The 1988 Presidential Election in the South: Continuity Amidst Change in Southern Party Politics. Praeger Publishers. ISBN 0275931455.
- Thomas, Richard, ed. (1989). Federal Election 88: Election Results for U.S. President, the U.S. Senate and the U.S. House of Representatives (PDF). Federal Election Commission. Archived from the original (PDF) on August 15, 2023.
