= Summer City, Tennessee =

Summer City
- Unincorporated community
- Location within the state of Tennessee Summer City (the United States)
- Coordinates: 35°34′27″N 85°6′58″W
- Country: United States
- State: Tennessee
- County: Bledsoe
- Elevation: 1,965 ft (599 m)
- Time zone: UTC-6 (Central (CST))
  - Summer (DST): UTC-5 (CDT)
- GNIS feature ID: 1293581

Summer City is an unincorporated community that sits on the border of Bledsoe County, and Rhea County, Tennessee, United States. It lies between the cities of Pikeville (the county seat of Bledsoe County) and Dayton (The county seat of Rhea County), at the intersection of Tennessee State Route 30 and Tennessee State Route 443 (New Harmony Road).
