= Reliance, Tennessee =

- Unincorporated community
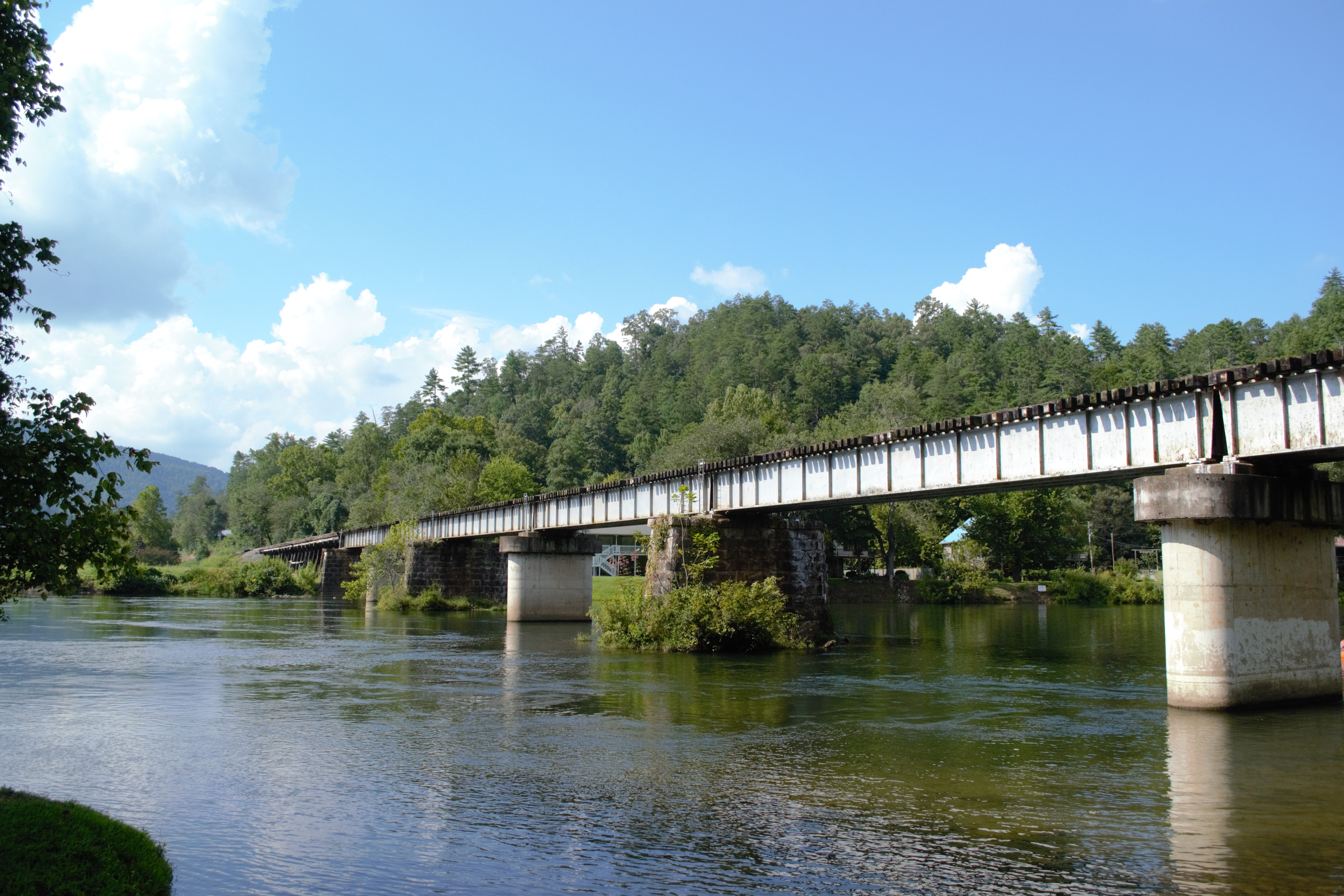
- Knoxville Southern Railroad Bridge over the Hiwassee River in Reliance.

- Location within Tennessee Location within the United States
- Coordinates: 35°11′13″N 84°29′57″W
- Country: United States
- State: Tennessee
- County: Polk
- Elevation: 778 ft (237 m)
- Time zone: UTC-5 (Eastern (EST))
  - Summer (DST): UTC-4 (EDT)
- ZIP code: 37369
- Area code: 423
- GNIS feature ID: 1639568
- Reliance Historic District
- U.S. National Register of Historic Places
- U.S. Historic district
- Location: Polk County, Tennessee, United States
- NRHP reference No.: 86000350
- Added to NRHP: March 13, 1986

Reliance is an unincorporated community in Polk County, Tennessee, United States. Reliance is located on the Hiwassee River at the junction of Tennessee State Route 30 and Tennessee State Route 315, 8.8 miles (14.2 km) east of Benton. Reliance had a post office until it closed on May 21, 2011; it still has its own ZIP code, 37369. The ZIP code tabulation area had a population of 916 as of the 2020 census.

== History ==
The Reliance Historic District was placed on the National Register of Historic Places in 1986. The district includes the Vaughn-Webb House, Higdon Hotel, Watchman's House, Hiwassee Union Church and Masonic Lodge, and Webb Brothers' Store.

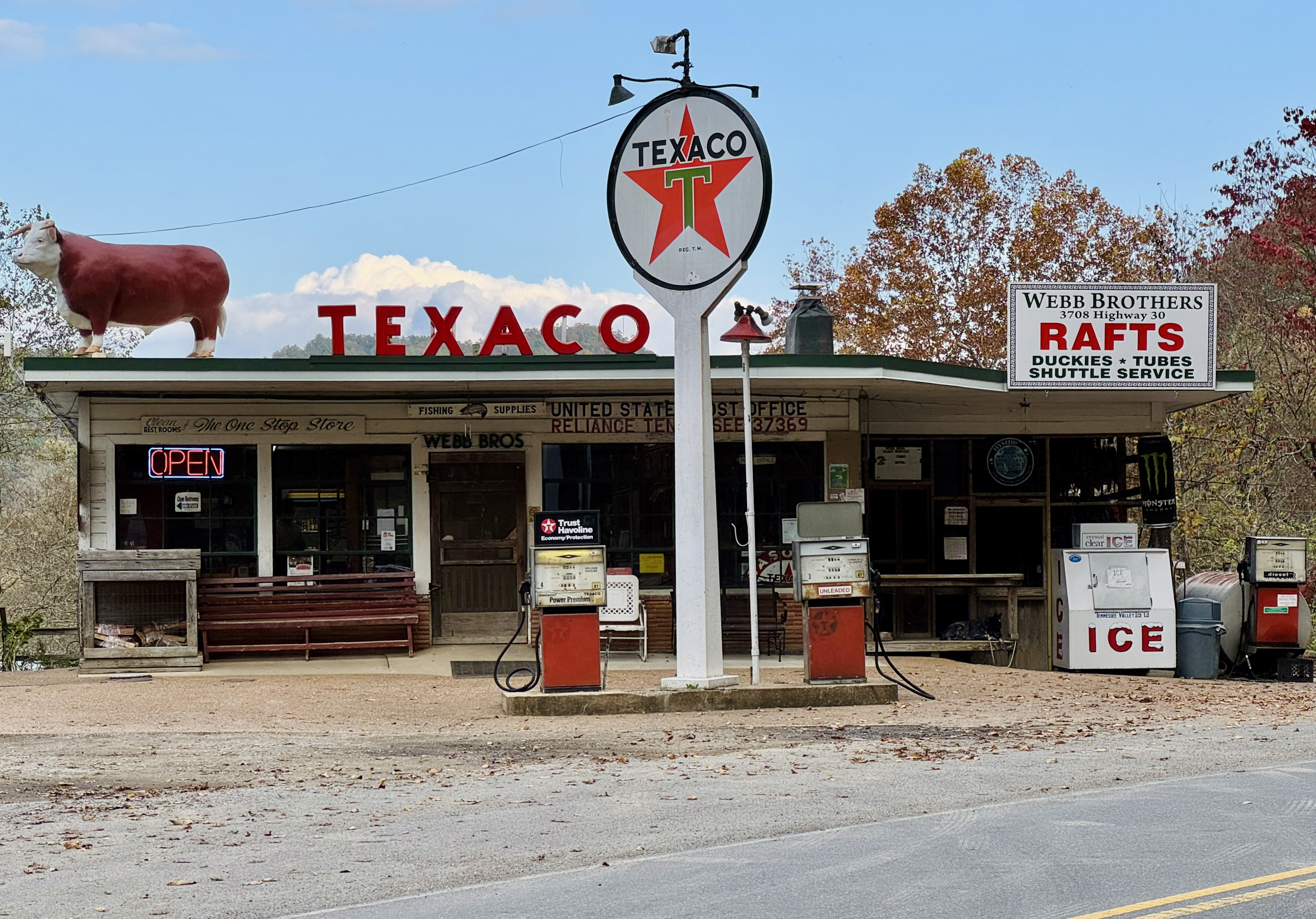
Webb Brothers' Store in Reliance, Tennessee.

The community developed in the latter 19th century when a water-powered grist mill and sawmill were constructed along the river. The railroad was constructed in the late 1880s, providing rail access to the Copper Basin. A ferry began operation in the center of the community east of the railroad around the same time. This ferry was replaced by a one-lane truss bridge in 1912; this bridge, located within the historic district, was subsequently replaced in 1992, and is now designated as part of SR 315.

A home constructed on the north side of the river in 1878 was expanded into the Higdon Hotel in 1890, initially providing housing for the railroad workers. It continued to operate until the 1930s when passenger trains through the area ceased. Constructed in 1888, the Vaughn-Webb House is a historic home which still remains. The Watchman's House, built in 1891 on the north side of the river, was originally occupied by a railroad watchman, whose job was to watch to ensure trains crossing the bridge over the Hiwassee did not set fire to the bridge. The Hiwassee Union Church and Masonic Lodge was constructed in the community in 1899, and also served as a school. A post office operated in the community between 1879 and 2003. It did not officially close until 2011.
