= Jalapa, Tennessee =

Community in Tennessee, US

Coordinates: 35°20′39″N 84°21′43″W

Jalapa was a very small, rural community in Monroe County, Tennessee, United States, approximately five miles (8 km) south (on Mecca Pike) of Tellico Plains. Located in the Unicoi Mountains (a section of the Blue Ridge), this southeast Tennessee settlement is now considered by the Post Office to be part of greater Tellico Plains.

It is uncertain as to how the community got its name (a name which is no longer used, for the most part). There is some conjecture that it might have come from a Cherokee word, or perhaps from a mispronunciation of Jalapa, Mexico (perhaps brought back by a Mexican War veteran). Today, Jalapa is locally referred to as Rural Vale.

It is pronounced by locals as "juh-lap-ee," which may have some indication on the name's provenance.

== Notable people ==
- Annie Law (1842–1889), taught school in Jalapa from about 1871 to 1872

== Bibliography ==
=== Sources ===
- Maryville College Monthly.
1. Branner, John Casper (1850–1922) (December 1908). "Annie Law and Fannie Law Andrews". Vol. 11, no. 2.
  1. Via Online Archive of California (OAC) (Dr. James Lewis; 1822–1881, lived in Mohawk, New York). James Lewis Letters, M0108, Department of Special Collections, Stanford University Libraries.
