= Mount Crest, Tennessee =

Mount Crest
- Unincorporated community
- Location within the state of Tennessee Mount Crest (the United States)
- Coordinates: 35°40′11″N 85°14′24″W
- Country: United States
- State: Tennessee
- County: Bledsoe
- Elevation: 1,722 ft (525 m)
- Time zone: UTC-6 (Central (CST))
  - Summer (DST): UTC-5 (CDT)
- GNIS feature ID: 1315545

Mount Crest is an unincorporated community in Bledsoe County, Tennessee. It lies along State Route 30 northwest of the city of Pikeville, the county seat of Bledsoe County.
