= Bledsoe County, Tennessee =

County in Tennessee, United States

- County
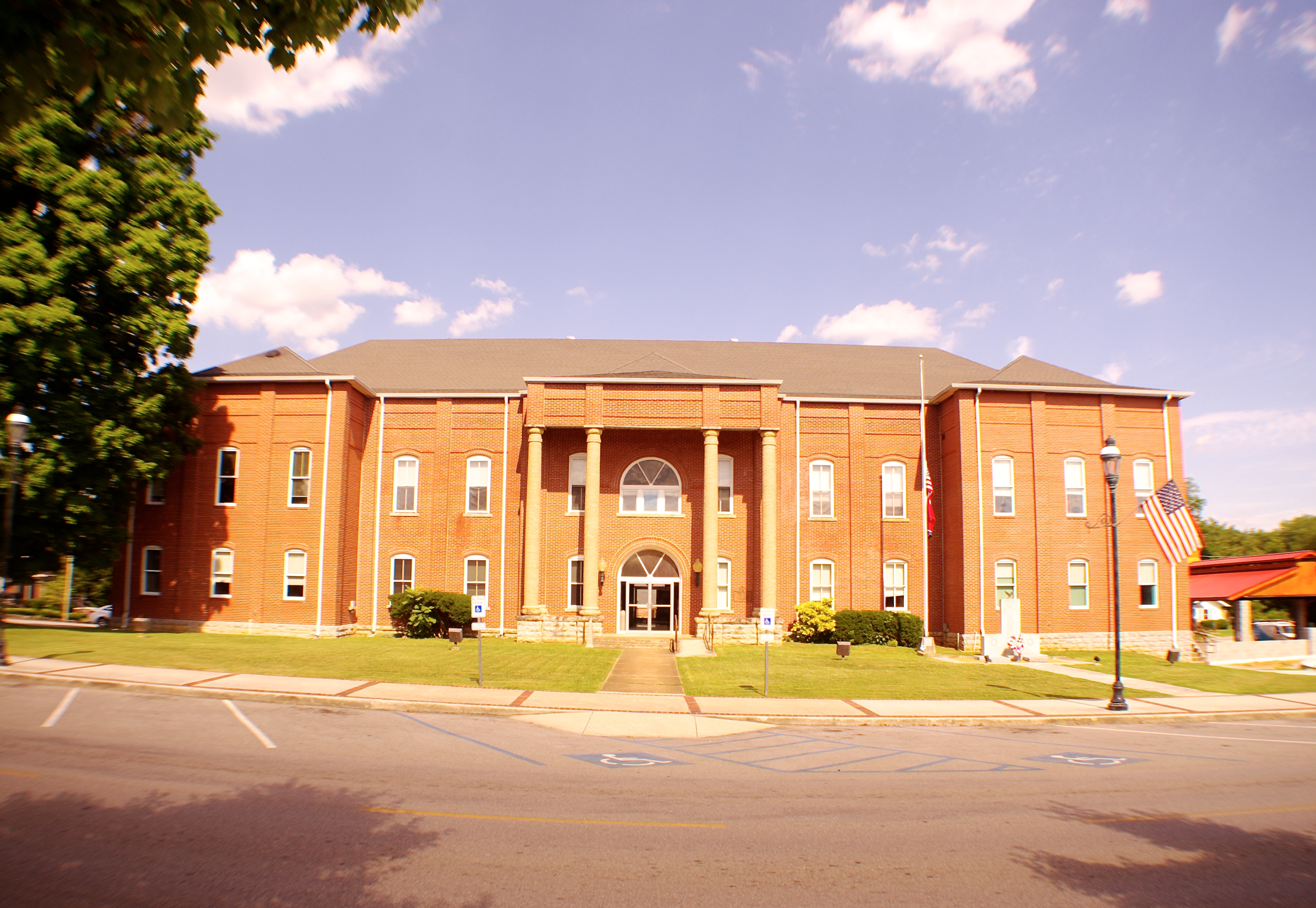
- Bledsoe County Courthouse in Pikeville

- Seal

- Location within the U.S. state of Tennessee
- Coordinates: 35°36′N 85°13′W
- Country: United States
- State: Tennessee
- Founded: 1807
- Named for: Anthony Bledsoe
- Seat: Pikeville
- Largest city: Pikeville

Area
  - Total: 407 sq mi (1,050 km^{2})
  - Land: 406 sq mi (1,050 km^{2})
  - Water: 0.3 sq mi (0.78 km^{2}) 0.08%

Population (2020)
  - Total: 14,913
  - Estimate (2025): 15,920 ▲
  - Density: 36.73/sq mi (14.18/km^{2})
- Time zone: UTC−6 (Central)
  - Summer (DST): UTC−5 (CDT)
- Congressional district: 4th
- Website: https://bledsoetn.com/

Bledsoe County is a county located in the U.S. state of Tennessee. As of the 2020 census, the population was 14,913. Its county seat is Pikeville.

== History ==
Bledsoe County was formed in 1807 from land that was formerly Cherokee Nation land as well as land carved from Roane County. The county was named for Anthony Bledsoe (1739–1788), a soldier in the Revolutionary War and was an early settler of Sumner County. He was killed in an Indian attack at Bledsoe's Station.

Like many East Tennessee counties, Bledsoe County opposed secession on the eve of the Civil War. In Tennessee's Ordinance of Secession on June 8, 1861, the county's residents voted against secession by a margin of 500 to 197. General James G. Spears, a resident of Bledsoe, served as a vice president at the pro-Union East Tennessee Convention in May and June 1861, and fought for the Union Army in the war.

=== Lynching of James Scales ===
James Scales, a Black teenager, was incarcerated at the Training and Agricultural School for Colored Boys in Bledsoe County after he was convicted for armed robbery. At the reformatory, James was tasked with cooking and building fires for the Superintendent Henry Eugene Scott's family, namely his wife Notie Bell Lewis Scott and their daughter Gwendolyn Scott McKinney, whose home resided on the grounds of the reformatory.

On November 23, 1944, McKinney was found murdered and her mother severely injured, later dying of her injuries. Scales was immediately suspected of the double murder. He was found later in the day by farmers who brought him to the reformatory, where he was later taken to the local jail in Pikeville.

At the local jail Scales was placed in a cell by the jail cook. Construction workers nearby impersonated reformatory personnel and requested Scales be released to them. The jail cook obliged and released Scales.

After Scales was kidnapped, he was taken to the reformatory grounds; at the grounds, a tree had been prepared for a lynching. A barrel was placed beneath the tree for Scales to stand on. A witness to the event attempted to stop the lynching, but Scales was shot 4 to 6 times by a member of the mob, killing him at the age of 16.

== Geography ==
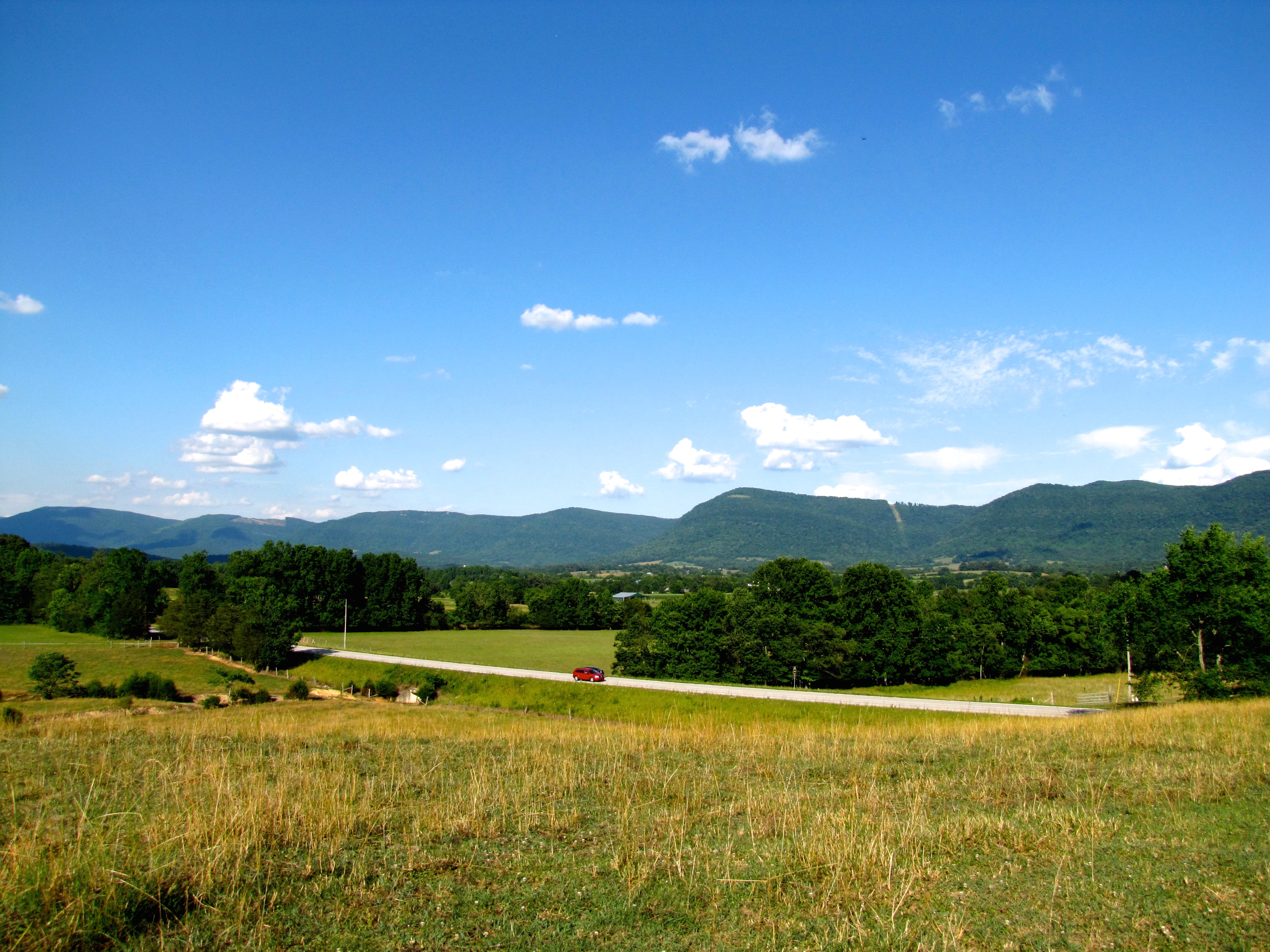
Northern Bledsoe County, with the Cumberland Plateau on the horizon

According to the U.S. Census Bureau, the county has a total area of 407 square miles (1,050 km^{2}), of which 406 square miles (1,050 km^{2}) is land and 0.3 square miles (0.78 km^{2}) (0.08%) is water.

=== Adjacent counties ===
- Cumberland County (north)
- Rhea County (east/EST Border)
- Hamilton County (southeast/EST Border)
- Sequatchie County (southwest)
- Van Buren County (west)

=== State protected areas ===
- Bledsoe State Forest (part)
- Fall Creek Falls State Natural Area (part)
- Fall Creek Falls State Park (part)

== Demographics ==
Historical population
Census	Pop.	Note	%±
1810	3,259		—
1820	4,005		22.9%
1830	4,648		16.1%
1840	5,676		22.1%
1850	5,959		5.0%
1860	4,459		−25.2%
1870	4,870		9.2%
1880	5,617		15.3%
1890	6,134		9.2%
1900	6,626		8.0%
1910	6,329		−4.5%
1920	7,218		14.0%
1930	7,128		−1.2%
1940	8,358		17.3%
1950	8,561		2.4%
1960	7,811		−8.8%
1970	7,643		−2.2%
1980	9,478		24.0%
1990	9,669		2.0%
2000	12,367		27.9%
2010	12,876		4.1%
2020	14,913		15.8%
2025 (est.)	15,920	▲	6.8%
U.S. Decennial Census; 1790-1960 1900-1990; 1990-2000 2010-2020

=== Racial and ethnic composition ===
Bledsoe County, Tennessee – Racial and ethnic composition Note: the US Census treats Hispanic/Latino as an ethnic category. This table excludes Latinos from the racial categories and assigns them to a separate category. Hispanics/Latinos may be of any race.
Race / ethnicity (NH = Non-Hispanic)	Pop 1980	Pop 1990	Pop 2000	Pop 2010	Pop 2020	% 1980	% 1990	% 2000	% 2010	% 2020
White alone (NH)	9,050	9,213	11,583	11,936	13,129	95.48%	95.28%	93.66%	92.70%	88.04%
Black or African American alone (NH)	320	373	454	469	781	3.38%	3.86%	3.67%	3.64%	5.24%
Native American or Alaska Native alone (NH)	8	42	45	52	48	0.08%	0.43%	0.36%	0.40%	0.32%
Asian alone (NH)	10	3	14	17	37	0.11%	0.03%	0.11%	0.13%	0.25%
Native Hawaiian or Pacific Islander alone (NH)	x	x	3	3	0	x	x	0.02%	0.02%	0.00%
Other race alone (NH)	0	0	3	5	2	0.00%	0.00%	0.02%	0.04%	0.01%
Mixed race or Multiracial (NH)	x	x	127	139	457	x	x	1.03%	1.08%	3.06%
Hispanic or Latino (any race)	90	38	138	255	459	0.95%	0.39%	1.12%	1.98%	3.08%
Total	9,478	9,669	12,367	12,876	14,913	100.00%	100.00%	100.00%	100.00%	100.00%

=== 2020 census ===
As of the 2020 census, there were 14,913 people, 5,039 households, and 3,473 families residing in the county.

The median age was 43.7 years; 17.5% of residents were under the age of 18 and 18.6% of residents were 65 years of age or older. For every 100 females there were 132.0 males, and for every 100 females age 18 and over there were 136.3 males age 18 and over.

The racial makeup of the county was 88.9% White, 5.3% Black or African American, 0.5% American Indian and Alaska Native, 0.3% Asian, <0.1% Native Hawaiian and Pacific Islander, 1.3% from some other race, and 3.8% from two or more races. Hispanic or Latino residents of any race comprised 3.1% of the population.

<0.1% of residents lived in urban areas, while 100.0% lived in rural areas.

There were 5,039 households in the county, of which 28.1% had children under the age of 18 living in them. Of all households, 51.0% were married-couple households, 19.6% were households with a male householder and no spouse or partner present, and 23.1% were households with a female householder and no spouse or partner present. About 25.6% of all households were made up of individuals and 11.5% had someone living alone who was 65 years of age or older.

There were 5,870 housing units, of which 14.2% were vacant. Among occupied housing units, 76.7% were owner-occupied and 23.3% were renter-occupied. The homeowner vacancy rate was 1.0% and the rental vacancy rate was 8.4%.

=== 2000 census ===
As of the census of 2000, there were 12,367 people, 4,430 households, and 3,313 families residing in the county. The population density was 30 people per square mile (12 people/km^{2}). There were 5,142 housing units at an average density of 13 units per square mile (5.0/km^{2}). The racial makeup of the county was 94.44% White, 3.70% Black or African American, 0.38% Native American, 0.11% Asian, 0.02% Pacific Islander, 0.19% from other races, and 1.15% from two or more races. 1.12% of the population were Hispanic or Latino of any race.

There were 4,430 households, out of which 31.30% had children under the age of 18 living with them, 61.50% were married couples living together, 9.10% had a female householder with no husband present, and 25.20% were non-families. 22.10% of all households were made up of individuals, and 9.20% had someone living alone who was 65 years of age or older. The average household size was 2.53 and the average family size was 2.94.

In the county, the population was spread out, with 23.10% under the age of 18, 8.40% from 18 to 24, 31.30% from 25 to 44, 25.80% from 45 to 64, and 11.40% who were 65 years of age or older. The median age was 37 years. For every 100 females there were 121.00 males. For every 100 females age 18 and over, there were 121.30 males.

The median income for a household in the county was $28,982, and the median income for a family was $34,593. Males had a median income of $26,648 versus $20,639 for females. The per capita income for the county was $13,889. About 14.90% of families and 18.10% of the population were below the poverty line, including 21.00% of those under age 18 and 23.20% of those age 65 or over.

== Recreation ==
Bledsoe County is home to a portion of Fall Creek Falls State Resort Park.

== Prisons ==
Bledsoe County Correctional Complex (BCCX) covers about 2,500 acres between Pikeville and Spencer. The prison is a level 3 facility which houses about 2,539 offenders in three separate facilities: Site 1; Site 2 (formerly Southeast Tennessee State Regional Correctional Facility); and Unit 28 (houses female offenders.)

== Communities ==
=== City ===
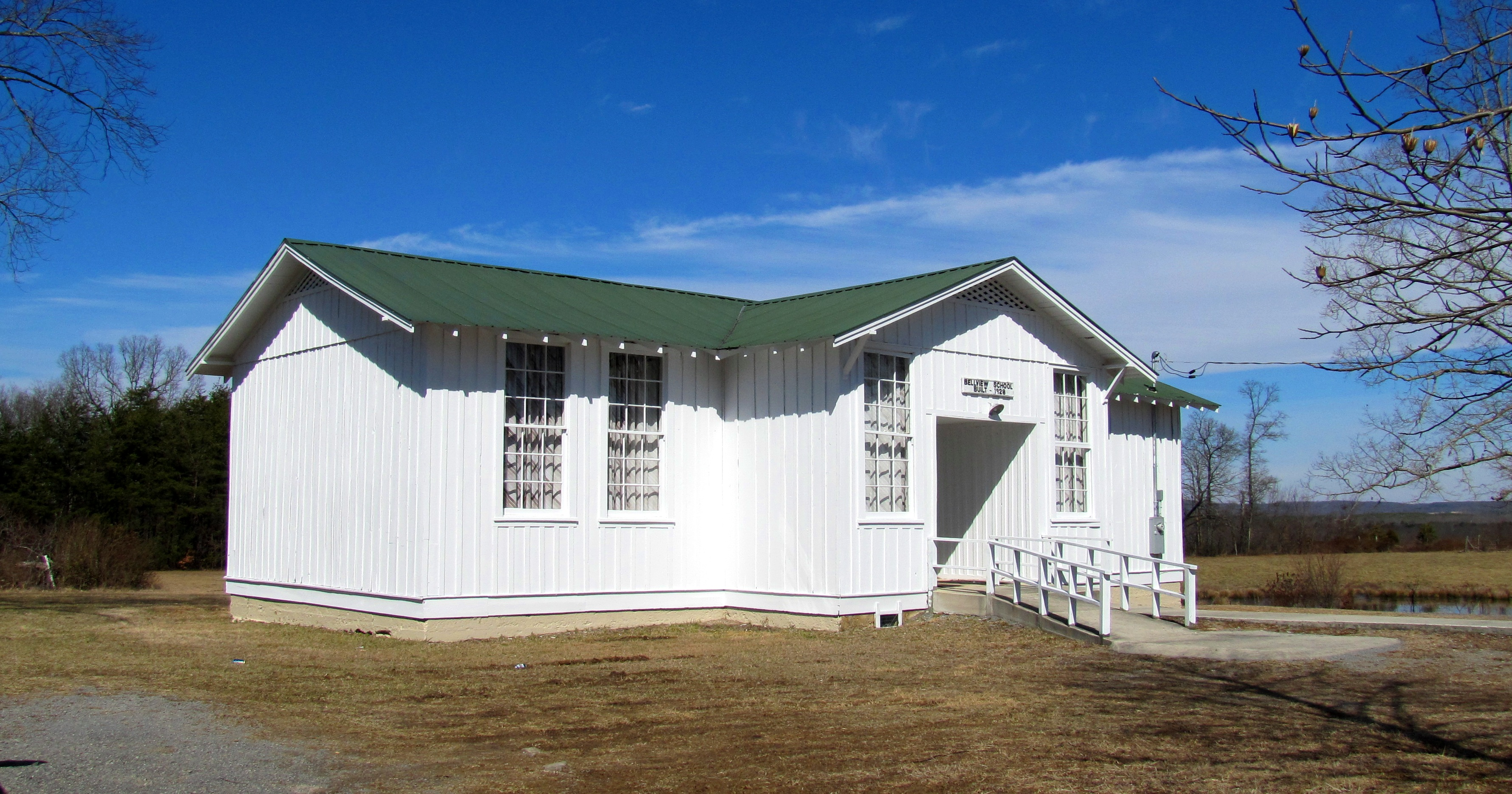
Old Bellview School in northwestern Bledsoe County

- Pikeville (county seat)

=== Unincorporated communities ===
- Cold Spring
- Dill
- Lees Station
- Lusk
- Melvine
- Mount Crest
- New Harmony
- Pailo
- Summer City
- Tiptop

== Politics ==
The last Democrat to carry this county was Bill Clinton in 1992. In 1988, it was one of two counties that didn't vote for Democratic Senator Jim Sasser, but two years later, it backed Governor Ned McWherter.

United States presidential election results for Bledsoe County, Tennessee
Year	Republican		Democratic		Third party(ies)	
Year	No.	%	No.	%	No.	%
1912	379	30.22%	464	37.00%	411	32.78%
1916	681	61.68%	423	38.32%	0	0.00%
1920	1,198	71.31%	482	28.69%	0	0.00%
1924	690	58.28%	485	40.96%	9	0.76%
1928	901	60.11%	598	39.89%	0	0.00%
1932	960	48.14%	1,034	51.86%	0	0.00%
1936	1,178	48.70%	1,218	50.35%	23	0.95%
1940	1,317	46.31%	1,527	53.69%	0	0.00%
1944	1,187	59.89%	795	40.11%	0	0.00%
1948	1,103	49.07%	1,092	48.58%	53	2.36%
1952	1,229	50.85%	1,158	47.91%	30	1.24%
1956	1,429	56.57%	1,079	42.72%	18	0.71%
1960	1,439	58.69%	981	40.01%	32	1.31%
1964	1,431	50.33%	1,412	49.67%	0	0.00%
1968	1,477	46.65%	957	30.23%	732	23.12%
1972	1,952	65.90%	899	30.35%	111	3.75%
1976	1,620	47.63%	1,757	51.66%	24	0.71%
1980	1,970	54.94%	1,585	44.20%	31	0.86%
1984	1,950	59.34%	1,316	40.05%	20	0.61%
1988	1,858	59.04%	1,274	40.48%	15	0.48%
1992	1,776	44.20%	1,884	46.89%	358	8.91%
1996	1,626	46.04%	1,621	45.89%	285	8.07%
2000	2,380	56.72%	1,756	41.85%	60	1.43%
2004	2,849	59.24%	1,927	40.07%	33	0.69%
2008	3,166	66.18%	1,517	31.71%	101	2.11%
2012	3,022	69.33%	1,267	29.07%	70	1.61%
2016	3,622	77.66%	897	19.23%	145	3.11%
2020	4,725	82.06%	971	16.86%	62	1.08%
2024	5,254	84.87%	891	14.39%	46	0.74%

== See also ==
- National Register of Historic Places listings in Bledsoe County, Tennessee
- USS Bledsoe County (LST-356)
