= Riceville, Tennessee =

- Census-designated place
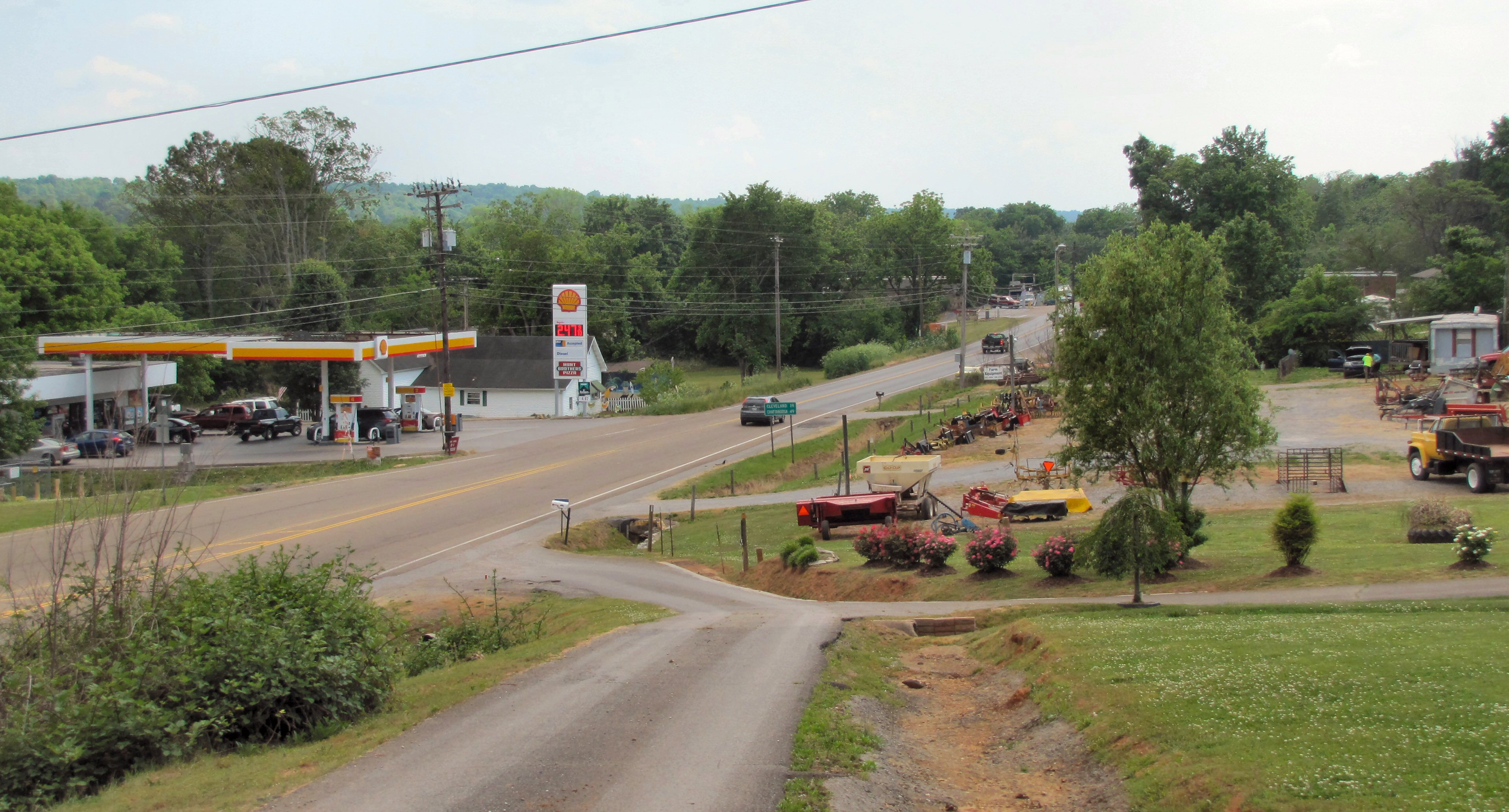

- Location within Tennessee Location within the United States
- Coordinates: 35°23′05″N 84°41′35″W
- Country: United States
- State: Tennessee
- County: McMinn

Area
  - Total: 2.18 sq mi (5.64 km^{2})
  - Land: 2.18 sq mi (5.64 km^{2})
  - Water: 0 sq mi (0.00 km^{2})
- Elevation: 837 ft (255 m)

Population (2020)
  - Total: 688
  - Density: 316.0/sq mi (122.01/km^{2})
- Time zone: UTC-5 (Eastern (EST))
  - Summer (DST): UTC-4 (EDT)
- Postal code: 37371
- Area code: 423
- GNIS feature ID: 1299303

Riceville is an unincorporated community and census-designated place (CDP) in McMinn County, Tennessee, United States. It is located some 60 miles southwest of Knoxville, and midway between Knoxville and Chattanooga, and in closer proximity, between Athens and Calhoun. Its population was 688 as of the 2020 census.

== Demographics ==
Historical population
Census	Pop.	Note	%±
2020	688		—
U.S. Decennial Census

== Education ==
McMinn County Schools operates public schools, including Riceville Elementary School.

== Notable people ==
- Minnie Welch (1871-1962), temperance reformer
