= Englewood, Tennessee =

- Town
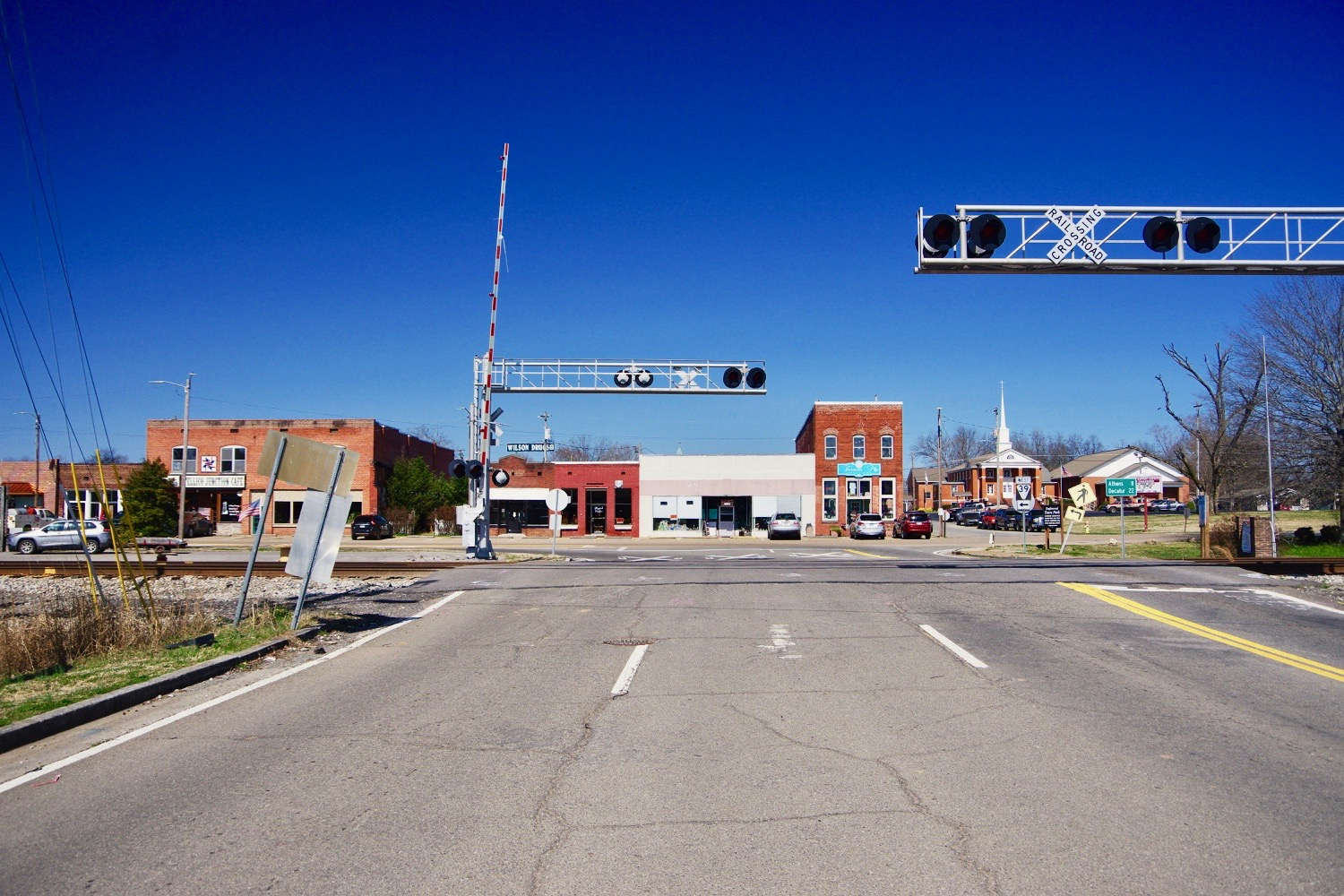
- Main Street (SR 39)

- Location of Englewood in McMinn County, Tennessee.
- Coordinates: 35°25′35″N 84°29′13″W
- Country: United States
- State: Tennessee
- County: McMinn
- Incorporated: 1919
- Named after: Inglewood Forest

Area
  - Total: 1.91 sq mi (4.95 km^{2})
  - Land: 1.91 sq mi (4.95 km^{2})
  - Water: 0 sq mi (0.00 km^{2})
- Elevation: 860 ft (262 m)

Population (2024)
  - Total: 1,483
  - Density: 776.4/sq mi (299.77/km^{2})
- Time zone: UTC-5 (Eastern (EST))
  - Summer (DST): UTC-4 (EDT)
- ZIP code: 37329
- Area code: 423
- FIPS code: 47-24040
- GNIS feature ID: 1283789
- Website: www.townofenglewood.com

Englewood is a town in McMinn County, Tennessee, United States. The population was 1,590 in 2024.

== History ==
In 1857, businessman John Dixon established the Eureka Cotton Mills near what is now Englewood where they used regionally-grown cotton to produce yarn. The small mill community that developed around the mill became known as Eureka Mills. By 1875, Elisha Brient, a partner of Dixon, and several of Brient's relatives had acquired Eureka Cotton Mills, and in 1894 the Brients renamed the town of Eureka Mills "Englewood". The name was suggested by Nancy Chestnutt, a sister-in-law of James Brient, who thought the area resembled the English forests of the Robin Hood tales she had read about as a child.

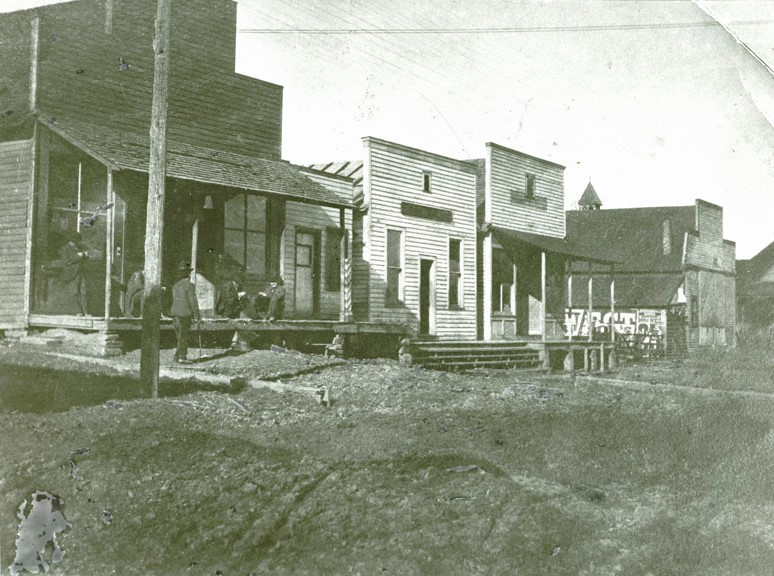
Englewood in 1907

In the late 19th century, the Brients began building shops and gristmills approximately 2 miles (3.2 km) northeast of their milltown at a railroad stop called Tellico Junction, where the Atlanta, Knoxville & Northern Railroad (which roughly followed modern U.S. 411) intersected the Tellico Railroad (which connected Athens and Tellico Plains). The Brients also expanded their Englewood operation, establishing a flour and feed mill in partnership with J.W. Chestnutt. In 1907, the entire Englewood operation was moved to Tellico Junction to take advantage of the railroad. The following year, Tellico Junction was renamed Englewood and the original milltown subsequently became known as "Old Englewood".

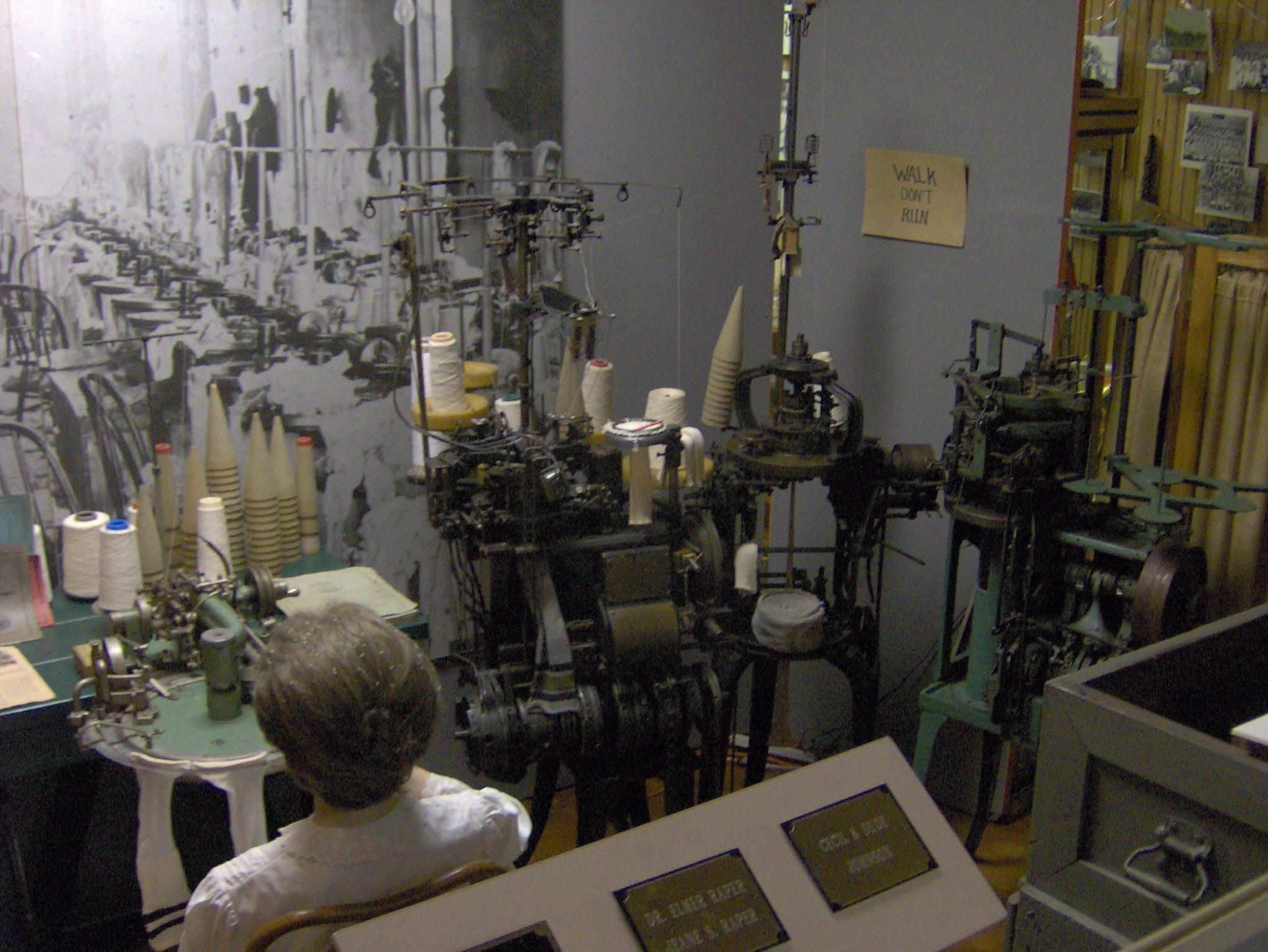
Display at the Englewood Textile Museum

In 1917, Chestnutt formed the Englewood Manufacturing Company, which built a hosiery mill at Englewood. Englewood grew to include housing for 300 workers, and had its own company stores, sawmill, and school. The tenement section associated with the Eureka Cotton Mill became known as "Yellow Top", the section associated with the hosiery mill became known as "Socktown", and the section associated with the flour mill was called "Onion Hill". Women worked at the mills in large numbers, mainly as weavers, while most supervisory positions were held by men.

During the Great Depression, the Englewood mills were forced to close, and many of the town's residents joined various federal work programs. During World War II, the Eureka Cotton Mill was refurbished by the United National Clothing Center, which made clothing for donations to wartorn countries. Several mills and factories established operations at Englewood over subsequent decades, but most had shut down by the late 1990s. The last of the Englewood mills, Allied Hosiery, closed its doors in 2008. The Englewood Textile Museum, near the corner of Niota Street and Main Street, interprets the town's manufacturing history.

== Geography ==
According to the United States Census Bureau, the town has a total area of 1.7 square miles (4.4 km^{2}), all land. The town is situated in the Chestuee Creek Valley, a broad valley carved by a tributary of the Hiwassee River, which passes a few miles to the southwest. The Unicoi Mountains, part of the greater Blue Ridge Range, dominate the horizon to the south. U.S. Route 411 connects Englewood to Madisonville to the northeast and Etowah to the south. Tennessee State Highway 39 (South Niota Road and West Athens Street) connects Englewood to Athens, opposite the hills to the west and as Tellico Street, connects Englewood to Tellico Plains to the east.

== Demographics ==
Historical population
| Census | Pop. | Note | %± |
|---|---|---|---|
| 1920 | 1,271 | | — |
| 1930 | 1,471 | | 15.7% |
| 1940 | 1,342 | | −8.8% |
| 1950 | 1,545 | | 15.1% |
| 1960 | 1,574 | | 1.9% |
| 1970 | 1,878 | | 19.3% |
| 1980 | 1,840 | | −2.0% |
| 1990 | 1,611 | | −12.4% |
| 2000 | 1,590 | | −1.3% |
| 2010 | 1,532 | | −3.6% |
| 2020 | 1,483 | | −3.2% |

=== 2020 census ===
Englewood racial composition
| Race | Number | Percentage |
|---|---|---|
| White (non-Hispanic) | 1,355 | 87.42% |
| Black or African American (non-Hispanic) | 6 | 0.4% |
| Native American | 4 | 0.27% |
| Asian | 2 | 0.13% |
| Other/Mixed | 81 | 5.22% |
| Hispanic or Latino | 102 | 6.58% |

As of the 2020 United States census, there were 1,550 people, 703 households, and 493 families residing in the town. The population density was 934.4 inhabitants per square mile (360.8/km^{2}). There were 760 housing units at an average density of 446.6 per square mile (172.4/km^{2}). There were 703 households, out of which 31.8% had children under the age of 18 living with them, 51.5% were married couples living together, 14.0% had a female householder with no husband present, and 31.8% were non-families. 29.9% of all households were made up of individuals, and 14.9% had someone living alone who was 65 years of age or older. The average household size was 2.37 and the average family size was 2.94.

In the town, the population was spread out, with 25.9% under the age of 18, 8.0% from 18 to 24, 27.0% from 25 to 44, 22.1% from 45 to 64, and 16.9% who were 65 years of age or older. The median age was 36 years. For every 100 females, there were 94.4 males. For every 100 females age 18 and over, there were 83.8 males.

The median income for a household in the town was $24,000, and the median income for a family was $29,792. Males had a median income of $29,000 versus $22,583 for females. The per capita income for the town was $13,752. About 17.0% of families and 20.1% of the population were below the poverty line, including 24.7% of those under age 18 and 14.7% of those age 65 or over.

== Education ==
McMinn County Schools operates public schools, including Englewood Elementary School, and McMinn Central High School. It was served by Englewood High School until a fire destroyed it in December 1963. McMinn Central opened in fall 1966, with students from Englewood and Etowah.
