= Wynne F. Clouse =

American politician

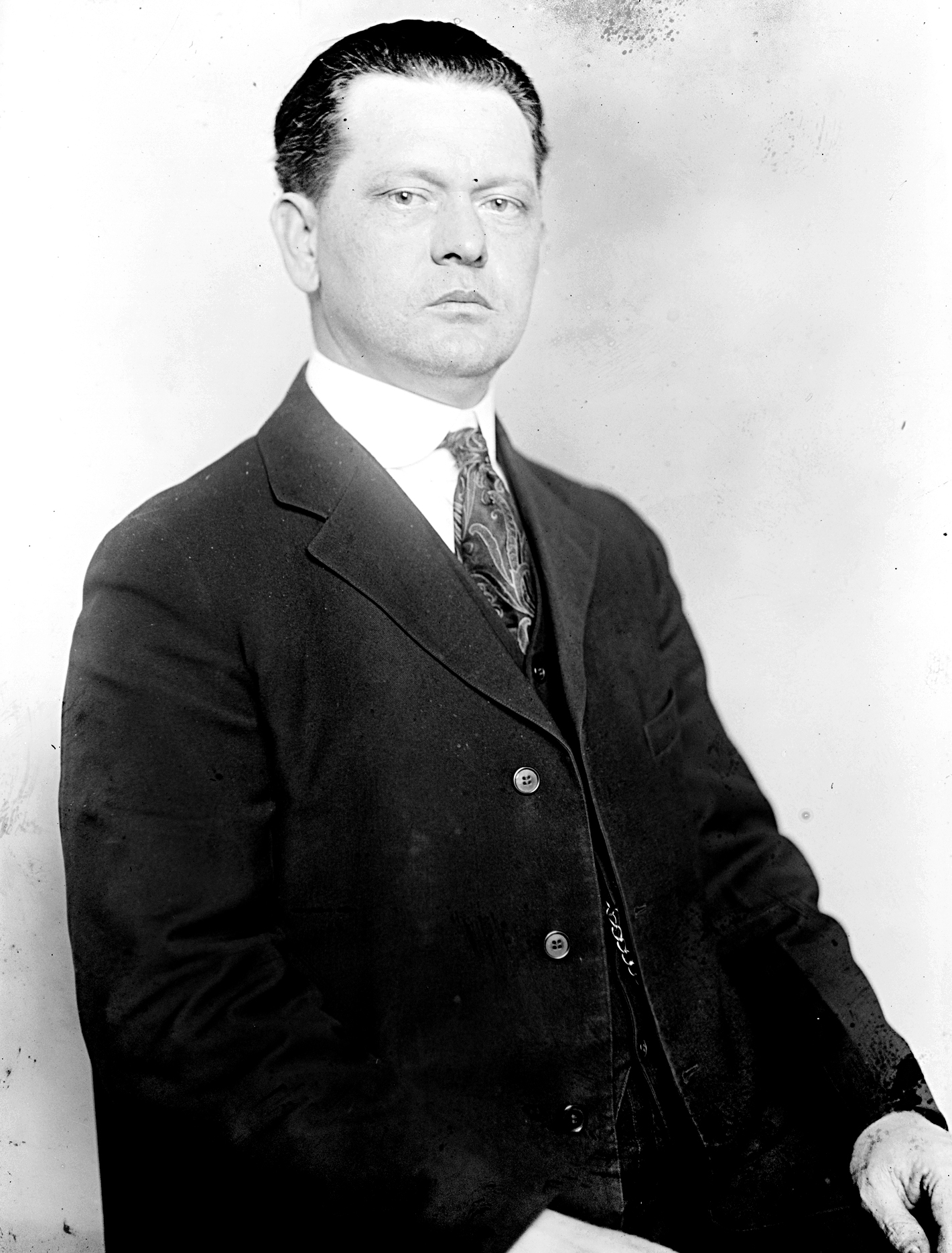

Member of the U.S. House of Representatives from Tennessee's 4th district
- In office March 4, 1921 – March 3, 1923
- Preceded by: Cordell Hull
- Succeeded by: Cordell Hull

Personal details
- Born: August 29, 1883 Putnam County, Tennessee, United States
- Died: February 19, 1944 (aged 60) Franklin, Tennessee
- Party: Republican
- Spouse: Linnie Shine Dowell Clouse
- Children: Eunetta Clouse
- Education: Cumberland University
- Profession: Attorney; politician

Wynne F. Clouse (August 29, 1883 – February 19, 1944) was a U.S. representative from Tennessee.

== Biography ==
Born in Goffton, near Cookeville, Tennessee, Clouse was the son of Thomas Jefferson and Eunetta Zina Bumbalough Clouse. He attended the public schools and was graduated from Cleveland Hill Academy, Pleasant Hill, Tennessee, in 1898. He married Linnie Shine Dowell on December 23, 1907 and had a child, Eunetta Clouse. Clouse graduated from Cumberland University, Lebanon, Tennessee, in 1911, where studied law at Cumberland School of Law. He was admitted to the bar in 1911 and commenced practice in Cookeville, Tennessee, in 1912. He served as delegate to the Republican National Conventions in 1916 and 1924.

== Career ==
Clouse was elected as a Republican to the Sixty-seventh Congress (March 4, 1921 – March 3, 1923). An unsuccessful candidate for reelection in 1922 to the Sixty-eighth Congress, he resumed the practice of law in the city of Nashville.

Appointed receiver of the Tennessee Central Railroad Company, Clouse served as special assistant to the Attorney General of the United States in 1924. He was appointed Referee in Bankruptcy for the Nashville division of the middle district of Tennessee and served until his resignation in January 1940.

== Death ==
Clouse died in Franklin, Tennessee, February 19, 1944 (age 60 years, 174 days). He is interred at Mount Hope Cemetery.

U.S. House of Representatives
Preceded by Cordell Hull	Member of the U.S. House of Representatives from Tennessee's 4th congressional district March 4, 1921 - March 3, 1923	Succeeded by Cordell Hull
