= Cordell Hull =

American politician and diplomat (1871–1955)

- Hull in 1940

47th United States Secretary of State
- In office March 4, 1933 – November 30, 1944
- President: Franklin D. Roosevelt
- Deputy: William Phillips; Sumner Welles; Edward Stettinius Jr.
- Preceded by: Henry L. Stimson
- Succeeded by: Edward Stettinius Jr.

United States Senator from Tennessee
- In office March 4, 1931 – March 3, 1933
- Preceded by: William Emerson Brock
- Succeeded by: Nathan L. Bachman

Member of the U.S. House of Representatives from Tennessee's 4th district
- In office March 4, 1923 – March 3, 1931
- Preceded by: Wynne F. Clouse
- Succeeded by: John R. Mitchell
- In office March 4, 1907 – March 3, 1921
- Preceded by: Mounce Gore Butler
- Succeeded by: Wynne F. Clouse

17th Chair of the Democratic National Committee
- In office November 2, 1921 – July 22, 1924
- Preceded by: George White
- Succeeded by: Clem L. Shaver

Member of the Tennessee House of Representatives
- In office 1893–1897

Personal details
- Born: October 2, 1871 Olympus, Tennessee, U.S.
- Died: July 23, 1955 (aged 83) Washington, D.C., U.S.
- Resting place: Washington National Cathedral
- Party: Democratic
- Spouse: Rose Frances (Witz) Whitney (m. 1917; died 1954)
- Education: National Normal University; Cumberland University (LLB)
- Awards: Nobel Peace Prize

Military service
- Allegiance: United States
- Branch/service: Tennessee Volunteer Infantry
- Years of service: 1898
- Rank: Captain
- Battles/wars: Spanish–American War
- Cordell Hull's voice Hull warning the US public of the Axis powers during World War II; Recorded July 23, 1942

Cordell Hull (October 2, 1871 – July 23, 1955) was an American politician and diplomat who served as the United States secretary of state for nearly twelve years under President Franklin D. Roosevelt, from 1933 to 1944. A member of the Democratic Party, he is the longest-serving secretary of state in United States history. Hull previously represented Tennessee in both houses of the United States Congress for 24 years, first as a member of the U.S. House of Representatives from 1907 to 1921 and again from 1923 to 1931, and as a U.S. senator from 1931 to 1933. Hull also served as a member of the Tennessee House of Representatives from 1893 to 1897.

Born in a log cabin in what is now Pickett County, Tennessee, Hull's early career included service as a lawyer, military officer in the Spanish–American War, state legislator, and judge before his election to the House of Representatives in 1906. He served in Congress for over two decades, interrupted only briefly by a term as chairman of the Democratic National Committee. In 1933, Roosevelt appointed Hull as Secretary of State, a position in which he became a principal architect of the Good Neighbor policy toward Latin America and a key figure in shaping U.S. foreign policy during the lead-up to and early years of World War II.

Hull's legacy is most closely associated with his efforts to promote international cooperation through trade and diplomacy. He was instrumental in the passage of the Reciprocal Trade Agreements Act of 1934, which reduced U.S. tariffs and paved the way for more open global markets. He was also a driving force in the creation of the United Nations, earning him the Nobel Peace Prize in 1945 for his “pivotal role” in the organization's founding.

== Early life and education ==
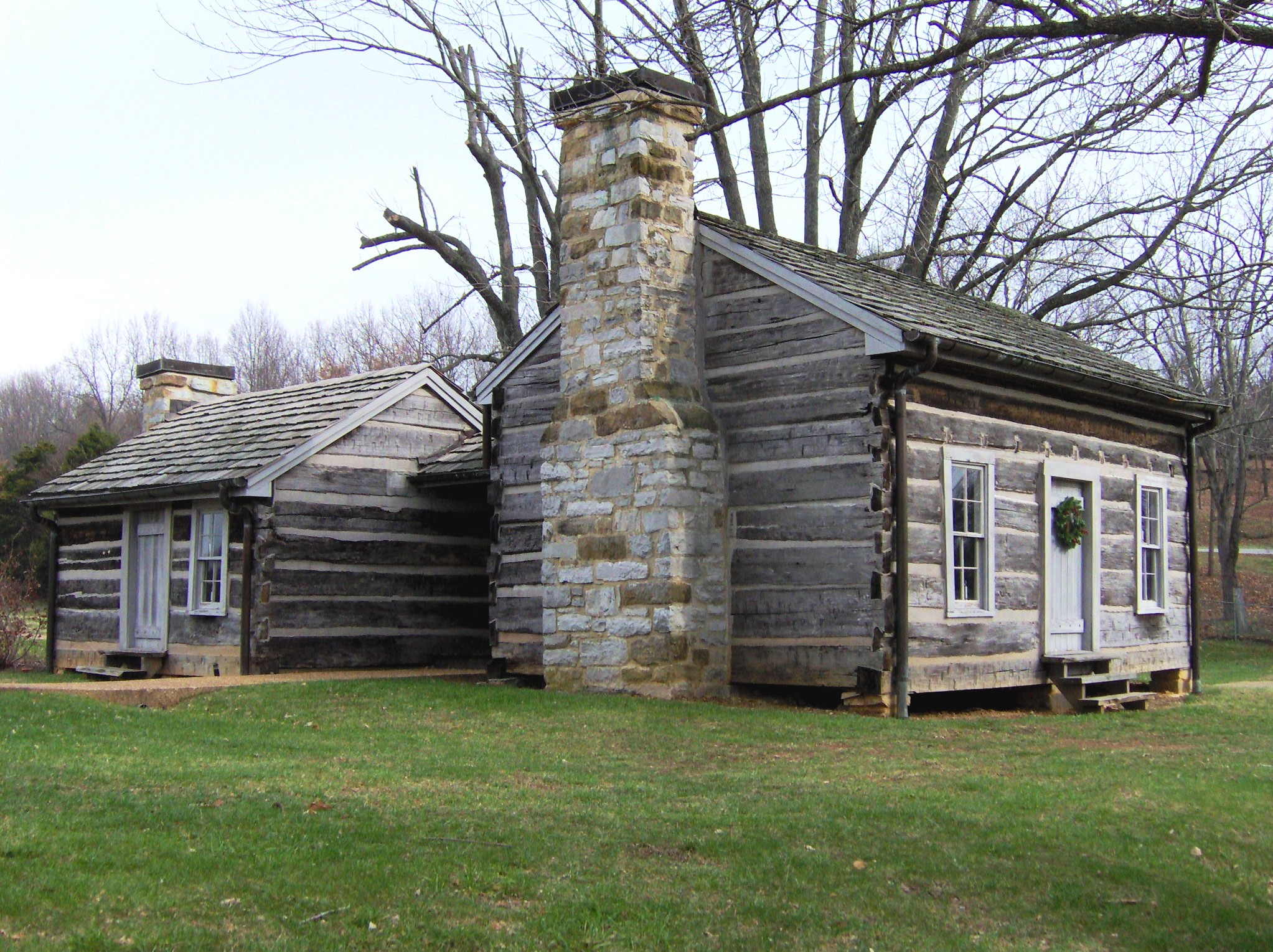
Cordell Hull's boyhood home in Olympus, Tennessee

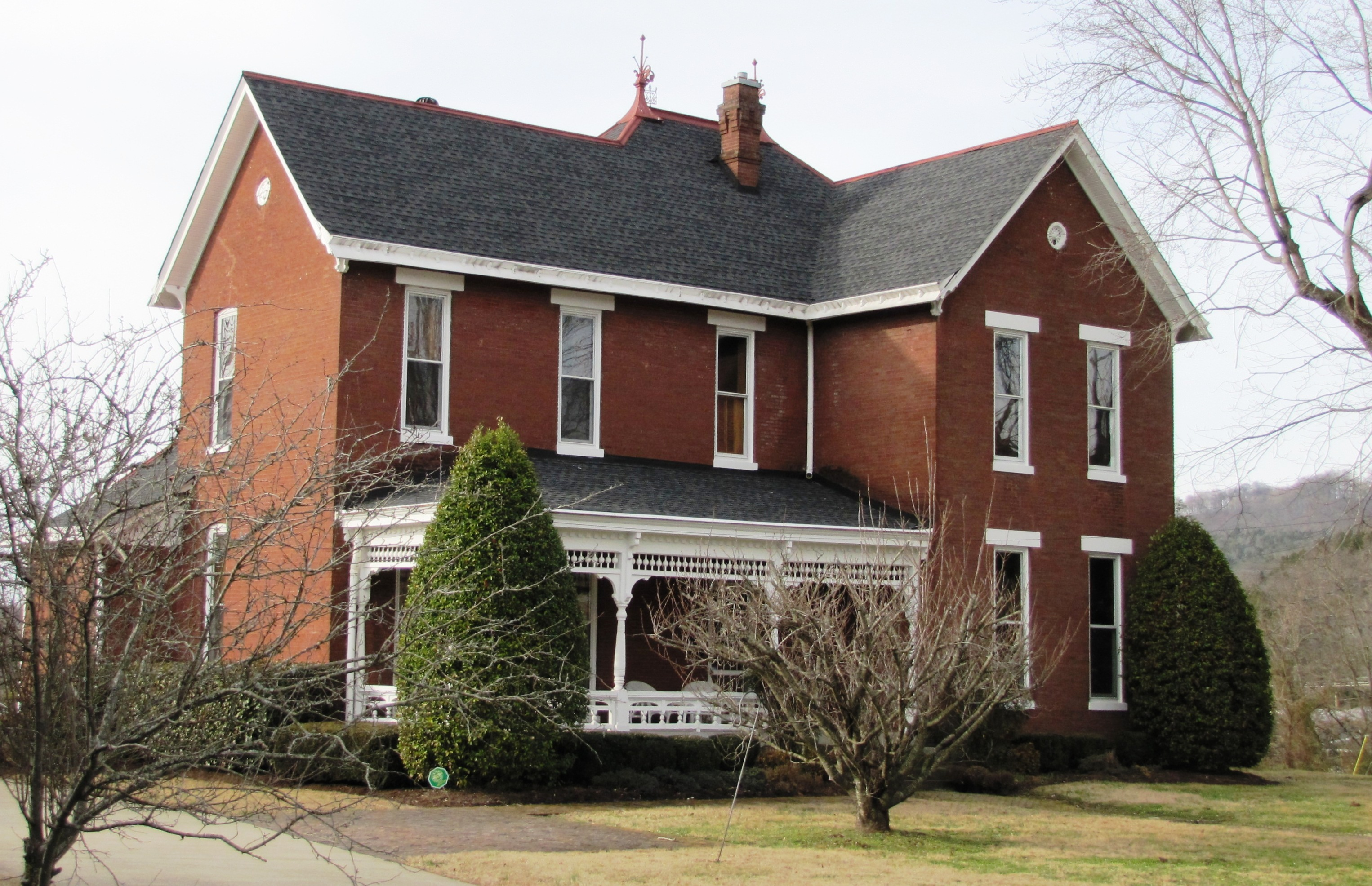
The Davis-Hull House in Carthage, Tennessee. The house was built by merchant Calvin Davis in 1889, and purchased by William Hull (the father of Cordell Hull) in 1906.

Cordell Hull was born in a log cabin in Olympus, Tennessee, which is now part of Pickett County, Tennessee, but was then part of Overton County. He was the third of the five sons of William Paschal Hull (1840–1923) and Mary Elizabeth Hull (née Riley) (1841–1903). His brothers were named Orestes (1868), Sanadius (1870), Wyoming (1875), and Roy (1881).

According to John Gunther, Hull's father had tracked down and killed a man because of a blood feud. His mother was a descendant of Isaac Riley, who was granted 200 acres (81 ha) in near Byrdstown in Pickett County, for Revolutionary War service, as well as Samuel Wood who emigrated from Leicestershire, England, on the ship Hopewell and fought in the Virginia Militia. Hull's mother's family (Riley-Wood) had numerous ancestors who fought in the Revolutionary War. Hull devoted a section in his memoirs "Cabin on the Hill" to dispelling an old rumor that his father was part Cherokee Indian, and subsequent documented family history has confirmed his ancestry.

Hull recalled in his memoirs that growing up in rural Tennessee that "Each person stood solidly by his politics and religion. Father and all of his people were Democrats of the strictest sect from the Civil War on". Like almost all white Southerners of his generation, Hull was a committed Democrat as white Southerners of his era could not bring themselves to vote for the Republicans, the party of Abraham Lincoln. Growing up, Hull was deeply influenced by the ideas of Thomas Jefferson and he always defined himself as a "Jeffersonian Democrat". Hull wrote in his memoirs that: "I had become greatly interested in Jefferson's philosophy and preachments. I took the basic principles of Jefferson and molded them into my own tenets of political thought and action. I learned from memory large extracts from the Declaration of Independence, Jefferson's first inaugural address, and the Bill of Rights in the Federal Constitution, modeled on the Virginia Bill of Rights. I believed that the final achievement of five hundred years' struggle for Anglo-Saxon liberty was written in these axioms and principles". In rural Tennessee in the 19th century, violence was extremely common and socially accepted, which greatly influenced Hull when he was growing up. He grew up in a world where the law was weak and a "might is right" philosophy prevailed as fraud and force rather than justice and fairness were the main criteria for social success. Hull accepted that most people were self-interested, dishonest and selfish, and that the only way to maintain order in a world that was nasty and brutish was the strict application of the law, which had to be upheld by force.

Hull attended college from 1889 until 1890. He gave his first speech at the age of 16. At the age of 19, Hull became the elected chairman of the Clay County Democratic Party. Hull studied at National Normal University (later merged with Wilmington College, Ohio) from 1889 until 1890. In 1891, he graduated from Cumberland School of Law at Cumberland University with an LL.B. degree and was admitted to the bar.

== Congressman ==
Hull served in the Tennessee House of Representatives from 1893 until 1897. During the Spanish–American War, he served in Cuba as a captain in the Fourth Regiment of the Tennessee Volunteer Infantry. He did not see action, with the main danger to him and his men being malaria, which killed far more American soldiers in Cuba than did Spanish bullets. Hull's tour of duty in Cuba was his first time outside the United States.

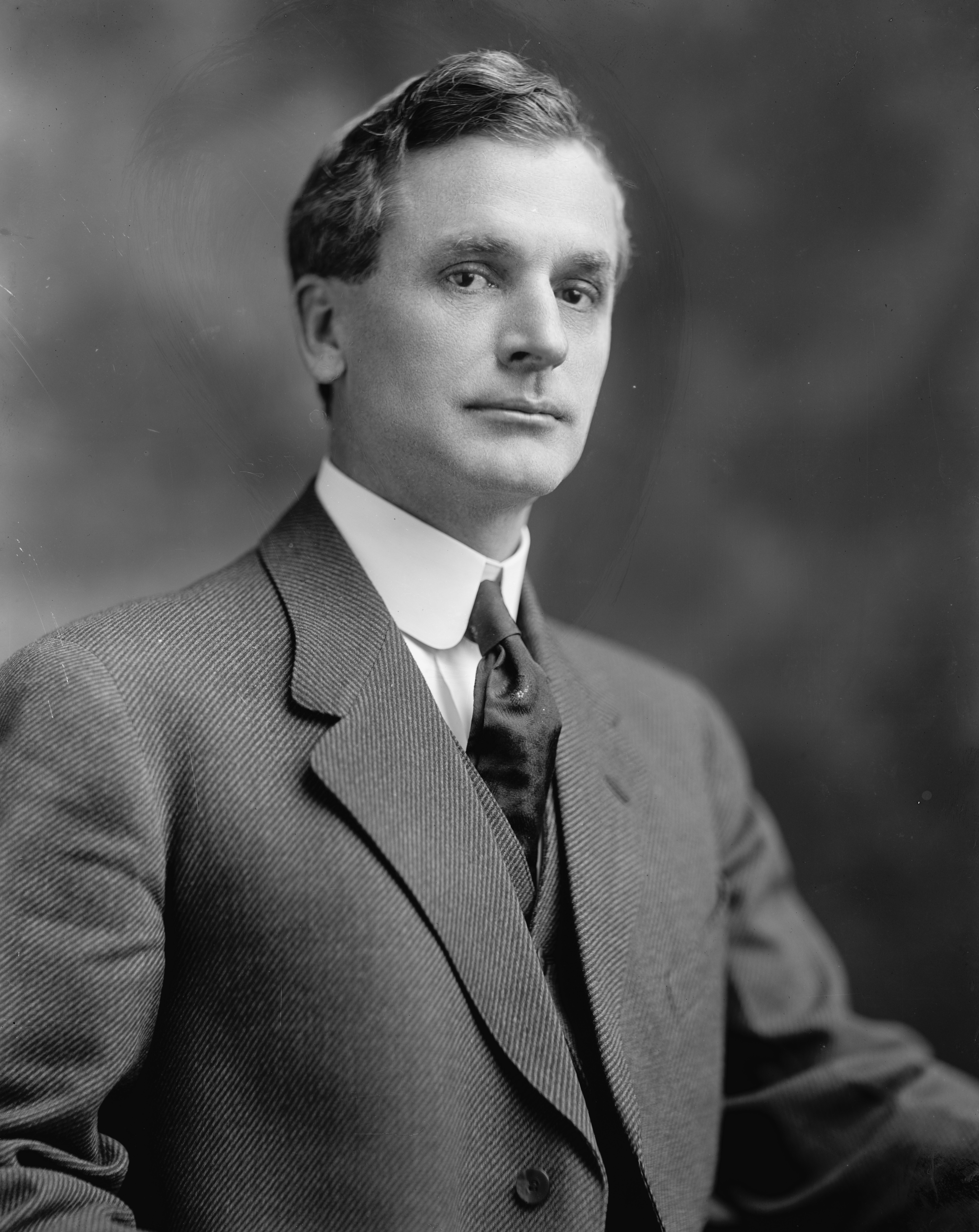
Portrait by Harris & Ewing c. 1913

Hull was elected to the United States House of Representatives where he served 11 terms (1907–1921 and 1923–1931) totaling 22 years. As a member of the powerful Ways and Means committee, he fought for low tariffs and "almost singlehandedly" wrote the federal income tax law of 1913. From the time of his first election to the House in 1906, Hull had been strongly opposed to tariffs, which he felt were an unfair burden on the poor farmers of Tennessee he represented. Hull argued that tariffs on foreign products increased the prices for everyone as well as decreasing competition. He argued that the best way to prosperity was to lower tariffs and to make up for the lost revenue caused by lowering tariff favored the introduction of an income tax. He felt that an graduated income with higher earners paying more taxes was a more fairer system of collecting revenue than tariffs which raised prices for everyone regardless of their income level. He also felt that lowering tariffs would lead to greater competition for the American consumers by allowing foreign firms to compete with American firms, which felt would lead to lower prices for consumers.

At the time, the United States had no income tax with the principal source of revenue being tariffs, and Hull's call to radically revise the collection of revenue was considered radical. He also served as a local judge from 1913 to 1917. As a judge, Hull was known as a strict "law and order" judge who liked to give "tough" sentences. For the rest of his life, Hull was usually addressed as "Judge". Hull was considered to be brave and tenacious, but also as extremely stubborn and obstinate as he rarely changed his views on any issue. One associate said of him: "Hull never starts anywhere unless he knows where he is going and he never turns back". In public, Hull maintained a "gently benign manner" alongside a stoical dignity, which masked a fierce determination to achieve what he wanted. Hull was not a trained economist, but he was considered a leading authority on the subject of taxes to such extent he wrote articles on tax reform for the Quarterly Journal of Economics published by Harvard University.

In 1912, the Democrats won the presidency and control of both houses of Congress. In April 1913, the Underwood tariff was introduced in the House. The Underwood tariff was passed by the House on 30 September 1913 and in the Senate on 3 October 1913 and was then signed into law by President Woodrow Wilson. The Underwood tariff cut tariffs to their lowest rate in decades and caused a $110 million shortage in revenue collection. Hull, who by this point was regarded as the Democrats' leading expert on economic and financial matters wrote the bill for the income tax to make up the revenue shortage, which passed both houses of Congress on 31 October 1913.After the First World War began in 1914, Hull became convinced the root cause of the war in Europe was protectionism and argued that if Europe had more free trade the war would have been avoided. In February 1916, he introduced a resolution calling for Wilson to host a peace conference to end the war along with ending protectionism in general. In 1917, he voted for the declaration of war against Germany. In 1919, he supported Wilson's call for the United States to join the League of Nations.

== DNC chairman ==
After his defeat in the congressional election of 1920, he served as chairman of the Democratic National Committee. Hull recalled that when he became chairman that: "I took charge of the Democratic Party, when it was at its lowest ebb, and its treasury bankrupt. Many persons had predicted it would not recover from the terrific blow dealt by the Republican 1920 landside. The Party was heavily in debt. It was my task to awaken it, infuse new hope in it, stimulate its ideas, help formulate its programs, and pay off its debt." Hull had a reputation as a hardworking, frugal leader who succeeded in paying off the Democratic Party's debts and left the party with a $30, 000 surplus when he retired as chairman in 1924. He was considered to be a dull and unimaginative leader, but also someone who was forceful in attempting to impose order on a party that was deeply divided and prone to factionalism, especially over the issue of Prohibition.

In the 1920s, the Democrats were badly divided into an urban, liberal wing vs. a rural conservative wing. No other issue divided the Democrats as much as Prohibition which was supported by the rural, conservative wing while being fiercely opposed by the urban, liberal wing. One journalist wrote in 1926 that the Democrats were a party that was "half dry and half wet, half fanatical and half materialistic, half rural and half urban" while in Congress Democratic senators and congressmen spent their time "insulting each other on the liquor issue, fanning the blaze of religious bigotry, one faction intimating that if the other faction gained ascendancy in the party, there will be no party". In 1924, the Democrats had a disastrous national convention where the divisions between the rural "dry" (i.e. pro-Prohibition) vs. the urban "wet" (i.e. anti-Prohibition) wing were all too openly aired. Hull belonged to the rural wing who was very much influenced by Thomas Jefferson's ideas of an agrarian democracy as the ideal to achieve despite the way that the United States had become a considerably more urban country since Jefferson's time. Many Democrats from urban areas found Hull's commitment to Jefferson's vision of an agrarian democracy to be highly anachronistic in confronting the challenges of life in the 20th century. Nevertheless, Hull had a reputation as a pragmatist who sought to find a way to close the divide between the two wings of the Democratic party. In January 1926, Hull first met Franklin D. Roosevelt, who was one of the leaders of the liberal faction, but also known as a pragmatist who sought to unite the party. Hull was himself ideologically liberal; amassing a strongly prolabor voting record during his time in Congress.

In the spring of 1927, Hull offered a series of "talking points" that were designed to help the Democrats unite in order to win the 1928 election. Hull wrote in March 1927 that: "'Get together' should be the Democratic watchword from this time forward. There is no earthly reason why the Democrats of the nation cannot wholeheartedly unite behind the whole body of the Jefferson doctrines and fight their way to victory next year." Hull defined his "talking points" as: "an appeal for a revival of the oldtime spirit which prompted Democratic leaders to meet each other in a spirit of mutual concession and agree on an adequate program, etc." However, Hull's "talking points", which were based upon what he called he called "Jeffersonian political liberalism" prompted charges that he was a man who was intellectually still living in the late 18th-early 19th centuries with many urban Democrats charging he had nothing to say about the problems of America in the 1920s. Hull's Jeffersonian views along with his background as someone from a small farm in Tennessee explained much of his opposition to protectionism. He frequently complained that imposing high tariffs on foreign goods led to other nations responding likewise, which very much hurt American farms who found their products shut out of foreign markets. American farmers were too efficient for their own good as the United States produced far more food than it could ever consume, which led Hull to argue that United States needed to export food in order to keep farming profitable, which was greatly hindered by the high tariffs that other nations imposed on American goods.

He felt it was both humane and sensible to lower tariffs as he noted in a 1923 speech that were over 250 million people suffering from malnutrition in Europe while the United States was producing far more food than it ever consume, which led him to argue that the surplus food should go to Europe, which thus end hunger in Europe while benefitting American farmers. Hull charged that the policy of Republican presidents and the Republican Congress in seeking prosperity via protectionism had been a disaster for American farmers as he wrote in 1927: "The dominant leaders of the political party in charge of the federal government have viewed with careless indifference the gradual collapse of agriculture, the greatest industry in America, on account of neglect and mistreatment, without any serious effort or constructive plan or purpose to arrest and remedy the conditions of destruction and decay. The facts constituting this indictment are within the knowledge of every American farmer. Opposition to excessive tariffs, lower production costs, wider and better foreign markets, farm cooperation, and equality before the law, have comprised the economic policies of Democrats which have been consistently ignored by the party in power since 1920".

He was one of several candidates for president at the 1928 Democratic National Convention, which ultimately chose Al Smith as nominee. Hull was influential in advising Albert Gore, Sr. to run for the U.S. Congress in 1938. Hull recorded twenty-five years of combined service in the House and the Senate.

== Secretary of State ==
=== Arrival in Foggy Bottom ===
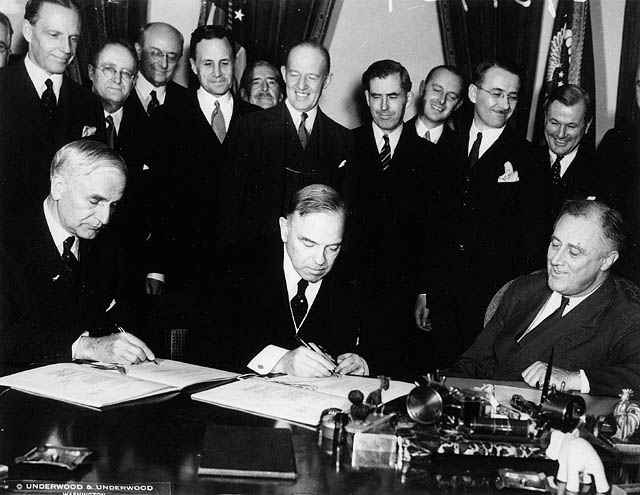
Signing of the United States-Canada Trade Agreement. Seated, L-R: Cordell Hull, William L. M. King and Franklin D. Roosevelt in Washington, on November 16, 1935.

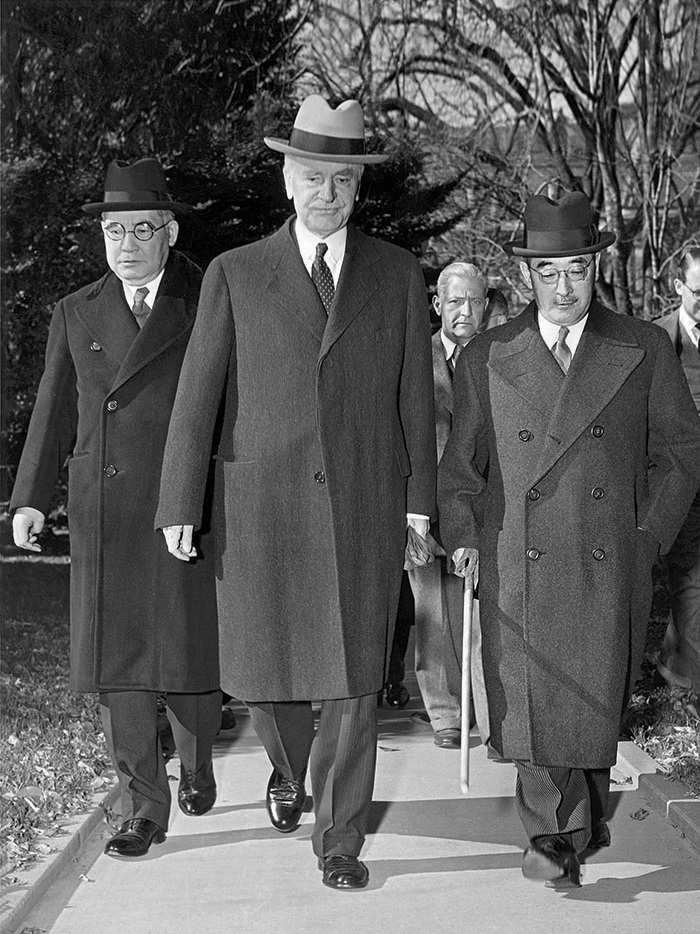
Japanese Ambassador Admiral Kichisaburō Nomura (left) and Special Envoy Saburō Kurusu (right) meet Hull on 17 November 1941, two weeks before the attack on Pearl Harbor (7 December 1941).

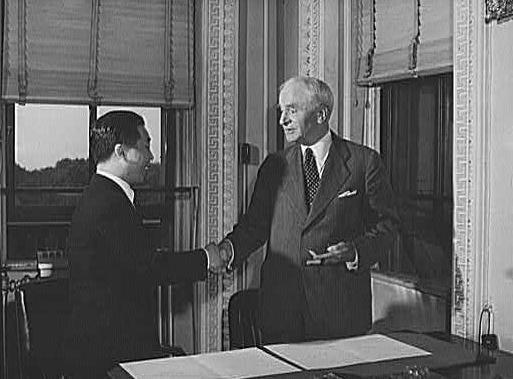
Hull and Chinese Ambassador Wei Daoming at the State Department exchanging ratifications of the 1943 treaty abolishing extraterritorial rights of the United States in China.

Hull won election to the Senate in 1930, but resigned from it in 1933 to become Secretary of State. Hull became one of Roosevelt's strongest Southern allies during the 1932 presidential campaign. As Secretary of State, Hull was critical of aspects of Roosevelt's New Deal, which he saw as corrupting Jefferson's vision of what America should be like, but he rarely expressed his disagreements as he was deeply loyal to the Democratic party and did not wish a return to the divisions of the 1920s. Hull believed that the role of the federal government in the economy should be more or less what Jefferson had prescribed, and felt that Roosevelt was vastly overreaching with his New Deal policies. Nevertheless, Hull was supportive of both social welfare and what he called "much needed reforms;" something that he noted to Roosevelt. In his memoirs, Hull paid tribute Roosevelt as “one of the greatest social reformers in our modern history.”

Roosevelt named him Secretary of State and appointed him to lead the American delegation to the London Economic Conference, which then collapsed when Roosevelt rejected its main plans. Hull spoke in the idiom of the backwoods of Tennessee, having what the American historian W.H. Chamberlain called a "transcendent talent for picturesque profanity" to express himself. Hull's tendency to use vulgar four-letter words to express himself, especially when he was angry, gave him the reputation of being crude and forceful in his mannerisms, which stood in marked contrast to his public image as a gentle, soft-spoken and quietly dignified man. Hull was said to have had the most "foulest mouth" in Roosevelt's cabinet. Roosevelt served in effect as his own Secretary of State as he took a strong interest in foreign policy, which he sought to direct himself. The president saw Hull merely as performing administrative functions at the State Department along with handling relations with nations that Roosevelt was not interested in such as the Latin American republics. During the talks that led to American recognition of the Soviet Union in 1933 Hull and the State Department were excluded by Roosevelt under the grounds that Hull as a religious man had too many issues with establishing diplomatic relations with the atheist state. William Christian Bullitt Jr., one of Roosevelt's friends who had been a leading advocate of American recognition of Soviet Russia since his meeting at the Kremlin with Vladimir Lenin in 1919, instead handled talks with Maxim Litvinov, the Soviet foreign commissar.

=== Friction with cabinet ===
The American historian David Kennedy described Hull as "a plodding bureaucrat", a hard-working and efficient Secretary of State who worked six days a week (Hull usually took Sundays off) as well as being very dull, dour, unimaginative and a poor public speaker. Hull's nickname in Washington D.C was "Parsons Hull", a reference to his Protestant faith along with his dour image. Roosevelt excluded Hull from relations with nations such as the United Kingdom, France, the Soviet Union and Germany that he considered important and often humiliated him by undercutting him as he did at the London Economic Conference in 1933. From 1937 onwards, the man who dominated the State Department was Hull's nominal deputy, the Undersecretary Sumner Welles, who had Roosevelt's trust and confidence in a way that Hull did not. Hull found this situation to be very humiliating and he came to hate Welles, who he felt had usurped his functions as Secretary of State.

The American historian Irwin Gellman wrote of the three men who dominated American foreign policy in the late 1930s-early 1940s all had secrets they sought to hide from the public. That Roosevelt was paralyzed from the waist downwards as a result of the polio he contracted during a visit to Canada in 1921 was a very closely guarded secret and the vast majority of Americans had no idea that Roosevelt was confined to a wheelchair. Likewise, Welles was a closeted gay man with a fetish for sex with black men, an aspect of his life that he sought very hard to keep secret as revelations of his sexuality would have destroyed his career. Finally, Hull knew he was dying slowly of sarcoidosis and stayed at the State Department despite the way Roosevelt treated him out of the hope that he could make an important difference in the affairs of the world before his death. Hull also carefully guarded the secret that his wife was Jewish, which he felt would have damaged his reputation in Tennessee, a state where the majority of the people were fundamentalist Protestants of one sort or another and where the Ku Klux Klan had many chapters. Paradoxically, being married to a Jewish woman made Hull unwilling to do anything that might being seen as championing Jewish causes, which he believed would have destroyed his career as his opponents would accuse him of serving Jewish interests at the expense of American interests.

Hull denounced some of his cabinet colleagues, namely the Treasury Secretary Henry Morgenthau Jr., the Interior Secretary Harold L. Ickes, and the Agriculture Secretary Henry A. Wallace as "the extreme left-wing fringe people" and the "social welfarers", whom he believed were pushing Roosevelt in a left-wing direction that was damaging to America. The cabinet secretary whom Hull clashed with the most was Morgenthau, whose role as Treasury Secretary covered international finance. In addition, the Jewish Morgenthau was easily the member of Roosevelt's cabinet most hostile towards Nazi Germany, and Hull often claimed that Morgenthau was too "emotional" when it came to the subject of the Third Reich and acted in ways that served Jewish interests instead of American interests. Morgenthau for his part claimed that the State Department under Hull's leadership was too "timorous" and "conventional" when came to dealing with the fascist states as he accused Hull of being too influenced by the professional diplomats of the State Department. Morgenthau wrote that the career diplomats of the State Department had "a 'foreign office mentality'-the notion you can get things done by being a generous host at diplomatic banquets" and that most of them did not see any danger from the fascist states. Morgenthau believed that the fascist states, especially Nazi Germany, represented a form of radical evil that had to be combatted and he accused Hull with his obsession with trade agreements of being myopic on this manner for far too long. Significantly, Welles was the one State Department official whom Morgenthau respected as he believed Welles shared his views on fascism.

Hull was concerned about what he called the approach of the "Niagara of war", which he believed could be stopped by ending the global trade war. In particular, he wanted a free trade agreement with Great Britain, which he saw as the "central point or spearhead" for a "world program" that "would emanate from many centers." He believed that an Anglo-American economic bloc would be so powerful that it would bring into its embrace nations such as Germany that had imposed steep tariffs in an attempt to achieve autarky. Hull argued that once Adolf Hitler was persuaded of the folly of protectionism and autarky as a way to achieve prosperity for the Reich, he would no other choice but to adhere to the Anglo-American economic bloc and in this way that danger of an world war would be averted. Reflecting his long-standing beliefs, Hull saw his principle duty as Secretary of State as the "maintenance and promotion of peace throughout the world, both political and economical" and that "the truth is universally recognized that trade between nations is the greatest peace-maker and civilizer within human experience".

Hull took at face value the claims of Adolf Hitler and Benito Mussolini that Germany and Italy were "have not nations" whose potential for economic growth was being hampered by not having an empire in the case of Germany or having not much of an empire in the case of Italy. Hull wrote in 1936 that fascism was "the characteristic expressions of great peoples in revolt against the limitations placed upon their national prosperity by their poverty in natural resources." Both Hitler and Mussolini argued that their nations needed imperialism as the only way to grow their economies, claims that Hull accepted at face value, but he argued that if protectionism was ended, then Germany and Italy would not have to attack their neighbors to grow their economies. Hull cast Britain as the principal villain, arguing that the system of imperial preference tariffs established by the Ottawa Agreements in 1932 were the main source of global economic and political instability. In In January 1936, Hull told Sir Ronald Lindsay, the British ambassador in Washington, that it was the imperial preference system that caused the Second Italo-Ethiopian War, saying that Mussolini had been forced to invade Ethiopia in October 1935 because the Italian economy was being squeezed by the protectionist policies of other nations, and predicted that Germany would soon invade its neighbors if the global trade war continued.

Hull came into conflict with Morgenthau over his plans for a fund to hold Chinese silver in American banks to stabilize the value of the yuan. Hull argued that the State Department was responsible for relations with China and warned that Morgenthau's proposal to strengthen the yuan and hence China's economy would provoke Japan which regarded China as being within its sphere of influence. Both men appealed to Roosevelt who sided with Morgenthau and it was the Treasury Department rather than the State Department that conducted the talks that led to the Sino-American economic agreement of May 1936. The American historian John Blum wrote as a result of the Sino-American agreement that for the next year that China was able to "enjoy a period of unprecedented stability in both the internal and external value of her money."

It was only with the Japanese invasion in July 1937 that the value of the yuan started to slide again. In June 1936, Morgenthau argued that the policies of the Reichsbank president Hjalmar Schacht of manipulating the value of the Reichmark was a form of subsidy to German exports and used the provision of the American law that allowed tariffs to be raised on nations engaged in "dumping" (i.e. state subsided exports) to raise tariffs on Germany. Hull protested vehemently against Morgenthau's actions, arguing that the manipulation of the Reichmark was not a subsidy and that the United States should be trying to lower tariffs with Germany instead of raising them. Hull argued that Germany had the world's second largest economy and as the Nazi regime had extremely strong protectionist tendencies that Morgenthau's action would only encourage more protectionism on the part of the Reich, which would hinder Hull's plans to end the global trade war. Hull thought that, as a Jew, Morgenthau was too offended by Hitler's "vile treatment of the Jews, had already declared his personal war on Germany...He rushed blindly ahead with a project to throw a crowbar into the machinery of our foreign relations." Once again, both Hull and Morgenthau appealed to Roosevelt, who again sided with Morgenthau.

During the Spanish Civil War, Hull clashed with both Morgenthau and Ickes over the correct policy to follow. Hull favored a policy of strict neutrality, an arms embargo on both the Republicans and the Nationalists, and the end of the Comintern's policy of recruiting Americans to fight in the International Brigades of the Spanish Republican Army. Ickes wanted Roosevelt to lift the arms embargo on the Spanish Republic while Morgenthau wanted to make loans to the Spanish Republic. Ickes wrote in his diary that felt he much shame as an American when Hull announced he would not grant passports to Americans wanting to serve in the International Brigades, even to the extent of refusing passports to a group of women who wanted to serve as nurses in Spain. Much to the disgust of both Ickes and Morgenthau, Roosevelt chose the course advocated by Hull of strict neutrality, which they felt was in effect siding with the Spanish Nationalists who were supported with both troops and arms from Nazi Germany and Fascist Italy.

In a speech in 1937, New York City Mayor Fiorello H. La Guardia said that brown-shirted Nazis ought to be featured as the "climax" of a chamber of horrors in the upcoming World's Fair. The Nazi government organ, Der Angriff, called the mayor a "Jewish Ruffian" who had been bribed by Jewish and Communistic agents and was a criminal disguised as an officeholder. In the ensuing exchanges, Hull sent a letter of regret to Berlin for intemperate comments on both sides, but he also explained the principle of freedom of speech. As the response of Nazi propaganda organs rose in pitch to include characterizing American women as "prostitutes," Hull sent a letter of protest to Berlin, which elicited an "explanation" but no apology.

=== The "Good Neighbor" policy ===
Hull pursued the "Good Neighbor Policy" with Latin American nations, which has been credited with preventing Nazi subterfuge in that region. In 1938, Hull engaged in a dialog with Mexican Foreign Minister Eduardo Hay concerning the failure of Mexico to compensate Americans who lost farmlands during agrarian reforms in the late 1920s. He insisted that compensation must be "prompt, adequate and effective". Though the Mexican Constitution guaranteed compensation for expropriation or nationalization, nothing had yet been paid. While Hay admitted Mexico's responsibility, he replied that there is "no rule universally accepted in theory nor carried out in practice which makes obligatory the payment of immediate compensation...." The so-called "Hull formula" has been adopted in many treaties concerning international investment but is still controversial, especially in Latin American countries, which have historically subscribed to the Calvo doctrine, which suggests that compensation is to be decided by the host country and that as long as there is equality between nationals and foreigners and no discrimination, there can be no claim in international law. The tension between the Hull formula and the Calvo doctrine is still important in the law of international investment.

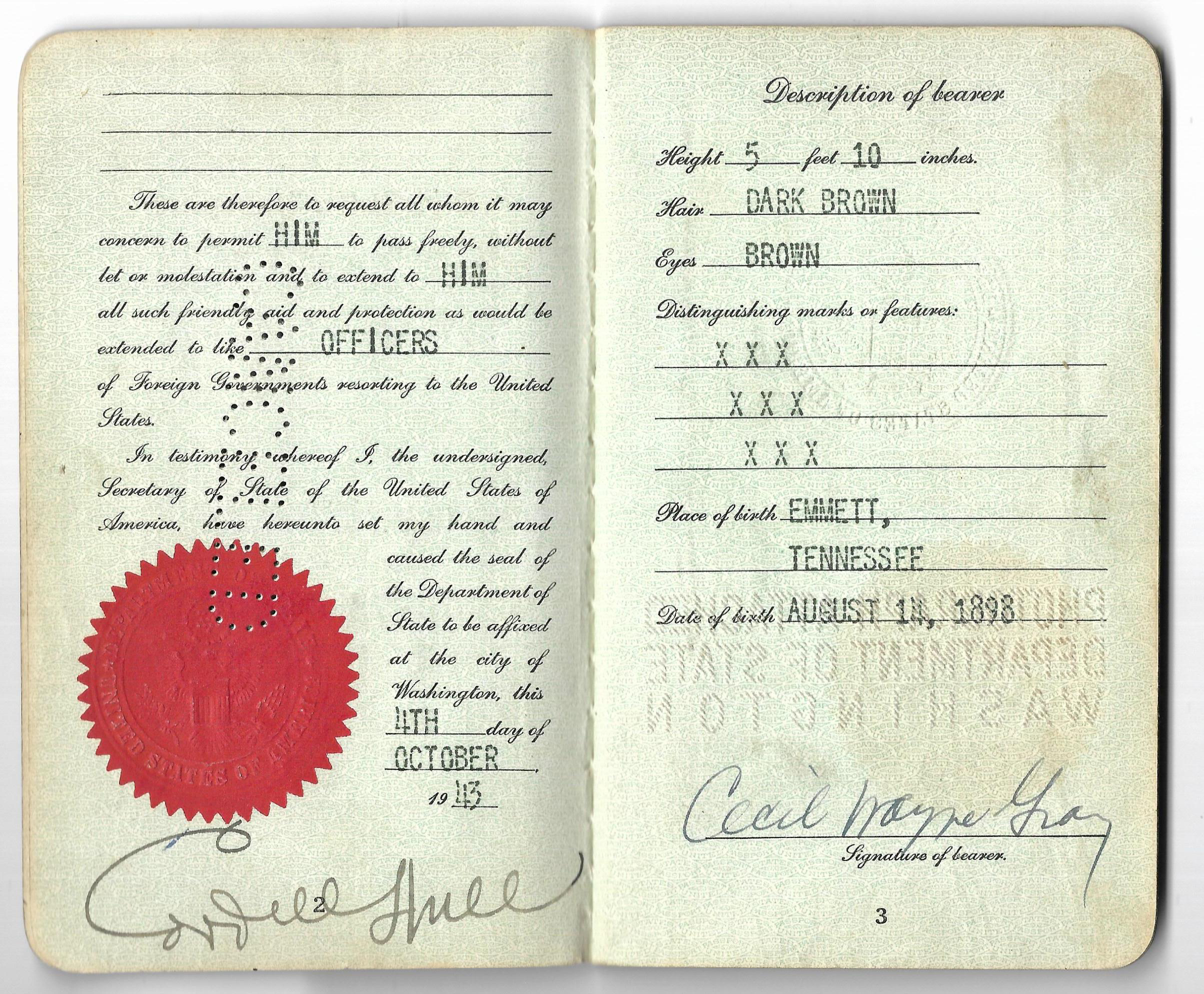
WW2 issued US Diplomatic passport signed by Secretary of State Cordell Hull.

=== Jews and SS St. Louis incident ===
In 1939, Hull advised Roosevelt to reject the SS St. Louis, a German ocean liner carrying 936 Jews seeking asylum from Germany. Hull's decision sent the Jews back to Europe on the eve of the Holocaust. Some historians estimate that 254 of the passengers were ultimately murdered by the Nazis.

Okay ...there were two conversations on the subject between (Secretary of the Treasury) Morgenthau and Secretary of State Cordell Hull. In the first, 3:17 PM on 5 June 1939, Hull made it clear to Morgenthau that the passengers could not legally be issued U.S. tourist visas because they had no return addresses. Furthermore, Hull made it clear to Morgenthau that the issue at hand was between the Cuban government and the passengers. The U.S., in effect, had no role. In the second conversation at 3:54 PM on June 6, 1939, Morgenthau said they did not know where the ship was and he inquired whether it was "proper to have the Coast Guard look for it". Hull responded by saying that he did not see any reason why it could not. Hull then informed him that he did not think that Morgenthau would want the search for the ship to get into the newspapers. Morgenthau said "Oh no. No, no. They would just—oh, they might send a plane to do patrol work. There would be nothing in the papers." Hull responded "Oh, that would be all right."

=== War in Europe ===
In the winter of 1939–1940, Roosevelt had decided to drop his vice president, John Nance Garner, a conservative Texas Democrat who during Roosevelt's second term had been increasingly unable to hide his hostility to the New Deal, and ensure that someone else was the Democratic candidate for vice president in the 1940 election. For a time, Roosevelt had wanted to make Hull the Democratic candidate for vice president, not the least as a way to placate the powerful conservative Southern faction in the Democratic Party who would have been unhappy at seeing Garner being dropped. Hull made it clear that he was not willing to serve as the vice presidential candidate as he charged that the vice presidency had no power and he disapproved of Roosevelt's decision to seek a third term. Hull's unwillingness to accept the offer that Roosevelt made led to strained relations throughout the 1940 election.

At the 1940 Democratic National Convention in Chicago, Ickes advised Roosevelt to fire Hull, whom he charged had been a disaster as Secretary of State. Ickes wrote in his diary when Roosevelt told him that Hull had been a good Secretary of State: "I told him [Roosevelt] that I had distinct views to the contrary, referring to our sale of scrap iron and oil to Japan, our refusal to sell munitions of war to Spain, and our holding back on Spain and Austria. I referred to Munich and the disposition of our State Department to let Chamberlain dictate our policy on foreign affairs. The President replied that anyway Cordell had gotten away with it. My answer was "Yes, he goes about looking like an early Christian martyr and the people think that he is wonderful just on the basis of his looks. However, no-one has ever attacked him on the basis of his record and I regard him as the most vulnerable man that we could name". Ickes added in his diary: "All that he [Hull] ever tried to do in addition to his futile protests at continued encroachments of the dictators, was to negotiate reciprocal trade agreements. These were all right so far as they went; they might had led to something in ordinary times when peace was the principle preoccupation of the nations of the world, but as I had remarked to the President on more than one occasion, with the world in turmoil they like hunting an elephant in the jungle with a fly swatter".

In September 1940, First Lady Eleanor Roosevelt maneuvered with another State Department official to bypass Hull's refusal to allow Jewish refugees aboard a Portuguese ship, the SS Quanza, to receive visas to enter the U.S. Through her efforts, the Jewish refugees disembarked on September 11, 1940, in Virginia. In a similar incident, American Jews sought to raise money to prevent the mass murder of Romanian Jews but were blocked by the State Department. "In wartime, in order to send money out of the United States, two government agencies had to sign a simple release—the Treasury Department under Henry Morgenthau and the State Department under Secretary Cordell Hull. Morgenthau signed immediately. The State Department delayed, delayed, and delayed, as more Jews were dying in the Transnistria camps."

== Negotiations with Japan ==
On 24 September 1940, Japan occupied the northern half of French Indochina (modern Vietnam, Laos, and Cambodia), which was viewed in the Roosevelt administration as an extremely hostile act. A debate ensured in the cabinet about what measures to take in response. The Treasury Secretary Henry Morgenthau Jr., the War Secretary Henry L. Stimson, and the Interior Secretary Harold L. Ickes all favored sanctions intended to cripple the Japanese economy. Hull by contrast with strong support from the Navy Secretary Frank Knox, the U.S. Navy admirals and Joseph Grew, the American ambassador to Japan, argued against sanctions as he predicated that the most likely Japanese response to sanctions would be to invade Southeast Asia to seize the resources to be found there. Roosevelt compromised by imposing sanctions on the sale of scrap iron and steel to Japan, but at Hull's urging excluded oil from the sanctions. However, Roosevelt did warn the Japanese that if they occupied the southern half of French Indochina, he would impose oil sanctions. Roosevelt excluded Hull from relations with the United Kingdom in 1940–1941 and Hull played no role whatever in the Lend-Lease talks, the ABC-1 talks and the Argentia Conference of 9–12 August 1941 where Roosevelt met the British Prime Minister Winston Churchill at Placentia Bay in the British colony of Newfoundland to issue the Atlantic Charter.

In July 1941, the Japanese prime minister, Prince Fumimaro Konoe ordered the occupation of the southern half of French Indochina, which led to the United States imposing oil sanctions on 22 July 1941. Joining the United States in imposing oil sanctions on Japan were Britain, the Dominions, and the Dutch government-in-exile which controlled the oil-rich Dutch East Indies (modern Indonesia), which in effect cut Japan off from all sources of oil. As Japan had stockpiled enough oil to last 18 months, a debate ensured in Tokyo about whatever to seize the European colonies in Southeast Asia to provide oil or seek a diplomatic resolution to the crisis. Konoe ordered preparations for war while opening talks with the United States. Several times, it was suggested by the Japanese ambassador Kichisaburō Nomura that Konoe hold a summit meeting with Roosevelt on a ship in the Pacific Ocean to resolve the crisis, an offer that Hull rejected. Konoe was prepared to negotiate with Roosevelt on the basis that Japan withdraw from French Indochina only after it had won the war with China, a position that was unacceptable to the U.S. government. Moreover, Konoe continued to hold to the position that Japan was morally and legally bound by the "Basic Treaty" it had signed with puppet Wang Jingwei regime, That claim that Japan was honor bound by the "Basic Treaty" was regarded by the Americans as absurd as Wang Jingwei was a Japanese puppet who faithfully followed the orders of his Japanese puppet masters and was in no way the leader of China that Konoe portrayed him as.

Roosevelt directed Hull to handle talks with the Japanese. The fact that Roosevelt ordered Hull to handle the negotiations. while not playing a significant role himself, was a clear indicator that Roosevelt did not see relations with Japan as especially important. Roosevelt always personally handled relations with nations that he considered important while leaving Hull to take care of relations with nations he felt were unimportant. The talks that Hull held with the Japanese diplomats in Washington D.C, namely the ambassador Kichisaburō Nomura and the special imperial envoy Saburō Kurusu soon extended from the subject of French Indochina to the subject of China. Both Morgenthau and Ickes complained that Hull was prepared to make too many concessions to the Japanese in order to avoid a war. Morgenthau was so outraged by Hull's approach that he wrote a letter to Roosevelt that he never sent that warned of a "Far Eastern Munich" in the making. Hull's approach to the talks led to protests from both the British and especially the Chinese about his willingness to abandon China to being absorbed into the Greater East Asia Co-Prosperity Sphere as the price of peace. Ickes wrote in his diary that about his pleasure that "the strenuous intervention of Churchill and Chiang Kai-shek had blocked the appeasers in the State Department". Ickes added that if Hull had made his deal with the Japanese that he had planned to resign in protest from the cabinet "with a ringing statement attacking the arrangement and raising hell generally with the State Department and its policy of appeasement".

=== Hull note ===
Hull also handled formal statements with foreign governments. During the talks in Washington, Hull had benefitted from the fact that the Americans had broken the Japanese diplomatic codes and were reading all of their diplomatic cables to and from Washington. Hull was well aware that the new prime minister in Tokyo, General Hideki Tojo was a hardliner and that the Japanese were moving troops into Southeast Asia. However, much like Roosevelt, Hull was complacent about the danger of a war with Japan. Notably he sent on 26 November 1941 the Hull note just prior to the Pearl Harbor attack, which was formally titled "Outline of proposed Basis for Agreement Between The United States and Japan." The American historian Herbert P. Bix wrote that the term "Hull note" is misleading as it implied that Hull had issued an ultimatum to Japan when he had not. The so-called Hull note had no time limit for its acceptance which is the case with ultimatums.. Moreover the first paragraph of the note stated it was a "tentative" offer and stated quite clearly that there was room for further negotiation on the basis of the note.

In his note, Hull had called for a complete Japanese withdrawal from China and French Indochina but did not give a time limit for when the withdrawal would take place. The Hull note stated that the only legitimate government of China was the government of Chiang Kai-shek based in Chongqing and firmly ruled out American recognition of the puppet government of Wang Jingwei based in Nanjing. More importantly, the Hull note did not define "China", and therefore did not distinguish it from Manchukuo. This caused confusion among Japanese leadership, who did not know if Hull was calling for a withdrawal only from the parts of China they had occupied since 1937, or included the puppet state of Manchukuo in his definition of China. Following its seizure in 1931, Manchukuo had functioned as a Japanese colony. Of all their conquests, Manchukuo was that the one that the Japanese people were most attached to, not least because millions of Japanese settlers had been brought into Manchukuo since 1931 and presumably would have to return to Japan if Chinese sovereignty was restored. Bix wrote that the Hull Note was far from being the humiliating ultimatum that Japanese historians portray it as, and that in fact Hull was prepared to make certain generous concessions to Japan to avoid a war.

Japanese Prime minister Hideki Tojo chose to misrepresent to his cabinet the Hull note as an ultimatum and claimed that the note had called for Japan to give up all of its conquests in China since 1931, which allowed Tojo to maintain that Japan now had no other choice but to go to war against the United States. The Japanese foreign minister Shigenori Tōgō was aware that the Hull note was not an ultimatum and that the note had stated that China was undefined term, but chose to remain silent at the cabinet meeting. Bix wrote that the Japanese cabinet was dealing in bad faith with the talks with the Americans as both Tojo and Tōgō claimed that Japan was honor bound by the "Basic Treaty" it had signed with its puppet Wang Jingwei regime in 1938 and could not reestablish diplomatic relations with the Kuomintang regime. Historian Eri Hotta states that both sides understood that the note would need to be modified before any agreement could be reached, with Hull claiming in his memoirs "we had no serious thought that Japan would accept our proposal."

On November 27 1941, Japanese ambassador Kichisaburō Nomura and special envoy Saburō Kurusu met with Hull and Roosevelt in the Oval Office. In response to the president's recommendation that Japan leave the Tripartite Pact, Nomura suggested a modification of the Hull note. Hull stated that this would not be considered "unless the opposition to the peace element in control of the Government should make up its mind definitively to act and talk and move in a peaceful direction... No conversations could or would get anywhere as has been so clearly demonstrated." The meeting was followed by a State Department press conference, stating that the US pursued diplomacy to the best of its abilities up to this point, and that any subsequent response would be Japan's choice.

== US entry into World War II ==
Hull received news of the Pearl Harbor attack on 7 December 1941 while he was outside his office. Nomura and Kurusu were waiting to see Hull with a 14-part message from the Japanese government that officially notified of a breakdown in negotiations. The United States had broken Japanese encryption, and Hull knew the message's contents. He blasted the diplomats: "In all my fifty years of public service, I have never seen such a document that was more crowded with infamous falsehood and distortion."

When the Free French Forces of Charles de Gaulle occupied the French islands of Saint-Pierre and Miquelon, south of Newfoundland, occupied by Vichy France, in December 24 1941, Hull lodged a very strong protest and went as far as referring to the Gaullist naval forces as "the so-called Free French." His request to have the Vichy governor reinstated was met with strong criticism in the American press: newspapers mocked the "so-called Secretary of State". The islands remained under the Free French until the end of the war. Hull, who always held de Gaulle in disregard, if not detestation, even before the incident, would never cease trying to maneuver against him during the rest of the war. He regarded de Gaulle as an unscrupulous adventurer whose word was not to be trusted, and was generally considered to be the American official most hostile to the Free French movement. Hull and Roosevelt also maintained relations with Vichy France, which Hull credited with allowing General Henri Giraud's forces to join allied forces in the North African campaign against Germany and Italy.

Throughout World War II, Hull found himself increasingly sidelined from the Roosevelt administration's inner circle on wartime strategy. While he remained central to formal diplomatic efforts, particularly in Latin America and in laying the groundwork for postwar institutions, he was often excluded from key decisions involving military planning and combined Allied strategy. In his memoirs, Hull expressed frustration that his proposal to participate in high-level war councils—especially those involving both diplomatic and military elements—was ignored by the president. Roosevelt instead relied on informal advisors and military leadership, limiting the Secretary of State's role in wartime governance. Hull chaired the Advisory Committee on Postwar Foreign Policy, which was created in February 1942.

In 1942, Roosevelt started to strongly press the British prime minister Winston Churchill to promise independence for India, saying it was time to end the Raj. Hull differed from Roosevelt on the question of India and in 1942 told Lord Halifax, the British ambassador in Washington, about his opposition to independence for "backward peoples" who were in his viewpoint incapable of governing themselves. Halifax reported to London that Hull was unwilling to openly criticize Roosevelt, but with an "eye on India" suggested that independence be delayed for "backward peoples". Hull advised Halifax that he should advise London that the British should make ending the Raj conditional on a promise that an independent India should immediately declare war on the Axis powers, a condition that was unlikely to be met as Mohandas Gandhi, the leader of the Indian Congress Party, was a pacifist.

Also in 1942, Wendell Willkie, the Republican candidate for president in the 1940 election, went on a semi-official and much publicized "one world" tour. Willkie had no official capacity to speak for the United States, but his trip had been publicity blessed by Roosevelt as a way to ensure bipartisan support for his foreign policy, all the more so as Willkie was one of the leaders of the liberal, internationalist wing of the Republicans. Hull was privately opposed to Willkie's trip, and even more so when Willkie during the China phase of his world journey publicity criticized American immigration laws for excluding Asians from coming to the United States. In response to Willkie's speech, the Chinese ambassador in Washington, Wei Daoming, asked Hull about when Asians could came as immigrants to America again, which inspired Hull to launch a rant against Willkie as a "troublemaking person" who went around the world creating "misunderstanding" between the Allies.

In the same speech in Chongqing, Willkie had called for an end to European imperialism in Asia as he urged Britain, France and the Netherlands to grant independence to all their colonies in Asia after war for those colonies occupied by Japan or immediately in the case of India and Ceylon. In a long, angry memo to Roosevelt, Hull lashed out at Willkie for his speech, saying that none of the Asian colonies were ready for independence and knowing of Roosevelt's dislike for European imperialism in Asia instead insisted that the model should be the Philippines. The Philippines had been an American colony which the United States had promised independence to in 1935 and had gradually devolving powers down to the Filipinos, which Hull stated was the better model for ending European imperialism in Asia.

In 1943, Hull served as United States delegate to the Moscow Conference. At times, his main objective was to enlarge foreign trade and lower tariffs. Some of the issues concerning the American role in World War II, were handled by Roosevelt working through Sumner Welles, the second-ranking official at the State Department, which caused conflicts between the two. Hull did not attend the summit meetings that Roosevelt had with Winston Churchill and Joseph Stalin. In 1943 Hull ended Welles's career at the State Department by threatening to expose allegations of his homosexuality dating back to 1941, and Hull threatened to resign if Welles was not let go due to the allegations and possibly concern that they could be used to blackmail Welles. In 1943, Hull tried hard to prevent Herbert Pell from serving as the U.S. delegate to the United Nations War Crimes Commission in London.

During Pell's time on the commission, Hull constantly hindered his work, making it very clear his distaste for both Pell and his views on punishing war crimes. Hull in particular objected to Pell's plans for American courts to try German officials for crimes against German citizens not only during the war, but also for the entirety of the Nazi dictatorship starting in 1933 as Pell argued that Nazi Germany was a criminal state and all of its actions should be treated as criminal. Hull argued that Pell's proposals violated international law and German sovereignty, but also more importantly created a precedent that could be highly dangerous for himself and other American officials. Lynching of Afro-Americans was a common practice in the South, and Hull noted that under Pell's proposals that defined crimes against humanity as state-sanctioned violence directed against groups for racial or religious reasons American officials could be tried for crimes against humanity for tolerating the practice of lynching. To counter the objections of Hull and others, Pell was forced to redefine crimes against humanity as state-sanctioned violence directed against groups for racial or religious reasons as part of the preparation for "aggressive war" or the waging of "aggressive war", which allowed Pell to claim that American officials would be protected from international justice for tolerating the lynching of blacks.

=== Establishing the United Nations ===
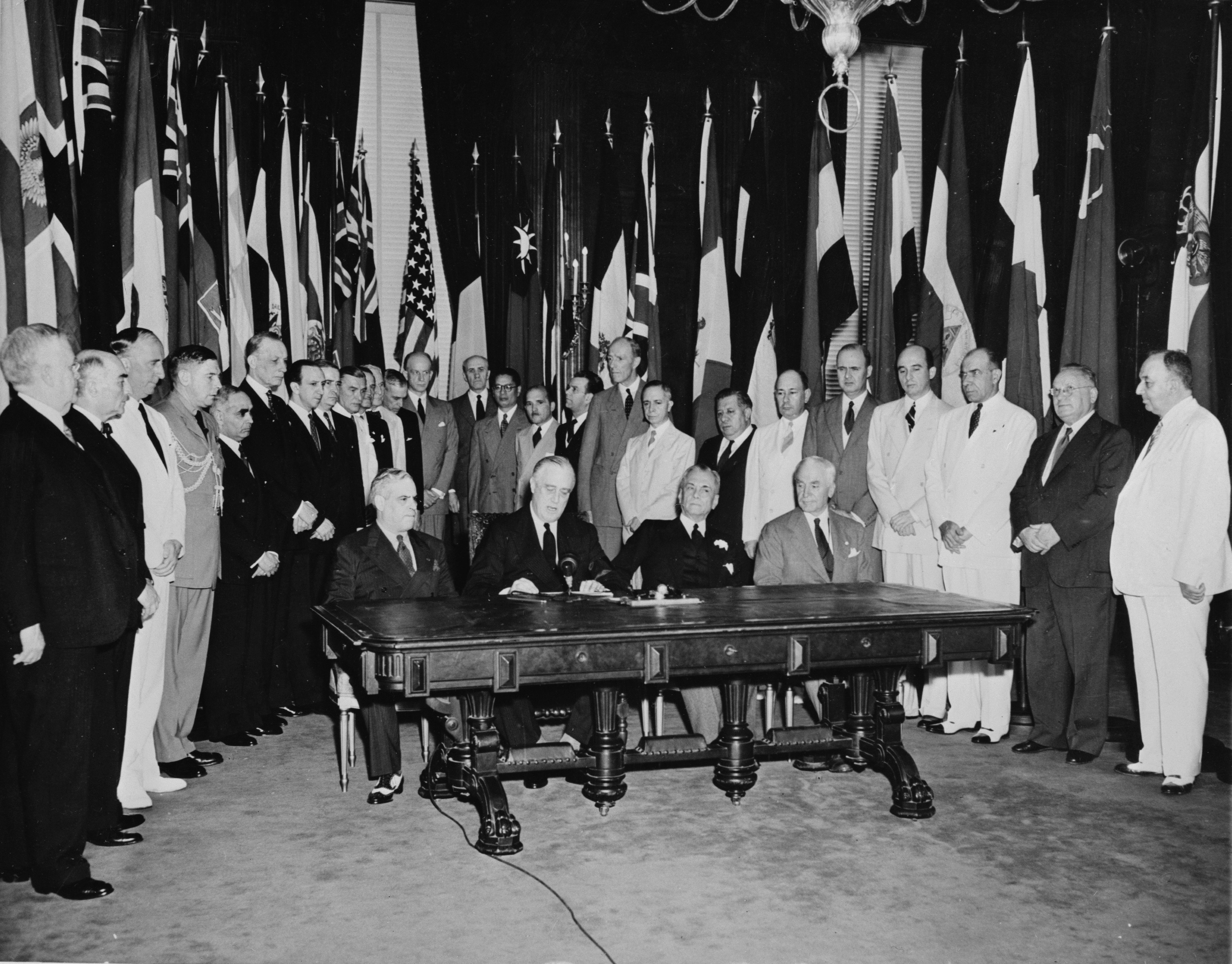
The 26 United Nations representatives in July 1942. Seated, left to right: Francisco Castillo Nájera, Franklin D. Roosevelt, Manuel L. Quezon, and Secretary Hull.

Hull was the underlying force and architect in the creation of the United Nations, as recognized by the 1945 Nobel Peace Prize, an honor for which Roosevelt nominated him. During World War II, Hull and Roosevelt had worked toward the development of a world organization to prevent a third World War. Hull and his staff drafted the "Charter of the United Nations" in mid-1943.

== Later years ==
Hull resigned on November 30, 1944, due to failing health. To this day he remains the longest-serving US Secretary of State, having served for eleven years and nine months in the post. Roosevelt described Hull upon his departure as "the one person in all the world who has done his most to make this great plan for peace (the United Nations) an effective fact". The Norwegian Nobel Committee honored Hull with the Nobel Peace Prize in 1945 in recognition of his efforts for peace and understanding in the Western Hemisphere, his trade agreements, and his work to establish the United Nations.

In January 1948, Hull published his two-volume memoirs, an excerpt from which appeared in The New York Times.

== Personal life and death ==
At the age of 45, in 1917, Hull married a widow, Rose Frances (Witz) Whitney (1875–1954), of an Austrian Jewish family of Staunton, Virginia. The couple had no children. Mrs. Hull died at age 79, in Staunton, Virginia, in 1954. She is buried in Washington D.C. at Washington National Cathedral.

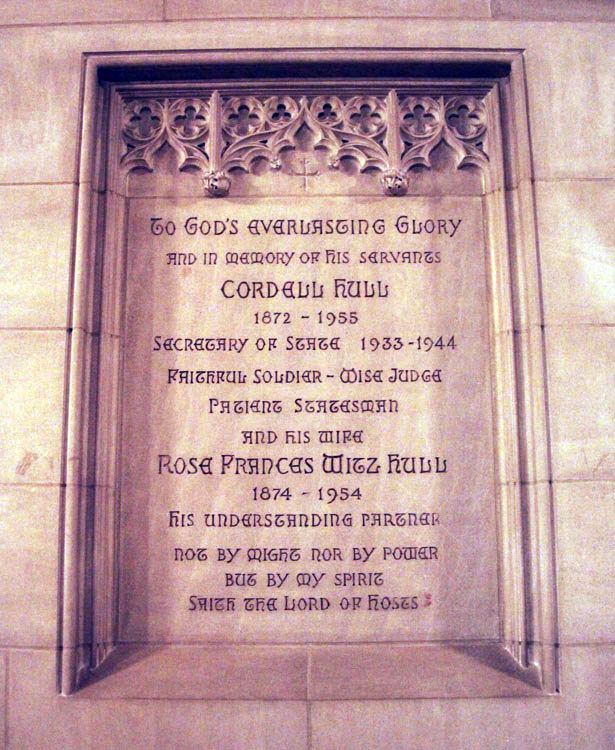
Gravesite of Cordell Hull at the St. Joseph of Arimathea Chapel, in Washington National Cathedral Church.

Hull died on July 23, 1955, at age 83, at his home in Washington, D.C., after a lifelong struggle with familial remitting-relapsing sarcoidosis (often confused with tuberculosis). He is buried in the vault of the Chapel of St. Joseph of Arimathea in the Washington National Cathedral.

== Legacy ==
Hull's memory is preserved by Cordell Hull Dam on the Cumberland River near Carthage, Tennessee. The dam impounds Cordell Hull Lake, covering approximately 12,000 acres (49 km^{2}).

His law school, Cumberland School of Law, continues to honor him with a Cordell Hull Speaker's Forum and the Moot Court Room.

A statue of Hull graces the campus of Cumberland University in Lebanon, Tennessee.

Cordell Hull Birthplace State Park, near Byrdstown, Tennessee, was established in 1997 to preserve Hull's birthplace and various personal effects Hull had donated to the citizens of Pickett County, including his Nobel Peace Prize.

A segment of Kentucky highway routes 70, 90, 63, and 163, from Mammoth Cave National Park near Cave City south to the Tennessee State Line near Hestand, is named "Cordell Hull Highway", and is part of that state's scenic byway system.

The Cordell Hull Building, on Capitol Hill in Nashville, Tennessee, is a secure 10-story building that contains the offices of the Tennessee Legislature.

The Eisenhower Executive Office Building (formerly the Old Executive Office Building) in Washington, DC, next to the White House, contains the ornately decorated "Cordell Hull Room" on the second floor, which is used for meetings. The room was Cordell Hull's office when he served as U.S. Secretary of State.

Cordell Hull Park, located at 13415 Warren Avenue in the East Garrison neighborhood, an unincorporated area of Monterey County, California, is approximately 0.75-acre (3,000 m^{2}) in size and contains a basketball court, playground, and a grassy playfield.

The U.S. Postal Service issued a 5-cent commemorative stamp honoring Cordell Hull on October 5, 1963.

Hull is one of the presidential cabinet members who are characters in the musical Annie.

== See also ==
- List of United States Cabinet members who have served more than eight years

== General and cited sources ==
=== Primary ===
- Memoirs (Jan. 1948)
  - Vol. I, Vol. II
- The Papers of Cordell Hull.

=== Secondary ===
- Bix, Herbert (2000). Hirohito And The Making Of Modern Japan. New York: HarperCollins. ISBN 006019314X.
- Cox, Graham (2019). Seeking Justice for the Holocaust Herbert C. Pell, Franklin D. Roosevelt, and the Limits of International Law. Oklahoma City: University of Oklahoma Press. ISBN 9780806165967.
- Dallek, Robert (1979). Franklin D. Roosevelt and American Foreign Policy, 1932–1945. Oxford University Press.
- Pratt, Julius W. (1964). Cordell Hull, 1933–44, 2 vol.
- Biography at U.S. Congress
- Butler, Michael A. (1998), Cautious Visionary: Cordell Hull and Trade Reform, 1933–1937, Kent, Ohio: Kent State University Press, ISBN 978-0873385961.
- Kennedy, David (1999). Freedom From Fear The American People in Depressiion and War 1929-1945. Oxford: Oxford University Press.
- O'Sullivan, Christopher D., and Sumner Welles (2008). Postwar Planning and the Quest for a New World Order. Columbia University Press. ISBN 0231142587.
- Gellman, Irwin F (1995). Secret Affairs: FDR, Cordell Hull, and Sumner Welles. New York: Enigma Books. ISBN 978-1929631117..
- Robertson, Charles Langner. "The American Secretary of State: A Study of the Office Under Henry L. Stimson And Cordell Hull." (PhD dissertation, Princeton University; ProQuest Dissertations Publishing, 1959. 6005044).
- Pratt, Julius (January 1966). "The Ordeal of Cordell Hull". The Review of Politics. 28 (1): 76–98.
- Shipley White, Dorothy (1964). Seeds of Discord De Gaulle, the Free French and the Allies. Syracuse: :Syracuse University Press.
- Stanley, Judith M. (Summer 1973). "Cordell Hull and Democratic Party Unity". Tennessee Historical Quarterly. 32 (2): 169–187.
- Schatz, Arthur W. (June 1970). "The Anglo-American Trade Agreement and Cordell Hull's Search for Peace 1936-1938". The Journal of American History. 57 (1): 85–103.
- Wolton, Susan (2000). Lord Hailey, the Colonial Office and Politics of Race and Empire in the Second World War The Loss of White Prestige. London: : Palgrave Macmillan. ISBN 9780230514768.
- Woolner, David B. (1996). "The Frustrated Idealists: Cordell Hull, Anthony Eden and the Search for Anglo-American Cooperation, 1933– 1938" (PhD dissertation). McGill University.

U.S. House of Representatives
Preceded by Mounce Gore Butler	Member of the U.S. House of Representatives from Tennessee's 4th congressional district 1907–1921	Succeeded by Wynne F. Clouse
Preceded by Wynne F. Clouse	Member of the U.S. House of Representatives from Tennessee's 4th congressional district 1923–1931	Succeeded by John R. Mitchell
Party political offices
Preceded by George White	Chair of the Democratic National Committee; 1921–1924	Succeeded by Clem L. Shaver
Preceded by William Emerson Brock	Democratic nominee for U.S. Senator from Tennessee (Class 2); 1930	Succeeded by Nathan L. Bachman
U.S. Senate
Preceded by William Emerson Brock	U.S. Senator (Class 2) from Tennessee; 1931–1933; Served alongside: Kenneth McKellar	Succeeded by Nathan L. Bachman
Political offices
Preceded by Henry L. Stimson	United States Secretary of State; 1933–1944	Succeeded by Edward Stettinius Jr.
Awards and achievements
Preceded by International Committee of the Red Cross	Laureate of the Nobel Peace Prize; 1945	Succeeded by Emily Greene Balch; John Mott
