= Pickett County, Tennessee =

County in Tennessee, United States

- County
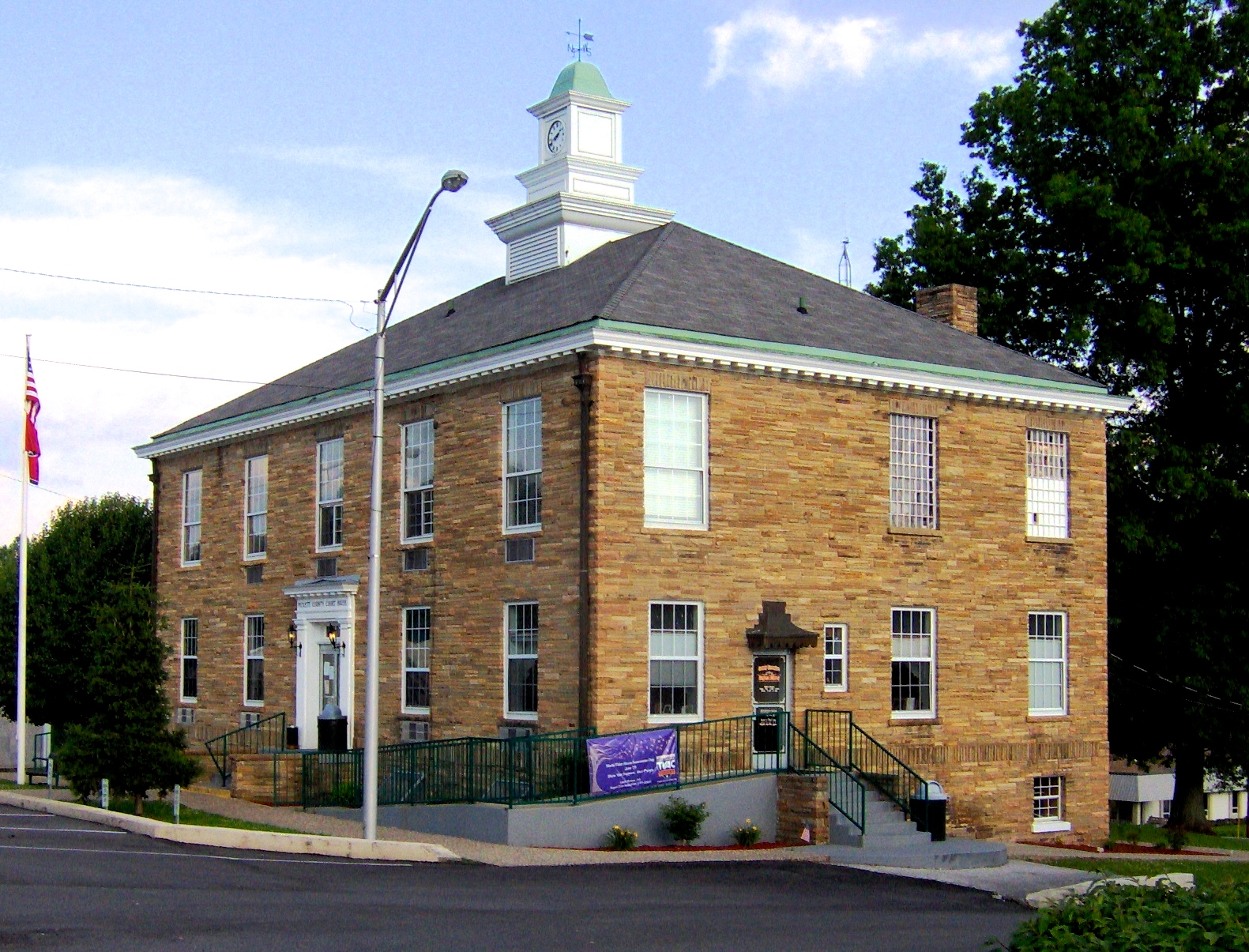
- Pickett County Courthouse in Byrdstown

- Location within the U.S. state of Tennessee
- Coordinates: 36°34′N 85°05′W
- Country: United States
- State: Tennessee
- Founded: 1879
- Named for: Howard L. Pickett, state legislator
- Seat: Byrdstown
- Largest town: Byrdstown

Area
  - Total: 174 sq mi (450 km^{2})
  - Land: 163 sq mi (420 km^{2})
  - Water: 12 sq mi (31 km^{2}) 6.6%

Population (2020)
  - Total: 5,001
  - Estimate (2025): 5,219 ▲
  - Density: 31/sq mi (12/km^{2})
- Time zone: UTC−6 (Central)
  - Summer (DST): UTC−5 (CDT)
- Congressional district: 6th

Pickett County is a county located in the U.S. state of Tennessee. As of the 2020 census, the population was 5,001, making it the least populous county in Tennessee. Its county seat is Byrdstown. The city of Byrdstown and the Kentucky town of Albany, 11 miles (18 km) to the northeast, are positioned between two Army Corps of Engineers lakes: Dale Hollow Lake, mainly in Tennessee, and Lake Cumberland, in Kentucky. The area is known as "Twin Lakes" and Byrdstown is noted as "The Gateway To Dale Hollow Lake". Every year thousands of people vacation at the many resorts situated along the lakes.

== History ==
Pickett County was created in 1879 from sections of Overton and Fentress counties. It was named for Howell Lester Pickett (1847 - 1914), a member of the state legislature representing Wilson County who had been instrumental in the county's formation. Nobel Peace Prize winner Cordell Hull had been born in one of the parcels of land set aside to create the new county. Hull would be honored for his role in organizing the World War II diplomatic alliance that became the United Nations.

== Geography ==
According to the U.S. Census Bureau, the county has a total area of 174 square miles (450 km^{2}), of which 163 square miles (420 km^{2}) is land and 12 square miles (31 km^{2}) (6.6%) is water. It is the fourth-smallest county in Tennessee by land area and third-smallest by total area. The eastern part of the county, much of which is part of Pickett State Forest, lies atop the Cumberland Plateau, while the western, more populated half is located on the Highland Rim. The Wolf River and the Obey River, the lower parts of which are part of Dale Hollow Lake, pass through the county. The rivers converge just west of the county's border with Clay County.

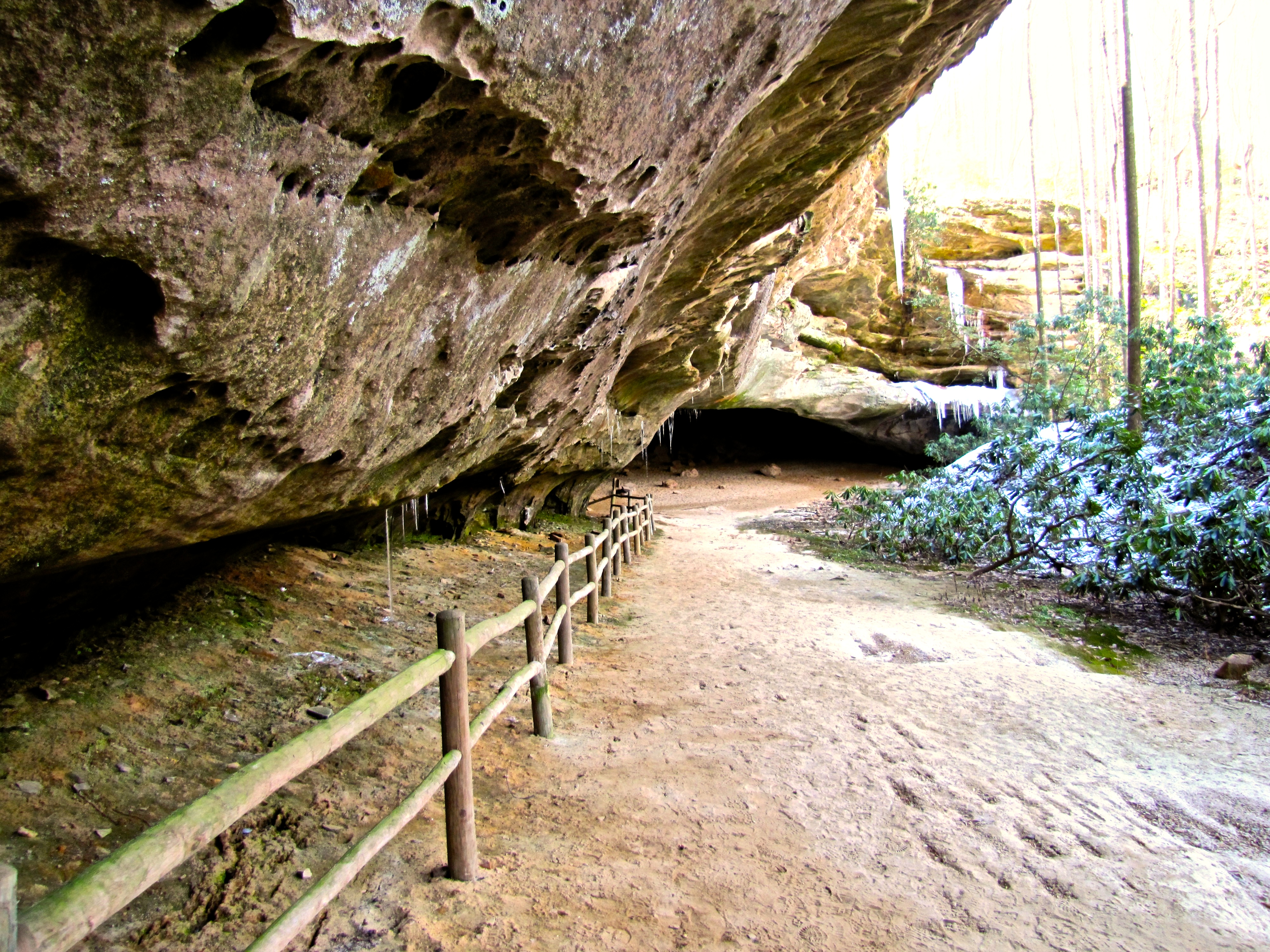
Hazard Cave at Pickett State Park

Streams in the far eastern section of the county are part of the watershed of the Big South Fork of the Cumberland River.

The county is in the Central Time Zone, but the bordering counties of Scott County, Tennessee, and Wayne County, Kentucky, observe Eastern Time Zone.

=== Adjacent counties ===
- Wayne County, Kentucky (northeast)
- Scott County (east)
- Fentress County (southeast)
- Overton County (southwest)
- Clay County (west)
- Clinton County, Kentucky (north)

=== National protected area ===
- Big South Fork National River and Recreation Area (very small part)

=== State protected areas ===
- Cordell Hull Birthplace State Park
- Honey Creek State Natural Area
- Pickett State Forest (part)
- Pickett CCC Memorial State Park
- Twin Arches State Natural Area (part)

=== Highways ===
- US 127
- SR 111
- SR 154
- SR 295
- SR 325

== Demographics ==
Historical population
Census	Pop.	Note	%±
1890	4,736		—
1900	5,366		13.3%
1910	5,087		−5.2%
1920	5,205		2.3%
1930	5,615		7.9%
1940	6,213		10.7%
1950	5,093		−18.0%
1960	4,431		−13.0%
1970	3,774		−14.8%
1980	4,358		15.5%
1990	4,548		4.4%
2000	4,945		8.7%
2010	5,077		2.7%
2020	5,001		−1.5%
2025 (est.)	5,219	▲	4.4%
U.S. Decennial Census; 1790-1960 1900-1990; 1990-2000 2010-2020 2020

=== Racial and ethnic composition ===
Pickett County, Tennessee – Racial and ethnic composition Note: the US Census treats Hispanic/Latino as an ethnic category. This table excludes Latinos from the racial categories and assigns them to a separate category. Hispanics/Latinos may be of any race.
Race / ethnicity (NH = Non-Hispanic)	Pop 1980	Pop 1990	Pop 2000	Pop 2010	Pop 2020	% 1980	% 1990	% 2000	% 2010	% 2020
White alone (NH)	4,307	4,529	4,870	4,964	4,811	98.83%	99.58%	98.48%	97.77%	96.20%
Black or African American alone (NH)	1	0	5	5	8	0.02%	0.00%	0.10%	0.10%	0.16%
Native American or Alaska Native alone (NH)	16	4	8	11	8	0.37%	0.09%	0.16%	0.22%	0.16%
Asian alone (NH)	1	2	2	4	15	0.02%	0.04%	0.04%	0.08%	0.30%
Native Hawaiian or Pacific Islander alone (NH)	x	x	0	0	1	x	x	0.00%	0.00%	0.02%
Other race alone (NH)	0	0	0	0	5	0.00%	0.00%	0.00%	0.00%	0.10%
Mixed race or Multiracial (NH)	x	x	19	26	70	x	x	0.38%	0.51%	1.40%
Hispanic or Latino (any race)	33	13	41	67	83	0.76%	0.29%	0.83%	1.32%	1.66%
Total	4,358	4,548	4,945	5,077	5,001	100.00%	100.00%	100.00%	100.00%	100.00%

=== 2020 census ===
As of the 2020 census, there were 5,001 people, 2,192 households, and 1,600 families residing in the county. The median age was 51.1 years, with 18.2% of residents under the age of 18 and 27.9% who were 65 years of age or older. For every 100 females there were 98.1 males, and for every 100 females age 18 and over there were 97.9 males age 18 and over.

Of the county's 2,192 households, 23.3% had children under the age of 18 living in them. Of all households, 51.4% were married-couple households, 19.8% were households with a male householder and no spouse or partner present, and 23.9% were households with a female householder and no spouse or partner present. About 30.8% of all households were made up of individuals and 17.6% had someone living alone who was 65 years of age or older.

There were 3,342 housing units, of which 34.4% were vacant. Among occupied housing units, 82.3% were owner-occupied and 17.7% were renter-occupied. The homeowner vacancy rate was 1.6% and the rental vacancy rate was 15.7%.

The racial makeup of the county was 4,811 White (non-Hispanic) residents (96.2%), 8 Black or African American residents (0.16%), 8 Native American residents (0.16%), 15 Asian residents (0.3%), 1 Pacific Islander resident (0.02%), 75 residents of other or mixed race (1.5%), and 83 Hispanic or Latino residents of any race (1.66%).

<0.1% of residents lived in urban areas, while 100.0% lived in rural areas.

=== 2000 census ===
As of the census of 2000, there were 4,945 people, 2,091 households, and 1,461 families residing in the county. The population density was 30 people per square mile (12 people/km^{2}). There were 2,956 housing units at an average density of 18 units per square mile (6.9/km^{2}). The racial makeup of the county was 99.15% White, 0.10% Black or African American, 0.16% Native American, 0.04% Asian, 0.10% from other races, and 0.44% from two or more races. 0.83% of the population were Hispanic or Latino of any race.

There were 2,091 households, out of which 27.40% had children under the age of 18 living with them, 58.30% were married couples living together, 7.80% had a female householder with no husband present, and 30.10% were non-families. 27.20% of all households were made up of individuals, and 12.90% had someone living alone who was 65 years of age or older. The average household size was 2.33 and the average family size was 2.83.

In the county, the population was spread out, with 21.40% under the age of 18, 8.60% from 18 to 24, 24.70% from 25 to 44, 27.70% from 45 to 64, and 17.80% who were 65 years of age or older. The median age was 42 years. For every 100 females there were 96.80 males. For every 100 females age 18 and over, there were 94.20 males.

The median income for a household in the county was $24,673, and the median income for a family was $31,355. Males had a median income of $22,367 versus $17,173 for females. The per capita income for the county was $14,681. About 12.00% of families and 15.60% of the population were below the poverty line, including 19.40% of those under age 18 and 20.00% of those age 65 or over.

== Education ==
- Pickett County High School – High school
- Pickett County K–8 – Elementary school/Junior high school

== Communities ==
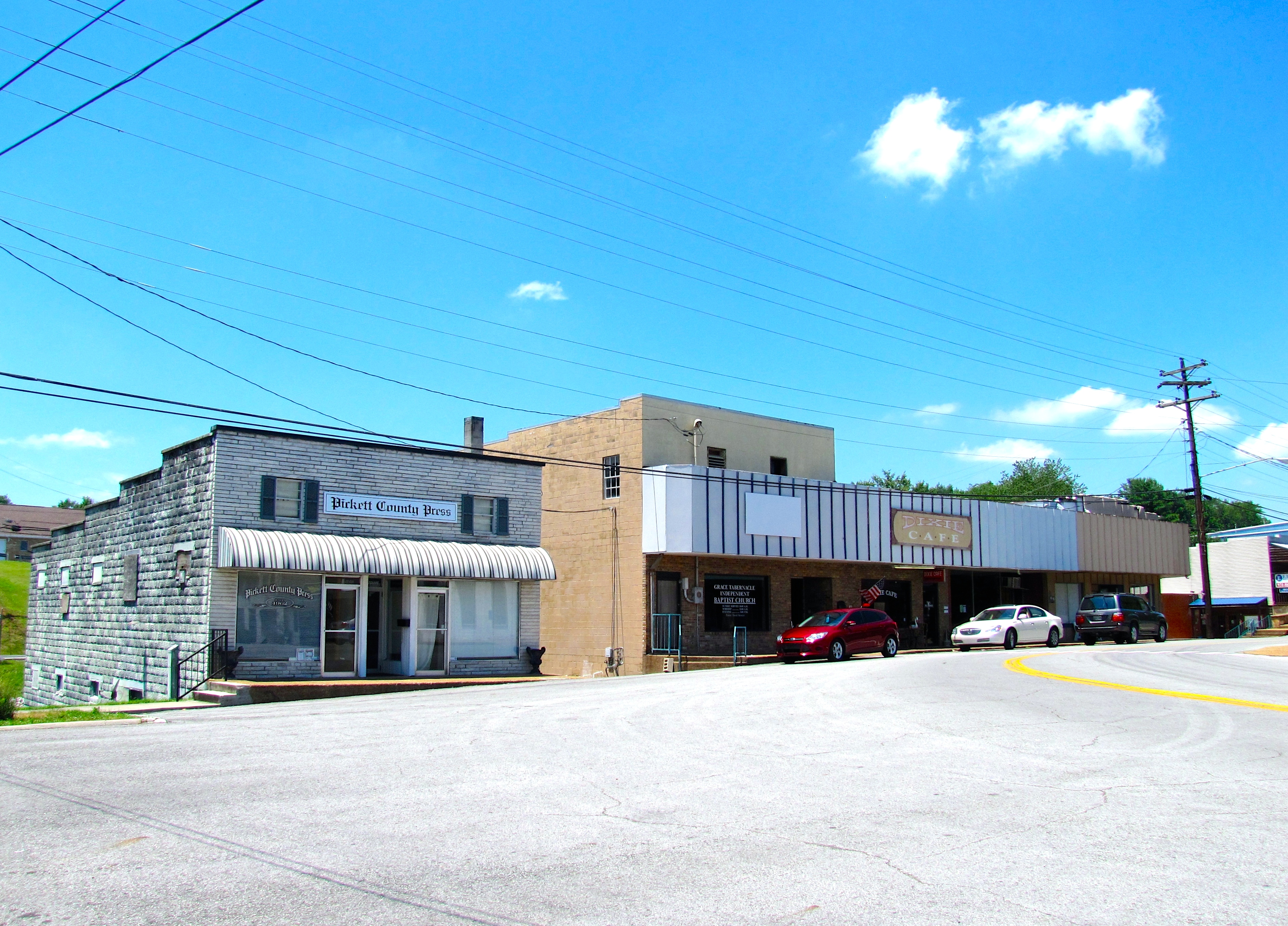
Main Street in Byrdstown

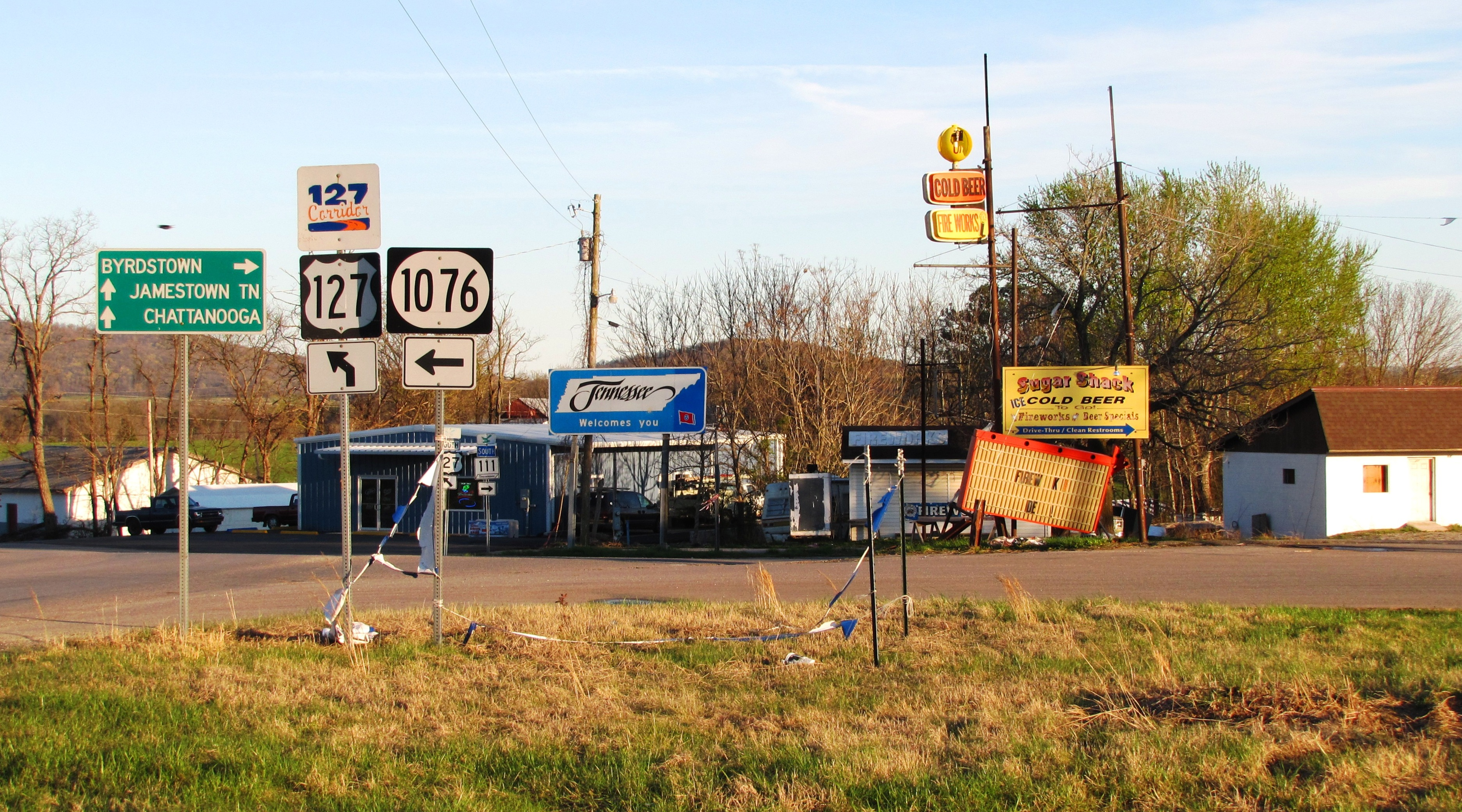
Static, at the Tennessee-Kentucky state line

=== Town ===
- Byrdstown (county seat)

=== Unincorporated communities ===
- Boom
- Cedar Grove
- Love Lady
- Midway
- Moodyville
- Static

=== Ghost town ===
- Olympus

== Politics ==
Along with Macon County and Fentress County, Pickett County constitutes an outlier in Tennessee politics as it is a historically Republican county in a region (Middle Tennessee) that was overwhelmingly Democratic up until recent years. Since its founding, Republicans have carried the county in every presidential election, with the only exceptions being Franklin D. Roosevelt in 1932, and Woodrow Wilson and Bill Clinton in the split 1912 and 1992 elections (with Tennessee son Al Gore on the Democratic ticket), respectively.

United States presidential election results for Pickett County, Tennessee
Year	Republican		Democratic		Third party(ies)	
Year	No.	%	No.	%	No.	%
1912	355	39.44%	411	45.67%	134	14.89%
1916	501	54.52%	418	45.48%	0	0.00%
1920	896	59.61%	607	40.39%	0	0.00%
1924	676	51.06%	643	48.56%	5	0.38%
1928	745	65.70%	382	33.69%	7	0.62%
1932	681	48.09%	712	50.28%	23	1.62%
1936	651	58.13%	454	40.54%	15	1.34%
1940	830	55.63%	652	43.70%	10	0.67%
1944	761	63.52%	416	34.72%	21	1.75%
1948	849	59.08%	566	39.39%	22	1.53%
1952	1,003	64.71%	547	35.29%	0	0.00%
1956	985	63.30%	560	35.99%	11	0.71%
1960	1,154	67.05%	567	32.95%	0	0.00%
1964	935	56.22%	728	43.78%	0	0.00%
1968	884	59.41%	405	27.22%	199	13.37%
1972	957	72.23%	357	26.94%	11	0.83%
1976	986	50.72%	948	48.77%	10	0.51%
1980	1,319	62.75%	758	36.06%	25	1.19%
1984	1,246	63.67%	706	36.08%	5	0.26%
1988	1,118	63.67%	634	36.10%	4	0.23%
1992	1,094	46.20%	1,144	48.31%	130	5.49%
1996	1,046	50.51%	901	43.51%	124	5.99%
2000	1,281	57.21%	939	41.94%	19	0.85%
2004	1,600	60.49%	1,033	39.05%	12	0.45%
2008	1,786	66.87%	854	31.97%	31	1.16%
2012	1,712	69.79%	712	29.03%	29	1.18%
2016	2,021	77.28%	536	20.50%	58	2.22%
2020	2,381	81.24%	525	17.91%	25	0.85%
2024	2,441	82.63%	487	16.49%	26	0.88%

== See also ==
- National Register of Historic Places listings in Pickett County, Tennessee
