= Cedar Grove, Pickett County, Tennessee =

Cedar Grove, Tennessee
- Unincorporated community
- Location within Tennessee Location within the United States
- Coordinates: 36°33′26″N 85°03′22″W
- Country: United States
- State: Tennessee
- County: Pickett
- Elevation: 1,027 ft (313 m)
- Time zone: UTC-6 (Central (CST))
  - Summer (DST): UTC-5 (CDT)
- Area code: 931
- GNIS feature ID: 1280030

Cedar Grove is an unincorporated community in Pickett County, Tennessee, United States. Cedar Grove is located along Cedar Grove Road 4.2 miles (6.8 km) east-southeast of Byrdstown.
