= 1930 United States Senate elections in Tennessee =

The 1930 United States Senate special election in Tennessee took place on November 4, 1930, concurrently with other elections to the United States Senate as well as elections to the United States House of Representatives and various state and local elections. The special election came upon the death of incumbent Democratic Senator Lawrence D. Tyson. Democratic Governor Henry Hollis Horton appointed William E. Brock.

In the special election, Brock was elected to fulfill the balance of Tyson's term, but he did not run for the full six-year term that was on the ballot at the same time, and his service as a U.S. senator ended on March 3, 1931. He was succeeded by Cordell Hull who won the succeeding term ballot.

== Special election ==
1930 United States Senate special election in Tennessee
- November 4, 1930
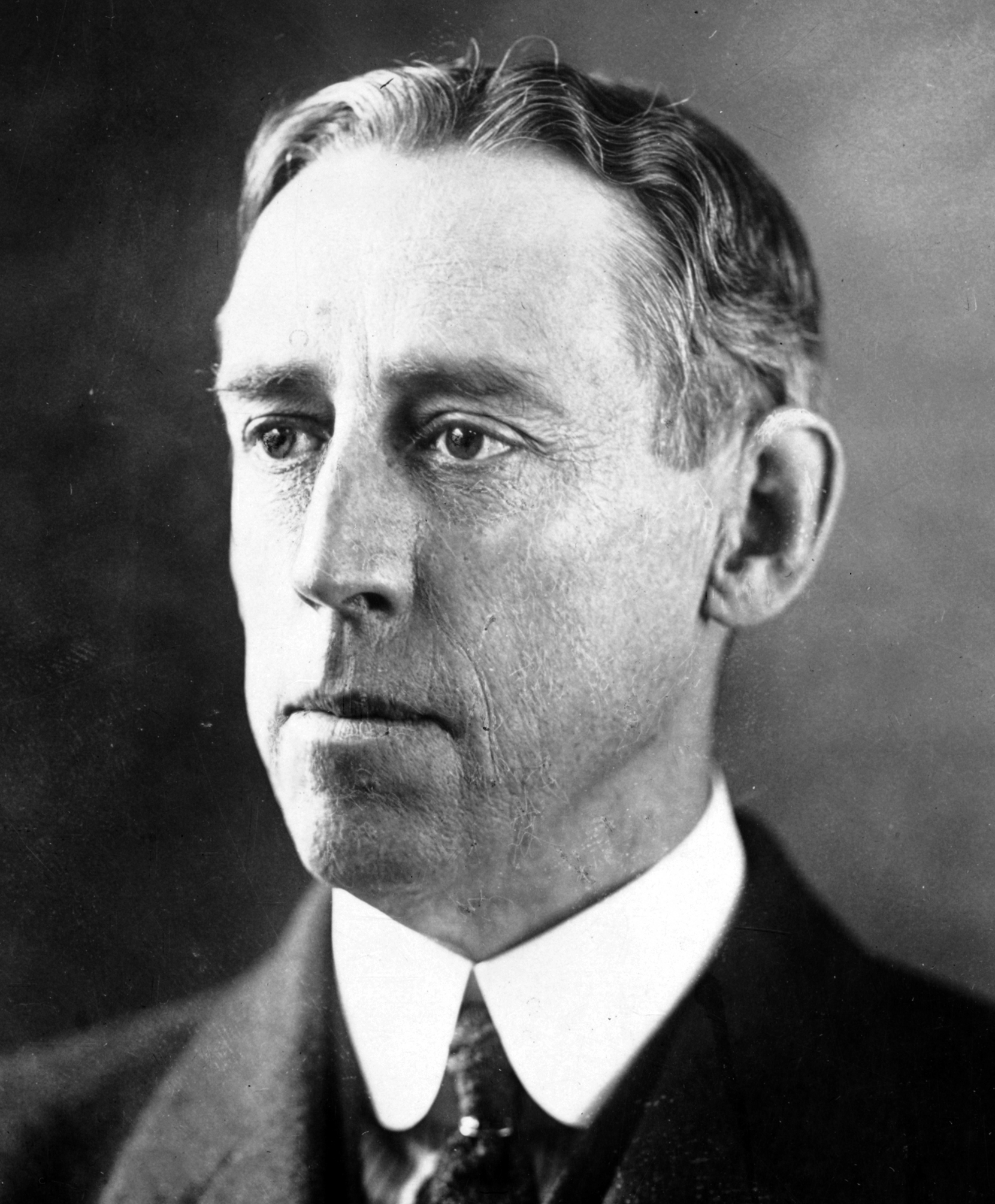

Nominee	William E. Brock	F. Todd Meacham
Party	Democratic	Republican
Popular vote	144,019	49,554
Percentage	74.40%	25.60%
- County results Brock: 50–60% 60–70% 70–80% 80–90% >90% Meacham: 50–60%
Senator before election
William E. Brock
Democratic
Elected Senator
William E. Brock
Democratic

=== Democratic primary ===
==== Candidates ====
- William E. Brock, incumbent senator
- John Randolph Neal Jr., attorney, law professor, politician, and activist

Special Democratic primary (August 7, 1930)
Party	Candidate	Votes	%
Democratic	William E. Brock (incumbent)	113,492	70.67
Democratic	John Randolph Neal Jr.	47,110	29.33
Majority		66,382	41.33
Turnout		160,602	6.14

=== General election ===
Tennessee special election
Party	Candidate	Votes	%
Democratic	William E. Brock (incumbent)	144,019	74.40
Republican	F. Todd Meacham	49,554	25.60
Majority		94,465	48.80
Turnout		193,573	
Democratic hold			

== Regular election ==
1930 United States Senate election in Tennessee
- November 4, 1930
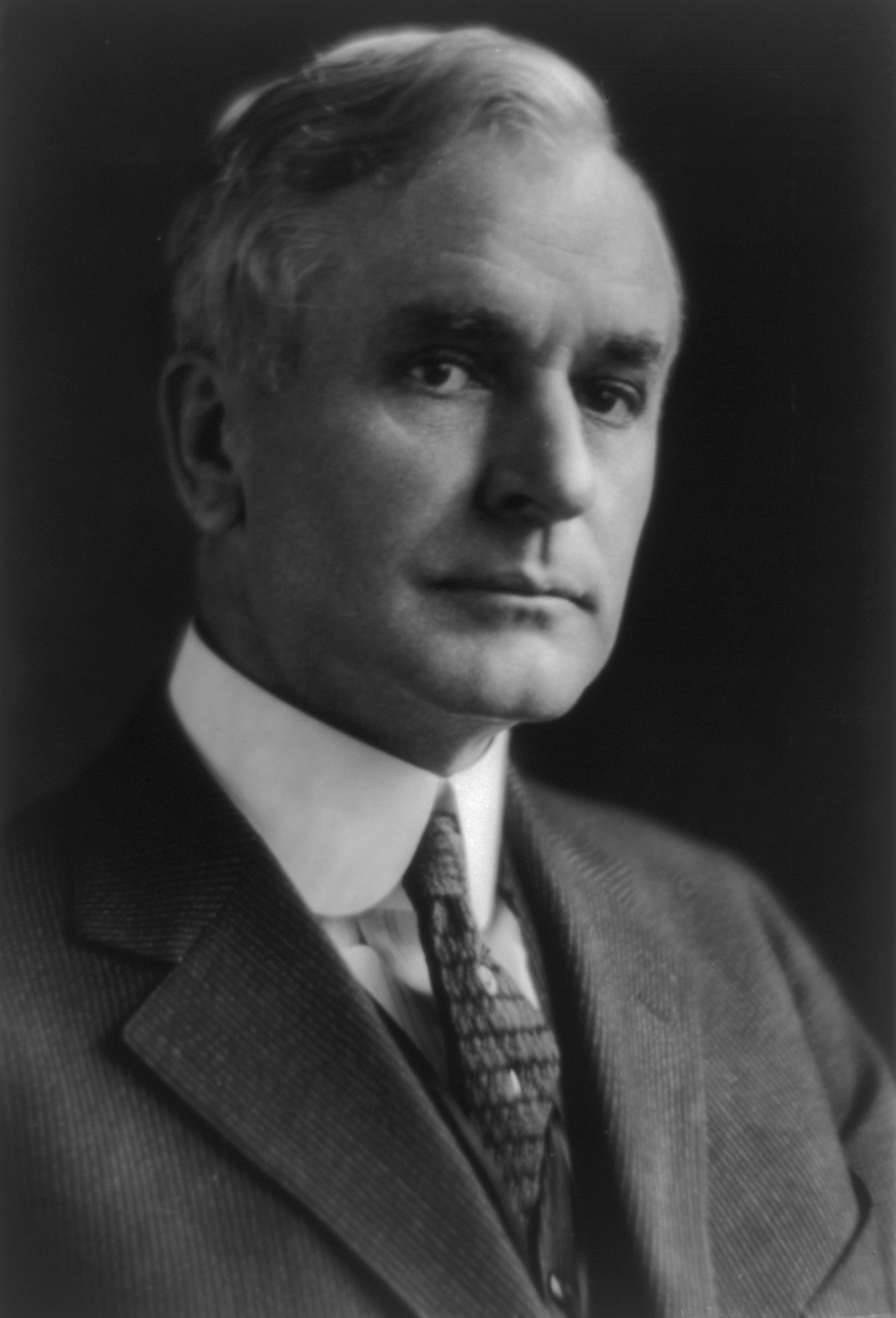

Nominee	Cordell Hull	Paul E. Divine
Party	Democratic	Republican
Popular vote	154,131	58,650
Percentage	71.30%	27.13%
- County results Hull: 40–50% 50–60% 60–70% 70–80% 80–90% >90% Divine: 50–60% 60–70% 70–80% 80–90%
Senator before election
William E. Brock
Democratic
Elected Senator
Cordell Hull
Democratic

=== General election ===
Tennessee regular election
Party	Candidate	Votes	%
Democratic	Cordell Hull	154,131	71.30
Republican	Paul E. Divine	58,650	27.13
Communist	Sherman Bell	3,392	1.57
Majority		95,481	44.17
Turnout		216,173	
Democratic hold			

== See also ==
- 1930 United States Senate elections
- 1930 Tennessee gubernatorial election
