= Love Lady, Tennessee =

Lovelady
- Unincorporated community
- Location within the state of Tennessee Lovelady (the United States)
- Coordinates: 36°35′21″N 85°9′34″W
- Country: United States
- State: Tennessee
- County: Pickett
- Elevation: 1,024 ft (312 m)
- Time zone: UTC-6 (Central (CST))
  - Summer (DST): UTC-5 (CDT)
- GNIS feature ID: 1292126

Lovelady is an unincorporated community in Pickett County, Tennessee, United States. It lies near State Route 111 west of the town of Byrdstown, the county seat of Pickett County. Its elevation is 1,027 feet (313 m).
