= Midway, Pickett County, Tennessee =

Midway
- Unincorporated community
- Location within the state of Tennessee Midway (the United States)
- Coordinates: 36°30′0″N 85°10′41″W
- Country: United States
- State: Tennessee
- County: Pickett
- Elevation: 1,007 ft (307 m)
- Time zone: UTC-6 (Central (CST))
  - Summer (DST): UTC-5 (CDT)
- GNIS feature ID: 1315503

Midway is an unincorporated community in Pickett County, Tennessee, United States.

Midway is located within Monroe's zip code.
