= William E. Brock =

American politician (1869–1950)

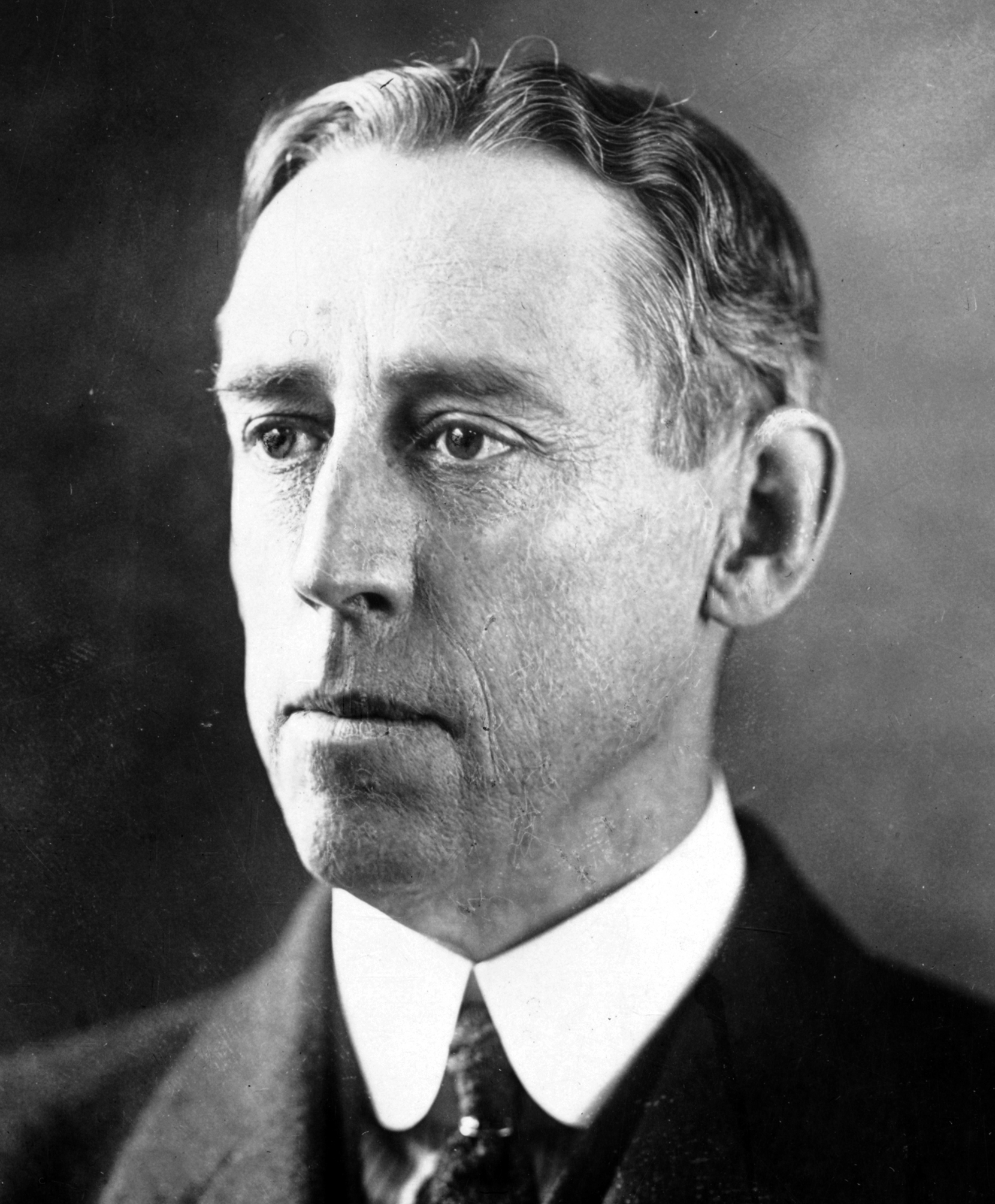

United States Senator from Tennessee
- In office September 2, 1929 – March 3, 1931
- Appointed by: Henry Hollis Horton
- Preceded by: Lawrence Tyson
- Succeeded by: Cordell Hull

Personal details
- Born: March 14, 1869 Mocksville, North Carolina, US
- Died: August 5, 1950 (aged 81) Chattanooga, Tennessee, US
- Party: Democratic
- Relations: Bill Brock (grandson)

William Emerson Brock (March 14, 1869 – August 5, 1950) was a Democratic United States senator from Tennessee from 1929 to 1931.

== Early life and education ==
Brock was born in Davie County, North Carolina, the son of Mary Ann (Howell) and Richard Emerson Brock. He attended public school and engaged in agricultural pursuits until 1894. He then moved to Winston-Salem, North Carolina, and became a clerk in a general store.

== Career ==
From 1896 until 1901 he worked as a tobacco salesman. In 1909 he moved to Chattanooga, Tennessee. In Chattanooga, Brock became involved in candy manufacturing, and also had involvements in insurance and banking interests. He became a trustee of the former University of Chattanooga, now the University of Tennessee at Chattanooga, Emory and Henry University, and also Martha Washington College.

On September 2, 1929, the Governor of Tennessee, Henry Hollis Horton, appointed Brock to the vacancy in the U.S. Senate caused by the death of Lawrence D. Tyson; Horton had first offered the appointment to former Senator Luke Lea, who declined. On November 4, 1930, Brock was elected to the balance of this term. He did not run for the full six-year term that was on the ballot at the same time, and his service as a U.S. senator ended on March 3, 1931. He was succeeded by Cordell Hull.

== Later life and death ==
After leaving the Senate, Brock returned to his Chattanooga candy manufacturing business and remained involved in its operation until his death in 1950. He was buried at Forest Hills Cemetery in Chattanooga.

== Personal life ==
Brock's grandson, Bill Brock, was a Republican member of the U.S. House of Representatives and a U.S. senator from Tennessee.

Party political offices
Preceded by Lawrence Tyson	Democratic nominee for U.S. Senator from Tennessee (Class 2); 1930	Succeeded by Cordell Hull
U.S. Senate
Preceded by Lawrence D. Tyson	U.S. senator (Class 2) from Tennessee; 1929–1931; Served alongside: Kenneth D. McKellar	Succeeded by Cordell Hull
