= Moodyville, Tennessee =

Moodyville
- Unincorporated community
- Location within the state of Tennessee Moodyville (the United States)
- Coordinates: 36°32′17″N 85°4′31″W
- Country: United States
- State: Tennessee
- County: Pickett
- Elevation: 1,014 ft (309 m)
- Time zone: UTC-6 (Central (CST))
  - Summer (DST): UTC-5 (CDT)
- GNIS feature ID: 1294218

Moodyville is an unincorporated community in Pickett County, Tennessee, United States. Its elevation is 1,010 feet (308 m). A post office was once located at Moodyville, but it has since closed.
