= Olympus, Tennessee =

Former unincorporated community in Tennessee, United States

Coordinates: 36.581978°N 85.183489°W

Olympus was a community in Pickett County, Tennessee, that was once the site of a post office and was the birthplace of U.S. Secretary of State Cordell Hull.

== History ==
Olympus was first established as a post office in 1834, when the community was part of Overton County. The post office was discontinued and reestablished several times in the ensuing decades until it was finally discontinued for the last time in 1907.

The Olympus post office was at different locations at different times. At least one of the sites is now inundated by Dale Hollow Lake.
