= Boom, Tennessee =

Unincorporated community in Tennessee, US

Coordinates: 36°30′57″N 85°10′11″W

Boom is an unincorporated community in Pickett County, Tennessee.

== History ==
A post office called Boom was established in 1904, and remained in operation until 1955. The community was so named on account of a nearby log boom.
