= Tennessee State Route 141 =

State highway in Tennessee, United States

State Route 141
- SR 141 highlighted in red

Route information
- Maintained by TDOT
- Length: 67.0 mi (107.8 km)

Major junctions
- North end: SR 52 near Westmoreland
- SR 10 / SR 25 in Hartsville; US 70 / US 70N in Lebanon; I-40 in New Middleton; SR 53 / SR 264 in Gordonsville
- East end: SR 56 in Silver Point

Location
- Country: United States
- State: Tennessee
- Counties: Macon, Trousdale, Wilson, Smith, DeKalb, Putnam

Highway system
- Tennessee State Routes; Interstate; US; State
← SR 140	→ SR 142

State Route 141 (SR 141) is an east–west highway in Middle Tennessee. The road begins southeast of Westmoreland and ends in Silver Point. The current length is 67.0 mi (107.8 km).

SR 141 is one of very few state routes in Tennessee that actually changes its cardinal directions, from north–south to east–west, which happens in Lebanon at the second intersection with US 70.

== Route description ==
=== Macon County ===
SR 141 begins in Macon County at an intersection with SR 52 southeast of Westmoreland. It goes southward as Green Grove Road and passes through the mountains of the Highland Rim before entering farmland and crossing into Trousdale County.

=== Trousdale County ===
SR 141 continues southeast and has an intersection with SR 260 before entering Hartsville. The highway then runs a short concurrency with SR 10 and SR 25 before turning south again as Broadway toward downtown Hartsville. In downtown, SR 141 turns east for two blocks as East Main Street then once again turns south as River Street upon leaving Hartsville. After leaving Hartsville, SR 141 crosses the Cumberland River and is briefly known only as Highway 141 before crossing into Wilson County.

=== Wilson County ===
SR 141, now known as Hartsville Pike, turns southwest and continues through farmland to enter Lebanon. The highway then passes through several neighborhoods before becoming concurrent with US 70/SR 26 as East High Street. They go east through a business district before turning south and coming to an intersection with the eastern end of US 70 Bus, the western end of US 70N, and SR 24. SR 141 then splits off of US 70/SR 26, where it switches cardinal directions from north–south to east–west, and heads east as Trousdale Ferry Pike while running parallel to I-40. The highway then passes through Tuckers Crossroads before crossing into Smith County.

=== Smith County ===
SR 141 then enters New Middleton and has an interchange with I-40 at Exit 254, where it moves to the south side of the Interstate and begins a concurrency with SR 53. SR 141/SR 53 runs closely parallel to the Interstate, crossing over the Interstate and then back under it before entering Gordonsville.

Upon entering Gordonsville, SR 141 ends its concurrency with SR 53 and starts one with SR 264. This concurrency continues east through town before ending east of town. SR 141 continues southeast, then south, and then southeast once again as it traverses rugged terrain. It then crosses Smith Fork Creek and enters the small community of Lancaster as the road is generally heading east. After leaving Lancaster, SR 141 abruptly turns south-southwestward and closely parallels the Caney Fork River as it enters DeKalb County.

=== DeKalb County ===
SR 141 continues generally southward until reaching Center Hill Dam. At this point, SR 141 starts a concurrency with SR 96. This concurrency turns northeastward and goes across the dam, then SR 96 splits off at a four-way intersection with Edgar Evins State Park Road and Medley-Amonette Road (SR 96). SR 141 continues east as Wolf Creek Road through hilly terrain before crossing into Putnam County.

=== Putnam County ===
SR 141, now known as Center Hill Dam Road, tops a hill onto the Highland Rim, before winding its way into Silver Point. SR 141 then passes through the center of the community before reaching its eastern terminus at SR 56, just feet from that highway's interchange with I-40 (Exit 273).

== Construction and improvements ==
A multi-phase improvement project for SR 141 began in 2023, consisting of roadway widening and construction of new alignments intended to improve regional connectivity and traffic flow between Lebanon and Hartsville.

The project is part of broader efforts to address congestion in eastern Wilson County due to population and commercial growth in the Lebanon area.

=== Phase 1 ===
Phase 1 includes widening existing portions of SR 141 and constructing a new alignment within Lebanon. The new alignment, completed in November 2025, extends from Oakdale Drive to US 70.

The roadway was constructed as a five-lane arterial road, including a center turn lane and sidewalks, replacing older two-lane segments. According to TDOT project documentation, the realignment was designed to improve traffic flow and road safety while reducing congestion on existing sections of Hartsville Pike.

Additional widening from Lovers Lane to Oakland Drive remains ongoing and is expected to be completed in December 2026. Upon completion, SR 141 will form a continuous five-lane corridor from Africa Lane to US 70.

=== Phase 2 ===
Phase 2 involves construction of approximately four miles (6.4 km) of new alignment from Cedar Bluff Road to the junction of SR 10 and SR 25 in Trousdale County.

The project includes a 1,700-foot (520 m) bridge over the Cumberland River and a 200-foot (61 m) bridge over SR 25.

Early planning documents describe the new alignment as a rural two-lane highway designed to improve regional connectivity between Wilson and Trousdale counties while reducing travel times between Lebanon and Hartsville.

Construction has included significant earthworks, bridge foundation work, and the installation of a temporary detour along SR 25 to maintain traffic flow during bridge construction.

Phase 2 is expected to be completed in July 2027.

=== Additional coverage ===
Local reporting from the Lebanon Democrat has highlighted the project’s role in improving traffic flow in eastern Lebanon, particularly along corridors affected by suburban expansion and commuter traffic into central Wilson County.

=== Hartsville bridge impacts ===
In late 2025, portions of the SR 141 improvement project in downtown Hartsville, Tennessee involved bridge work, lane closures, and temporary traffic shifts that affected access to local businesses. According to reporting by WKRN, several small business owners expressed concern that construction activities and traffic control measures made customer access difficult and posed a risk to their economic viability.

== Major intersections ==
County	Location	mi	km	Destinations	Notes
Macon		0.0	0.0	SR 52 (Highway 52 W) – Westmoreland, Lafayette	Northern terminus; SR 141 begins as a north-south highway
Trousdale		8.0	12.9	SR 260 west (Browning Branch Road)	Eastern terminus of SR 260
Trousdale	Hartsville	9.7	15.6	SR 10 south / SR 25 west (W McMurry Boulevard) – Castalian Springs, Gallatin	Northern end of SR 10/SR 25 concurrency
Trousdale	Hartsville	10.0	16.1	SR 10 north / SR 25 east (E McMurry Boulevard) – Lafayette, Carthage	Southern end of SR 10/SR 25 concurrency
Trousdale		12.0– 12.1	19.3– 19.5	Bridge over the Cumberland River	
Wilson	Lebanon	26.0	41.8	US 70 west (E High Street/SR 26 west) – Mount Juliet	Northern end of US 70/SR 26 concurrency
Wilson	Lebanon	26.5	42.6	US 70 Bus. west / US 70N east (E Main Street/Carthage Highway/SR 24) – Downtown, Carthage	Eastern terminus of US 70 Bus; western terminus of US 70N
Wilson	Lebanon	26.6	42.8	US 70 east (E Baddour Parkway/SR 26 east) to I-40 – Watertown	Southern end of US 70/SR 26 concurrency; SR 141 switches from north-south to east-west
Smith	New Middleton	42.6– 42.7	68.6– 68.7	I-40 – Nashville, Knoxville	I-40 exit 254
Smith	New Middleton	42.9	69.0	SR 53 south (Alexandria Highway) – Alexandria	Western end of SR 53 concurrency
Smith	Gordonsville	47.3	76.1	SR 53 north (Gordonsville Highway) / SR 264 south (Hatton Wauford Parkway) to I-40 – South Carthage, Carthage, Hickman, Smithville	Eastern end of SR 53 concurrency; western end of SR 264 concurrency
Smith	Gordonsville	48.5	78.1	SR 264 north (Stonewall Highway) – Elmwood	Eastern end of SR 264 concurrency
DeKalb		59.2	95.3	SR 96 west (Cove Hollow Road) – Smithville, Dowelltown	Western end of SR 96 concurrency
DeKalb		59.4– 59.6	95.6– 95.9	Center Hill Dam over the Caney Fork River	
DeKalb		60.3	97.0	SR 96 west (Cove Hollow Road) – Buffalo Valley; Edgar Evins State Park Road - Edgar Evins State Park	Eastern end of SR 96 concurrency; access road into state park
Putnam	Silver Point	67.0	107.8	SR 56 (Smithville Highway) to I-40 – Smithville, Baxter	Eastern terminus; SR 141 ends as an east-west highway
1.000 mi = 1.609 km; 1.000 km = 0.621 mi: Concurrency terminus
