= Tennessee State Route 264 =

State highway in Tennessee, United States

State Route 264
- SR 264 highlighted in red

Route information
- Maintained by TDOT
- Length: 16.3 mi (26.2 km)
- Existed: July 1, 1983–present

Major junctions
- North end: US 70N / SR 53 in Elmwood
- SR 53 / SR 141 in Gordonsville
- South end: SR 96 northeast of Dowelltown

Location
- Country: United States
- State: Tennessee
- Counties: DeKalb, Smith

Highway system
- Tennessee State Routes; Interstate; US; State
← SR 263	→ SR 265

State Route 264 (SR 264) is a relatively short north–south highway in Middle Tennessee. The road begins 4.1 miles (6.6 km) NE of Dowelltown and ends in Elmwood. The current length is 16.3 mi (26.2 km).

== Route description ==
SR 264 begins in DeKalb County at an intersection with SR 96 4.1 miles (6.6 km) northeast of Dowelltown. It immediately passes down a hill and through the small community of Temperance Hall. After leaving Temperance Hall, SR 264 travels roughly northward and enters Smith County. During its time in DeKalb County, SR 264 is known as Hickman Highway.

After entering Smith County, SR 264 becomes Temperance Hall Highway, passing through Hickman. North of Hickman, the highway is once again known as Hickman Highway into Gordonsville. Upon entering Gordonsville, the old alignment of Hickman Highway splits off and continues north into town, while SR 264 turns northwest along a two-lane bypass known as Hatton Waterford Parkway. This bypass intersects SR 53 and SR 141 at a four-way stop, at which point SR 264 begins a concurrency with SR 141. They travel east as Main Street through Gordonsville before SR 264 splits off and continues northeast.

At this point SR 264 is known as Stonewall Highway as it crosses the Caney Fork River and moves through the community of Stonewall. In Stonewall, SR 264 curves to the north and continues to its northern terminus at US 70N/SR 24/SR 53 in Elmwood.

== Major intersections ==
County	Location	mi	km	Destinations	Notes
DeKalb		0.0	0.0	SR 96 (Dale Ridge Road) – Dowelltown, Center Hill Dam	Southern terminus
Smith	Gordonsville	10.6	17.1	SR 53 north (Gordonsville Highway) to I-40 – South Carthage, Carthage SR 53 south / SR 141 west (E Main Street) – Alexandria, Lebanon	Southern end of SR 141 concurrency
Smith	Gordonsville	11.8	19.0	SR 141 east (E Main Street) – Lancaster	Northern end of SR 141 concurrency; accesses Center Hill Dam and Edgar Evins State Park several miles away
Smith	Gordonsville	13.2– 13.3	21.2– 21.4	Bridge over the Caney Fork River	
Smith	Elmwood	16.3	26.2	US 70N / SR 53 (Cookeville Highway/SR 24) – South Carthage, Carthage, Baxter	Northern terminus
1.000 mi = 1.609 km; 1.000 km = 0.621 mi: Concurrency terminus

== See also ==
- List of state routes in Tennessee
