= Tennessee State Route 53 =

Highway in Tennessee

State Route 53
- SR 53; primary in red, secondary in blue

Route information
- Maintained by Tennessee Department of Transportation
- Length: 113.5 mi (182.7 km)
- Existed: October 1, 1923–present
- Tourist routes: Cumberland Historic Byway

Major junctions
- South end: US 41 in Manchester
- I-24 in Manchester; US 70S in Woodbury; US 70 / SR 96 in Liberty; I-40 near Gordonsville; US 70N / SR 25 in South Carthage; SR 262 in Gainesboro; SR 56 / SR 85 / SR 135 in Gainesboro; SR 52 in Celina
- North end: KY 61 near Peytonsburg, KY

Location
- Country: United States
- State: Tennessee
- Counties: Coffee, Cannon, DeKalb, Smith, Jackson, Clay

Highway system
- Tennessee State Routes; Interstate; US; State
← SR 52	→ SR 54

State Route 53 (SR 53) is a north–south state highway that traverses six counties in Middle Tennessee. It is 113.5 miles (182.7 km) long.

== Route description ==
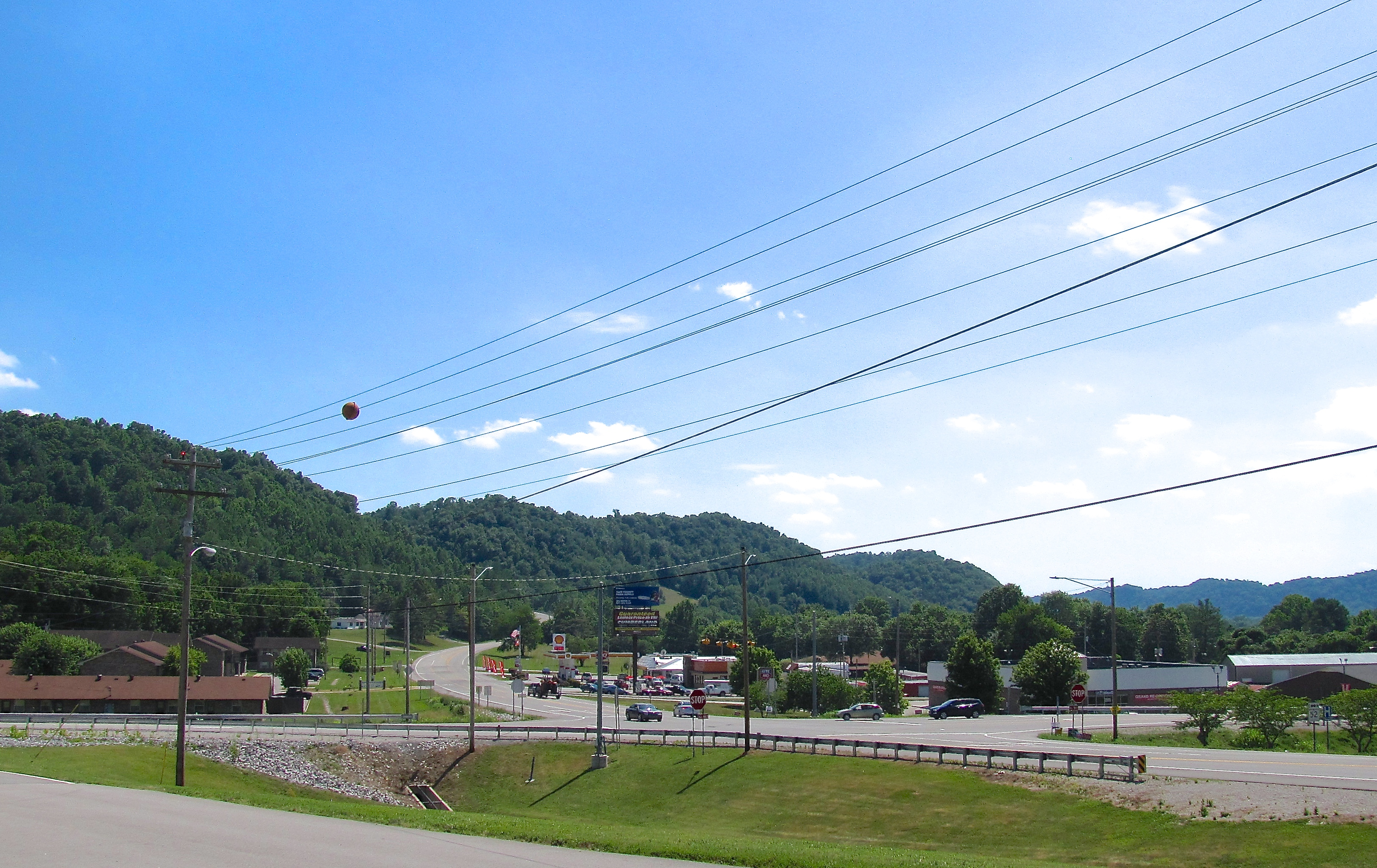
The intersection of State Route 52 and State Route 53 in Celina, looking southwest from the Cumberland River Hospital parking lot.

=== Coffee County ===
As a primary route, SR 53 begins at the junction with US 41/SR 2 in the Coffee County seat of Manchester. It goes northeast as a four-lane undivided highway (as Woodbury Highway) through a business district before it intersects I-24 (Exit 110) before leaving town, narrowing to two lanes, and continuing north into farmland. It has an intersection with SR 280 before crossing into Cannon County.

=== Cannon County ===
SR 53 continues through farmland (as Jim Cummings Highway) and has an intersection with SR 281 before curving through a gap between two ridges to enter Woodbury (as S McCrary Street). It goes through downtown to intersect and become concurrent with US 70S/SR 1 (Main Street) as the turn east and leave downtown before SR 53 splits off and turns north again (as Gassaway Road), leaving Woodbury and crossing the East Fork of the Stones River. SR 53 continues north through the mountains and treacherous terrain of the Highland Rim, as at this it becomes narrow and curvy, before crossing into DeKalb County, just after passing through the community of Gassaway.

=== DeKalb County ===
SR 53 continues through mountains (as Woodbury Highway) before leveling and straightening out just before entering Liberty and becoming concurrent with US 70/SR 26/SR 96 (Nashville Highway). They turn west as a four-lane undivided highway, with SR 96 splitting off to the southwest shortly afterwards. The highway then narrows to two lanes as they leave Liberty and pass through hilly countryside before entering Alexandria. SR 53 then separates from US 70/SR 26 and bypasses downtown to the east (as SR 53 bypass) before leaving Alexandria (as Alexandria Highway) and continuing north to cross into Smith County.

=== Smith County ===
SR 53 immediately enters and passes through Brush Creek before continuing north through farmland to enter New Middleton and become concurrent with SR 141, just south of its interchange with I-40 (Exit 254). They turn east (as New Middleton Highway) through New Middleton, and running parallel to I-40, before entering Gordonsville (as E Main Street). The highway is briefly signed as a secondary route from the first junction with SR 141 to the second one in Gordonsville. They then intersect with SR 264, where SR 141 continues along that route to downtown and SR 53 splits off and goes north again (as Gordonsville Highway) changes back to a primary route prior to intersecting I-40 (Exit 258) before leaving Gordonsville and continuing north through farmland to an interchange with US 70N/SR 24/SR 25 at South Carthage.

Here, SR 53 turns east to run concurrently with US 70N/SR 24 (as Cookeville Highway) while SR 25 goes north as a four-lane divided highway into Carthage. From here all the way to the Kentucky state line, the entire remainder of the SR 53 corridor parallels the Cumberland River. They pass through farmland, crossing a bridge over the Caney Fork River and having an intersection with SR 264 until the highway reaches Chestnut Mound. SR 53 then splits off from US 70N/SR 24 and once again becomes a secondary route as it becomes narrow and curvy due to entering mountains again as it crosses into Jackson County.

=== Jackson County ===
SR 53 continues north through hilly terrain (as Granville Highway) as a narrow and curvy road as it leaves Chestnut Mound and crosses a bridge over an arm of Cordell Hull Lake/Cumberland River to enter Granville. Here, it passes right through downtown and meets the eastern end of SR 96. It then leaves Granville and crosses another arm of Cordell Hull Lake/Cumberland River to east and continue through hilly terrain. The highway then turns north again at an intersection with SR 290 and becomes much curvier. It continues to an intersection with SR 262, where it becomes W Hull Avenue as it enters Gainesboro. SR 53 then passes through downtown before becoming concurrent with SR 56, where it returns to being a primary highway. They travel north (as Grundy Quarles Highway) to just south of SR 56's crossing of the Cumberland River, SR 53 splits off to the east and becomes concurrent with SR 85 and SR 135 (as N Grundy Quarles Highway). SR 135 splits off a short distance later just before crossing a bridge over the Roaring River, with SR 85 splitting off shortly afterwards. SR 53 then continues further north along the banks of the Cumberland River into Clay County.

=== Clay County ===
SR 53 continues along the banks of the Cumberland River (as Gainesboro Highway), surrounded by mountains on either side and farmland along the river banks. It then has an intersection with SR 292 before entering Celina. In Celina, it bypasses downtown to the east and intersects with SR 52.

After it passes through Celina, SR 53 goes in a northeasterly direction, over the Obey River, skirting the banks of Dale Hollow Lake until it reaches its northern terminus at the Kentucky state line. The road continues as Kentucky Route 61 (KY 61) upon entering Cumberland County, Kentucky.

== History ==
The highway in Clay County passed through the town of Willow Grove until the town's destruction in 1943 with the creation of the Dale Hollow Reservoir. Much of SR 53 between Celina and Byrdstown was flooded as a result of the impounding of the Obey River to build the Dale Hollow Dam. The highway's entry to the town is now the site of Cedar Hill Marina. Those events caused the Department of Highways to reroute Highway 53 northeastward to KY 61 at the Kentucky state line following the shore of the new lake. The remnants of the former SR 53 east of Dale Hollow Lake is now signed as SR 325.

The route in Smith County has been rebuilt multiple times, too. The concurrency with SR 24 previously went from the center of South Carthage to the eastern end of Chestnut Mound, as SR 53 followed what are now South Main Street in South Carthage and parts of Enigma Road in Enigma. Eventually, bypasses of South Carthage and Enigma were built following the current route of SR 53, and part of the initial route of Enigma Road was flooded by a shallow bay of Cordell Hull Reservoir. The current route from New Middleton to Alexandria via Brush Creek is also not the original route.

== Additional information of the route ==
SR 53 from Gainesboro to Celina, and the corridor from Celina to the Kentucky state line is considered to be parts of the Corridor J-1 and J projects, respectively, of the Appalachian Development Highway System. KY 61 north of the state line continues Corridor J into Kentucky.

== Major intersections ==
County	Location	mi	km	Destinations	Notes
Coffee	Manchester	0.0	0.0	US 41 (Murfreesboro Highway/SR 2) – Murfreesboro, Monteagle	Southern terminus; SR 53 begins as a primary highway
Coffee	Manchester	0.8	1.3	I-24 – Nashville, Chattanooga	I-24 exit 110
Coffee	Pocahontas	9.9	15.9	SR 280 west (Gnat Hill Road) – Beechgrove	Eastern terminus of SR 280
Cannon		19.4	31.2	SR 281 east (Iconium Road)	Western terminus of SR 281
Cannon	Woodbury	23.5	37.8	US 70S west (Main Street/SR 1 west) – Murfreesboro	Southern end of US 70S/SR 1 concurrency
Cannon	Woodbury	24.2	38.9	US 70S east (Main Street/SR 1 east) – McMinnville	Northern end of US 70S/SR 1 concurrency
Cannon		25.8	41.5	Bridge over the East Fork of the Stones River	
DeKalb	Liberty	38.7	62.3	US 70 east / SR 96 east (Nashville Highway/SR 26 east) – Dowelltown, Smithville	Southern end of US 70/SR 26/SR 96 concurrency
DeKalb		40.1	64.5	SR 96 west – Auburntown, Murfreesboro	Northern end of SR 96 concurrency
DeKalb	Alexandria	43.9	70.7	US 70 west (Nashville Highway/SR 26 west) – Watertown, Lebanon	Northern end of US 70/SR 26 concurrency
Smith	New Middleton	51.6	83.0	SR 141 west (Grant Highway) to I-40 – Lebanon	Southern end of SR 141 concurrency; SR 53 turns secondary
Smith	Gordonsville	56.1	90.3	SR 141 south / SR 264 (E Main Street/Hatton Wauford Parkway) – Dowelltown, Smithville, Downtown	Northern end of SR 141 concurrency; SR 53 turns primary
Smith	Gordonsville	56.5	90.9	I-40 – Nashville, Knoxville	I-40 exit 258
Smith	South Carthage	60.7	97.7	US 70N west (Lebanon Highway/SR 24 west) / SR 25 west – Lebanon, Downtown	Interchange; southern end of US 70N/SR 24 concurrency; eastern terminus of SR 25
Smith		62.5	100.6	Bridge over the Caney Fork River	
Smith	Elmwood	64.6	104.0	SR 264 south (Stonewall Road) – Gordonsville	Northern terminus of SR 264
Smith	Chestnut Mound	68.2	109.8	US 70N east (Cookeville Highway/SR 24 east) – Baxter, Cookeville	Northern end of US 70N/SR 24 concurrency; SR 53 turns secondary
Jackson		72.1	116.0	Bridge over an arm of Cordell Hull Lake	
Jackson	Granville	73.4	118.1	SR 96 west (Clover Street) – Baxter	Eastern terminus of SR 96
Jackson	Granville	73.5	118.3	DR. L.M. Freeman Memorial Bridge over an arm of Cordell Hull Lake	
Jackson		77.8	125.2	SR 290 east (Shepardsville Highway) – Cookeville	Western terminus of SR 290; provides access to Cummins Falls State Park
Jackson	Gainesboro	85.5	137.6	SR 262 west (Gladdice Highway) – Willette	Eastern terminus of SR 262
Jackson	Gainesboro	86.2	138.7	SR 56 south (Grundy Quarles Highway) to I-40 – Baxter	Southern end of SR 56 concurrency; SR 53 turns primary
Jackson	Gainesboro	87.4	140.7	SR 56 north / SR 85 west / SR 135 north (Grundy Quarles Highway) – Red Boiling Springs	Northern end of SR 56 concurrency; southern end of SR 85/SR 135 concurrency
Jackson	Gainesboro	87.6	141.0	SR 135 south (Dodson Branch Highway) – Cookeville	Northern end of SR 135 wrong-way concurrency
Jackson	Gainesboro	87.7	141.1	Bridge over the Roaring River	
Jackson	Gainesboro	88.2	141.9	SR 85 east (York Highway) – Hilham, Livingston	Northern end of SR 85 concurrency
Clay		99.0	159.3	SR 292 east (Baptist Ridge Road) – Hilham	Western terminus of SR 292
Clay	Celina	104.9	168.8	SR 52 (Brown Street) – Red Boiling Springs, Livingston	
Clay	Celina	106.0	170.6	Bridge over the Obey River	
Clay		113.5	182.7	KY 61 north (Celina Road) – Burkesville	Kentucky state line; northern terminus; SR 53 ends as a primary highway
1.000 mi = 1.609 km; 1.000 km = 0.621 mi: Concurrency terminus
