= Tennessee State Route 24 =

State highway in Tennessee, United States

State Route 24

Route information
- Maintained by TDOT
- Length: 131.11 mi (211.00 km)
- Existed: October 1, 1923–present

Major junctions
- West end: US 70 / US 70S – Nashville
- East end: US 127 – Crossville

Location
- Country: United States
- State: Tennessee
- Counties: Davidson, Wilson, Smith, Putnam, Cumberland

Highway system
- Tennessee State Routes; Interstate; US; State
← I-24	→ US 25

State Route 24 (SR 24) is an unsigned west–east state highway in Tennessee, as it coincides with U.S. Route 70 (and U.S. Route 70 Business in Lebanon) and U.S. Route 70N for its entire duration from Nashville to Crossville. The road begins in western Nashville (junction of Memphis–Bristol Highway and Charlotte Pike) and ends in Crossville (junction of West Avenue and Sparta Highway). It runs alongside Interstate 40 for its entire length.

There are no "Tennessee 24" signs along the route, although the designation can be seen on the route's mile markers.

== Route description ==
=== Davidson County ===
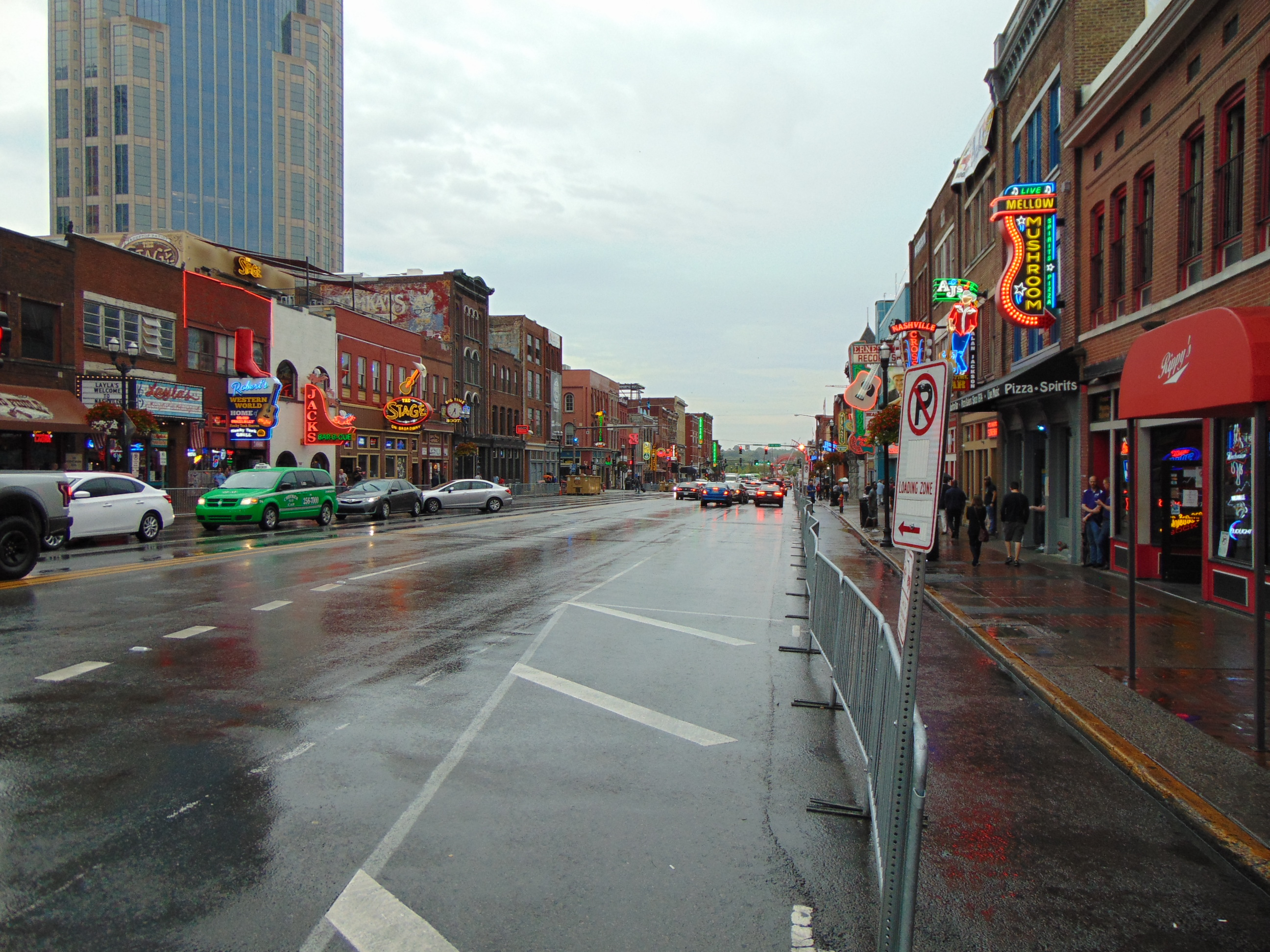
East on Lower Broadway (US 70 / SR 24) in Nashville, August 2017

SR 24 begins in Davidson County at an intersection with US 70/US 70S/SR 1 on the west side of Nashville. It goes east as the unsigned companion route of US 70 through a wooded area to an intersection with SR 251 (Old Hickory Boulevard). They continue east by some businesses before having an interchange with I-40 (Exit 201). They continue east along Charlotte Avenue by some more businesses before having a turn with SR 155 (White Bridge Pike). They continue east to pass under the I-40/I-440 before having an interchange with I-40/I-65 (Exit 209). It then enters downtown and becomes the frontage roads for the Interstates before becoming concurrent with US 70S/US 431/SR 1 (Broadway) and going through downtown. They then come to an intersection with US 31/US 41/SR 11 (Rosa L. Parks Boulevard), where US 70S/US 431/SR 1 turn south to follow that route. It continues east along Broadway before turning southeast and running along the banks of the Cumberland River on 1st Avenue South, then on Hermitage Avenue. It then passes directly underneath the interchange between I-24/I-40. It then passes through an industrialized area before having an interchange with SR 155 (Briley Parkway), a freeway-grade beltway around the north side of downtown (Exit 8), before going through Donelson (along Lebanon Pike) and passing just north of Nashville International Airport, having an intersection with SR 255 (Donelson Pike). It then crosses over the Stones River and enters Hermitage. It then passes straight through downtown, having an intersection with SR 45 and SR 265, before passing The Hermitage, famous home of Andrew Jackson, the seventh president of the United States.

=== Wilson County ===
US 70/SR 24 then cross into Wilson County, leaving Hermitage and the Nashville area. It then passes through Green Hill and Mount Juliet, having an intersection with SR 171, before going through some countryside and having an interchange with SR 109 in Martha. It then goes through some more countryside before entering Lebanon. It passes by a few businesses before US 70 and SR 24 split at an intersection with SR 26 and US 70 Bus, with US 70 bypassing downtown to the north along SR 26, and SR 24 following US 70 Bus through downtown. It then passes by some more businesses before going through some neighborhoods and entering downtown and having an intersection with US 231/SR 10 at an historic traffic circle and business district. It then becomes concurrent with SR 266 shortly afterward, before going through some more neighborhoods and coming to an intersection with US 70/US 70N/SR 26/SR 141, with US 70 Bus and SR 266 ending and SR 24 continues east along US 70N. It then passes a few more businesses before leaving Lebanon and continuing through countryside.

=== Smith County ===
It then crosses into Smith County and starts paralleling the Cumberland River to pass through Rome and enter South Carthage. It then passes through downtown before coming to an interchange with SR 25 and SR 53, just across the river from downtown Carthage, the county seat. They then go east, concurrent with SR 53, through the countryside as it leaves South Carthage and crosses the Caney Fork River before going through Elmwood and having an intersection with SR 264. It then leaves the Cumberland River, now Cordell Hull Lake, as it begins entering the mountains, narrows, and becomes curvy as it begins to cross over the Highland Rim. It then passes through Chestnut Mound, where SR 53 separates and turns north. It then rises in elevation as it enters the Cumberland Plateau and crosses into Putnam County.

=== Putnam County ===
It then has an intersection and becomes concurrent with SR 96 immediately afterward, and goes east through some more mountains before SR 96 separates and goes north. The road then straightens out and widens as it enters Baxter and just north of town before coming to an intersection with SR 56. It then has an intersection with SR 291 in the Double Springs community before entering Cookeville. It goes through some neighborhoods and passes by some businesses before entering downtown at an intersection with SR 135, which provides access to Tennessee Technological University (TTU). It then continues through downtown to have an intersection with SR 136 before leaving downtown and continuing through some more neighborhoods to an interchange with SR 111 before having an interchange with I-40 (Exit 290). It then leaves Cookeville and continues east through countryside. It then begins paralleling I-40 and goes through a large wooded area before coming to an intersection with SR 84 and becoming concurrent with it before having another interchange with I-40 (Exit 300), just before entering Monterey. Just before entering downtown, SR 84 separates and enters downtown, having an intersection with SR 62 a couple of blocks away. US 70N/SR 24 turns east and goes through a small neighborhood before having another interchange with I-40 (Exit 301) before leaving Monterey and going through more countryside, paralleling and crossing under the interstate twice before entering Cumberland County.

=== Cumberland County ===
It continues through countryside and then farmland before entering Crossville at an intersection with the new SR 462 (Northwest Connector). They then pass by several businesses before coming to an intersection with US 70/SR 1 before turning east and going for two blocks before both US 70N/SR 24 both end at an intersection with US 127/SR 28 just north of downtown.

== History ==
SR 24 was signed as a standalone route until US 70 was commissioned in Tennessee in 1926. At that time, SR 24 became the secret companion route for US 70 Alternate (US 70A), which was re-signed as US 70N in 1939.

Prior to the 1930s, the routing of SR 24 included most of its present-day alignment from Nashville to Cookeville, but followed a route from Cookeville to a junction with the northern terminus of SR 28 (the present-day hidden designation of US 127) in Static at the Kentucky state line. SR 24 beyond Cookeville was reassigned to its current route to Crossville, and the roadway from Cookeville to Static was re-designated as SR 42, which became a part of the extended SR 111 in 1992.

== Major intersections ==
County	Location	mi	km	Destinations	Notes
Davidson	Nashville	0.00	0.00	US 70 west (Charlotte Pike/SR 1) / US 70S east (Highway 70 S/SR 1) to I-40 – Pegram, Bellevue	Western terminus of SR 24 and US 70S; Concurrency with US 70 begins
Davidson	Nashville			SR 251 (Old Hickory Boulevard) to I-40 – Ashland City, Bellevue	
Davidson	Nashville			I-40 – Memphis, Nashville	I-40 exit 201
Davidson	Nashville			SR 155 (Briley Parkway/White Bridge Pike)	Beltway around Nashville
Davidson	Nashville			I-40 / I-65 – Memphis, Knoxville, Louisville, KY, Huntsville, AL	I-40/I-65 exit 209; US 70/SR 24 continues southeast along the frontage roads
Davidson	Nashville			I-40 / I-65 – Memphis, Knoxville, Louisville, KY, Huntsville, AL US 70S / US 431 west (Broadway/SR 1)	I-40/I-65 exit 209A; Concurrency with US 431/US 70S/SR 1 begins
Davidson	Nashville			US 70S east / US 431 north / US 31 / US 41 (8th Avenue/SR 1/SR 6/SR 11)	Concurrency with US 431/US 70S/SR 1 ends
Davidson	Nashville			SR 155 (Briley Parkway)	SR 155 exit 8
Davidson	Donelson			SR 255 south (Donelson Pike) to I-40	Northern terminus of SR 255; Provides access to Nashville International Airport
Davidson	Hermitage			SR 265 east (Central Pike)	Western terminus of SR 265
Davidson	Hermitage			SR 45 (Old Hickory Boulevard) to I-40 – Old Hickory, Madison	
Wilson	Mount Juliet			SR 171 south (North Mount Juliet Road) – Antioch	Northern terminus of SR 171
Wilson	Martha			SR 109 to I-40 – Gallatin	Interchange
Wilson	Lebanon			US 70 east (Badour Parkway/SR 26) / US 70 Bus. east	Beginning of US 70 BUS; Concurrency with US 70 ends; Concurrency with US 70 BUS begins
Wilson	Lebanon			US 231 (Cumberland Street/SR 10)	
Wilson	Lebanon			SR 266 (College Street)	
Wilson	Lebanon			US 70 / SR 141 (High Street/SR 26) / US 70N east	Beginning of US 70N; end of US 70 Bus; concurrency with US 70N begins
Smith	South Carthage			SR 25 west / SR 53 south – Carthage, Gordonsville	Interchange; concurrency with SR 53 begins; eastern terminus of SR 25
Smith	Elmwood			SR 264 south (Stonewall Highway) – Gordonsville	Northern terminus of SR 264
Smith	Chestnut Mound			SR 53 north (Granville Highway) – Granville	Concurrency with SR 53 ends
Putnam	Buffalo Valley			SR 96 west (Medley Ammonett Road) – Dowelltown, Center Hill Dam	Concurrency with SR 96 begins
Putnam	Gentry			SR 96 east (Shaw Branch Road) – Granville	Concurrency with SR 96 ends
Putnam	Baxter			SR 56 (Gainesboro Highway) – Gainesboro, Baxter	
Putnam	Double Springs			SR 291 north (Bloomington Road) – Bloomington Springs	Southern terminus of SR 291
Putnam	Cookeville			SR 135 (S Willow Avenue)	
Putnam	Cookeville			SR 136 (Jefferson Avenue/Washington Avenue)	
Putnam	Cookeville			SR 111 – Sparta, Algood	Interchange
Putnam	Cookeville			I-40 – Nashville, Knoxville	I-40 exit 290
Putnam				SR 84 south (Calfkiller Highway) – Sparta	Concurrency with SR 84 begins
Putnam	Monterey			I-40 – Nashville, Knoxville	I-40 exit 300
Putnam	Monterey			SR 84 north (S Holly Street) – Livingston	Concurrency with SR 84 ends
Putnam	Monterey			SR 164 north (S Chestnut Street) – Hanging Limb, Jamestown	Southern terminus of SR 164
Putnam	Monterey			I-40 – Nashville, Knoxville	I-40 exit 301
Cumberland	Crossville			SR 462 west (Northwest Connector)	Current eastern terminus of SR 462
Cumberland	Crossville			US 70 (Elmore Road/West Avenue/SR 1)	
Cumberland	Crossville			US 127 (N Main Street/SR 28)	End of US 70N; eastern terminus of SR 24
1.000 mi = 1.609 km; 1.000 km = 0.621 mi: Concurrency terminus

== Landmarks ==
The following landmarks are visible from Tennessee 24:

- Centennial Park in Nashville
- Bridgestone Arena in Nashville
- Ryman Auditorium in Nashville
- Country Music Hall of Fame in Nashville
- AT&T Building (formerly BellSouth Tower) in Nashville
- Nissan Stadium in Nashville
- The Cumberland River (several instances)
- The Hermitage in Hermitage
- The former Castle Heights Military Academy in Lebanon

== See also ==
- List of Tennessee state highways
