= U.S. Route 70N =

Numbered Highway in Tennessee, United States

U.S. Route 70N
- US 70N highlighted in red

Route information
- Auxiliary route of US 70
- Maintained by TDOT
- Length: 86.0 mi (138.4 km)
- Existed: 1939–present

Major junctions
- West end: US 70 / US 70 Bus. / SR 141 in Lebanon
- SR 111 in Cookeville; I-40 (three times); US 70 in Crossville
- East end: US 127 in Crossville

Location
- Country: United States
- State: Tennessee
- Counties: Wilson, Smith, Putnam, Cumberland

Highway system
- United States Numbered Highway System; List; Special; Divided; Tennessee State Routes; Interstate; US; State
← US 70	→ US 70S

U.S. Route 70N (US 70N) is a northern alternate to U.S. Route 70, passing through parts of Middle Tennessee and East Tennessee. It runs 86.0 miles (138.4 km) east–west from Lebanon to Crossville, connecting the cities of Carthage, Baxter, Cookeville, and Monterey.

== Route description ==
US 70N is a predominantly two-lane rural highway, with divided-four lanes at major intersections only.

The entire route is in concurrency with SR 24; which is recognized as a primary route between Lebanon and Cookeville, and secondary between Cookeville and Crossville. It also follows closely to Interstate 40, which is a faster and preferable route for travelers.

=== Wilson County ===
US 70N begins in Lebanon just east of downtown at an intersection with US 70/SR 26/SR 141 (High Street/Baddour Parkway) and US 70 Business/SR 24 (E Main Street). It heads northeast through neighborhoods to leave Lebanon (concurrent with SR 24) and pass through farmland for several miles to cross into Smith County.

=== Smith County ===
It then crosses into Smith County and starts paralleling the Cumberland River to pass through Rome and enter South Carthage. It then passes through downtown before coming to an interchange with SR 25 and SR 53, just across the river from downtown Carthage, the county seat. They then go east, concurrent with SR 53, through countryside as it leaves South Carthage and crosses the Caney Fork River before going through Elmwood and having an intersection with SR 264. It then leaves the Cumberland River, now Cordell Hull Lake, as it begins entering mountains and narrows and becomes curvy as it begins to cross over the Highland Rim. It then passes through Chestnut Mound, where SR 53 separates and turns north. It then rises in elevation, as it enters the Cumberland Plateau, and crosses into Putnam County.

=== Putnam County ===
It then has an intersection and becomes concurrent with SR 96 immediately afterwards, and goes east through some more mountains before SR 96 separates and goes north. The road then straightens out and widens as it enters Baxter and just north of town before coming to an intersection with SR 56. It then has an intersection with SR 291 in the Double Springs community before entering Cookeville. It goes through some neighborhoods and passes by some businesses before entering downtown at an intersection with SR 135, which provides access to Tennessee Technological University (TTU). It then continues through downtown to have an intersection with SR 136 before leaving downtown and continuing through some more neighborhoods to an interchange with SR 111 before having an interchange with I-40 (Exit 290). It then leaves Cookeville and continues east through countryside. It then begins paralleling I-40 and goes through a large wooded area before coming to an intersection with SR 84 and becoming concurrent with it before having another interchange with I-40 (Exit 300), just before entering Monterey. Just before entering downtown, SR 84 separates and enters downtown, having an intersection with SR 62 a couple of blocks away. US 70N/SR 24 turns east and goes through a small neighborhoods before having another interchange with I-40 (Exit 301) before leaving Monterey and going through more countryside, paralleling and crossing the interstate twice before entering Cumberland County.

=== Cumberland County ===
It continues through countryside and then farmland to pass through Cumberland Cove before entering Crossville at an intersection with the new SR 462 (Northwest Connector). They then pass by several businesses, where it crosses the Obed River, before coming to an intersection with US 70/SR 1 before turning east and going for 2 blocks before both US 70N/SR 24 both end at an intersection with US 127/SR 28 just north of downtown.

== Junction list ==
County	Location	mi	km	Destinations	Notes
Wilson	Lebanon	0.0	0.0	US 70 / SR 141 (High Street/SR 26) / US 70 Bus. (East Main Street/SR 24 west)	Western end of unsigned SR 24 concurrency; western terminus of US 70N
Smith	South Carthage	20.1– 20.3	32.3– 32.7	SR 25 west / SR 53 south – Carthage, Gordonsville	Interchange; western end of SR 53 concurrency; Eastern terminus of SR 25
Smith		22.1– 22.3	35.6– 35.9	Benton McMillian Memorial Bridge over the Caney Fork River	
Smith	Elmwood	24.2	38.9	SR 264 south (Stonewall Highway) – Gordonsville	Northern terminus of SR 264
Smith	Chestnut Mound	27.8	44.7	SR 53 north (Granville Highway) – Granville	Eastern end of SR 53 concurrency
Putnam		31.3	50.4	SR 96 west (Medley Amonette Road) – Center Hill Dam, Dowelltown	Western end of SR 96 concurrency
Putnam		36.0	57.9	SR 96 east (Shaw Branch Road) – Granville	Eastern end of SR 96 concurrency
Putnam	Baxter	41.5	66.8	SR 56 (Gainesboro Highway) – Gainesboro, Baxter	
Putnam	Double Springs	43.2	69.5	SR 291 north (Bloomington Road)	Southern terminus of SR 291
Putnam	Cookeville	48.3	77.7	SR 135 (Willow Avenue)	
Putnam	Cookeville	49.0	78.9	SR 136 south (South Jefferson Avenue)	Western end of SR 136 concurrency
Putnam	Cookeville	49.1	79.0	SR 136 north (North Washington Avenue)	Eastern end of SR 136 concurrency
Putnam	Cookeville	50.6– 50.7	81.4– 81.6	SR 111 – Sparta, Algood	Interchange
Putnam	Cookeville	52.5– 52.6	84.5– 84.7	I-40 – Nashville, Knoxville	I-40 exit 290
Putnam		64.2	103.3	SR 84 south (Calfkiller Highway) – Sparta	Western end of SR 84 concurrency
Putnam	Monterey	65.0– 65.3	104.6– 105.1	I-40 – Cookeville, Knoxville	I-40 exit 300
Putnam	Monterey	65.7	105.7	SR 84 north (S Holly Street) – Livingston	Eastern end of SR 84 concurrency
Putnam	Monterey	65.8	105.9	SR 164 north (S Chestnut Street) – Hanging Limb, Jamestown	Southern terminus of SR 164
Putnam	Monterey	66.2– 66.3	106.5– 106.7	I-40 – Nashville, Knoxville	I-40 exit 301
Putnam		68.4– 68.5	110.1– 110.2	Bridge over I-40	
Cumberland	Crossville	84.2	135.5	SR 462 west (Northwest Connector)	Current eastern terminus of SR 462
Cumberland	Crossville	84.6	136.2	Bridge over the Obed River	
Cumberland	Crossville	85.7	137.9	US 70 (Elmore Road/West Avenue/SR 1)	
Cumberland	Crossville	86.0	138.4	US 127 (N Main Street/SR 28)	Eastern terminus of US 70N and unsigned SR 24
1.000 mi = 1.609 km; 1.000 km = 0.621 mi: Concurrency terminus

== See also ==
- U.S. Route 70S
