= Smith Fork Creek =

Location
- Country: United States
- State: Tennessee
- County: Wilson, DeKalb, Smith

Physical characteristics
- Source: Confluence of Knight Creek and Sunset Creek
  - location: SW of Statesville in Wilson County
  - coordinates: 36.0101°N 86.1362°W
- Mouth: Caney Fork River
  - location: Seabowisha in Smith County
  - coordinates: 36.1389°N 85.8696°W
- Length: 39 mi (63 km)
- Depth
  - maximum: 27.50 ft (8.38 m); November 7, 2017
- Discharge
  - location: Highway 264 bridge (USGS gauge 1991-present)
  - average: 873 cu ft/s (24.7 m^{3}/s) (average daily discharge; 1991-2020)
  - minimum: 3.3 cu ft/s (0.093 m^{3}/s); August/September 2007
  - maximum: 38,700 cu ft/s (1,100 m^{3}/s); November 7, 2017

Basin features
- River system: Cumberland River

The Smith Fork Creek is a large stream that flows through Middle Tennessee in the United States, draining much of the southwestern Upper Cumberland region. It is a major tributary of the Caney Fork River, and is part of the Cumberland, Ohio and Mississippi basins. The creek is approximately 39 to 40 miles (63 to 64 km) long, and its watershed covers parts of four counties as a subset of the Caney Fork watershed. The small towns and communities of Statesville, Auburntown, Gassaway, Liberty, Dowelltown, Temperance Hall, and Lancaster are drained by the creek, which empties into the Caney Fork 4.1 miles (6.6 km) southeast of Gordonsville.

== Geography ==
The Smith Fork rises in Wilson County about 1 mile (1.6 km) southwest of Statesville at the confluence of the smaller Knight Creek and Sunset Creek along Greenvale Road. The stream flows directly through the town of Statesville, following Highway 267 toward DeKalb County. Before crossing into DeKalb County, Smith Fork picks up Saunders Fork, a major tributary, which drains much of northwestern Cannon County, including Auburntown. The creek then slowly meanders northeast through western DeKalb County, picking up the Clear Fork Creek in Liberty and Dry Creek in Dowelltown. Both the Clear Fork and Dry Creek begin along the northern slope of Short Mountain, the westernmost point in Tennessee over 2,000 feet (610 meters) in elevation. After passing through Temperance Hall, the creek enters Smith County and passes on the west side of Lancaster. The Smith Fork then empties into the Caney Fork River under a railroad bridge along the Nashville and Eastern Railroad, a place known as Seabowisha.

An urban legend exists that Smith Fork Creek is the longest creek in the world at 99 miles (159 km) and that a stream must be at least 100 miles (160 km) long to be called a river. However, the creek is not nearly 99 miles (159 km) long; it is less than half that long. Furthermore, many streams shorter than 100 miles (160 km) are called rivers.

== See also ==
- Center Hill Lake
- List of rivers of Tennessee
