= Temperance Hall, Tennessee =

- Unincorporated community
- Location within Tennessee
- Coordinates: 36°4′59″N 85°54′05″W
- Country: United States
- State: Tennessee
- County: DeKalb
- Founded: 1798
- Founded by: Stephen Robinson Sr.
- Elevation: 594 ft (181 m)
- Time zone: UTC-6 (Central (CST))
  - Summer (DST): UTC-5 (CDT)
- ZIP code: 37095 (Liberty, TN)
- ZIP code: 38569 (Lancaster, TN)
- Area code: 615/629
- GNIS feature ID: 1313794

Temperance Hall is an unincorporated community in northern DeKalb County, Tennessee, United States. It is located approximately 4 miles (6.4 km) west-southwest of Center Hill Dam. It was established in 1798 by Stephen Robinson Sr., one of the first four settlers of DeKalb County.

== Geography ==
Temperance Hall is located at 36°4′59″N 85°54′05″W (36.084, -85.901). The community is situated along State Highway 264 and Smith Fork Creek between Alexandria and Center Hill Lake and has a total area of roughly 0.9 square miles (2.3 km^{2}). The area is predominantly situated in the extreme northern part of ZIP code 37095 (Liberty), although it partially lies within 38569 (Lancaster). The edges of ZIP codes 37012 (Alexandria) and 38567 (Hickman) cover areas less than a mile from the center of the community, on the opposite side of Smith Fork Creek.

== History ==
The area was first visited by a hunting party of an unknown number in 1780. The group killed 105 bears, 74 buffalo, and more than 80 deer, enough to feed all of Fort Nashborough for the winter.

Stephen Robinson Sr., who originated in Cumberland County, Virginia, came to the area now known as DeKalb County in 1798 along with Adam Dale and brothers Leonard and John Fite. Although the land was populated by hostile Native Americans, each of the four settlers successfully established communities in the area. Temperance Hall was originally part of Smith County until a border realignment on February 1, 1850, reclassified the town as a DeKalb County community. In Temperance Hall, several mills were established along the Smith Fork of the Caney Fork River (commonly known as Smith Fork Creek). The largest mill, built by settler Samuel Caplinger, was located about half a mile northwest of town at the confluence of the Smith Fork and a smaller branch. It remained in operation until being mostly destroyed by a flood in 1946. Some of the mill's remains are still intact, located approximately 500 feet (150 m) to the southwest of the State Highway 264 bridge across the Smith Fork. Caplinger built a house on a nearby hill overlooking the town in 1821. The house was notable for being unlike any other known house in Tennessee and was listed on the National Register of Historic Places on February 12, 1980, but was removed on April 20, 1989, and torn down shortly afterward.

Many homes were built in the area around the mill as settlers were attracted to the fertile farm land along the Smith Fork. Numerous stores, a hotel, a bank, an undertaking business, and several churches soon followed (the first of the churches–Mt. Zion Baptist Church–opened in 1850 a couple miles south of town and was then followed by churches of other denominations, which were located directly in town). Many physicians started practices in the area as well. A post office was established in 1850, but was closed in 1904. The bank, which was known as "The Temperance Hall Bank & Trust Company", operated for many years before closing during the Great Depression. Perhaps the most notable citizen of Temperance Hall during the 1800s was Colonel William Brickly Stokes, a politician and Union general during the American Civil War. Although he grew up in Temperance Hall, Stokes would retire to nearby Alexandria.

By the 1890s, Temperance Hall was a thriving community of about 150 citizens. There were three dry good stores, one drug store, two blacksmith shops, and two mills. They had three doctors, many carpenters, and men of many other professions. However, most of the residents were farmers by profession and produced much corn, wheat, sorghum, and livestock, which was transported to the larger cities for sale. The town had one of the first telephone offices in DeKalb County, and it operated for many years until closing in the early 1950s. A stockyard was also operated in the town, and, when purchased, livestock would be taken to nearby Hickman to be transported by train. On February 15, 1895, one of the mills burned to the ground. If it had not been for a large snow that lay on the ground, many of the town's houses would have burned. The mill contained 300 bushels of corn, 400 bushels of wheat, 2-1/2 barrels of sorghum, and much meal, flour, and lumber, all of which was lost.

Temperance Hall was also known for being home to many race horses, some of which were nationally known. One quarter horse named "Ariel", owned by Colonel Stokes, won so many races that he was banned from most tracks; however, Stokes painted Ariel a different color and won more races until the paint began to remove the horse's hair.

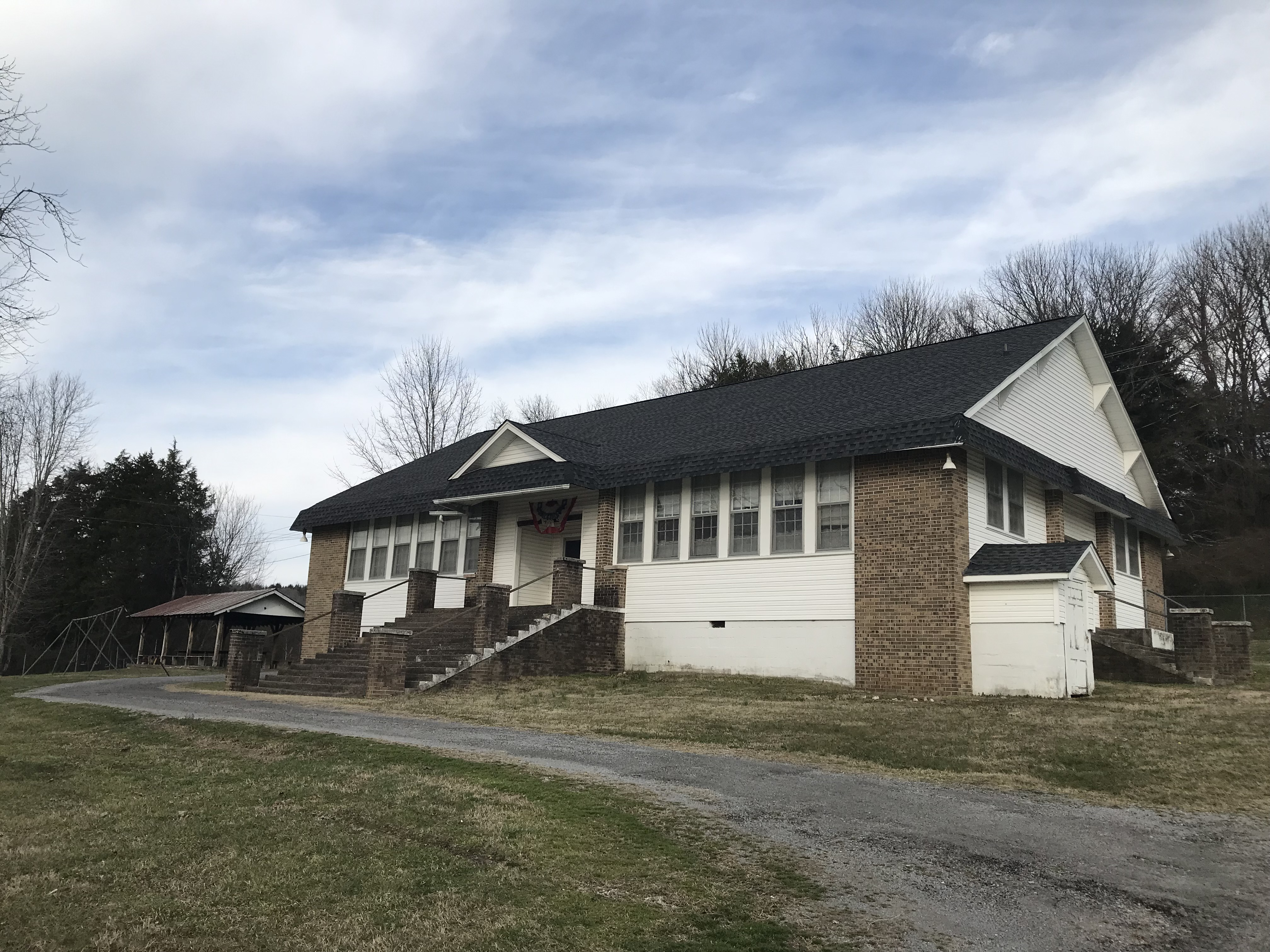
Temperance Hall Community Center, which formerly served as the last public school in the community in the 1960s.

The first school in the area was a one-room log house that was located near the Methodist Church. Later, a two-story frame building with large columns and covered entrances was built and named Earl Academy, in honor of the school's first teacher. School began at Earl Academy on January 23, 1895, and by early February, over 100 students were enrolled. The school was considered the best in the county by many people. In 1920, a new two-story building was constructed just outside the main part of town. The building served as the new school until it burned down in June 1949. A new one-story building was built in its place during the early 1950s and served as the school until Temperance Hall's school was closed in the 1960s for lack of students. The building was renovated and reopened on October 31, 1971, as a community center. The building still serves as a community center in the present day.

Many people in the Temperance Hall area would go pearl hunting in the Caney Fork River. Many pearls found in mussels in the river were sold for hundreds, and sometimes even thousands, of dollars.

Although never being officially incorporated into a town, Temperance Hall was one of the most prosperous areas in DeKalb County for many decades. However, during the Great Depression, many residents began to move north to look for work. As a result, many of the industries in Temperance Hall and nearby Alexandria began to decline. Almost all of the businesses, schools, banks, churches, and the Temperance Hall Hotel closed as well (the hotel was later turned into a house and still stands). By the 1990s, the last store in Temperance Hall had closed, leaving only three small churches and the community center remaining. From the 1980s to the 2010s, the community center hosted a weekly country music dance and had several local bands perform there. The center also serves as the polling place for Temperance Hall and the nearby Long Branch and Cove Hollow communities and can be rented privately for special events.

=== Name ===
Temperance Hall received its name from a local branch of the Sons of Temperance in the 1800s. The group would meet on the top floor (second floor) of the town's hotel (which still stands today). The second floor of the hotel had a long hallway in which townspeople would gather to hear lectures and speeches on the issue of temperance. The hallway became known as "Temperance Hall", and thus the town was named such.

=== Popular culture ===
The town has been the filming site of at least two country music videos. John Anderson filmed a video there in 1986, and Alabama filmed their number one hit "Song of the South" there in late 1988. The filming of "Song of the South" drew a rather large crowd, which is depicted in the video.

== Education ==
Temperance Hall is served by the DeKalb County School District, with students in the area attending DeKalb West School (PreK–8) in Liberty and DeKalb County High School (9–12) in Smithville.

== Notable people ==
- William Brickly Stokes, Union Army colonel and politician
- John Rose, politician

== See also ==
- Lancaster, Tennessee – a community of similar size located to the northeast in Smith County
