= Tennessee State Route 260 =

State highway in Tennessee, United States

State Route 260
- Browning Branch Road
- SR 260 highlighted in red

Route information
- Maintained by TDOT
- Length: 5.6 mi (9.0 km)
- Existed: July 1, 1983–present

Major junctions
- West end: US 231 in rural northwest Troudsale County
- East end: SR 141 north of Hartsville

Location
- Country: United States
- State: Tennessee
- Counties: Trousdale

Highway system
- Tennessee State Routes; Interstate; US; State
← SR 259	→ SR 261

State Route 260 (SR 260), also known as Browning Branch Road, is an east–west secondary highway that is located entirely in Trousdale County in Middle Tennessee, United States. Its western terminus is located at a junction with US 231 near the Sumner County line, and it ends at SR 141 just north of Hartsville.

Even though SR 260 is designated as a secondary highway, there are various signs along the highway stating it is a primary highway.

== Route description ==
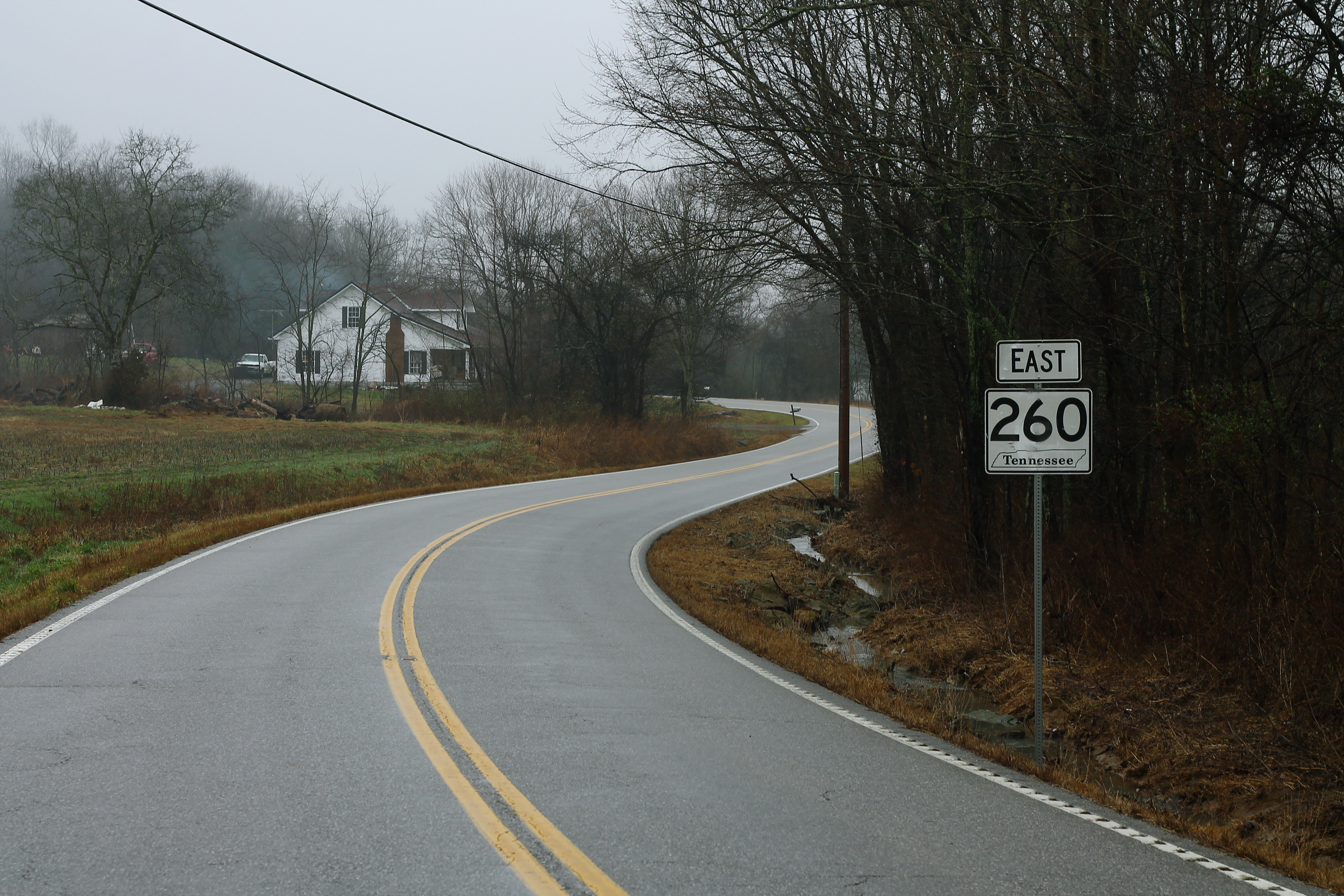
A stretch of SR 260, incorrectly signed as a primary route, February 2019

SR 260 traverses a rural area as a two-lane highway in Trousdale County. It serves as a connector between US 231/SR 376 and SR 141 just north of Hartsville. It goes through farmland as it traces along the edge of the Highland Rim.

== Major intersections ==
The entire route is in Trousdale County.

Location	mi	km	Destinations	Notes
	0.0	0.0	US 231 (SR 376) – Lebanon, Westmoreland	Western terminus
	5.6	9.0	SR 141 (Highway 141) – Hartsville, Westmoreland	Eastern terminus
1.000 mi = 1.609 km; 1.000 km = 0.621 mi

== See also ==
- List of state routes in Tennessee
- List of highways numbered 260
