= New Middleton, Tennessee =

- Unincorporated community
- Location within Tennessee Location within the United States
- Coordinates: 36°10′29″N 86°0′23″W
- Country: United States
- State: Tennessee
- County: Smith
- Elevation: 564 ft (172 m)
- Time zone: UTC-6 (Central (CST))
  - Summer (DST): UTC-5 (CDT)
- ZIP code: 38563
- Area code: 615
- GNIS feature ID: 1295606

New Middleton is an unincorporated community in Smith County, Tennessee, United States, located approximately 4 miles (6.4 km) west of Gordonsville.

The community does not have a post office and is instead part of Gordonsville's zip code 38563. The community is situated along State Highway 141 and Interstate 40 in western Smith County, and is drained by Mulherrin Creek, a tributary of the Caney Fork. New Middleton Elementary School is located in the community, serving grades PreK-2.

== See also ==
- Brush Creek, Tennessee – a nearby community of similar size
