= Tennessee State Route 462 =

State highway in Tennessee

State Route 462
- Northwest Connector
- TN 462 highlighted in red

Route information
- Maintained by TDOT
- Length: 4.6 mi (7.4 km)

Major junctions
- West end: US 70 in Crossville
- East end: SR 298 in Crossville

Location
- Country: United States
- State: Tennessee
- Counties: Cumberland

Highway system
- Tennessee State Routes; Interstate; US; State
← SR 461	→ SR 474

State Route 462 (SR 462) or the Northwest Connector is a secondary state highway in Cumberland County, Tennessee. When completed it will serve as a west and north bypass of Crossville. The route is currently under construction. One section will use two surface roads on the north side of Crossville.

As of July 2014 the southern portion From US 70 to US 70N is open. The entire route was signed as of August 2023.

== Junction list ==
The entire route is in Crossville, Cumberland County.

mi	km	Destinations	Notes
0.0	0.0	US 70 (Sparta Highway/SR 1) – Sparta, Crossville	Western terminus
2.1	3.4	US 70N (West Avenue/SR 24) – Monterey, Crossville	
3.1	5.0	US 127 (North Main Street/SR 28) – Jamestown, Downtown, Pikeville	
4.6	7.4	SR 298 (Genesis Road) to I-40 – Downtown, Wartburg	eastern terminus
1.000 mi = 1.609 km; 1.000 km = 0.621 mi: Proposed
