= Virginia Prewett =

Virginia Prewett (1919 – April 7, 1988) was a U.S. journalist whose writing focused on Latin American affairs.

== Biography ==
Virginia Prewett was born in Gordonsville, Tennessee, in 1919. She spent her teenage years living in Spain, then studied at Cumberland University, the University of Toulouse, and New York University.

In the 1940s, after beginning her career as a reporter at the Nashville Tennessean and Lebanon Banner, she became a foreign correspondent in Argentina, Brazil, and Mexico for the Chicago Sun and Sun-Times, with her writing widely syndicated through the publication's news service. She also worked briefly on Latin American issues for the International Rescue Committee in the late '40s.

Prewett went on to cover Latin America on a freelance basis for a variety of publications, including the Washington Post, Wall Street Journal, Atlantic, New Republic, Herald Tribune, Reader's Digest, Saturday Evening Post, and Washington Times. From 1959 into the 1960s, she wrote a syndicated North American Newspaper Alliance column. Then, in the '60s and '70s, she wrote a column for the Washington Daily News. After moving to Washington, D.C., in 1966, she spent 18 years producing "The Hemisphere Hotline," a newsletter focusing on inter-American affairs.

She was the author of three books, beginning with Reportage on Mexico (1941). This was followed by The Americas and Tomorrow in 1944. In the early 1950s, Prewett temporarily left journalism and attempted to establish a farm in the forests of Brazil. This experience resulted in her 1953 memoir Beyond the Great Forest.

For her coverage of Latin America, she received a Maria Moors Cabot Prize in 1964.

Prewett, described by some as a conservative journalist, was a co-founder of the Citizens Committee for a Free Cuba. She was honored for her work by the Brazilian and Guatemalan governments, for her opposition to Juan Perón and Fidel Castro, respectively. Prewett worked with the Council for Inter-American Security.

In 1949, she married William R. Mizelle, becoming Virginia Prewett Mizelle, but she continued to write under her maiden name.

She died in 1988 at age 69.
