= Short Mountain (Tennessee) =

Mountain in Tennessee, United States

- Location within Tennessee Location within the United States

Highest point
- Elevation: 2,074 ft (632 m)
- Prominence: 1,002 ft (305 m)
- Listing: Cannon County, Tennessee high point; Nashville metropolitan area high point
- Coordinates: 35°51′55″N 85°58′37″W

Geography
- Location: Highland Rim; Cannon County, Tennessee, U.S.
- Parent range: Cumberland Plateau
- Topo map: USGS Short Mountain

Geology
- Mountain type: Inselberg

Short Mountain is a mountain-sized monadnock that is the highest point in Cannon County, Tennessee and the Nashville metropolitan area. It is surrounded by the Highland Rim to the north, east and south but is an outlier of the Cumberland Plateau, evidenced by its sandstone caprock reaching over 2,000 feet (610 meters) in elevation; this makes it the westernmost part of Tennessee with an elevation over 2,000 feet (610 meters). Nearby Little Short Mountain to the east and Sugar Tree Knob to the west also stand well over 1,400 feet (427 meters) above sea level, and Little Short Mountain is even still high enough above nearby river valleys in the Nashville Basin to qualify as a Class 6 mountain, but they do not have sandstone caprock nor reach the height Short Mountain does.

== Hydrology ==
The headwaters of Mountain Creek drain out of a valley along the eastern slopes of Short Mountain, passing Little Short Mountain to the southwest and heading east to the Collins River, which in turn drains into the Caney Fork, Cumberland, Ohio and Lower Mississippi Rivers. This horseshoe-shaped mountain valley is the site of the Headwaters Wildlife Management Area, which was seized and repurposed by the state government after an illegal marijuana farm's owners were arrested. Dry Creek flows out of the north side of the Gap of the Mountain, the col between Short Mountain and Little Short Mountain, towards the Smith Fork, another major tributary of the Caney Fork River. A tiny tributary of Mountain Creek flows down the southern slope of the Gap of the Mountain. The Clear Fork of the Smith Fork also begins along the northern slope of Short Mountain, as do some of its tributaries; some other tributaries of the Clear Fork begin along the north slope of Sugar Tree Knob.

The East Fork Stones River and some of its tributaries begin along the southern slope of Short Mountain; some other tributaries of the East Fork Stones River begin along the southeastern and southwestern slopes of Sugar Tree Knob. The Stones River drains into the Cumberland River but, unlike Mountain Creek, Dry Creek and the Clear Fork, does not drain into the Caney Fork.

== Climate ==
The summit of Short Mountain was in USDA Hardiness Zone 6b in 2012 and 7a in 2023 while the surrounding plains and hills and Sugar Tree Knob were in Zone 7a in 2012 and 7b in 2023, indicating a cooler climate on the mountain summit. Little Short Mountain remained in Zone 7a in both recent publications.

== Culture ==
A Bible camp is located a little over 200 feet (61 meters) below the summit of Short Mountain on its northwestern slope. The locally owned Short Mountain Distillery is also nearby.

== Access ==
Gunter Hollow Road goes up the eastern slope of the mountain from Tennessee State Route 146; it is paved with chipseal. Firetower Road reaches the summit of the mountain and has a cul de sac at a tower but is an unpaved gravel road.
