= Lancaster, Tennessee =

- Unincorporated community
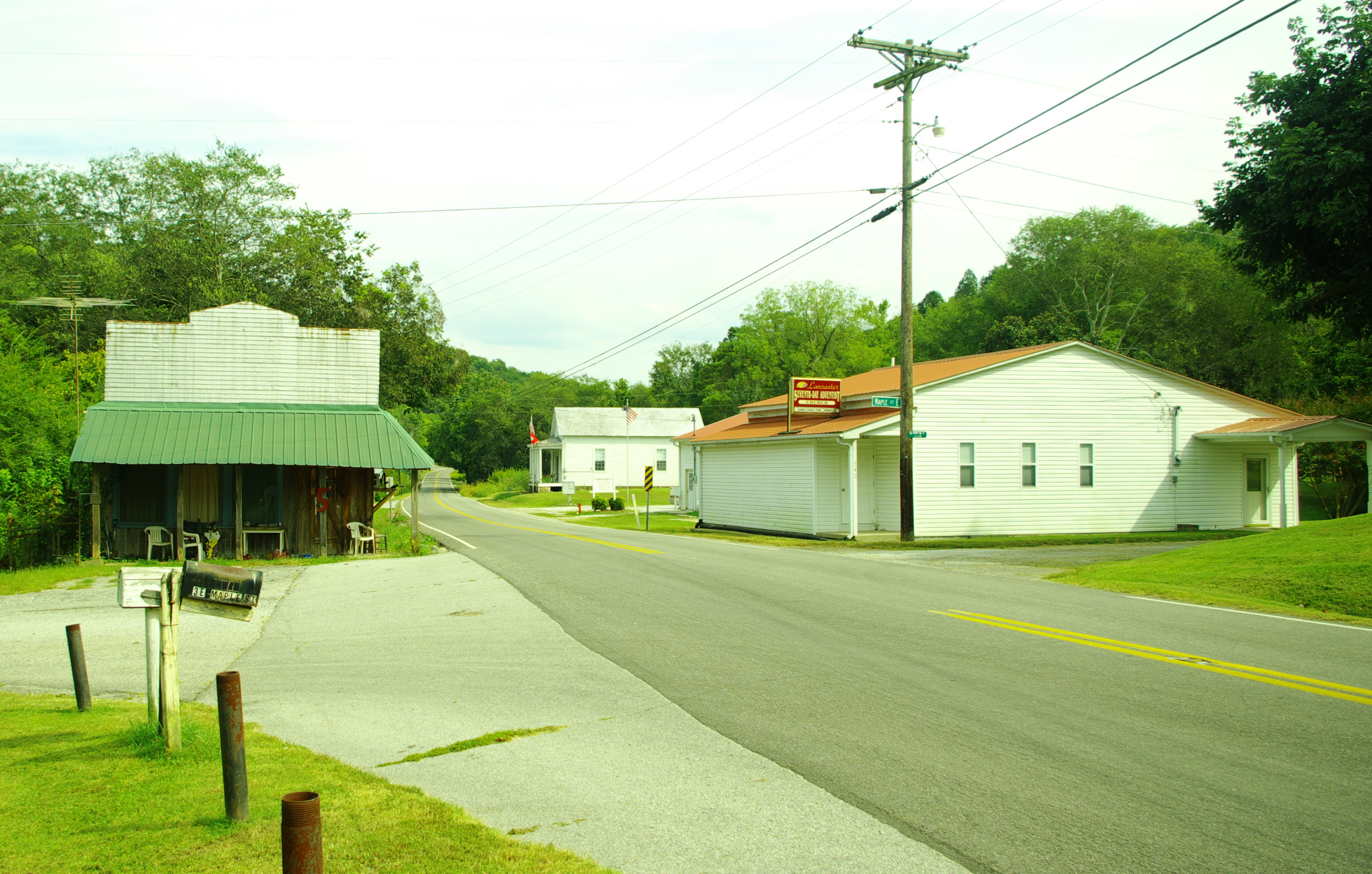
- Intersection of Highway 141 and Maple Street in Lancaster

- Location within Tennessee Location within the United States
- Coordinates: 36°07′40″N 85°52′08″W
- Country: United States
- State: Tennessee
- County: Smith
- Elevation: 531 ft (162 m)

Population (2010)
  - Total: 363
- Time zone: UTC-6 (Central (CST))
  - Summer (DST): UTC-5 (CDT)
- ZIP Code: 38569
- Area code: 615/629
- GNIS feature ID: 1290568

Lancaster is an unincorporated community in Smith County, Tennessee, United States, located 5.3 miles (8.5 km) southeast of Gordonsville. Lancaster had a post office with ZIP Code 38569, which closed on March 4, 2011, due to the United States Postal Service closing smaller post offices around the country.

As of 2010, the population of Lancaster's zip code tabulation area was 363. The community is situated along State Highway 141 between Gordonsville and Center Hill Lake, and is drained by Smith Fork, a tributary of the Caney Fork. Lancaster is named for John Lancaster Jr., an early settler who arrived in the area in the late 18th century (his family still owns a farm in the area, which has been designated a Tennessee Century Farm).

== See also ==
- Temperance Hall, Tennessee – a community of similar size located just to the southwest in DeKalb County
