= Westmoreland, Tennessee =

Westmoreland
- Town
- Westmoreland, Tennessee
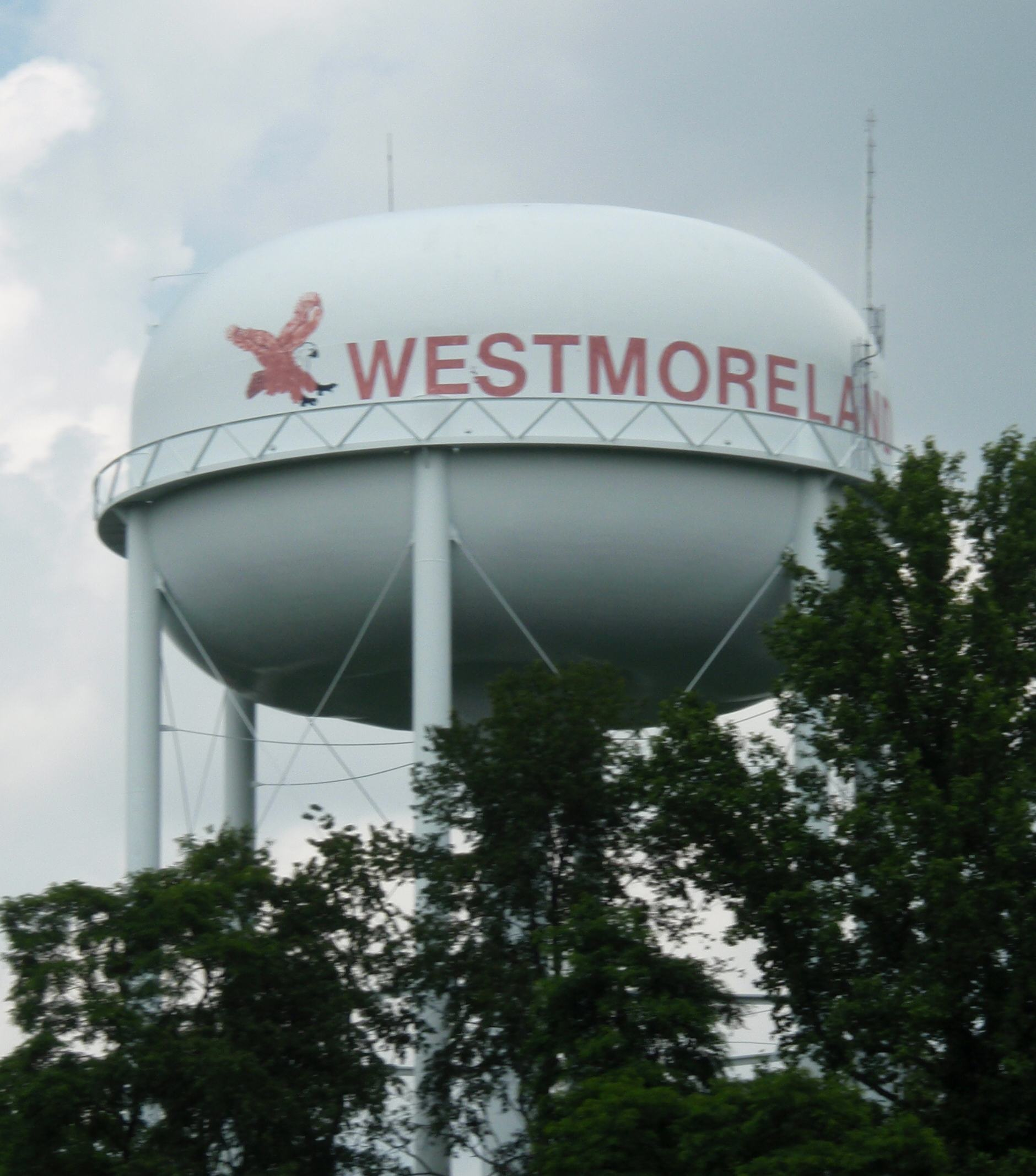
- Watertower in Westmoreland

- Location of Westmoreland in Sumner County, Tennessee.
- Coordinates: 36°33′43″N 86°14′53″W
- Country: United States
- State: Tennessee
- County: Sumner
- Incorporated: 1901
- Named for: Westmoreland (lumberman)

Area
  - Total: 4.36 sq mi (11.29 km^{2})
  - Land: 4.34 sq mi (11.24 km^{2})
  - Water: 0.019 sq mi (0.05 km^{2})
- Elevation: 925 ft (282 m)

Population (2020)
  - Total: 2,718
  - Density: 626.2/sq mi (241.78/km^{2})
- Time zone: UTC-6 (Central (CST))
  - Summer (DST): UTC-5 (CDT)
- ZIP code: 37186
- Area code: 615
- FIPS code: 47-79420
- GNIS feature ID: 1304492
- Website: westmorelandtn.gov

Westmoreland is a town in Sumner County, Tennessee, United States, bordering southern Kentucky. As of the 2020 census, Westmoreland had a population of 2,718. The town was named for a wealthy lumberman from North Carolina.

== History ==
Despite being a relatively small town, Westmoreland is notable for several things, among them having the shortest railway tunnel in the world, at 42 feet long.

Originally created in 1901 by a state charter, the town was officially incorporated to the State of Tennessee in February 1901. In the years that followed, it slowly grew to the albeit small population it had today.

In the early 2000s, the Westmoreland Elementary school shut down, and relocated to a school closer to the Middle and High schools. The building today stands as Westmoreland Dream Center, and is a hub for can food drives and some boy scout activities.

The town claims to have the smallest railroad tunnel in the world, built in 1887, which is approximately 45 feet long. It is sometimes called "Little Tunnel". However, a tunnel in Backbone Rock Recreation Area, Shady Valley, Tennessee, also claims to be the shortest.

A mural in Town Square depicts the tunnel, along with a few other notable buildings and places.

== Geography ==
According to the United States Census Bureau, the town has a total area of 3.8 square miles (9.8 km^{2}), of which 3.8 square miles (9.8 km^{2}) is land and 0.04 square miles (0.10 km^{2}) (0.52%) is water.

== Demographics ==
Historical population
Census	Pop.	Note	%±
1960	865		—
1970	1,423		64.5%
1980	1,754		23.3%
1990	1,726		−1.6%
2000	2,093		21.3%
2010	2,206		5.4%
2020	2,718		23.2%

=== 2020 census ===
Westmoreland racial composition
Race	Number	Percentage
White (non-Hispanic)	2,449	90.1%
Black or African American (non-Hispanic)	36	1.32%
Native American	4	0.15%
Asian	26	0.96%
Other/Mixed	128	4.71%
Hispanic or Latino	75	2.76%

As of the 2020 United States census, there were 2,718 people, 990 households, and 646 families residing in the town.

=== 2000 census ===
As of the census of 2000, there were 2,093 people, 804 households, and 561 families residing in the town. The population density was 547.5 inhabitants per square mile (211.4/km^{2}). There were 874 housing units at an average density of 228.6 units per square mile (88.3 units/km^{2}). The racial makeup of the town was 98.85% White, 0.55% African American, 0.24% Native American, 0.05% Asian, 0.05% Pacific Islander, 0.29% from other races, and 0.48% from two or more races. Hispanic or Latino of any race were 0.13% of the population.

There were 804 households, out of which 34.7% had children under the age of 18 living with them, 54.4% were married couples living together, 11.3% had a female householder with no husband present, and 30.2% were non-families. 27.1% of all households were made up of individuals, and 14.6% had someone living alone who was 65 years of age or older. The average household size was 2.48 and the average family size was 3.01.

In the town, the population was spread out, with 25.3% under the age of 18, 8.3% from 18 to 24, 26.9% from 25 to 44, 22.5% from 45 to 64, and 17.0% who were 65 years of age or older. The median age was 36 years. For every 100 females, there were 80.6 males. For every 100 females age 18 and over, there were 77.4 males.

The median income for a household in the town was $28,958, and the median income for a family was $36,944. Males had a median income of $25,795 versus $19,366 for females. The per capita income for the town was $13,185. About 8.7% of families and 13.2% of the population were below the poverty line, including 13.7% of those under age 18 and 17.6% of those age 65 or over.

== Gallery ==
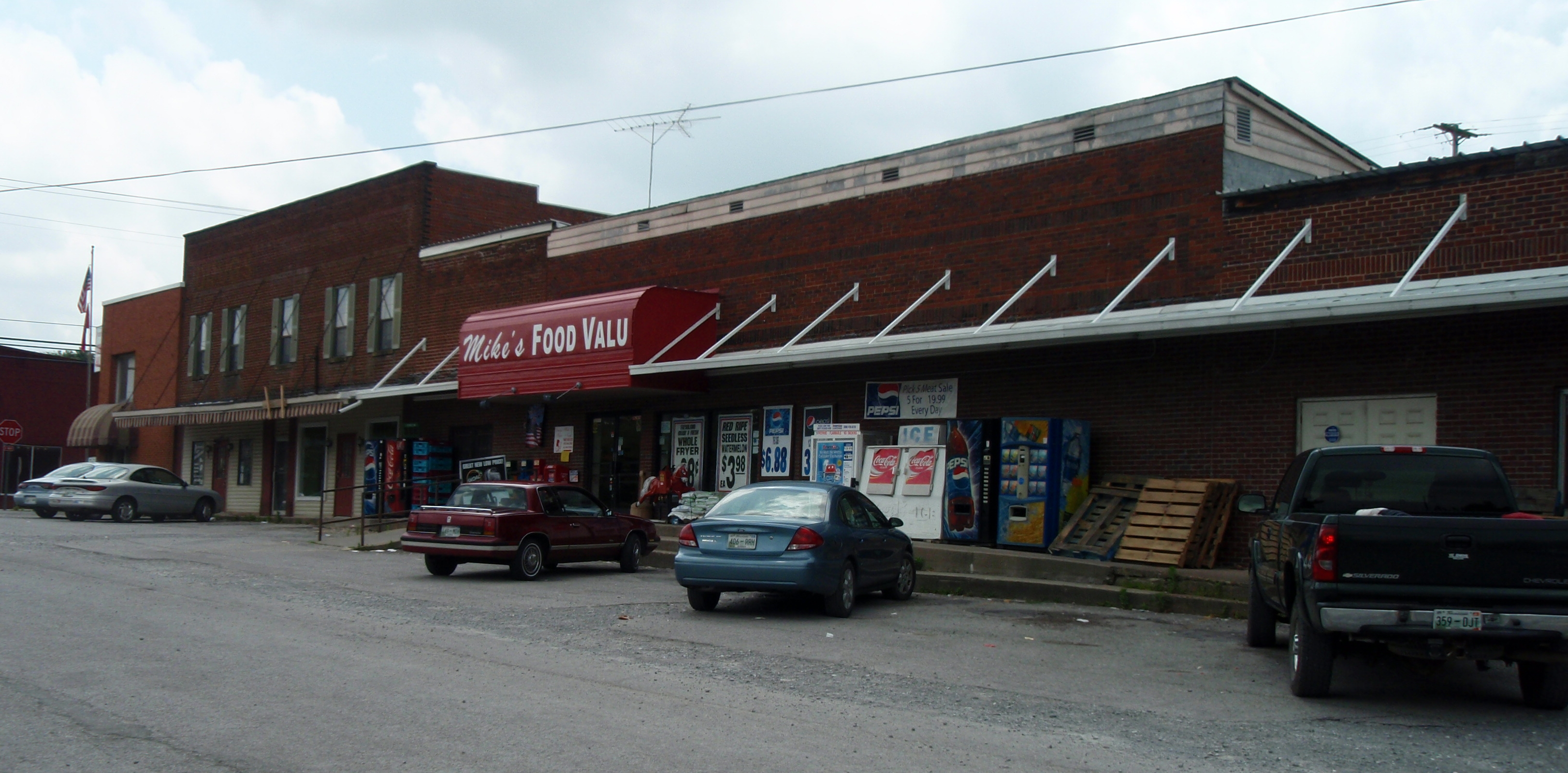
Business District of Westmoreland

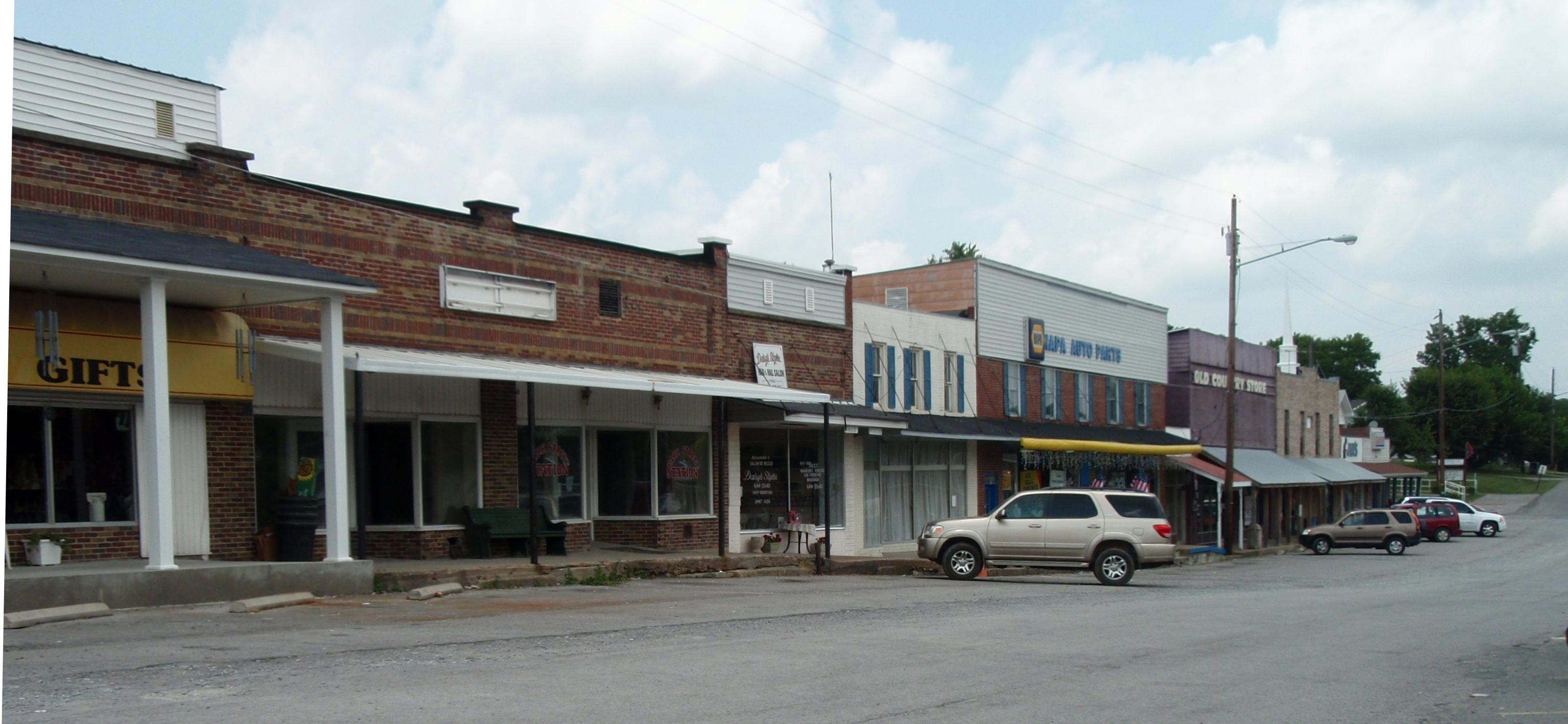
Another view of the Business District of Westmoreland

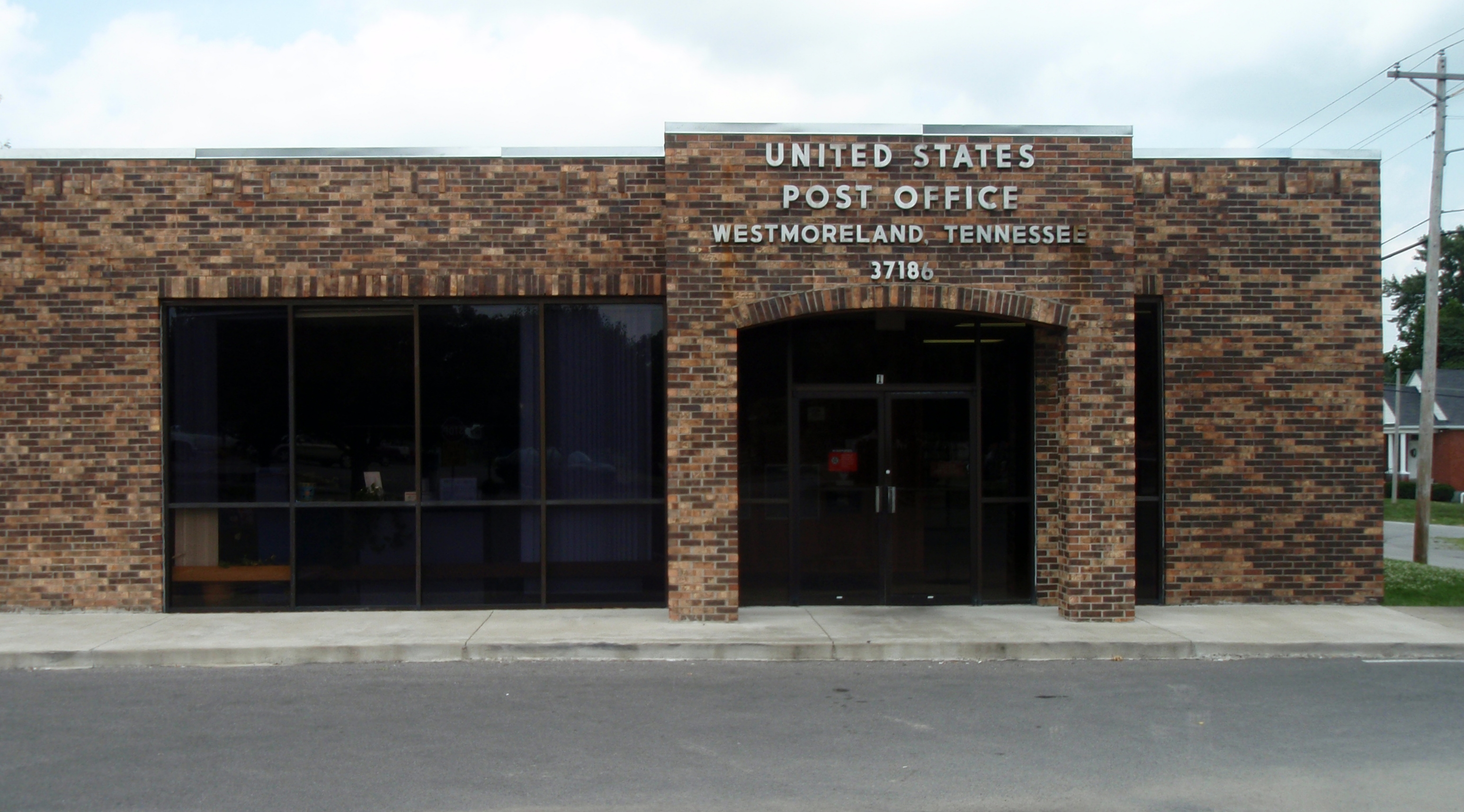
Post office in Westmoreland

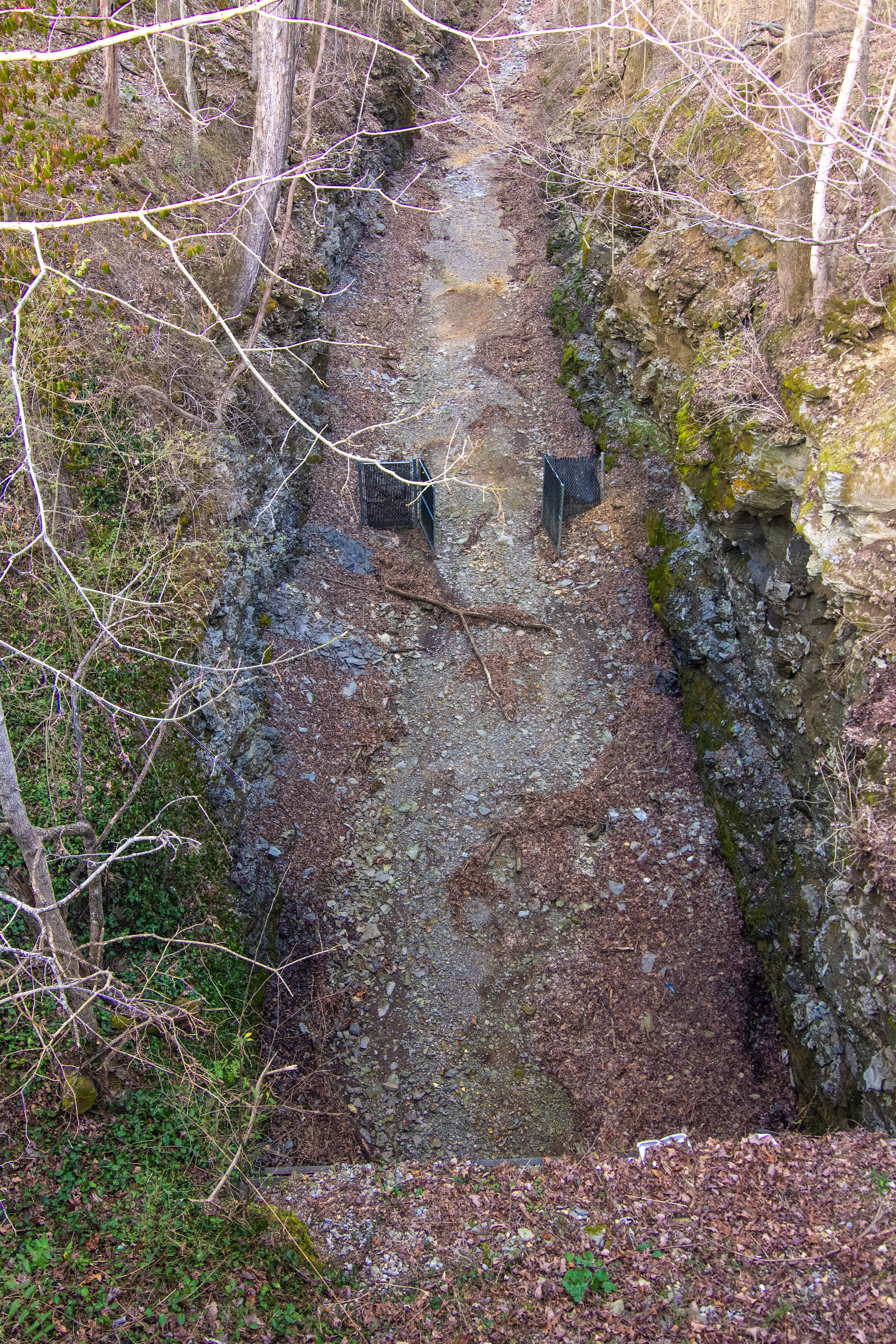
Westmoreland Tunnell
