= Brush Creek, Smith County, Tennessee =

Brush Creek, Tennessee
- Unincorporated community
- Location within Tennessee Location within the United States
- Coordinates: 36°07′02″N 86°01′40″W
- Country: United States
- State: Tennessee
- County: Smith
- Elevation: 643 ft (196 m)
- Time zone: UTC-6 (Central (CST))
  - Summer (DST): UTC-5 (CDT)
- ZIP code: 38547
- Area code: 615
- GNIS feature ID: 1305471

Brush Creek is an unincorporated community in Smith County, Tennessee, United States. The zipcode is: 38547.

== Demographics ==
ZIP Code 38547 has 2,100 residents and 780 households (average 2.69 persons per household). The median age is 39.2 years, about the same as the state (39.1) and about the same as the nation (38.8). The gender split is 49.5% male and 50.5% female, which is about the same as the state male share (48.7%). Largest groups are White (94.8%, much higher than the state average of 72.2% and well above the national average of 61.6%) and Hispanic or Latino (1.6%); Hispanic or Latino residents make up 1.6%, which is much lower than the national average (18.7%).
