= South Carthage, Tennessee =

- Town
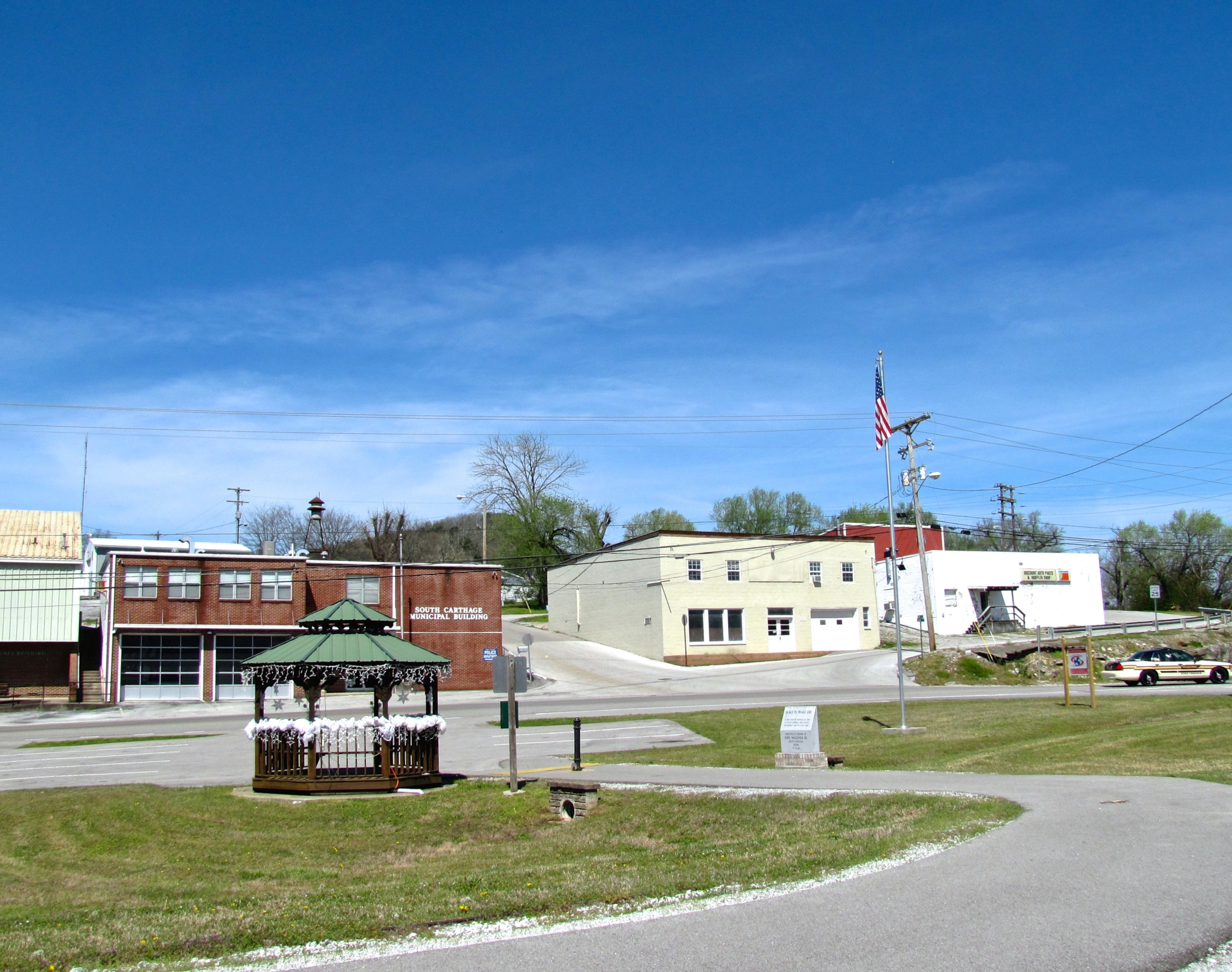
- Buildings along Old Highway 53

- Location of South Carthage in Smith County, Tennessee.
- Coordinates: 36°14′44″N 85°57′29″W
- Country: United States
- State: Tennessee
- County: Smith

Area
  - Total: 2.64 sq mi (6.84 km^{2})
  - Land: 2.56 sq mi (6.64 km^{2})
  - Water: 0.077 sq mi (0.20 km^{2})
- Elevation: 509 ft (155 m)

Population (2020)
  - Total: 1,490
  - Density: 581.3/sq mi (224.45/km^{2})
- Time zone: UTC-6 (Central (CST))
  - Summer (DST): UTC-5 (CDT)
- FIPS code: 47-69680
- GNIS feature ID: 1270836
- Website: https://www.townofsouthcarthage.com/

South Carthage is a town in Smith County, Tennessee, United States. As of the 2020 census, South Carthage had a population of 1,490. The town is located along the Cumberland River opposite Carthage .

== Geography ==
South Carthage is located at 36°14′44″N 85°57′29″W (36.245584, -85.958043). The town stretches along the south bank of the Cumberland River from Goodall Island eastward to the river's confluence with the Caney Fork (river miles 306-309). South Carthage is traversed by U.S. Route 70N, and the highway's key intersection with State Route 25 and State Route 53 is located within the town's southeastern limits. The town is connected to Carthage via two bridges: the Cordell Hull Bridge on the west, and Veterans Memorial Bridge (which carries SR 25) on the east.

According to the United States Census Bureau, the town has a total area of 2.7 square miles (7.0 km^{2}), of which 2.6 square miles (6.8 km^{2}) is land and 0.077 square miles (0.2 km^{2}), or 2.91%, is water.

== Demographics ==
Historical population
Census	Pop.	Note	%±
1970	859		—
1980	1,004		16.9%
1990	851		−15.2%
2000	1,302		53.0%
2010	1,322		1.5%
2020	1,490		12.7%

=== 2020 census ===
South Carthage racial composition
Race	Number	Percentage
White (non-Hispanic)	1,324	88.86%
Black or African American (non-Hispanic)	48	3.22%
Native American	3	0.2%
Asian	14	0.94%
Other/Mixed	52	3.49%
Hispanic or Latino	49	3.29%

As of the 2020 United States census, there were 1,490 people, 536 households, and 344 families residing in the town.

=== 2000 census ===
As of the census of 2000, there were 1,302 people, 554 households, and 366 families residing in the town. The population density was 501.0 inhabitants per square mile (193.4/km^{2}). There were 589 housing units at an average density of 226.6 per square mile (87.5/km^{2}). The racial makeup of the town was 95.31% White, 2.46% African American, 0.08% Native American, 0.23% Asian, 0.54% from other races, and 1.38% from two or more races. Hispanic or Latino of any race were 1.38% of the population.

There were 554 households, out of which 33.0% had children under the age of 18 living with them, 50.2% were married couples living together, 12.8% had a female householder with no husband present, and 33.9% were non-families. 30.9% of all households were made up of individuals, and 16.6% had someone living alone who was 65 years of age or older. The average household size was 2.35 and the average family size was 2.92.

In the town, the population was spread out, with 25.4% under the age of 18, 7.1% from 18 to 24, 29.7% from 25 to 44, 21.4% from 45 to 64, and 16.4% who were 65 years of age or older. The median age was 37 years. For every 100 females, there were 86.0 males. For every 100 females age 18 and over, there were 79.8 males.

The median income for a household in the town was $30,592, and the median income for a family was $35,066. Males had a median income of $31,080 versus $20,577 for females. The per capita income for the town was $14,425. About 10.7% of families and 15.2% of the population were below the poverty line, including 14.6% of those under age 18 and 24.6% of those age 65 or over.
