= Alexandria, Tennessee =

- Town
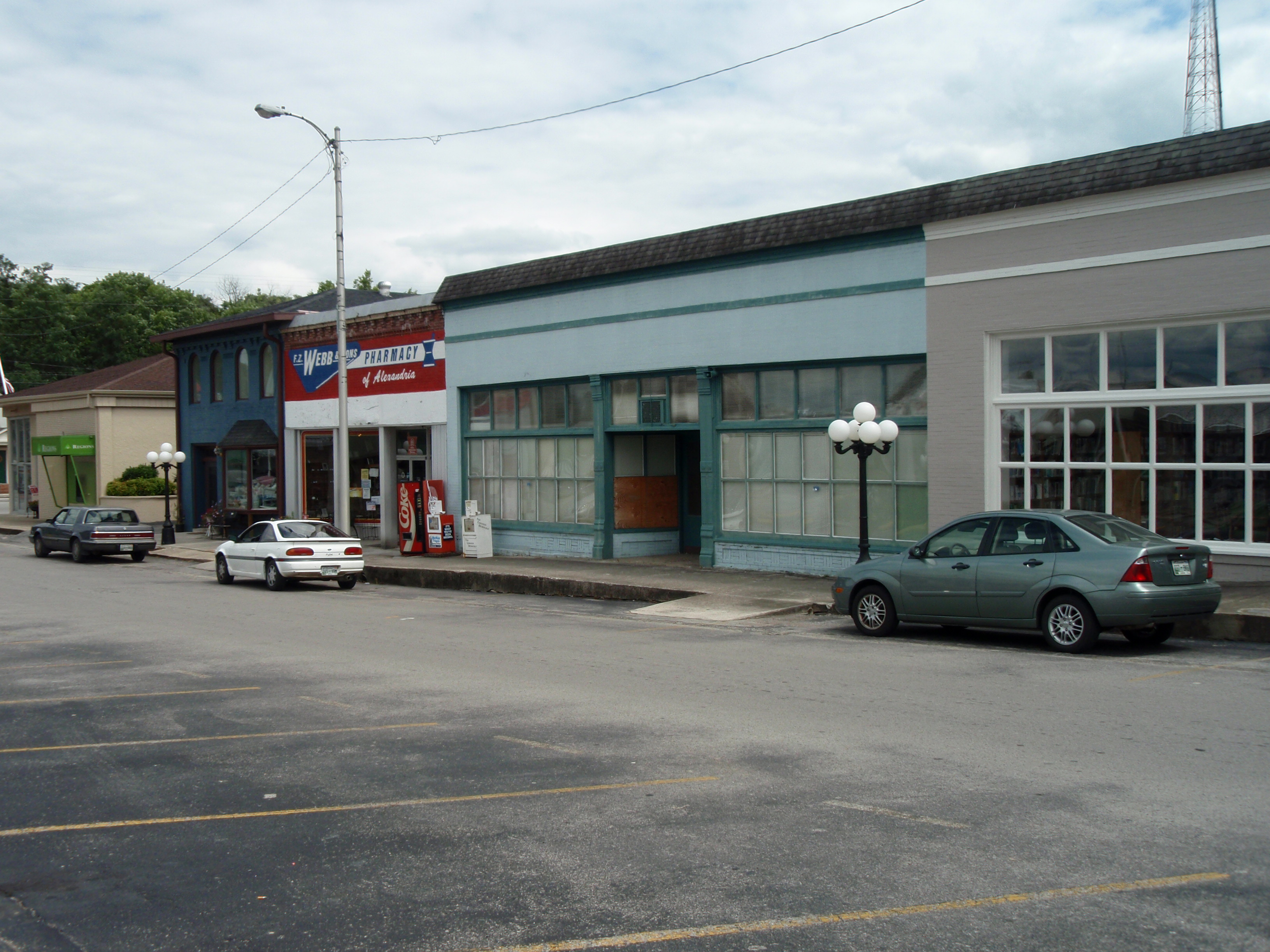
- Shops in Alexandria

- Location of Alexandria in DeKalb County, Tennessee.

- Location within Tennessee Location within the United States Location within North America
- Coordinates: 36°4′38″N 86°2′0″W
- Country: United States
- State: Tennessee
- County: DeKalb

Area
  - Total: 2.03 sq mi (5.25 km^{2})
  - Land: 2.03 sq mi (5.25 km^{2})
  - Water: 0 sq mi (0.00 km^{2})
- Elevation: 653 ft (199 m)

Population (2020)
  - Total: 981
  - Density: 484.4/sq mi (187.03/km^{2})
- Time zone: UTC-6 (Central (CST))
  - Summer (DST): UTC-5 (CDT)
- ZIP code: 37012
- Area code: 615
- FIPS code: 47-00620
- GNIS feature ID: 1313829
- Website: www.townofalexandria.us

Alexandria is a town in DeKalb County, Tennessee, United States. The population was 981 at the 2020 census.

== History ==
Alexandria was founded in 1820 by Dr. Daniel Alexander, and named for him. A post office has been in operation there since 1838.

== Geography ==
Alexandria is located in the northwest corner of DeKalb County, bordered to the north by Smith County and at its western tip by Wilson County. U.S. Route 70 (Nashville Highway) passes through the southwest side of the town, leading northwest 18 miles (29 km) to Lebanon and southeast 17 miles (27 km) to Smithville, the DeKalb County seat. Tennessee State Route 53 passes just east of the town, leading north 7 miles (11 km) to Interstate 40 at New Middleton.

According to the United States Census Bureau, the town has a total area of 2.0 square miles (5.2 km^{2}), all of it land. Hickman Creek flows to the northeast through the town; it is a tributary of the Caney Fork River, part of the Cumberland River watershed.

== Demographics ==
Historical population
Census	Pop.	Note	%±
1850	343		—
1920	510		—
1930	449		−12.0%
1940	388		−13.6%
1950	372		−4.1%
1960	599		61.0%
1970	680		13.5%
1980	689		1.3%
1990	730		6.0%
2000	814		11.5%
2010	966		18.7%
2020	981		1.6%

=== 2020 census ===
Alexandria racial composition
Race	Number	Percentage
White (non-Hispanic)	860	87.67%
Black or African American (non-Hispanic)	38	3.87%
Native American	6	0.61%
Asian	2	0.2%
Other/Mixed	63	6.42%
Hispanic or Latino	12	1.22%

As of the 2020 United States census, there were 981 people, 397 households, and 269 families residing in the town.

=== 2000 census ===
As of the census of 2000, there were 814 people, 349 households, and 226 families residing in the town. The population density was 901.3 inhabitants per square mile (348.0/km^{2}). There were 383 housing units at an average density of 424.1 per square mile (163.7/km^{2}). The racial makeup of the town was 90.17% White, 7.74% African American, 0.25% Native American, 0.12% Asian, 0.49% from other races, and 1.23% from two or more races. Hispanic or Latino of any race were 0.25% of the population.

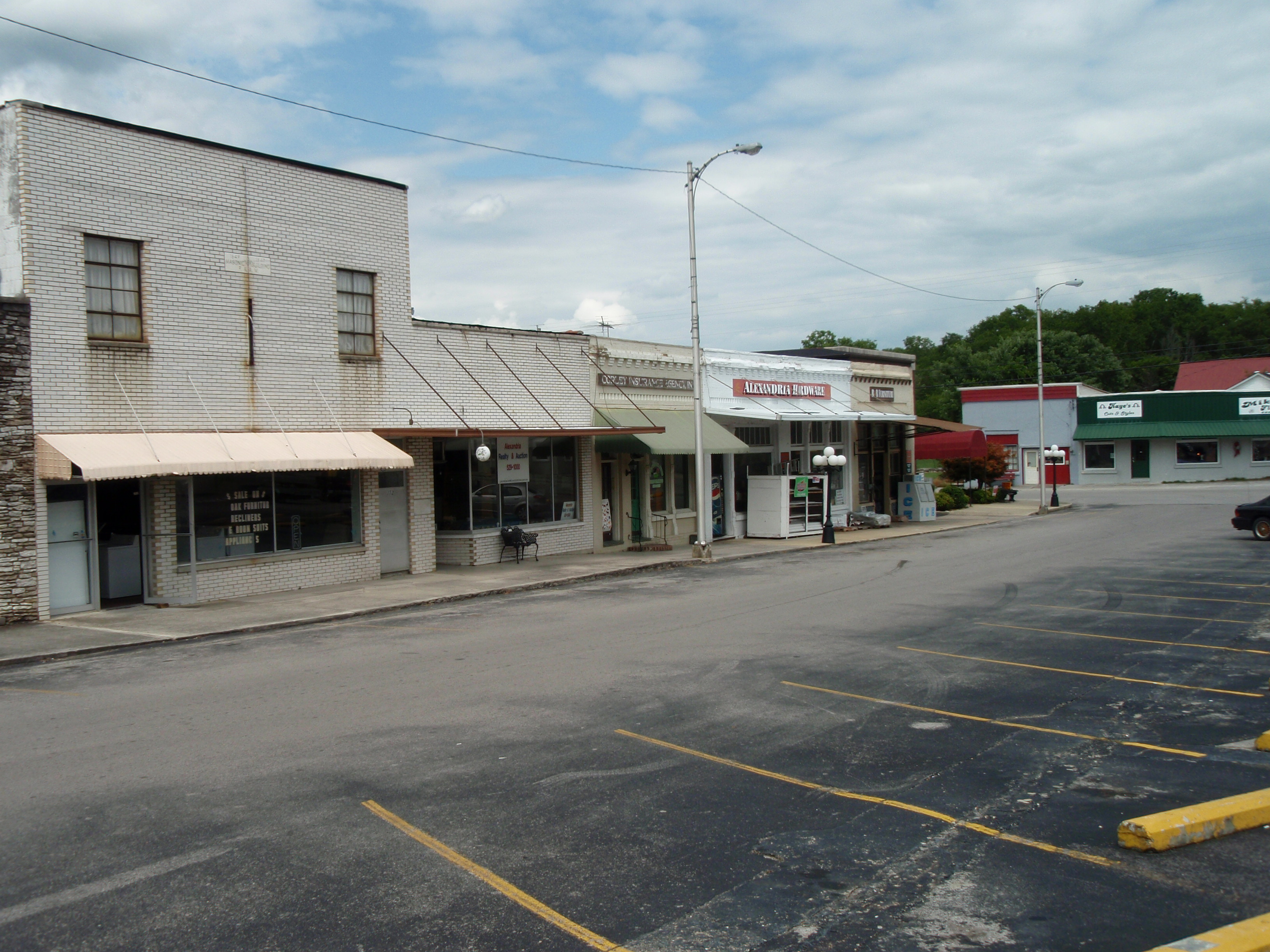
Downtown Alexandria

There were 349 households, out of which 26.6% had children under the age of 18 living with them, 47.0% were married couples living together, 13.8% had a female householder with no husband present, and 35.2% were non-families. 33.0% of all households were made up of individuals, and 18.9% had someone living alone who was 65 years of age or older. The average household size was 2.33 and the average family size was 2.97.

In the town, the population was spread out, with 24.9% under the age of 18, 9.1% from 18 to 24, 25.8% from 25 to 44, 22.0% from 45 to 64, and 18.2% who were 65 years of age or older. The median age was 37 years. For every 100 females, there were 81.3 males. For every 100 females age 18 and over, there were 76.6 males.

The median income for a household in the town was $29,219, and the median income for a family was $38,250. Males had a median income of $27,083 versus $21,429 for females. The per capita income for the town was $13,344. About 16.3% of families and 19.9% of the population were below the poverty line, including 26.5% of those under age 18 and 17.8% of those age 65 or over.

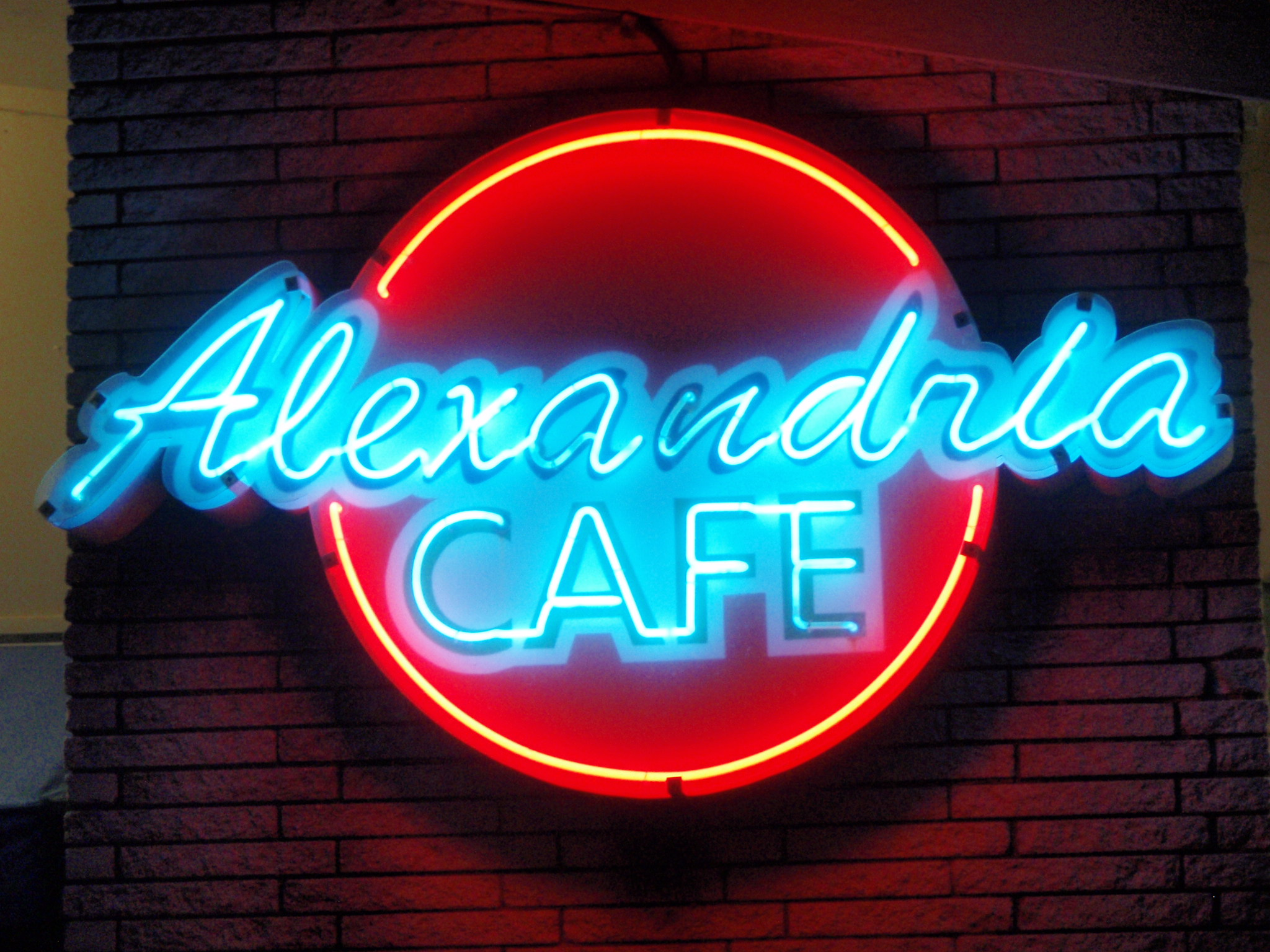
