= Hickman, Tennessee =

- Unincorporated community
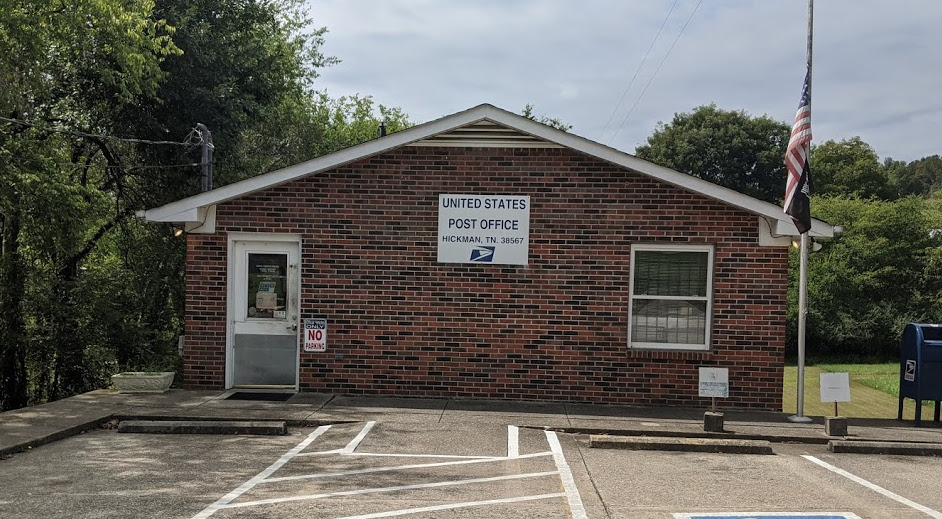
- US Post Office in Hickman, Tennessee

- Location within Tennessee Location within the United States
- Coordinates: 36°08′38″N 85°56′26″W
- Country: United States
- State: Tennessee
- County: Smith

Area
  - Total: 1.52 sq mi (3.94 km^{2})
  - Land: 1.52 sq mi (3.94 km^{2})
  - Water: 0 sq mi (0.00 km^{2})
- Elevation: 505 ft (154 m)

Population (2020)
  - Total: 224
  - Density: 147.1/sq mi (56.81/km^{2})
- Time zone: UTC-6 (Central (CST))
  - Summer (DST): UTC-5 (CDT)
- ZIP code: 38567
- Area code: 615
- GNIS feature ID: 1293729

Hickman is an unincorporated community in Smith County, Tennessee, United States. Its ZIP code is 38567.

== Demographics ==
Historical population
Census	Pop.	Note	%±
2020	224		—
U.S. Decennial Census
