= Elmwood, Tennessee =

- Unincorporated community
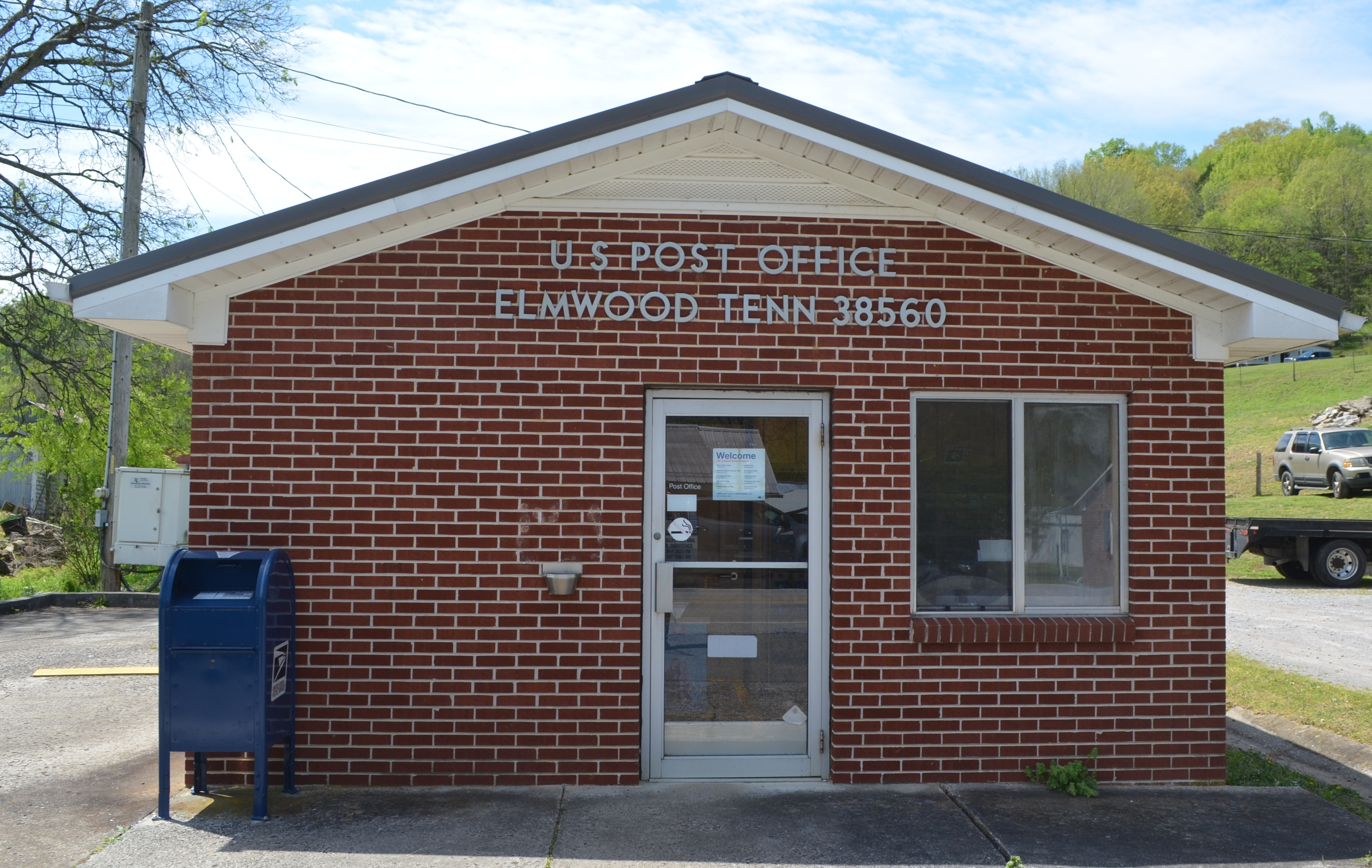
- US Post Office in Elmwood

- Location within Tennessee Location within the United States
- Coordinates: 36°13′33″N 85°53′05″W
- Country: United States
- State: Tennessee
- County: Smith
- Elevation: 512 ft (156 m)
- Time zone: UTC-6 (Central (CST))
  - Summer (DST): UTC-5 (CDT)
- ZIP code: 38560
- Area code: 615
- GNIS feature ID: 1283724

Elmwood is an unincorporated community in Smith County, Tennessee, United States. Its ZIP code is 38560.
