= Dowelltown, Tennessee =

- Town
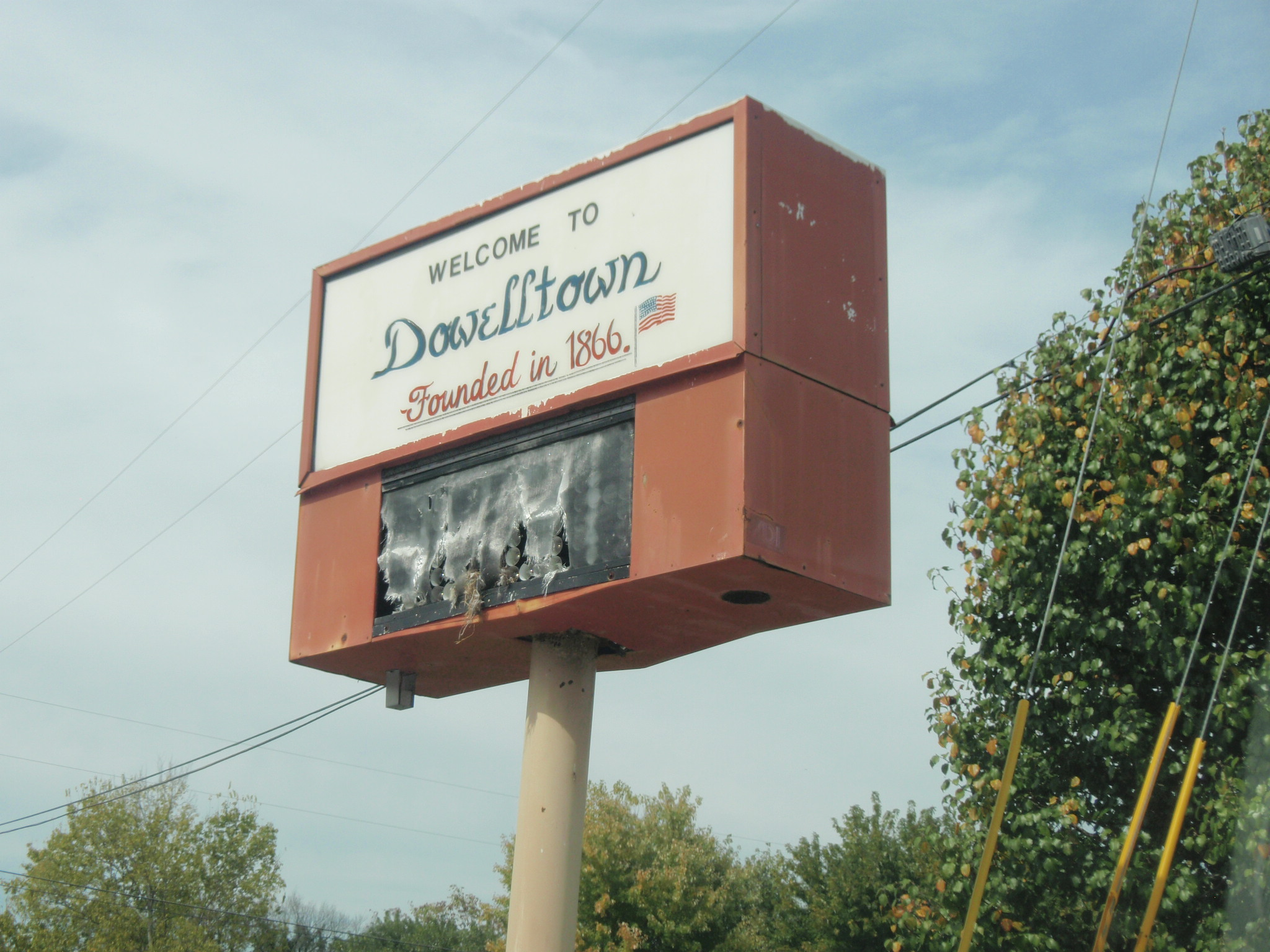
- Sign in Dowelltown

- Location of Dowelltown in DeKalb County, Tennessee.
- Coordinates: 36°0′47″N 85°56′35″W
- Country: United States
- State: Tennessee
- County: DeKalb

Area
  - Total: 0.75 sq mi (1.95 km^{2})
  - Land: 0.75 sq mi (1.95 km^{2})
  - Water: 0 sq mi (0.00 km^{2})
- Elevation: 577 ft (176 m)

Population (2020)
  - Total: 342
  - Density: 454.6/sq mi (175.52/km^{2})
- Time zone: UTC-6 (Central (CST))
  - Summer (DST): UTC-5 (CDT)
- ZIP code: 37059
- Area code: 615
- FIPS code: 47-21420
- GNIS feature ID: 1313913

Dowelltown is a town in DeKalb County, Tennessee, United States. As of the 2020 census, Dowelltown had a population of 342.

== Geography ==
Dowelltown is located at 36°0′47″N 85°56′35″W (36.013127, -85.943054).

According to the United States Census Bureau, the town has a total area of 0.8 square miles (2.1 km^{2}), all of it land.

== Demographics ==
Historical population
Census	Pop.	Note	%±
1880	210		—
1890	233		11.0%
1950	262		—
1960	279		6.5%
1970	329		17.9%
1980	341		3.6%
1990	308		−9.7%
2000	302		−1.9%
2010	355		17.5%
2020	342		−3.7%

As of the census of 2000, there were 302 people, 134 households, and 90 families residing in the town. The population density was 386.7 inhabitants per square mile (149.3/km^{2}). There were 147 housing units at an average density of 188.2 per square mile (72.7/km^{2}). The racial makeup of the town was 93.05% White, 3.31% African American, 0.33% Native American, 0.33% Pacific Islander, 1.99% from other races, and 0.99% from two or more races. Hispanic or Latino of any race were 2.32% of the population.

There were 134 households, out of which 27.6% had children under the age of 18 living with them, 50.0% were married couples living together, 11.2% had a female householder with no husband present, and 32.8% were non-families. 32.8% of all households were made up of individuals, and 17.2% had someone living alone who was 65 years of age or older. The average household size was 2.25 and the average family size was 2.86.

In the town, the population was spread out, with 24.2% under the age of 18, 7.3% from 18 to 24, 28.1% from 25 to 44, 24.8% from 45 to 64, and 15.6% who were 65 years of age or older. The median age was 39 years. For every 100 females, there were 98.7 males. For every 100 females age 18 and over, there were 84.7 males.

The median income for a household in the town was $22,273, and the median income for a family was $31,500. Males had a median income of $28,750 versus $20,469 for females. The per capita income for the town was $10,757. About 23.2% of families and 26.9% of the population were below the poverty line, including 39.8% of those under the age of eighteen and 25.0% of those 65 or over.

== Gallery ==
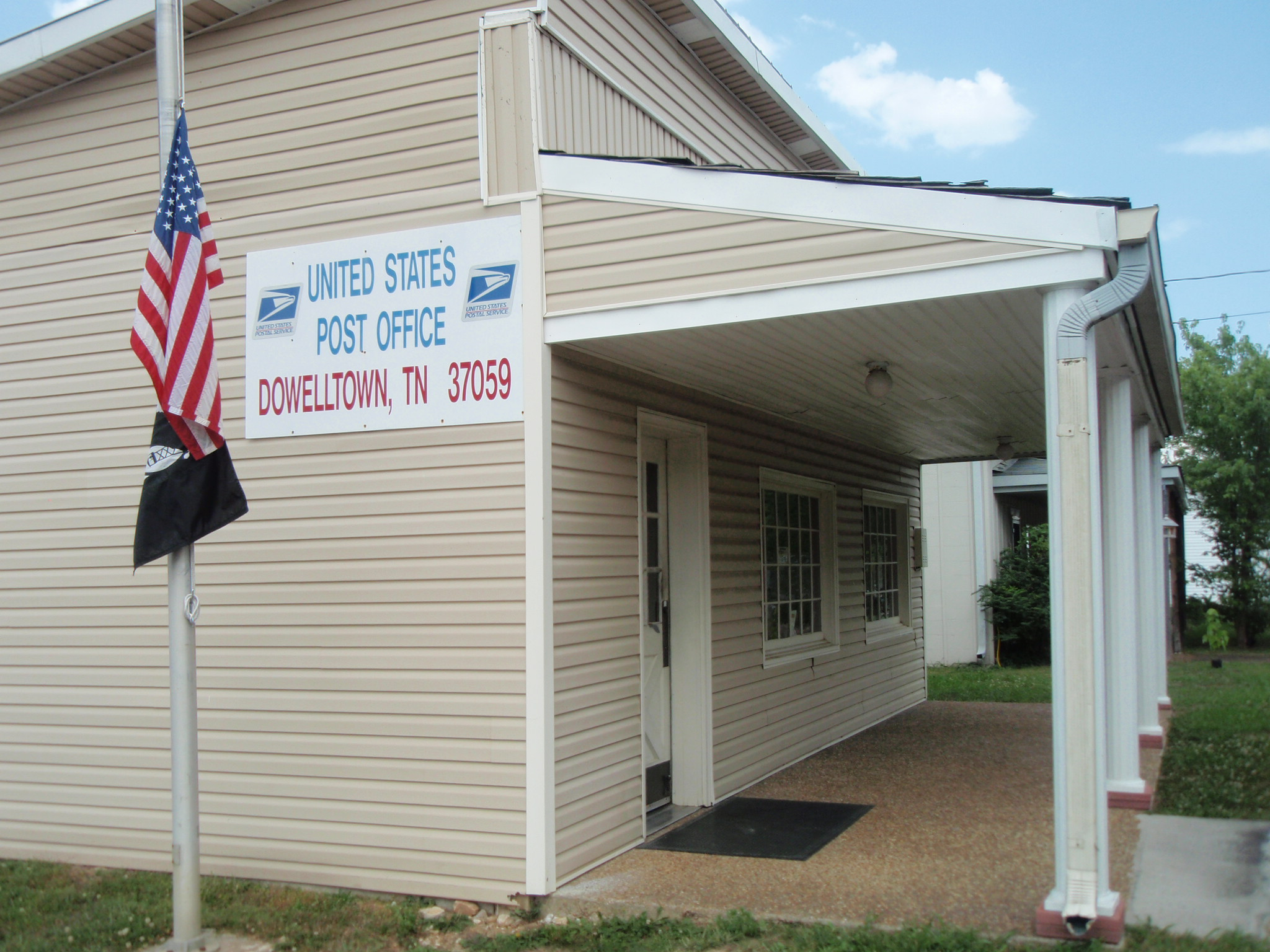
Post office in Dowelltown

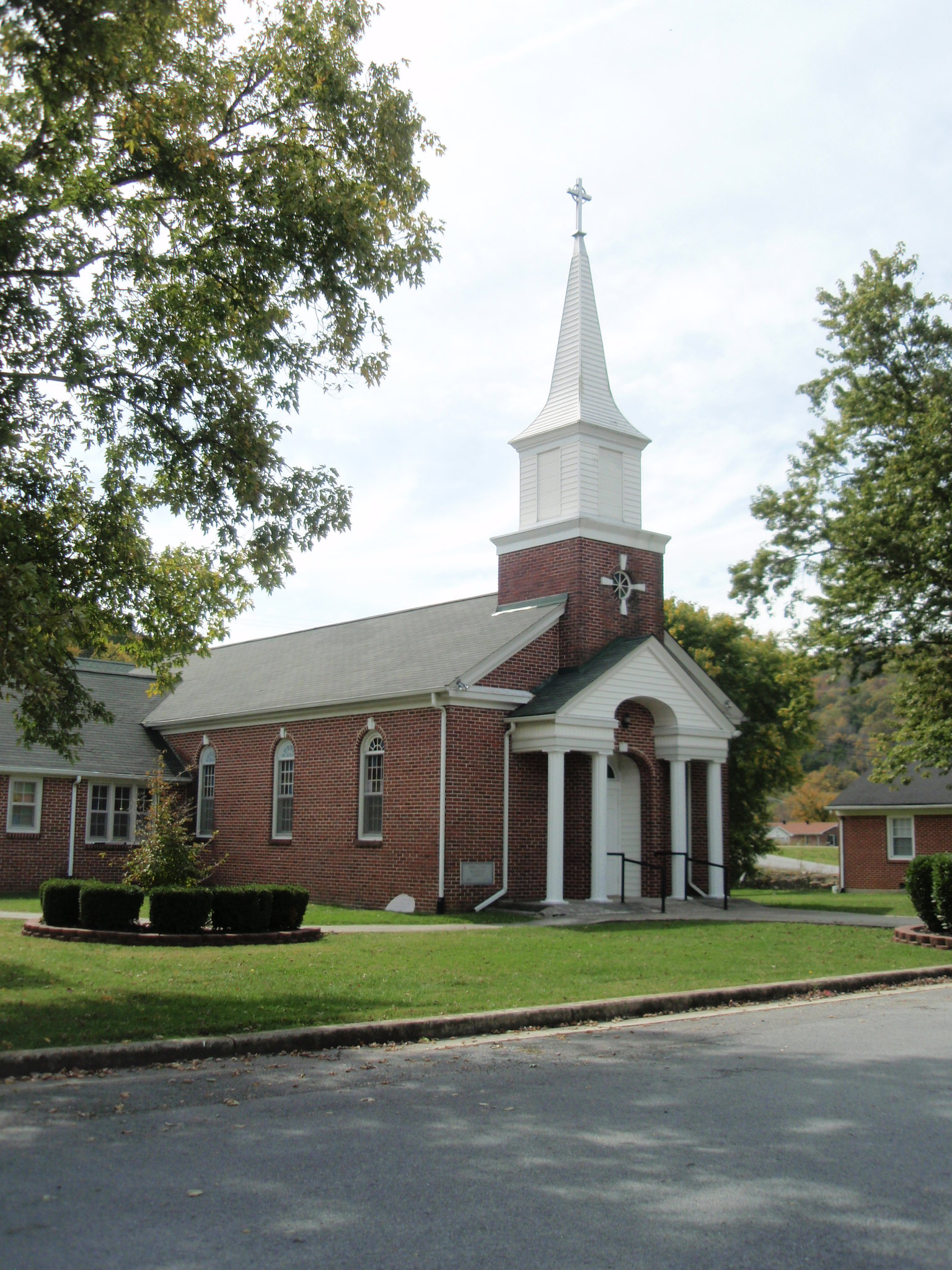
Dowelltown United Methodist Church
