= Gordonsville, Tennessee =

- Town
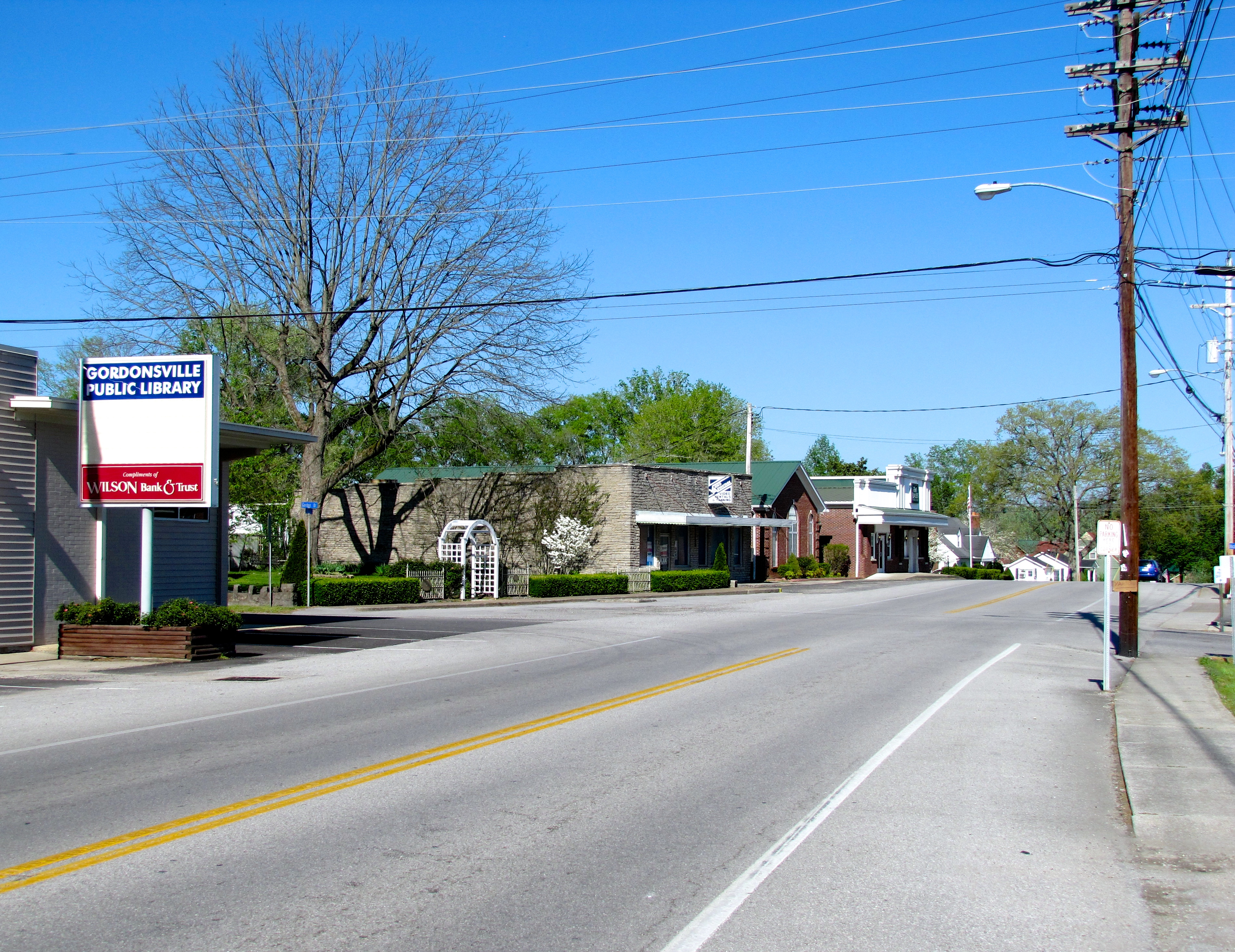
- Main Street in Gordonsville

- Location of Gordonsville in Smith County, Tennessee.
- Coordinates: 36°10′38″N 85°55′50″W
- Country: United States
- State: Tennessee
- County: Smith
- Incorporated: 1909
- Named after: Gordon family (early settlers)

Area
  - Total: 7.16 sq mi (18.55 km^{2})
  - Land: 7.11 sq mi (18.42 km^{2})
  - Water: 0.050 sq mi (0.13 km^{2})
- Elevation: 538 ft (164 m)

Population (2020)
  - Total: 1,363
  - Density: 191.7/sq mi (74.01/km^{2})
- Time zone: UTC-6 (Central (CST))
  - Summer (DST): UTC-5 (CDT)
- ZIP code: 38563
- Area code: 615
- FIPS code: 47-30120
- GNIS feature ID: 1285704
- Website: www.townofgordonsville.com

Gordonsville is a town in Smith County, Tennessee, United States. As of the 2020 census, Gordonsville had a population of 1,363.

== Geography ==
Gordonsville is located at 36°10′38″N 85°55′50″W (36.177215, -85.930548).

According to the United States Census Bureau, the town has a total area of 7.1 square miles (18.4 km^{2}), of which 7.1 square miles (18.3 km^{2}) is land and 0.039 square miles (0.1 km^{2}), or 0.70%, is water.

== Demographics ==
Historical population
Census	Pop.	Note	%±
1880	184		—
1910	245		—
1920	278		13.5%
1930	280		0.7%
1940	250		−10.7%
1950	304		21.6%
1960	249		−18.1%
1970	601		141.4%
1980	893		48.6%
1990	891		−0.2%
2000	1,066		19.6%
2010	1,213		13.8%
2020	1,363		12.4%

=== 2020 census ===
Gordonsville racial composition
Race	Number	Percentage
White (non-Hispanic)	1,200	88.04%
Black or African American (non-Hispanic)	35	2.57%
Asian	19	1.39%
Other/Mixed	92	6.75%
Hispanic or Latino	17	1.25%

As of the 2020 United States census, there were 1,363 people, 594 households, and 452 families residing in the town.

=== 2000 census ===
As of the census of 2000, there were 1,066 people, 446 households, and 312 families residing in the town. The population density was 154.3 inhabitants per square mile (59.6/km^{2}). There were 463 housing units at an average density of 67.0 per square mile (25.9/km^{2}). The racial makeup of the town was 94.84% White, 3.85% African American, 0.19% Native American, 0.19% Asian, 0.28% from other races, and 0.66% from two or more races. Hispanic or Latino of any race were 0.56% of the population.

There were 446 households, out of which 30.7% had children under the age of 18 living with them, 56.5% were married couples living together, 11.7% had a female householder with no husband present, and 30.0% were non-families. 28.3% of all households were made up of individuals, and 13.2% had someone living alone who was 65 years of age or older. The average household size was 2.39 and the average family size was 2.92.

In the town, the population was spread out, with 24.0% under the age of 18, 7.5% from 18 to 24, 31.3% from 25 to 44, 22.0% from 45 to 64, and 15.2% who were 65 years of age or older. The median age was 38 years. For every 100 females, there were 91.4 males. For every 100 females age 18 and over, there were 83.7 males.

The median income for a household in the town was $36,842, and the median income for a family was $45,250. Males had a median income of $29,688 versus $21,442 for females. The per capita income for the town was $16,299. About 10.1% of families and 11.6% of the population were below the poverty line, including 21.2% of those under age 18 and 10.0% of those age 65 or over.

== Government ==
Gordonsville is governed by an elected mayor and a board of five elected aldermen. It is the duty of the mayor to preside over the monthly council meeting and to break ties among the aldermen but not to directly vote. Gordonsville has its own public works, sanitation, police, and fire departments. Gordonsville is given fire protection by the Gordonsville Fire Department and a mutual aid agreement with the county and other city fire departments.

== Notable people ==
- Tommy Bridges, baseball player and scout.
- Jeff Bennett, professional baseball player
- Virginia Prewett, journalist
