= Tennessee State Route 263 =

State highway in Tennessee, United States

State Route 263
- SR 263 highlighted in red

Route information
- Maintained by TDOT
- Length: 5.0 mi (8.0 km)
- Existed: July 1, 1983–present

Major junctions
- South end: SR 25 in Carthage
- North end: SR 85 west of Defeated

Location
- Country: United States
- State: Tennessee
- Counties: Smith

Highway system
- Tennessee State Routes; Interstate; US; State
← SR 262	→ SR 264

State Route 263 (SR 263) is a short north–south highway in Smith County, Tennessee. The road begins in Carthage and ends west of Defeated. The current length is 5.0 mi (8.0 km).

== Route description ==
SR 263 begins at an intersection with SR 25 in Carthage. The highway goes northward over steep and rugged terrain as it passes by Cordell Hull Dam and Lake. After passing the dam, SR 263 passes an overlook of the lake and then winds north-northeastward to its northern terminus on SR 85.

== Major intersections ==
The entire route is in Smith County.

Location	mi	km	Destinations	Notes
Carthage	0.00	0.00	SR 25 (Dixon Springs Highway) – Hartsville, South Carthage	Southern terminus; road continues south as Main Street into downtown
	5.0	8.0	SR 85 (Defeated Creek Highway) – Pleasant Shade, Defeated, Gainesboro	Northern terminus
1.000 mi = 1.609 km; 1.000 km = 0.621 mi
