= Tennessee State Route 262 =

State highway in Tennessee, United States

State Route 262
- SR 262; primary in red, secondary in blue

Route information
- Maintained by TDOT
- Length: 24.6 mi (39.6 km)
- Existed: July 1, 1983–present

Major junctions
- West end: SR 52 in Lafayette
- SR 56 / SR 80 in Willette; SR 85 in rural Jackson County
- East end: SR 53 in Gainesboro

Location
- Country: United States
- State: Tennessee
- Counties: Macon, Jackson

Highway system
- Tennessee State Routes; Interstate; US; State
← SR 261	→ SR 263

State Route 262 (SR 262) is an east–west state highway in Middle Tennessee. it traverses Macon and Jackson counties.

== Route description ==
SR 262 begins in Macon County as a secondary highway at an intersection with SR 52 just east of Lafayette. It turns southeastward towards Willette crossing SR 56 and SR 80. It runs concurrently with SR 56 from Gidds Crossroads to near Goose Horn. SR 262 enters Jackson County close to the point where Macon and Jackson counties meet Smith County, but falls short of the Smith County line.

SR 262 continues southeastward, and then runs concurrently with SR 85 for a short distance from Highland to Rough Point. SR 262 then becomes a primary highway and goes southeast to cross the Cumberland River and end on the west side of Gainesboro at a junction with SR 53.

== History ==
Prior to 1982, SR 262 was designated SR 85A

== Major intersections ==
County	Location	mi	km	Destinations	Notes
Macon	Lafayette	0.0	0.0	SR 52 (Highway 52 East) – Lafayette, Red Boiling Springs	Western terminus; SR 262 begins as a secondary highway
Macon	Willette	7.5	12.1	SR 56 north / SR 80 south (Carthage Road) – Carthage, Pleasant Shade, Red Boiling Springs	Northern terminus of SR 80; western end of SR 56 concurrency
Macon	Willette	9.9	15.9	SR 56 south (Jennings Creek Road) – Whitleyville, Gainesboro	Eastern end of SR 56 concurrency
Jackson		17.7	28.5	SR 85 west (Gladdice Highway) – Carthage, Defeated	Western end of SR 85 concurrency
Jackson		20.7	33.3	SR 85 east – Whitleyville	Eastern end of SR 85 concurrency; SR 262 turns primary
Jackson		23.2	37.3	Bridge over Cumberland River	
Jackson	Gainesboro	24.6	39.6	SR 53 (Granville Highway/W Hull Avenue) – Granville, Downtown	Eastern terminus; SR 262 ends as a primary highway
1.000 mi = 1.609 km; 1.000 km = 0.621 mi: Concurrency terminus
