= Tennessee State Route 164 =

State highway in Tennessee, United States

State Route 164
- Hanging Limb Highway
- SR 164 highlighted in red

Route information
- Maintained by TDOT
- Length: 16.4 mi (26.4 km)

Major junctions
- South end: US 70N in Monterey
- SR 62 in Monterey
- North end: SR 85 in Crawford

Location
- Country: United States
- State: Tennessee
- Counties: Putnam, Overton

Highway system
- Tennessee State Routes; Interstate; US; State
← SR 163	→ SR 165

State Route 164 (SR 164) is a north–south state highway in the Cumberland Plateau region of eastern Middle Tennessee. For the majority of its length, it is known as Hanging Limb Highway.

== Route description ==
SR 164 begins in Putnam County in Monterey at an intersection with US 70N/SR 24. It goes northeast as S Chestnut Street past a mix of homes and businesses to have an intersection with SR 62. The highway continues northeast onto N Chestnut Street past more homes and before leaving Monterey and crossing into Overton County. SR 164 goes east through farmland as Hanging Limb Highway before entering mountains and winding its way north to the community of Hanging Limb. It passes through the community before winding its way north to the Crawford community, where it comes to an end at an intersection with SR 85. The entire route of SR 164 is a two-lane highway.

== Major intersections ==
County	Location	mi	km	Destinations	Notes
Putnam	Monterey	0.0	0.0	US 70N (E Stratton Avenue/SR 24) to I-40 – Cookeville, Crossville	Southern terminus
Putnam	Monterey	0.3	0.48	SR 62 (E Commercial Avenue) to SR 84 – Clarkrange, Jamestown	
Overton	Crawford	16.4	26.4	SR 85 (Wilder Highway) – Livingston, Grimsley, Jamestown	Northern terminus
1.000 mi = 1.609 km; 1.000 km = 0.621 mi
