= Tennessee State Route 293 =

State highway in Tennessee, United States

State Route 293
- SR 293 highlighted in red

Route information
- Maintained by TDOT
- Length: 11.2 mi (18.0 km)
- Existed: July 1, 1983–present

Major junctions
- West end: SR 136 near Bangham
- SR 111 in Rickman
- East end: SR 84 near Livingston

Location
- Country: United States
- State: Tennessee
- Counties: Putnam, Overton

Highway system
- Tennessee State Routes; Interstate; US; State
← SR 292	→ SR 294

State Route 293 (SR 293) is a 11.2-mile-long (18.0 km) east-west state highway that, excluding its western terminus, is located entirely in Overton County, Tennessee.

== Route description ==
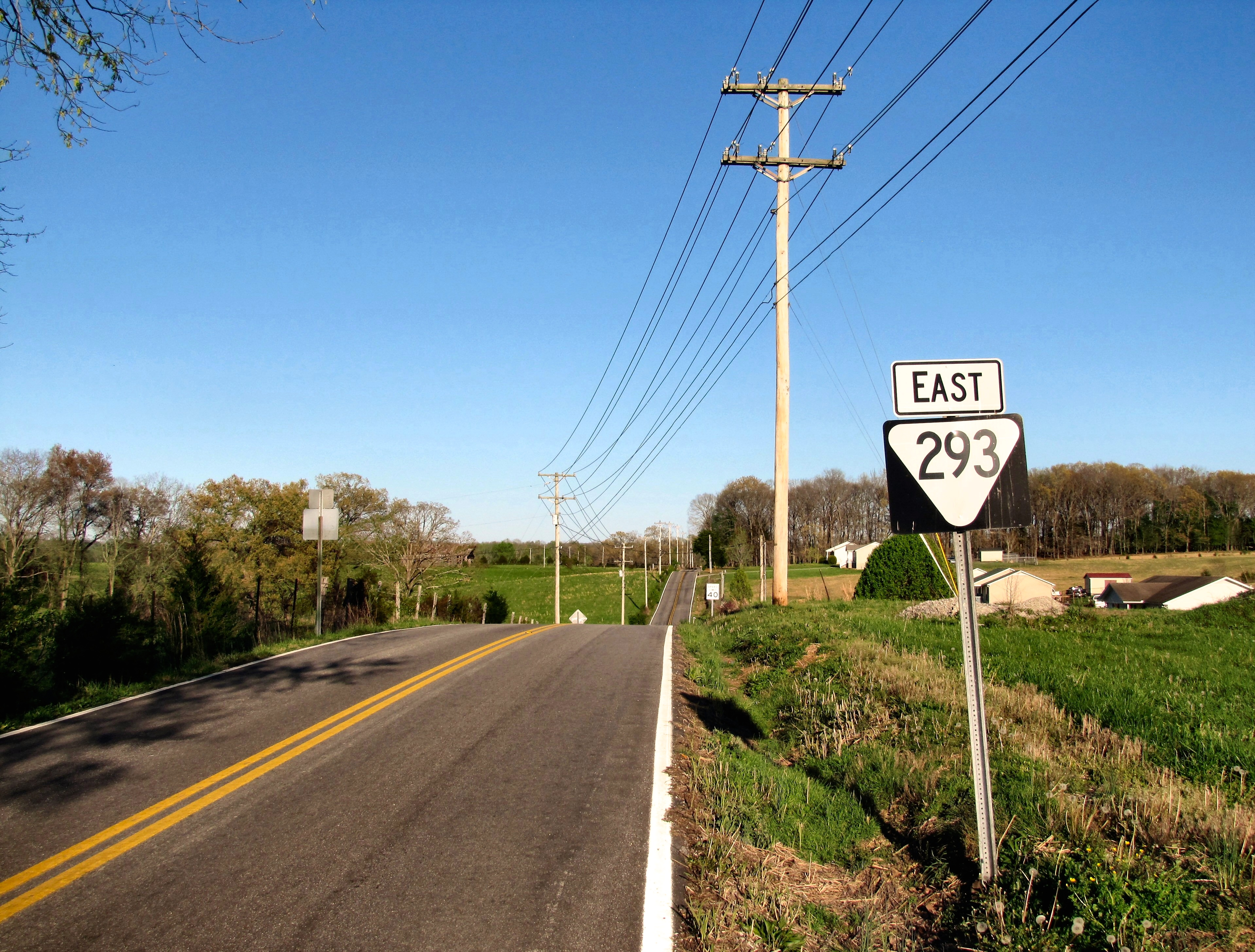
Tennessee State Route 293 (Tommy Dodson Highway) at its western end in northern Putnam County, Tennessee, United States.

SR 293 begins on the Overton-Putnam county line at an intersection with SR 136 north of Bangham. It heads east, in Overton County, along Tommy Dodson Highway (as it is signed in the field) though rural farmland for several miles to enter Rickman and come to an intersection with SR 111. SR 293 turns south along a short concurrency with SR 111 before turning southeast along Rickman Monterey Highway to pass through downtown, where it has an intersection with former SR 42. The highway then leaves Rickman and winds its way through farmland and rural areas for the next several miles before coming to an end at an intersection with SR 84. The entire route of SR 293 is a rural two-lane highway.

== Major intersections ==
County	Location	mi	km	Destinations	Notes
Putnam–Overton county line		0.0	0.0	SR 136 (Hilham Road) – Cookeville, Hilham	Western terminus
Overton	Rickman	4.5	7.2	SR 111 north (Cookeville Highway) – Livingston	Western end of SR 111 concurrency
Overton	Rickman	4.8	7.7	SR 111 south (Cookeville Highway) – Algood, Cookeville	Eastern end of SR 111 concurrency
Overton	Rickman	5.8	9.3	Rickman Road - Livingston, Algood	Former SR 42
Overton		11.2	18.0	SR 84 – Livingston, Monterey	Eastern terminus
1.000 mi = 1.609 km; 1.000 km = 0.621 mi: Concurrency terminus
