= Difficult, Tennessee =

- Unincorporated community
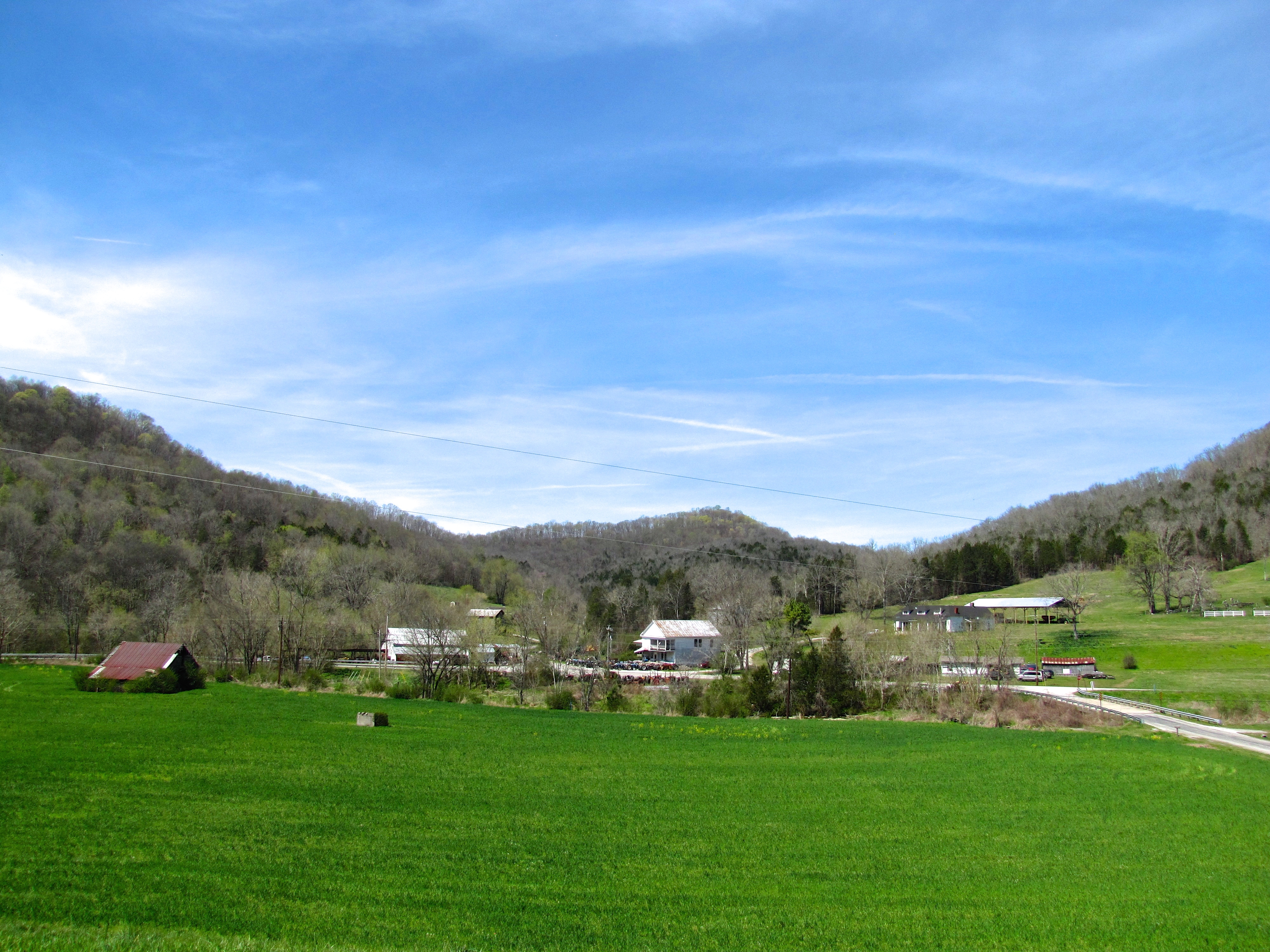
- Buildings and houses in Difficult

- Location within Tennessee Location within the United States
- Coordinates: 36°22′09″N 85°53′32″W
- Country: United States
- State: Tennessee
- County: Smith
- Elevation: 538 ft (164 m)
- Time zone: UTC-6 (Central (CST))
  - Summer (DST): UTC-5 (CDT)
- ZIP code: 37145
- Area code: 615
- GNIS feature ID: 1306346

Difficult is an unincorporated community in Smith County, Tennessee, in the United States. It lies just north of State Route 85, about halfway between Defeated to the south and Kempville to the east. Defeated Creek, a tributary of the Cumberland River, passes through the community.

== History ==
One version of the name's origin holds that when residents applied for a post office, the application was returned because the preferred name was "too difficult".
