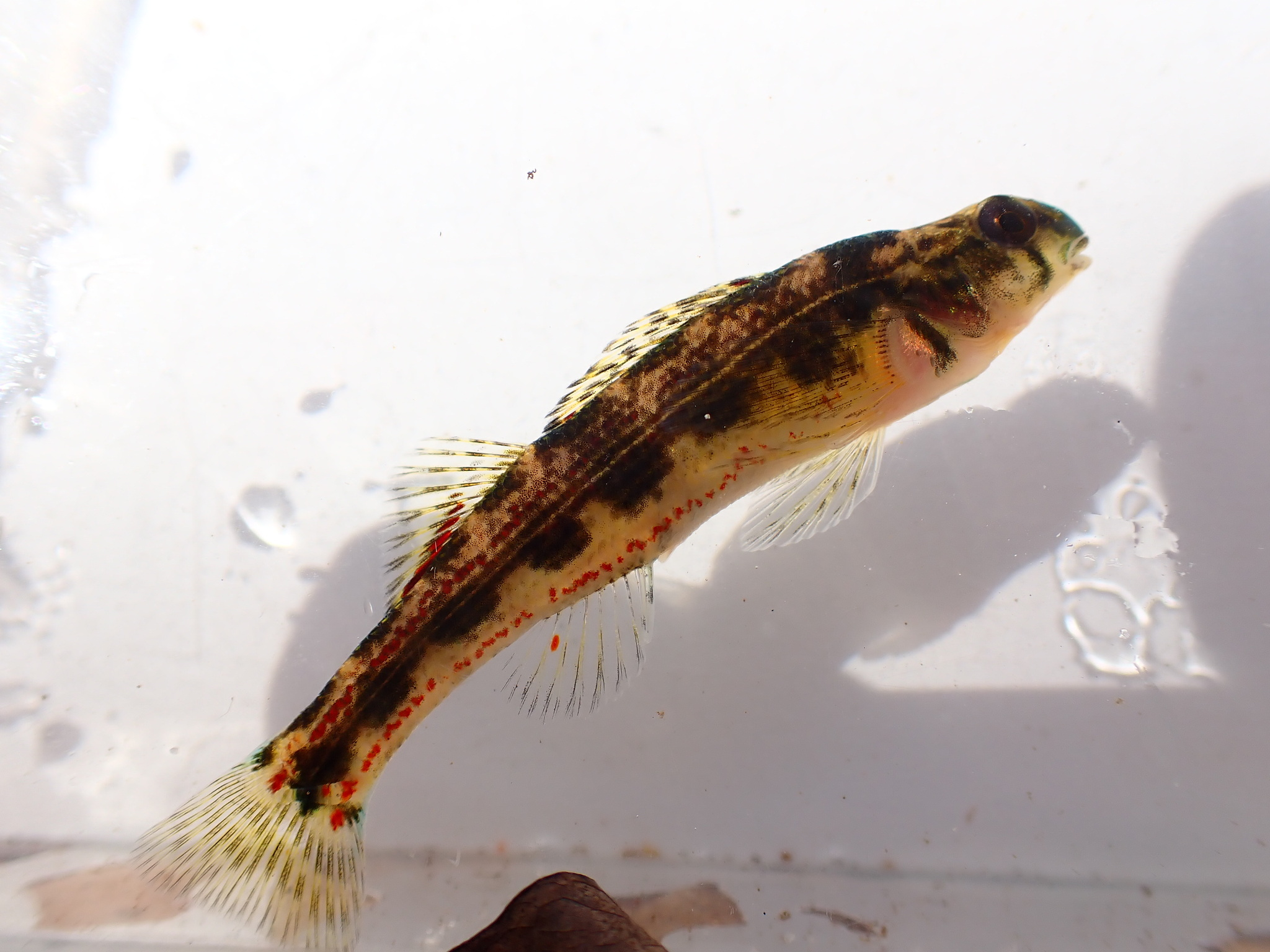

Conservation status
- Least Concern (IUCN 3.1)

Scientific classification
- Kingdom: Animalia
- Phylum: Chordata
- Class: Actinopterygii
- Order: Perciformes
- Family: Percidae
- Genus: Etheostoma
- Species: E. etnieri

Binomial name
- Etheostoma etnieri Bouchard, 1977

= Cherry darter =

Species of fish

The cherry darter (Etheostoma etnieri) is a species of freshwater ray-finned fish, a darter from the subfamily Etheostomatinae, part of the family Percidae, which also contains the perches, ruffes and pikeperches. It is endemic to the upper Caney Fork system of the Cumberland River drainage in the U.S. state of Tennessee.

== Appearance and anatomy ==
The largest males have a standard length of 64 mm (2.5 in) and the largest females 55 mm (2.2 in).

== Distribution ==
The cherry darter is endemic to the upper Caney Fork system of the Cumberland River drainage, central Tennessee. The species is limited to streams flowing over limestones of the Mississippian Eastern Highland Rim. They do not occur in cool, slightly acidic headwaters or in the lower portion of Caney Fork River system. The range includes White, Putnam, Warren, Van Buren, and Grundy Counties.

== Ecology ==
Cherry darters feed primarily on aquatic invertebrates and insects, and are known to inhabit a wide range of habitats from springs and small creeks to large rivers. This species has a preference for small- to medium-sized creeks or streams and is usually collected in riffles and runs of moderate to low turbulence, especially over a gravel substrate. In larger streams and rivers, the species is typically found along the margins.

== Life history ==
Cherry darter spawning peaks in April and early May, and they reach sexual maturity at the age of two. The cherry darter has not been studied extensively, so little else is known of its life history.

== Status ==
Currently, no management plan is in place for this species. The Tennessee Wildlife Resources Agency evaluated the cherry darter in 2001 and deemed it stable and not a great conservation need for the agency. Although this fish is present only within a restricted range, it is common in some parts of that range and no evidence indicates populations in general are dwindling or it is in immediate danger of extinction. For these reasons, the IUCN lists this species as being of "Least Concern". The major potential threat is habitat degradation due to chemical runoff from agriculture, siltation, and in some cases effluent from mining.

== Taxonomy and etymology ==
The cherry darter was first formally described in 1977 by Raymond William Bouchard with the type locality given as Cherry Creek at Tennessee State Route 84, this is a tributary to the Calfkiller River, part of the Caney Fork River system in Tennessee. The specific name honours the American biologist David Etnier.
