= Tennessee State Route 85 =

State highway in Tennessee, United States

State Route 85
- SR 85; primary in red, secondary in blue

Route information
- Maintained by TDOT
- Length: 83.4 mi (134.2 km)
- Tourist routes: Cumberland Historic Byway

Major junctions
- West end: SR 80 near Monoville
- SR 53 / SR 56 / SR 135 near Gainesboro; SR 111 in Livingston; SR 84 in Livingston; SR 52 in Livingston
- East end: US 127 near Grimsley

Location
- Country: United States
- State: Tennessee
- Counties: Smith, Jackson, Overton, Fentress

Highway system
- Tennessee State Routes; Interstate; US; State
← SR 84	→ SR 86

State Route 85 (SR 85) is an east–west state highway in Middle Tennessee. The 83.4-mile-long (134.2 km) road traverses portions of Smith, Jackson, Overton, and Fentress Counties.

== Route description ==
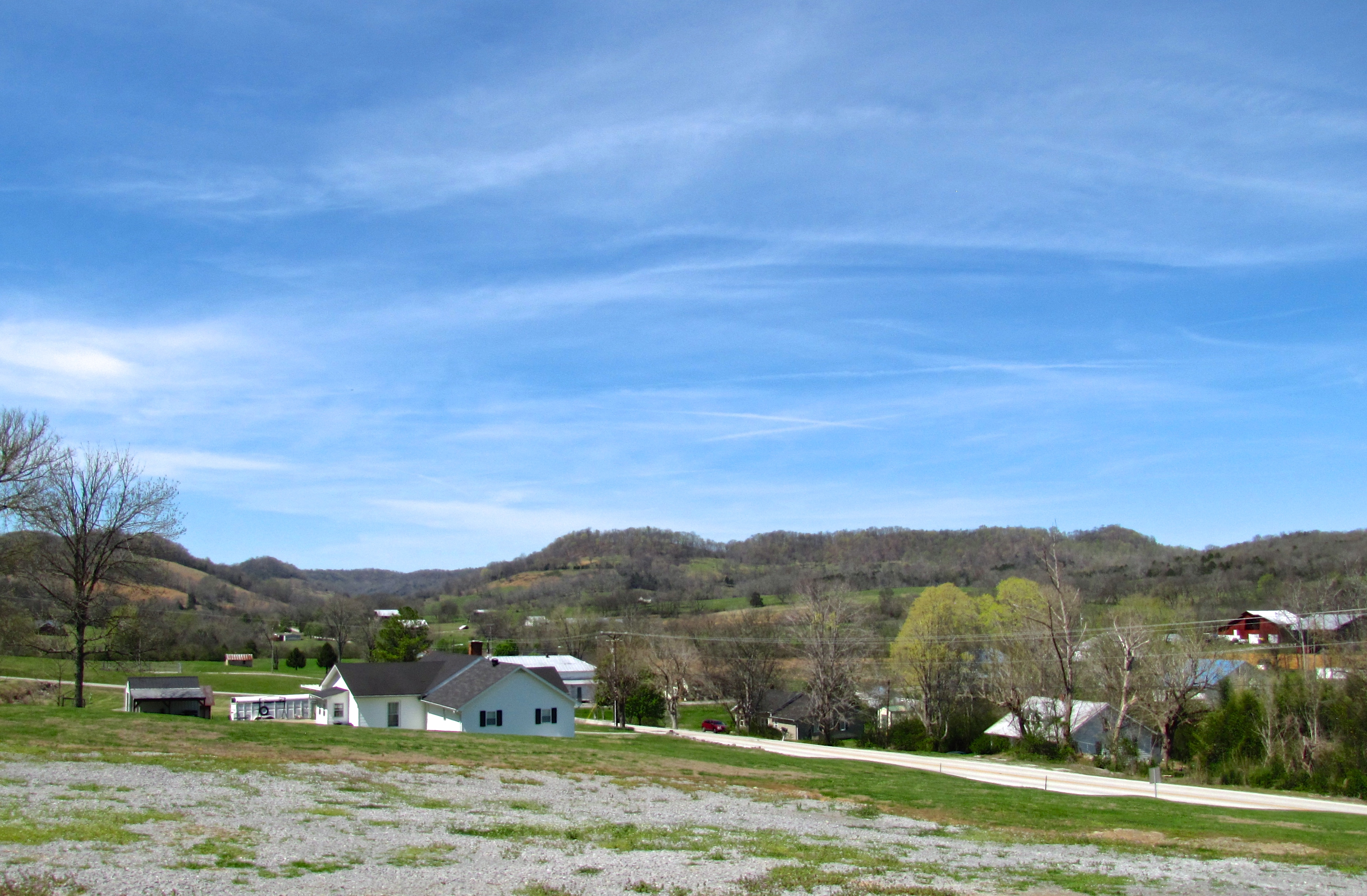
SR 85 passing through the Smith County community of Kempville

SR 85 begins in Smith County in Monoville at a junction with SR 80. It goes east as a primary highway to an intersection with SR 263 before passing by Cordell Hull Lake/Cumberland River. It then passes through Defeated and travels along Defeated Creek for a short distance before turning east again and passing through Kempville.

SR 85 then enters Jackson County and passes by the historic home of Sampson Williams. It then climbs a few mountains before coming to a junction and becomes concurrent with SR 262 at a crossing of an arm of Cordell Hull Lake. They then parallel the Cumberland River until SR 85 separates from SR 262 and turns north. SR 85 then becomes a very curvy secondary highway and turns northeast as it climbs through some more mountains for several miles. It then intersects SR 56/SR 135 in Jennings Creek and joins their concurrency, becoming primary once again. They then turn south and pass by Jackson County Middle School before crossing the Cumberland River again and intersecting with SR 53 just north of Gainesboro. SR 56 turns south along SR 53 while SR 85 and SR 135 turn north along SR 53. The three travel along the banks of the Cumberland River before they all split at a W-shaped intersection, with SR 53 turning north along the Cumberland, SR 135 goes southeast, and SR 85 east, leaving the Cumberland River for the final time. SR 85 then goes through some more mountains before passing through Burristown and some farmland. It then becomes curvy again and crosses into Overton County.

It then enters Hillham and intersects SR 136. SR 85 then curves to the southeast and leaves Hilham, passing by Hilham School. It the continues east to intersect SR 84 before entering Livingston. It then intersects and becomes concurrent with SR 111 for a short distance before entering downtown. In downtown, SR 85 intersects and becomes concurrent with SR 52. They then leave downtown and intersect SR 294 before leaving Livingston. SR 52/SR 85 then become curvy and pass through Alpine. SR 52 then separates and turns north, while SR 85 turns south, becoming secondary once again. It then passes through Allred it then becomes extremely curvy and climbs a very large mountain to junction with SR 164 north of Crawford. It stays curvy for several more miles to pass through Twinton, where it meets Craventown Road, then passing through the Wilder community just to the north, before the road crosses into Fentress County.

SR 85 then goes through Davidson (where it passes by the Wilder post office) and some hairpin turns before the road finally straightens out as it enters farmland, coming to an end shortly thereafter at US 127/SR 28 between Clarkrange and Grimsley beside South Fentress Elementary School.

== Major intersections ==
County	Location	mi	km	Destinations	Notes
Smith	Monoville	0.00	0.00	SR 80 (Pleasant Shade Highway) – Carthage, Pleasant Shade, Red Boiling Springs	Western terminus; begins as a primary highway
Smith		1.6	2.6	SR 263 south (Turkey Creek Road) – Carthage	Northern terminus of SR 263
Jackson		13.1	21.1	SR 262 west (Wartrace Highway) – Lafayette	Western end of SR 262 concurrency
Jackson		16.2	26.1	SR 262 east (Gladdice Highway) – Gainesboro	Eastern end of SR 262 concurrency; SR 85 becomes secondary route
Jackson		24.7	39.8	SR 56 north / SR 135 north (Jennings Creek Highway) – Whitleyville, Red Boiling Springs	Western end of concurrency with SR 56 and SR 135
Jackson		28.4	45.7	Gainesboro bridge over Cumberland River	
Jackson	Gainesboro	28.6	46.0	SR 53 south / SR 56 south (Grundy Quarles Highway) – Downtown, Granville, Baxter	Eastern end of SR 56 concurrency; Western end of SR 53 concurrency; SR 85 becomes a primary route
Jackson	Gainesboro	28.8	46.3	SR 135 south (Dodson Branch Highway) – Cummins Falls State Park, Cookeville	Eastern end of SR 135 concurrency
Jackson	Gainesboro	29.4	47.3	SR 53 north (Grundy Quarles Highway) – Celina	Eastern end of SR 53 concurrency
Overton	Hilham	42.8	68.9	SR 136 (Standing Stone Highway/Standing Stone Park Highway) – Cookeville, Standing Stone State Park	
Overton		48.8	78.5	SR 84 south (Rickman Monterey Highway) – Monterey	Northern terminus of SR 84
Overton	Livingston	49.9	80.3	SR 111 south (W Main Street) – Cookeville	Western end of SR 111 concurrency
Overton	Livingston	50.2	80.8	SR 111 north (Bradford Hicks Drive) – Byrdstown, Standing Stone State Park	Eastern end of SR 111 concurrency
Overton	Livingston	50.9	81.9	SR 52 west (N Church Street) – Standing Stone State Park, Celina	Western end of SR 52 concurrency
Overton	Livingston	52.0	83.7	SR 294 north (E Main Street) to SR 111 – Byrdstown, Dale Hollow Lake	Southern terminus of SR 294
Overton	Alpine	60.1	96.7	SR 52 east (Jamestown Highway) – Jamestown, Pickett State Park	Eastern end of SR 52 concurrency; SR 85 becomes a secondary route
Overton	Crawford	70.4	113.3	SR 164 south (Hanging Limb Highway) – Monterey	Northern terminus of SR 164
Fentress	Grimsley	83.4	134.2	US 127 (SR 28/Alvin C. York Highway) – Jamestown, Crossville	Eastern terminus; SR 85 ends as a secondary highway
1.000 mi = 1.609 km; 1.000 km = 0.621 mi: Concurrency terminus
