= Tennessee State Route 80 =

State highway in Tennessee, United States

State Route 80
- Pleasant Shade Highway
- SR 80 highlighted in red

Route information
- Maintained by TDOT
- Length: 13.8 mi (22.2 km)

Major junctions
- South end: SR 25 west of Carthage
- SR 85 near Monoville
- North end: SR 56 / SR 262 in Red Boiling Springs

Location
- Country: United States
- State: Tennessee
- Counties: Smith, Macon

Highway system
- Tennessee State Routes; Interstate; US; State
| ← SR 79 | → I-81 |

State Route 80 (SR 80) is a north–south state highway in Middle Tennessee. The 13.8-mile-long (22.2 km) road traverses portions of Smith and Macon Counties.

== Route description ==
SR 80 begins in Smith County just west Carthage at an intersection with SR 25 on the banks of the Cumberland River. It then goes north as a 2-lane country road, having an intersection with SR 85, about two miles (3.2 km) west of Defeated, just after passing through Monoville. It then passes through some rolling hills and farmland before passing through Pleasant Shade. It then crosses into Macon County shortly afterwards. It then winds through some more hills before having an intersection with Defeated Creek Road, a back road to Defeated. SR 80 then ends at a 4-way stop intersection with SR 56 and SR 262 in Willette.

== Major intersections ==
| County | Location | mi | km | Destinations | Notes |
|---|---|---|---|---|---|
| Smith | | 0.0 | 0.0 | SR 25 (Dixon Springs Highway) – Carthage, Hartsville | Southern terminus |
| Smith | Monoville | 2.5 | 4.0 | SR 85 east (Defeated Creek Highway) – Defeated Creek, Salt Lick Creek | Western terminus of SR 85 |
| Macon | Red Boiling Springs | 13.8 | 22.2 | SR 56 / SR 262 (Union Camp Road/Carthage Road/Willette Road) – Lafayette, Red Boiling Springs, Willette | Northern terminus |
1.000 mi = 1.609 km; 1.000 km = 0.621 mi
