= Tennessee State Route 294 =

State highway in Tennessee, United States

State Route 294
- Willow Grove Highway
- SR 294 highlighted in red

Route information
- Maintained by TDOT
- Length: 20.0 mi (32.2 km)
- Existed: July 1, 1983–present
- Tourist routes: Cumberland Historic Byway

Major junctions
- South end: SR 52 / SR 85 in Livingston
- SR 111 from Livingston to near Monroe
- North end: Willow Grove Resort at Dale Hollow Lake

Location
- Country: United States
- State: Tennessee
- Counties: Overton, Clay

Highway system
- Tennessee State Routes; Interstate; US; State
← SR 293	→ SR 295

State Route 294 (SR 294) is a north–south secondary state highway in eastern Middle Tennessee.

== Route description ==
SR 294 begins on the east side of Livingston, in Overton County. It runs concurrently with SR 111 from the city limits to just short of Monroe, where SR 294 turns onto Willow Grove Highway. SR 294's northern terminus is located outside of the parking lot of the Willow Grove Resort, a lodging establishment along the shores of Dale Hollow Lake. This is located in the one area of dry land in Clay County that can only be accessed from Overton County.

== Major intersections ==
County	Location	mi	km	Destinations	Notes
Overton	Livingston	0.0	0.0	SR 52 / SR 85 – Jamestown, Livingston Business District	Southern terminus
Overton	Livingston	0.5	0.80	SR 111 south – Cookeville	Southern end of SR 111 overlap
Overton	Monroe	4.1	6.6	SR 111 north – Byrdstown	Northern end of SR 111 overlap
Clay	Willow Grove	20.0	32.2	Willow Grove Resort	Northern terminus
1.000 mi = 1.609 km; 1.000 km = 0.621 mi
