= Difficulty =

Difficulty or Difficult may refer to:

- A problem
- Degree of difficulty, in sport and gaming
- Counter-majoritarian difficulty, in legal theory
- Difficult, Tennessee, a community in the United States
- "Difficult" (Uffie song)
- "Difficult" (Eminem song)
- Hill Difficulty, a fictional place in the 1678 Christian allegory The Pilgrim's Progress
