= Stonewall, Tennessee =

- Unincorporated community
- Location within Tennessee Location within the United States
- Coordinates: 36°11′25″N 85°53′56″W
- Country: United States
- State: Tennessee
- County: Smith
- Elevation: 505 ft (154 m)
- Time zone: UTC-6 (Central (CST))
  - Summer (DST): UTC-5 (CDT)
- GNIS feature ID: 1271509

Stonewall is an unincorporated community in Smith County, Tennessee, United States.

Settled in 1826, the population was 60 in 1876.
