= Shady Grove, Putnam County, Tennessee =

Shady Grove, Tennessee
- Unincorporated community
- Location within Tennessee Location within the United States
- Coordinates: 36°11′25″N 85°19′20″W
- Country: United States
- State: Tennessee
- County: Putnam
- Elevation: 1,371 ft (418 m)
- Time zone: UTC-6 (Central (CST))
  - Summer (DST): UTC-5 (CDT)
- Area code: 931
- GNIS feature ID: 1310994

Shady Grove is an unincorporated community in Putnam County, Tennessee, United States. Shady Grove is 10.2 miles (16.4 km) east-northeast of Cookeville.
