= Kempville, Tennessee =

- Unincorporated community
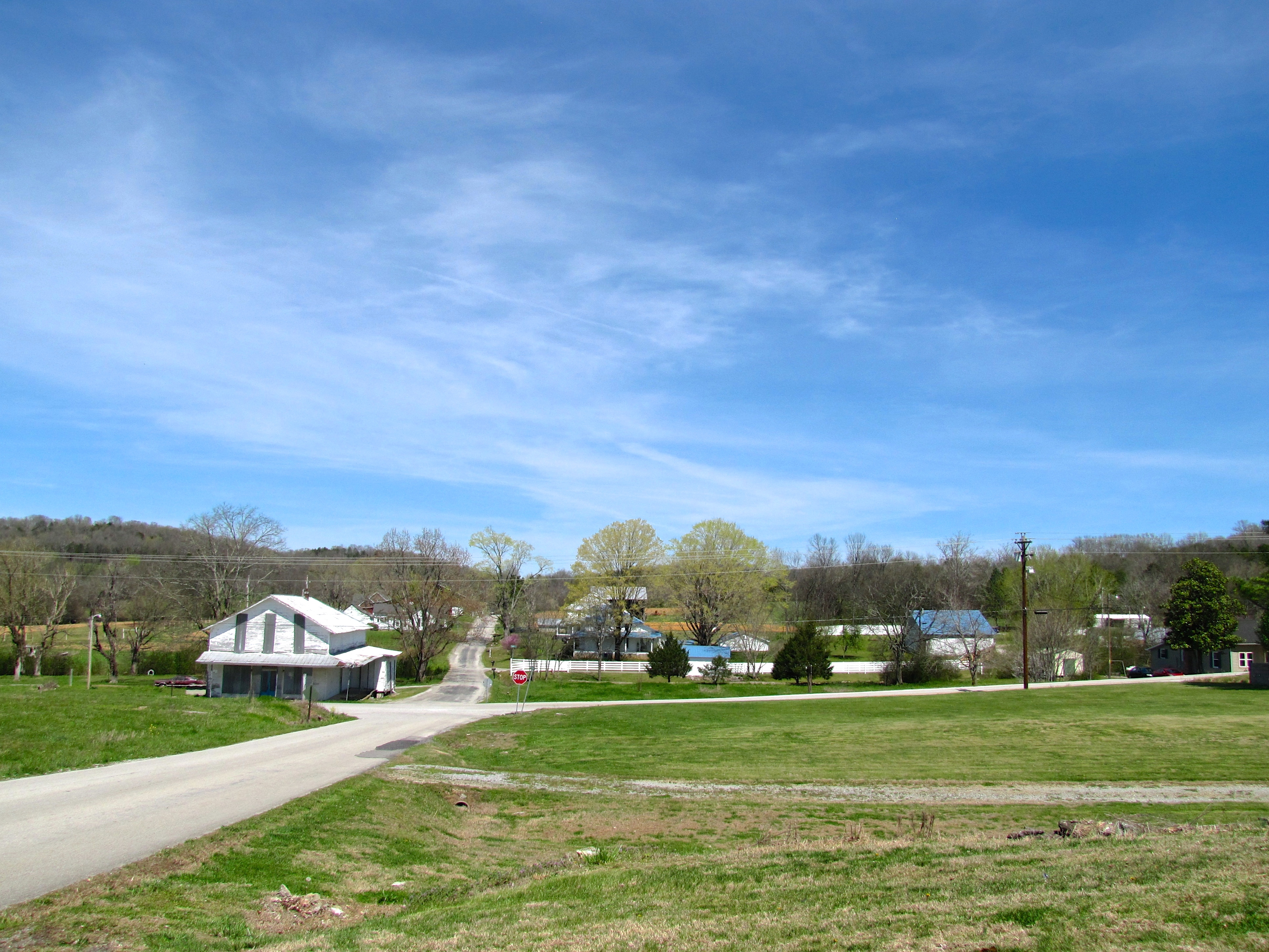
- Houses in Kempville

- Location within Tennessee Location within the United States
- Coordinates: 36°20′48″N 85°51′47″W
- Country: United States
- State: Tennessee
- County: Smith
- Elevation: 623 ft (190 m)
- Time zone: UTC-6 (Central (CST))
  - Summer (DST): UTC-5 (CDT)
- ZIP codes: 37030, 37145
- Area code: 615
- GNIS feature ID: 1290057

Kempville is an unincorporated community in Smith County, Tennessee, United States. It is located along State Route 85 in a hilly area northeast of Carthage. Kempville Branch, a tributary of Defeated Creek, flows through the community.

Kempville was probably named for a family of early settlers in the area.
