= Chestnut Mound, Tennessee =

- Unincorporated community
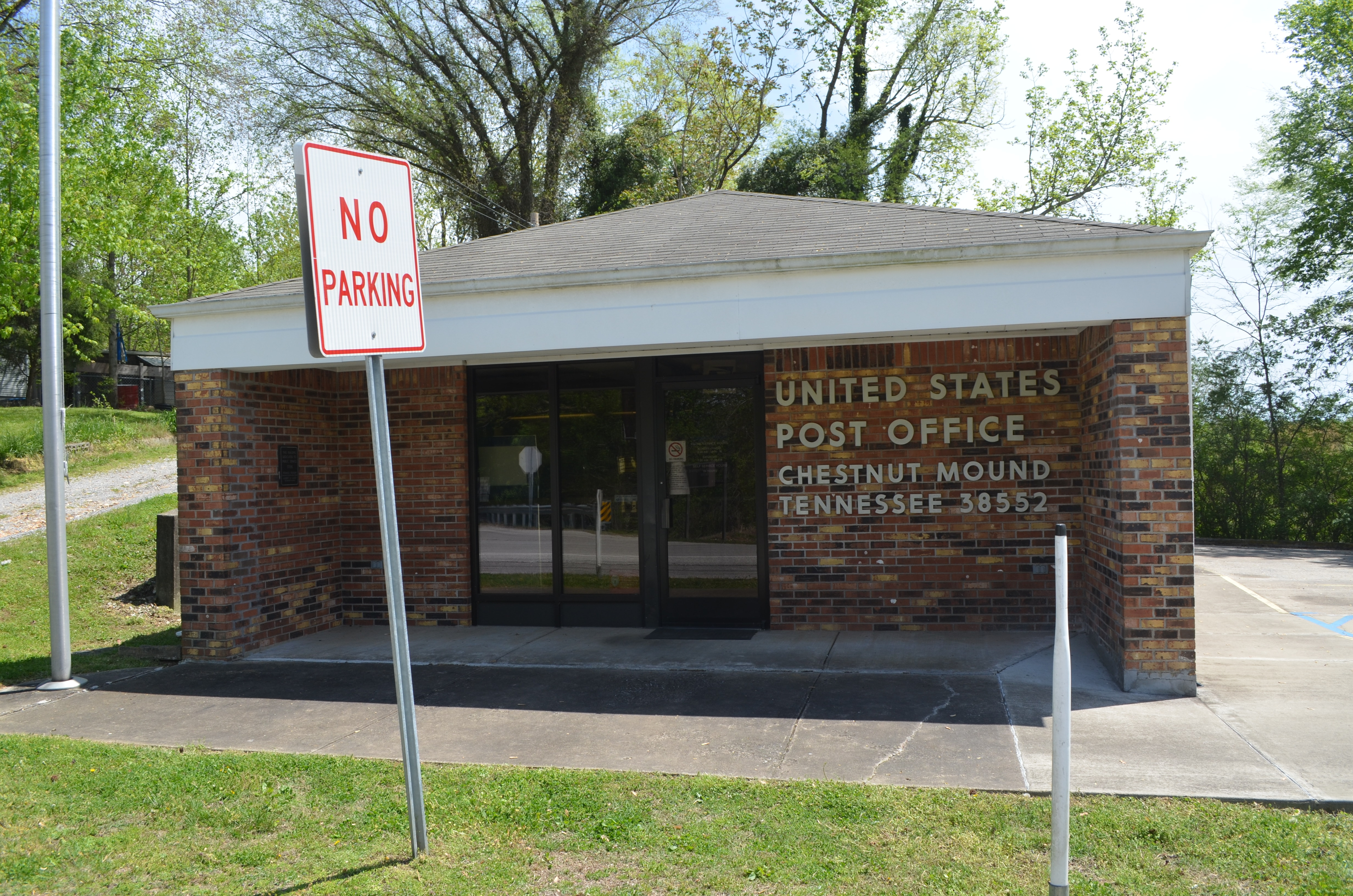
- US Post office in Chestnut Mound

- Location within Tennessee Location within the United States
- Coordinates: 36°12′10″N 85°49′35″W
- Country: United States
- State: Tennessee
- County: Smith
- Elevation: 971 ft (296 m)
- Time zone: UTC-6 (Central (CST))
  - Summer (DST): UTC-5 (CDT)
- ZIP code: 38552
- Area code: 615
- GNIS feature ID: 1280398

Chestnut Mound is an unincorporated community in Smith County, United States. Its ZIP code is 38552.

== Climate ==
Chestnut Mound's climate is four-season subtropical (Cfa) under Köppen (oceanic Do under Trewartha, but nearly Cf), typical of Tennessee. Chestnut Mound lies in USDA Hardiness Zone 7a, so the coldest night of the year typically drops to 0 to 5 degrees Fahrenheit (-18 to -15 degrees Celsius).

Climate data for Chestnut Mound
Month	Jan	Feb	Mar	Apr	May	Jun	Jul	Aug	Sep	Oct	Nov	Dec	Year
Mean daily maximum °F (°C)	46.5 (8.1)	51.1 (10.6)	60.4 (15.8)	69.9 (21.1)	77.6 (25.3)	85.2 (29.6)	88.4 (31.3)	87.9 (31.1)	81.9 (27.7)	71.5 (21.9)	61.3 (16.3)	49.6 (9.8)	69.3 (20.7)
Daily mean °F (°C)	36.75 (2.64)	40.30 (4.61)	48.45 (9.14)	57.15 (13.97)	65.80 (18.78)	74.25 (23.47)	77.90 (25.50)	76.85 (24.92)	70.20 (21.22)	59.00 (15.00)	49.85 (9.92)	39.65 (4.25)	58.05 (14.47)
Mean daily minimum °F (°C)	27.0 (−2.8)	29.5 (−1.4)	36.5 (2.5)	44.4 (6.9)	54.0 (12.2)	63.3 (17.4)	67.4 (19.7)	65.8 (18.8)	58.5 (14.7)	46.5 (8.1)	38.4 (3.6)	29.7 (−1.3)	46.8 (8.2)
Average precipitation inches (mm)	4.4 (110)	4.5 (110)	4.7 (120)	4.1 (100)	5.4 (140)	4.5 (110)	4.9 (120)	3.8 (97)	3.7 (94)	3.2 (81)	4.4 (110)	5.4 (140)	53 (1,332)
Average snowfall inches (cm)	2.0 (5.1)	1.4 (3.6)	0.4 (1.0)	0 (0)	0 (0)	0 (0)	0 (0)	0 (0)	0 (0)	0 (0)	0 (0)	0.5 (1.3)	4.3 (11)
Source: "Climate in Chestnut Mound, Tennessee". BestPlaces. BestPlaces.
