= Willow Grove, Tennessee =

Town in Clay County, Tennessee, United States

Willow Grove
- Town
- Location within Tennessee Location within the United States
- Coordinates: 36°35′13″N 85°20′32″W
- Country: United States
- State: Tennessee
- County: Clay County
- Settled: before 1785
- Vacated: 1942
- Elevation: 211 m (692 ft)
- Time zone: UTC-6 (Central (CST))
  - Summer (DST): UTC-5 (CDT)
- Area code: 931
- GNIS feature ID: 1314516

Willow Grove was a small town in eastern Clay County, Tennessee, United States. Named for the willow trees in the area, the town was located 13 miles (21 km) due east of Celina. It was located along the banks of Iron Creek, a tributary of the Obey River.

== History ==
The town was a settlement founded by five families from New York State. The land was purchased from Cherokee Indians at sometime prior to 1785.

In the 1920s and 1930s, Willow Grove was Clay County's second largest town, behind only the county seat, Celina. It was a thriving village complete with a gristmill, a school, a few churches, and a couple of businesses. The town stood on what was the area's most valuable agricultural land at the time.

In 1942, the U.S. Army Corps of Engineers bought the land in which the town was located in, thereby forcing its residents to relocate out of the area prior to the demolition of homes and other buildings as part of the impoundment of the area. On July 18 of that year, residents of the town marked a farewell celebration by holding a community picnic on the school grounds.

Following the completion of Dale Hollow Dam in 1943, the town site was completely submerged by water following the impounding of the river, which created Dale Hollow Reservoir. However, in 2008, a former employee of Kentucky's Trooper Island took an aerial photo of the school building's foundation on the bottom of the lake. The photo went viral on the Dale Hollow Lake Facebook page when a lake employee published it in 2016.

Former residents of Willow Grove meet annually on Labor Day weekend in remembrance of the town.

The formation of the lake left parts of eastern Clay County completely cut off from the rest of the county; traveling through neighboring Overton County and the Livingston area is necessary for commuting to Celina. Any parts of the community that were not submerged by water, have mostly become part of the Dale Hollow Lake Wildlife Management Area, which surrounds the lake.

== Geography ==
Until the creation of the lake, Tennessee State Route 53 (SR 53) was the major thoroughfare through the town, connection the area to Celina in the west and a direct connection east to SR 42 (now SR 111) in Byrdstown, in Pickett County. Another road led traffic northward to the part of Cumberland County, Kentucky, where Dale Hollow Lake State Park is presently located, and eventually to Burkesville via Kentucky Route 61 (KY 61). After the dam was completed, SR 53 was rerouted to directly connect with KY 61 (also partially rerouted due to the formation of the lake) at the state line south of Peytonsburg, Kentucky. The remnants of the original SR 53's alignment in western Pickett County is now SR 325 west of Byrdstown.

Today, any remaining parts of the area where the community stood that is not submerged by the lake is accessible via SR 294, which is the sole thoroughfare that connects with the Livingston area to provide access to the Willow Grove Marina and Resort.

== Notable residents ==
- Arthur Hollis Edens, 4th president of Duke University, was born in Willow Grove
- Cordell Hull, a former U.S. Secretary of State, attended school in Willow Grove before moving to Celina

== Bibliography ==
- Shell, Darren; Shell, Sheryl (2015). The History of Dale Hollow Lake. Martinsville, Indiana: Fideli Publishing, Inc. ISBN 978-1604140972.
