= Tennessee State Route 84 =

State highway in Tennessee, United States

State Route 84
- SR 84; primary in red, secondary in blue

Route information
- Maintained by TDOT
- Length: 40.44 mi (65.08 km)

Major junctions
- West end: US 70 in Sparta
- US 70N in Monterey; I-40 in Monterey; SR 111 in Livingston
- East end: SR 85 in Livingston

Location
- Country: United States
- State: Tennessee
- Counties: White, Putnam, Overton

Highway system
- Tennessee State Routes; Interstate; US; State
← SR 83	→ SR 85

State Route 84 (SR 84) is a north–south state highway in eastern Middle Tennessee. It originates at Sparta on U.S. Route 70 (US 70), goes through the town of Monterey, and ends on the west side of Livingston along SR 85.

== Route description ==
=== White County ===
SR 84 begins as a secondary highway in downtown Sparta, in White County, at a junction with US 70/SR 1. It then follows a northeasterly path to through some rural farmland before entering some mountains and crossing into Putnam County.

=== Putnam County ===
SR 84 then becomes very curvy before it intersects and becomes concurrent with US 70N/SR 24, where it becomes a primary highway, and enters Monterey.

US 70N/SR 84/SR 24 then intersect I-40 (Exit 300) before entering downtown Monterey. In downtown, US 70N/SR 24 split off and turn south, while SR 84 continues to an intersection with SR 62, where it makes a sharp left turn and goes northeast, leaving Monterey.

=== Overton County ===
SR 84 then becomes curvy as it enters Overton County to intersect with SR 293. It then continues northwest through mountainous terrain and farmland before entering Livingston. SR 84 has an overpass interchange with SR 111 before coming to an end on the west side of Livingston at a junction with SR 85. A former alignment saw the last one mile (1.6 km) of SR 84 routed slightly farther north to a terminus at SR 111 approximately one-half mile (0.80 km) north of the current SR 84/SR 111 interchange.

== Major intersections ==
County	Location	mi	km	Destinations	Notes
White	Sparta	0.0	0.0	US 70 (SR 1/Bockman Way) – Crossville, Smithville	Southern terminus; SR 84 begins as a secondary highway
Putnam		20.6	33.2	US 70N west (SR 24/Monterey Highway) – Cookeville	Western end of US 70N/SR 24 overlap; SR 84 turns primary
Putnam	Monterey	21.7	34.9	I-40 – Nashville, Knoxville	I-40 exit 300
Putnam	Monterey	22.1	35.6	US 70N east (SR 24/Stratton Avenue) to I-40 – Crossville	Eastern end of US 70N/SR 24 overlap
Putnam	Monterey	22.4	36.0	SR 62 east (East Commercial Avenue) – Clarkrange	Western terminus of SR 62
Overton		29.2	47.0	SR 293 west – Rickman	Eastern terminus of SR 293
Overton	Livingston	39.2	63.1	SR 111 (Cookeville Highway) – Cookeville, Livingston	Interchange
Overton	Livingston	40.5	65.2	SR 85 (Hilham Highway) – Gainesboro, Livingston, Standing Stone State Park	Northern terminus; SR 84 ends as a primary highway
1.000 mi = 1.609 km; 1.000 km = 0.621 mi: Concurrency terminus
