= Grandview, Putnam County, Tennessee =

Grandview, Tennessee
- Unincorporated community
- Location within Tennessee Location within the United States
- Coordinates: 36°12′40″N 85°28′44″W
- Country: United States
- State: Tennessee
- County: Putnam
- Elevation: 1,142 ft (348 m)
- Time zone: UTC-6 (Central (CST))
  - Summer (DST): UTC-5 (CDT)
- Area code: 931
- GNIS feature ID: 1310909

Grandview is an unincorporated community in Putnam County, Tennessee, United States. Grandview is located along Tennessee State Route 68, 3.6 miles (5.8 km) north-northeast of Spring City.
