= Post Oak, Putnam County, Tennessee =

Post Oak, Tennessee
- Unincorporated community
- Location within Tennessee Location within the United States
- Coordinates: 36°13′02″N 85°28′48″W
- Country: United States
- State: Tennessee
- County: Putnam
- Elevation: 1,148 ft (350 m)
- Time zone: UTC-6 (Central (CST))
  - Summer (DST): UTC-5 (CDT)
- Area code: 931
- GNIS feature ID: 1310977

Post Oak is an unincorporated community in Putnam County, Tennessee, United States.
