= Willette, Tennessee =

- Unincorporated community
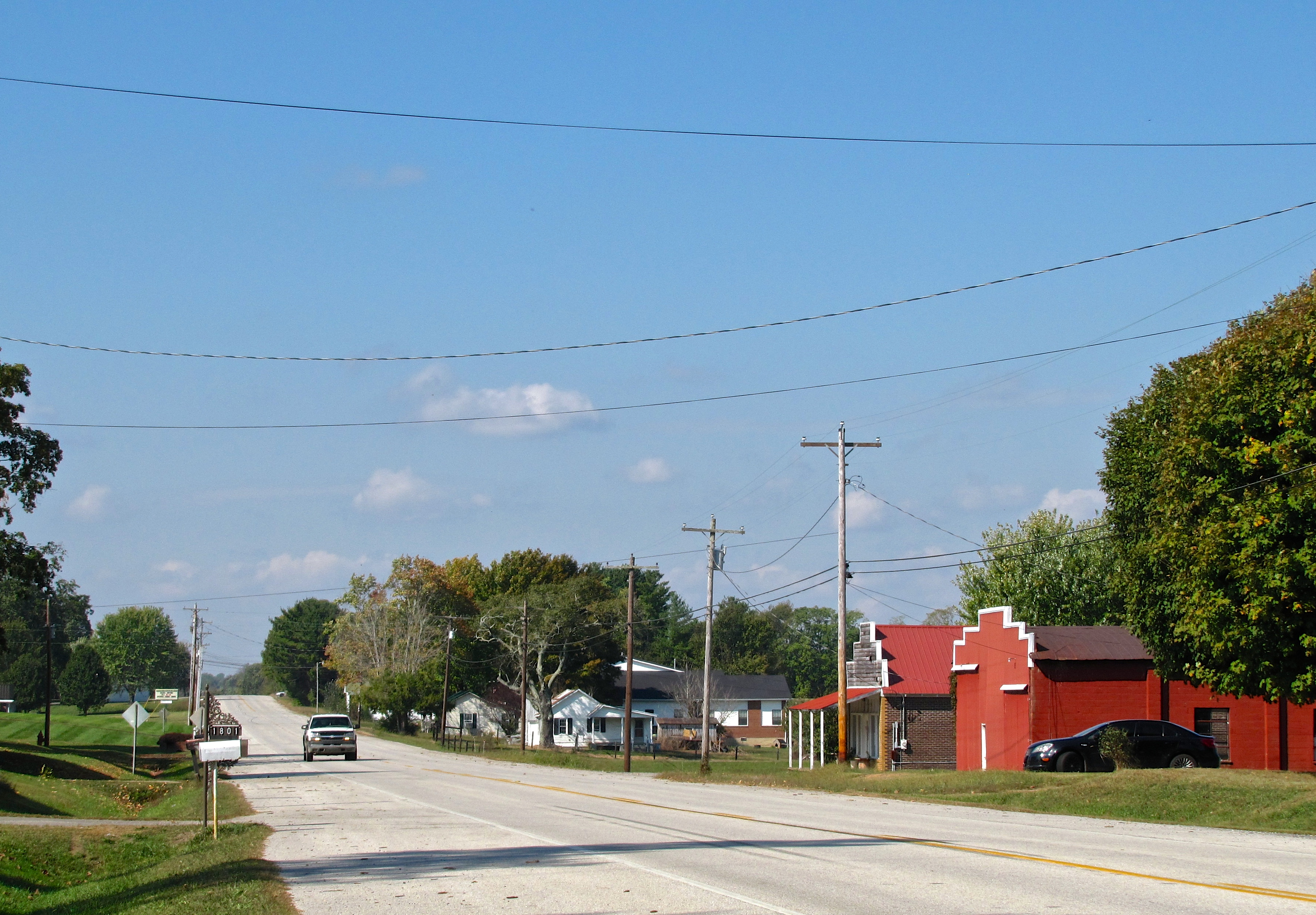
- SR 56 in Willette

- Location within Tennessee Location within the United States
- Coordinates: 36°26′28″N 85°51′01″W
- Country: United States
- State: Tennessee
- County: Macon
- Elevation: 1,004 ft (306 m)
- Time zone: UTC-6 (Central (CST))
  - Summer (DST): UTC-5 (CDT)
- ZIP code: 37150
- Area code: 615
- GNIS feature ID: 1304598

Willette is an unincorporated community in Macon County, Tennessee, United States.

== Geography ==
Willette is concentrated around the intersection of State Route 56, State Route 80, and State Route 262 in the southeastern part of the county.

== Points of interest ==
Willette is home to a volunteer fire department, several churches, and several small businesses.
