= Crawford, Tennessee =

- unincorporated community
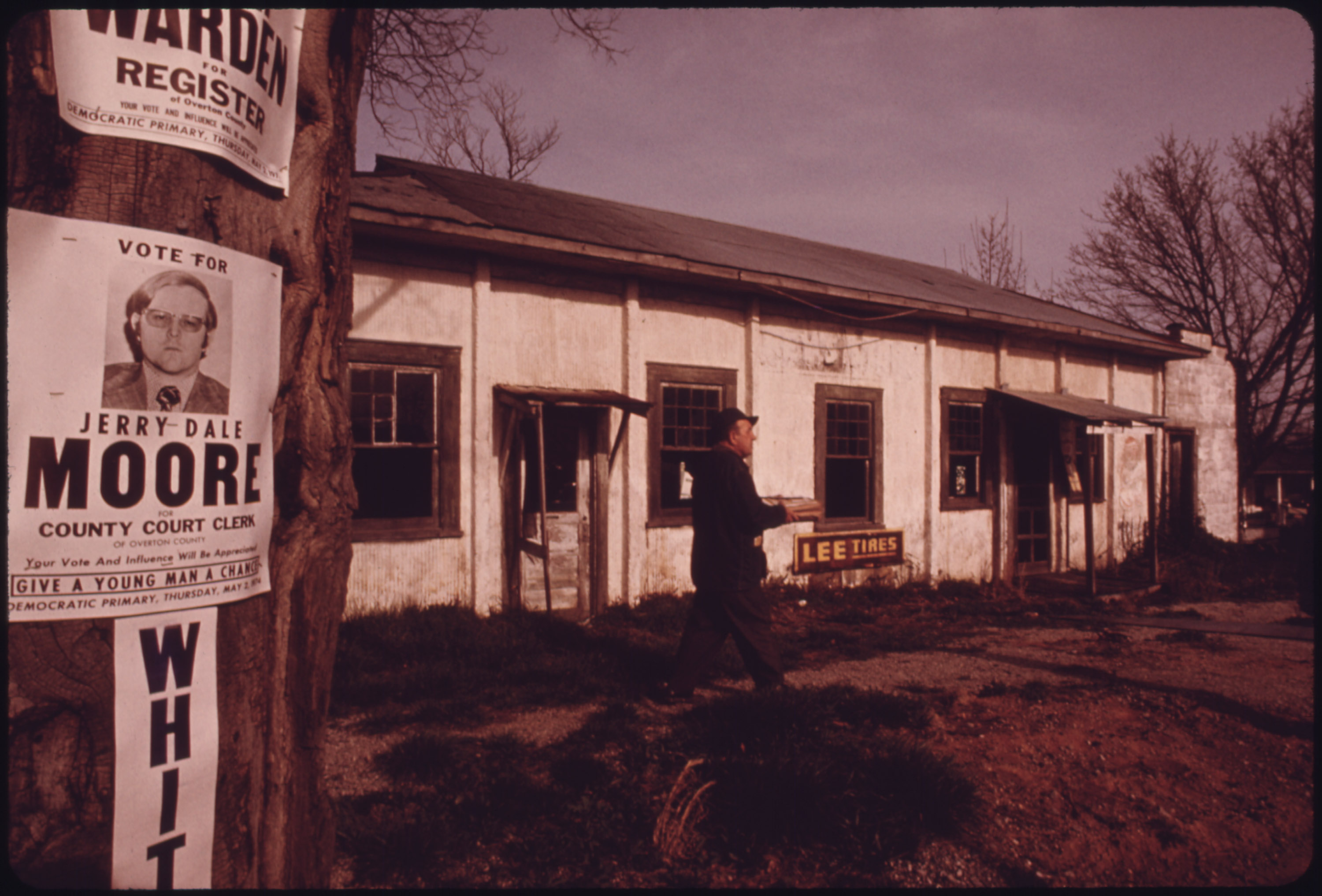
- Shops in Crawford in 1974

- Location within the state of Tennessee Crawford, Tennessee (the United States)
- Coordinates: 36°16′09″N 85°09′39″W
- Country: United States
- State: Tennessee
- County: Overton
- Elevation: 1,887 ft (575 m)
- Time zone: UTC-6 (Central (CST))
  - Summer (DST): UTC-5 (CDT)
- Zip code: 38554
- Area code: 931
- GNIS feature ID: 1281572

Crawford is an unincorporated community in Overton County, Tennessee, United States. It is located just south of the intersection of Tennessee State Route 85 (Wilder Highway) and Tennessee State Route 164 (Hanging Limb Highway). Crawford has its own post office, with Zip code 38554.
