= Winona, Putnam County, Tennessee =

Winona, Tennessee
- Unincorporated community
- Location within Tennessee Location within the United States
- Coordinates: 36°08′45″N 85°27′24″W
- Country: United States
- State: Tennessee
- County: Putnam
- Elevation: 1,155 ft (352 m)
- Time zone: UTC-6 (Central (CST))
  - Summer (DST): UTC-5 (CDT)
- Area code: 931
- GNIS feature ID: 1647439

Winona is an unincorporated community in Putnam County, Tennessee, United States.
