= Enigma, Tennessee =

Unincorporated community in Tennessee, US

Coordinates: 36.2306°N 85.7939°W

Enigma is an unincorporated community in Smith County, in the U.S. state of Tennessee.

== History ==
A post office was established at Enigma in 1882, and remained in operation until 1905. According to tradition, the community was named for a feud or "enigma" between locals over the use of a church.
