= Glade Creek, Tennessee =

Unincorporated community in Tennessee, United States

Coordinates: 36°00′19″N 85°16′18″W

Glade Creek is an unincorporated community in the southeastern panhandle of Putnam County, Tennessee.

Half of the households in Glade Creek are of Czechoslovak descent. Many residents of the area moved from Wheeling to work in the Ravenscroft coal mine nearby across the White County line.

== Geography ==
It is impossible to reach Glade Creek by road from the rest of Putnam County without driving through at least one other county. The two routes recommended by Google to reach the county seat and largest city of Cookeville go through Mayland and Cumberland Cove in neighboring Cumberland County or Bon Air and Sparta in neighboring White County. Even the main street of the community, Glade Creek Road, begins in White County's Ravenscroft community and ends as the Main Street of Pleasant Hill. Despite Glade Creek Road being the only through road in this portion of Putnam County, it's considered a local road rather than a collector road by both Putnam County and the Tennessee Department of Transportation's official maps of Cumberland, Putnam and White Counties. The nearest collector roads considered "functional" routes by TDOT are the Ravenscroft Road in White County and Mayland Road in Cumberland County.
