= Grimsley, Tennessee =

- Census-designated place
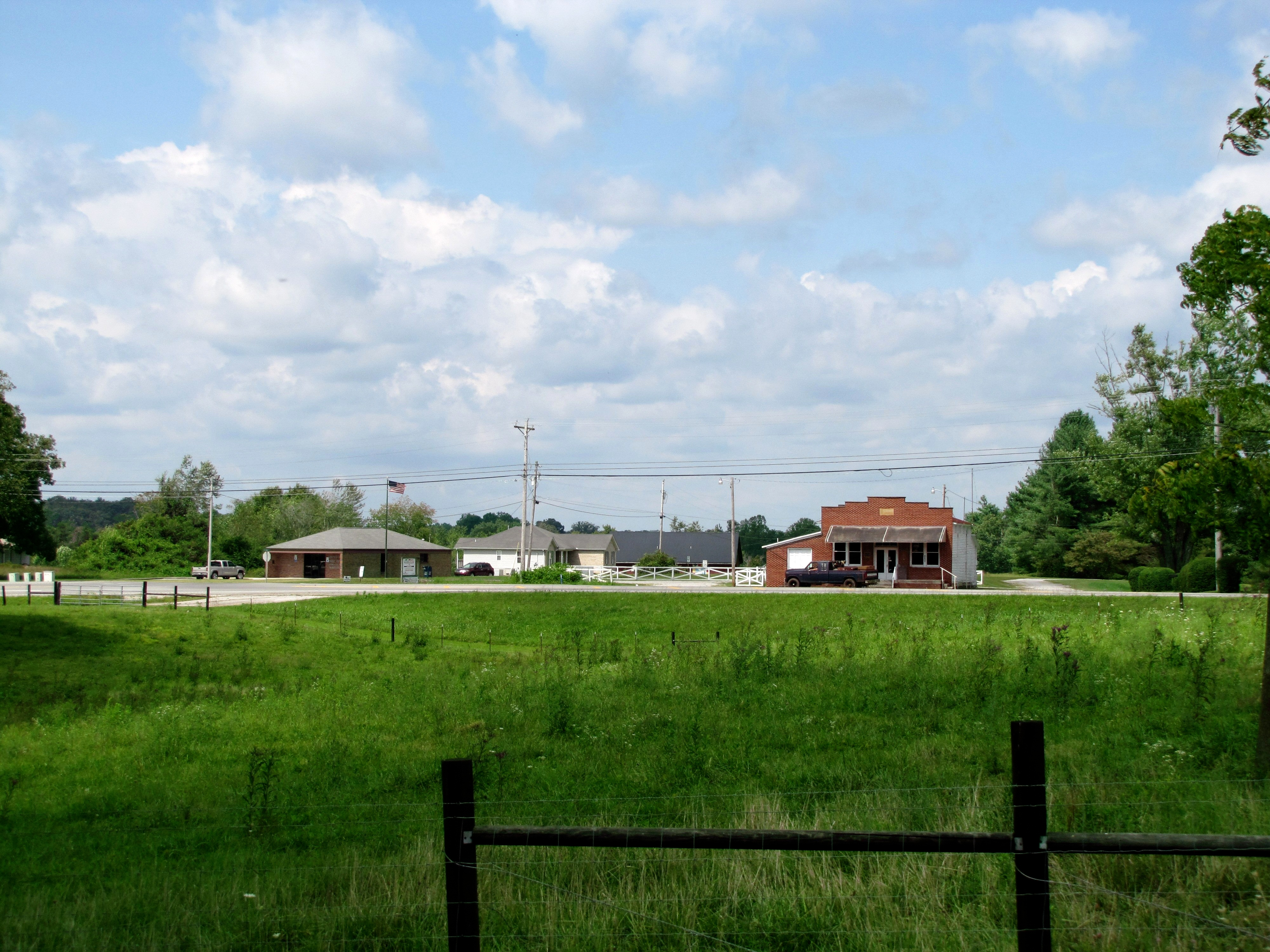
- Post office and Beaty General Store in Grimsley

- Location within Tennessee Location within the United States
- Coordinates: 36°16′01″N 84°59′04″W
- Country: United States
- State: Tennessee
- County: Fentress

Area
  - Total: 10.89 sq mi (28.20 km^{2})
  - Land: 10.89 sq mi (28.20 km^{2})
  - Water: 0 sq mi (0.00 km^{2})
- Elevation: 1,749 ft (533 m)

Population (2020)
  - Total: 1,219
  - Density: 112.0/sq mi (43.23/km^{2})
- Time zone: UTC-5 (CST)
  - Summer (DST): UTC-4 (CST)
- ZIP code: 38565
- Area code: 931
- GNIS feature ID: 1286299
- FIPS code: 47-31420

Grimsley is an unincorporated community and census-designated place (CDP) in Fentress County, Tennessee, United States. Its population was 1,167 as of the 2010 census. Its ZIP code is 38565.

== Geography ==
The community is located in southern Fentress County on the Cumberland Plateau. The settled part is located on high ground in the center of the CDP, with elevations ranging from 1,700 to 1,800 feet (520 to 550 m). The west side of the CDP drops into the gorge of the East Fork of the Obey River, with a bottom elevation of 800 to 900 feet (240 to 270 m), and the east side follows the valley of the North Prong of Clear Fork, with an elevation of 1,600 feet (490 m). Both rivers are part of the Cumberland River watershed.

U.S. Route 127 is the main road through the community, leading north 12 miles (19 km) to Jamestown, the Fentress County seat, and south 6.5 miles (10.5 km) to Clarkrange. Tennessee State Route 85 forms the southwestern edge of the CDP, dropping by switchbacks into the gorge of the East Fork of the Obey and leading 33 miles (53 km) to Livingston.

According to the U.S. Census Bureau, the Grimsley CDP has an area of 10.9 square miles (28.2 km^{2}), all of it land.

== Demographics ==
Historical population
Census	Pop.	Note	%±
2020	1,219		—
U.S. Decennial Census

=== 2020 census ===
Grimsley racial composition
Race	Number	Percentage
White (non-Hispanic)	1,170	95.98%
Black or African American (non-Hispanic)	3	0.25%
Native American	2	0.16%
Asian	2	0.16%
Other/Mixed	31	2.54%
Hispanic or Latino	11	0.9%

As of the 2020 United States census, there were 1,219 people, 357 households, and 252 families residing in the CDP.
