= Bangham, Tennessee =

Unincorporated community in Tennessee, US

Coordinates: 36°14′50″N 85°28′15″W

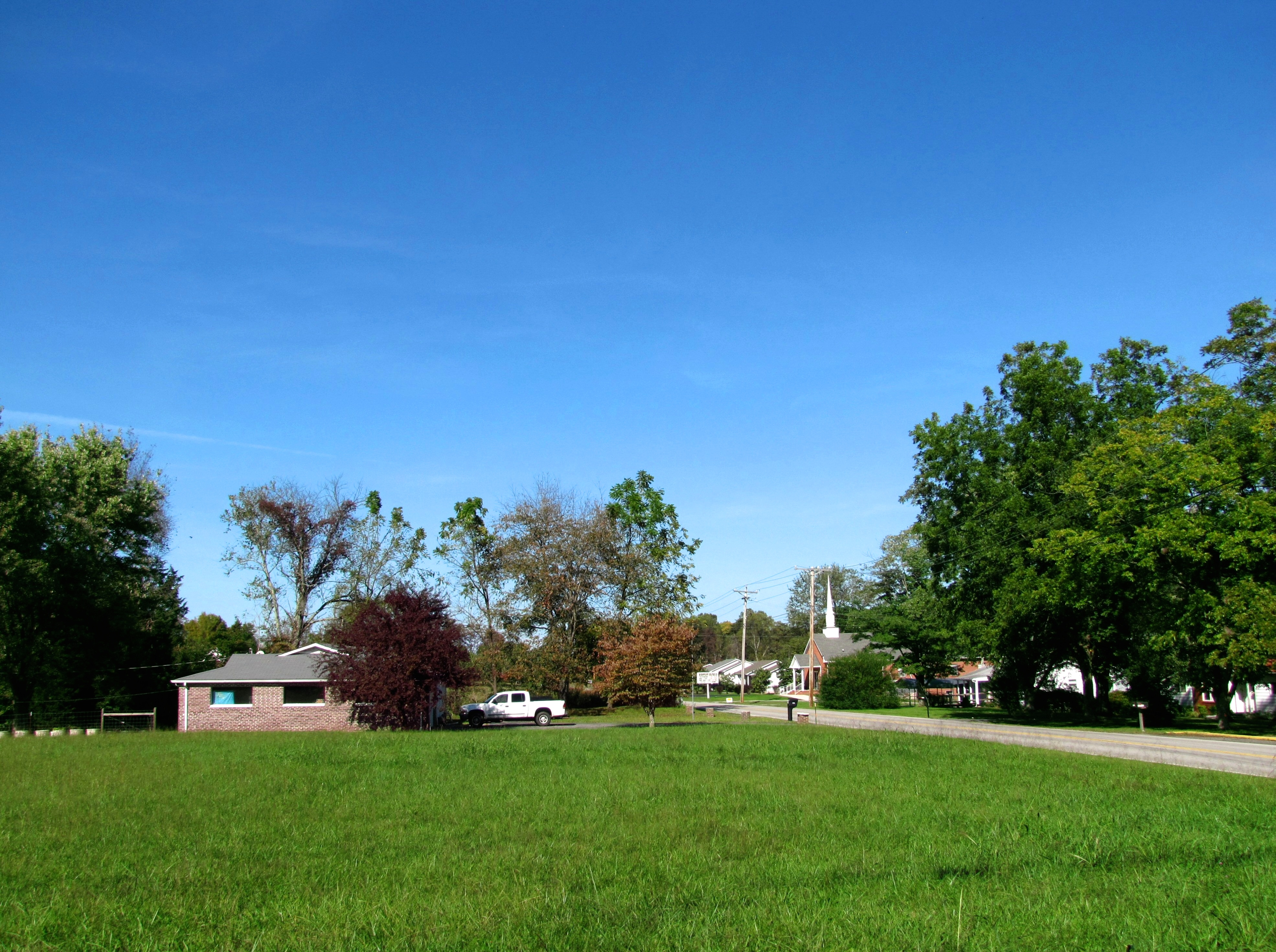
Buildings along Hilham Road (State Route 136) in Bangham

Bangham is an unincorporated community in northern Putnam County, Tennessee, United States. It is concentrated around the intersection of Hilham Road (Tennessee State Route 136) and Paran Road, north of Cookeville.

The Bangham Community Center, located along Hilham Road, was originally a school built by the Works Progress Administration in 1936. The center is now home to the Hollis Moore Loftis Library, named for a popular teacher who once taught at the school.
