= Rickman, Tennessee =

- Unincorporated community
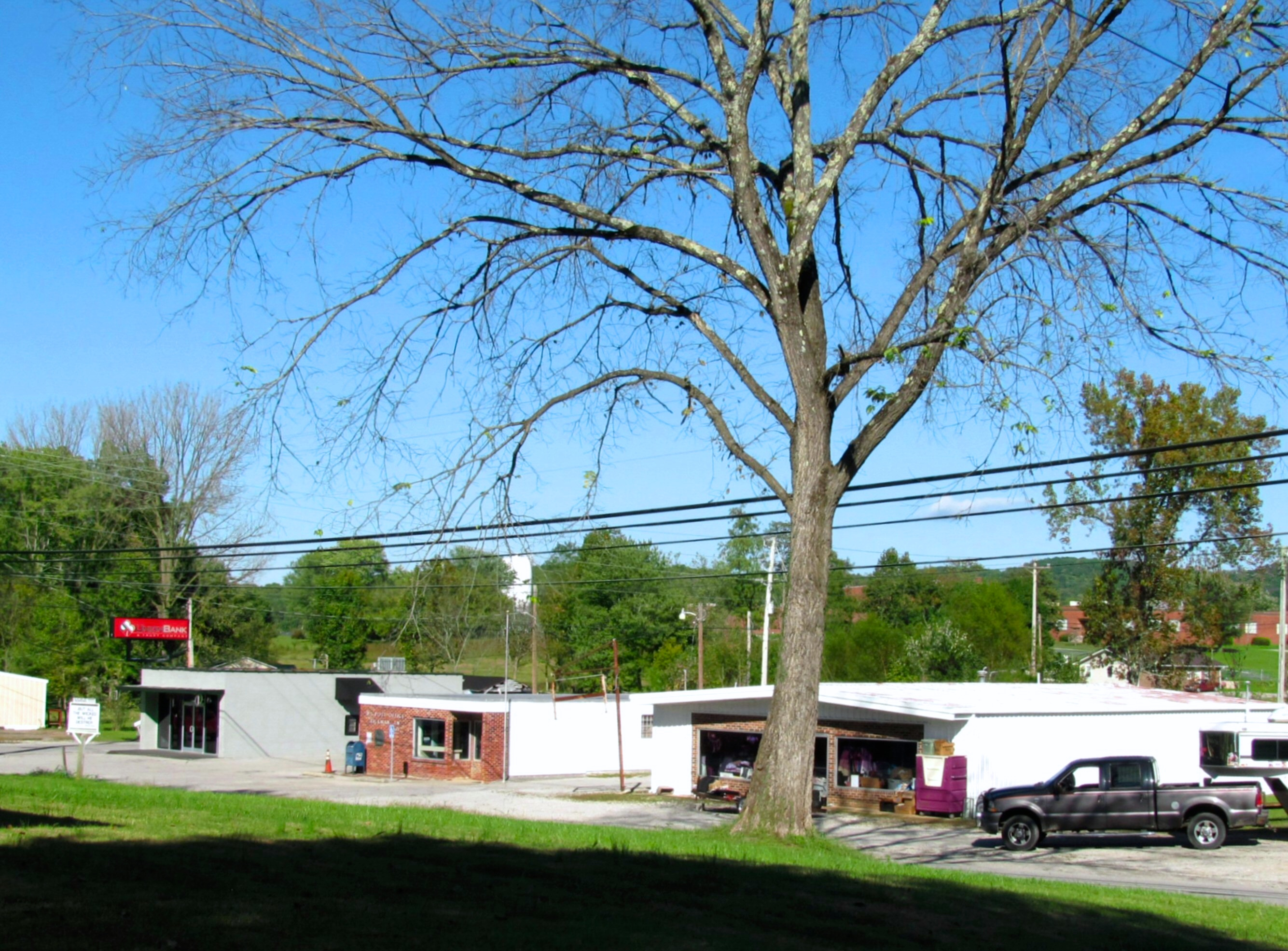
- Buildings along Rickman Road (former SR 42) in Rickman

- Location within Tennessee Location within the United States
- Coordinates: 36°15′45″N 85°22′32″W
- Country: United States
- State: Tennessee
- County: Overton
- Elevation: 1,079 ft (329 m)
- Time zone: UTC-6 (Central (CST))
  - Summer (DST): UTC-5 (CDT)
- ZIP code: 38580
- Area code: 931
- GNIS feature ID: 1299382

Rickman is an unincorporated community in Overton County, Tennessee, United States. Its ZIP code is 38580. The community is concentrated around the intersection of Rickman Monterey Highway (State Route 293) and Rickman Road (former State Route 42), northeast of Algood and southwest of Livingston, and is home to a post office, an elementary school, and several churches and small businesses. State Route 111 does pass through the community along the west side.

== History ==
Originally known as Bilbrey's Crossing, Rickman was later renamed for Carney H. Rickman, who operated a large lumber yard nearby along the railroad.

== Education ==
Rickman is home to one primary school, which is Rickman Elementary School. In 2011, RES had 765 students; the school's student-to-teacher ratio was 18:1. Rickman Elementary school was founded in 1917–18.
