= Monroe, Tennessee =

- Unincorporated community
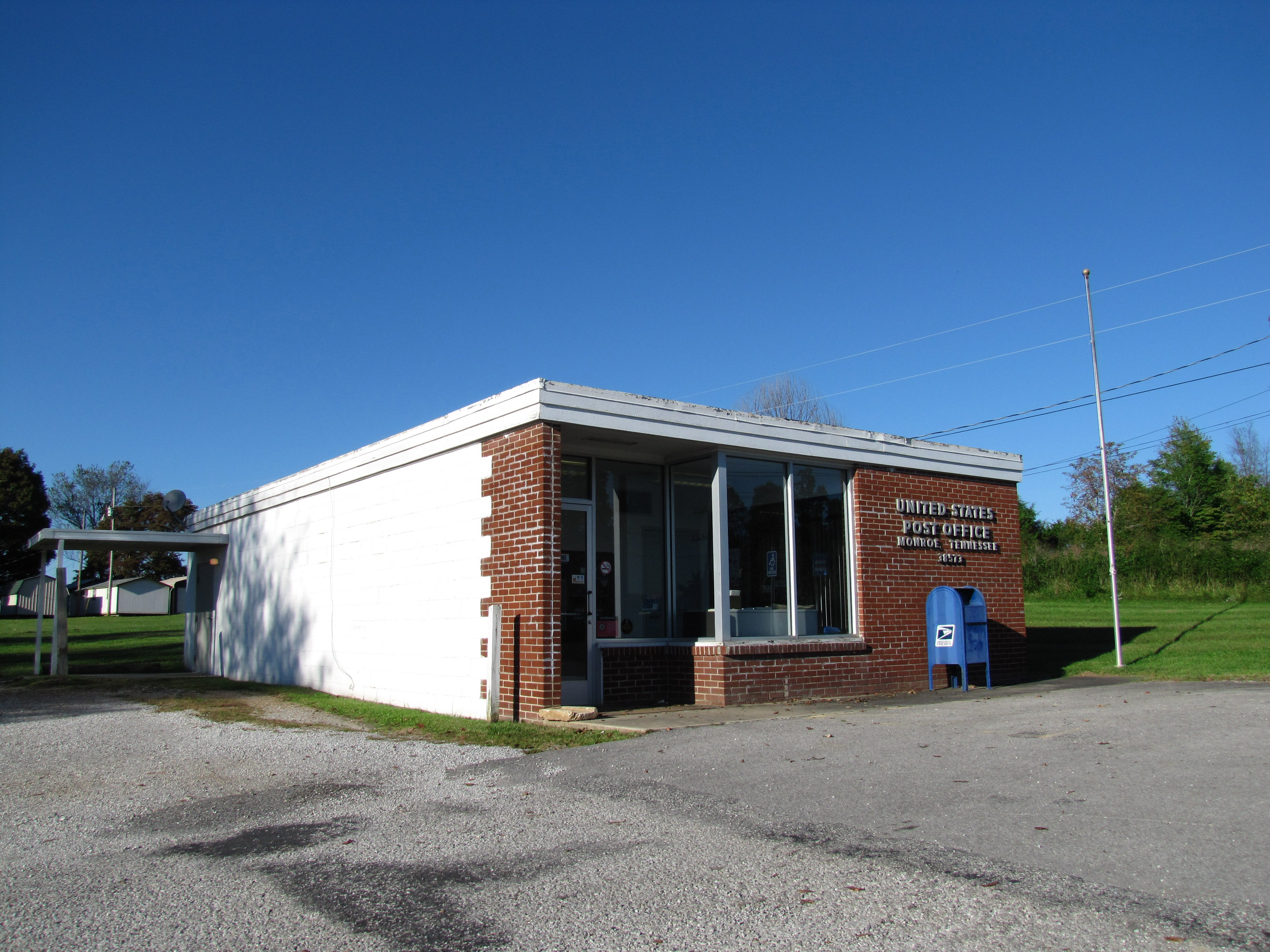
- Post office in Monroe

- Location within Tennessee Location within the United States
- Coordinates: 36°26′13″N 85°14′33″W
- Country: United States
- State: Tennessee
- County: Overton
- Elevation: 1,024 ft (312 m)
- Time zone: UTC-6 (Central (CST))
  - Summer (DST): UTC-5 (CDT)
- ZIP code: 38573
- Area code: 931
- GNIS feature ID: 1294170

Monroe is an unincorporated community in Overton County, Tennessee, United States. The zipcode is 38573. Monroe is located along State Route 111 northeast of Livingston and southwest of Byrdstown.

Monroe's zipcode also extends into Pickett County.
