= Defeated Creek (Smith County, Tennessee) =

Stream in Tennessee, U.S.

Coordinates: 36.295888°N 85.914986°W

Defeated Creek is a stream in Smith County, Tennessee, in the United States.

Defeated Creek is a tributary to Cordell Hull Lake, where a marina is located.

== See also ==
- List of rivers of Tennessee
