= Defeated, Tennessee =

- Unincorporated community
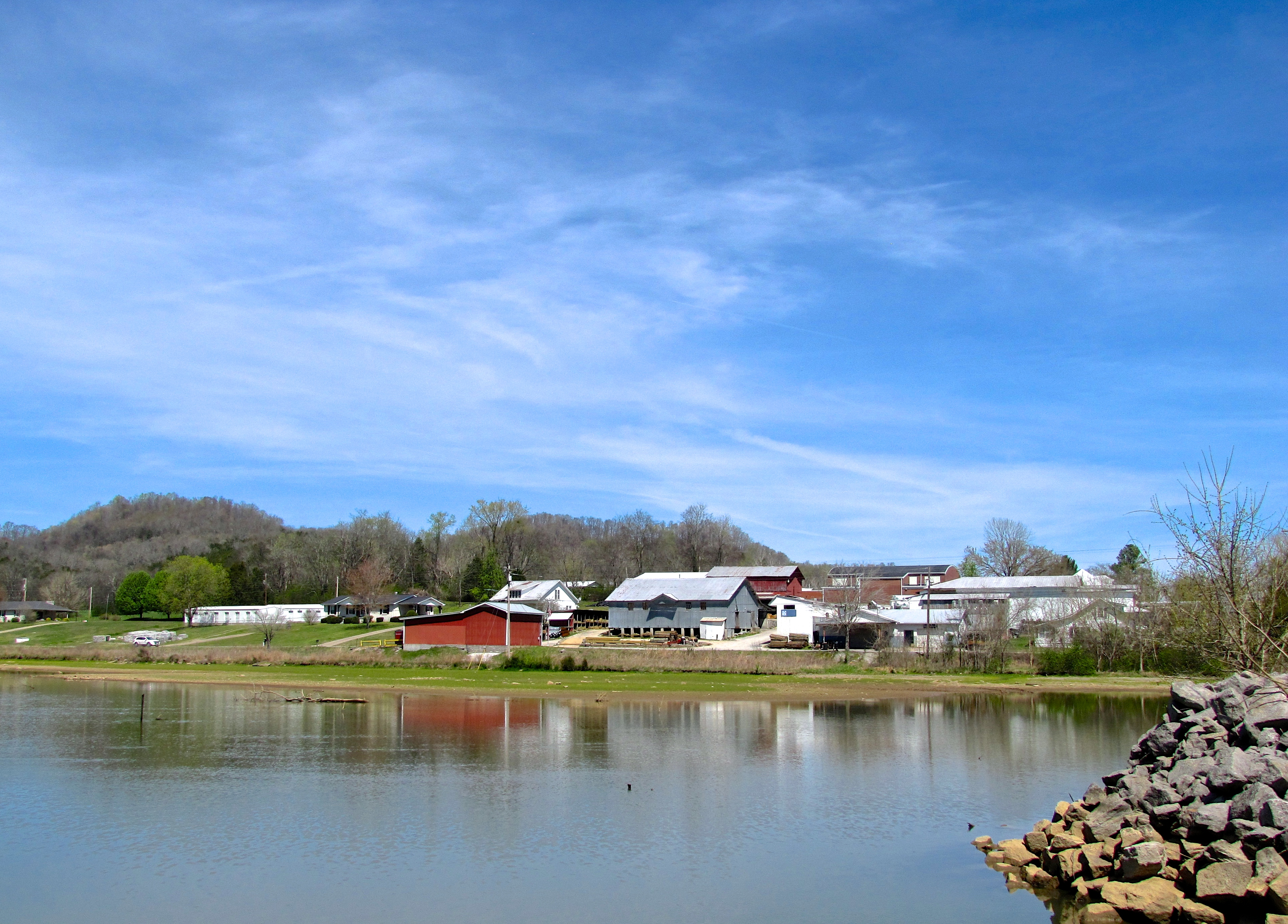
- Buildings and houses in Defeated

- Location within Tennessee Location within the United States
- Coordinates: 36°19′35″N 85°54′30″W
- Country: United States
- State: Tennessee
- County: Smith
- Elevation: 551 ft (168 m)
- Time zone: UTC-6 (Central (CST))
  - Summer (DST): UTC-5 (CDT)
- ZIP Code: 37030
- Area code: 615
- GNIS feature ID: 1306322

Defeated is an unincorporated community in Smith County, Tennessee, United States. It is located northeast of Carthage along Defeated Creek, a tributary of the Cumberland River (the lower part of the creek and the adjacent section of the river are both part of Cordell Hull Lake). State Route 85 passes through the community.

Defeated is named for the events that took place in the late 18th century along the banks of Defeated Creek. John Peyton, one of the earliest settlers and explorers of Smith County, and his surveying party were camped along the creek when they were attacked by a band of Cherokees led by Hanging Maw and driven out of the area.

Defeated was the site of a post office from 1824 until 1929. The post office had the name Montrose from 1824 through 1880, when the name was changed to Defeated.

Defeated is home to the Defeated Creek Marina, which lies along the Defeated Creek section of Cordell Hull Lake. The marina is home to a boat dock and ramp, rental cabins, and numerous recreational facilities. Additionally, there is a park called Defeated Creek Park adjacent to the marina. It has a campground with 155 sites and several miles of trails.
