= Smith County, Tennessee =

County in Tennessee, United States

- County
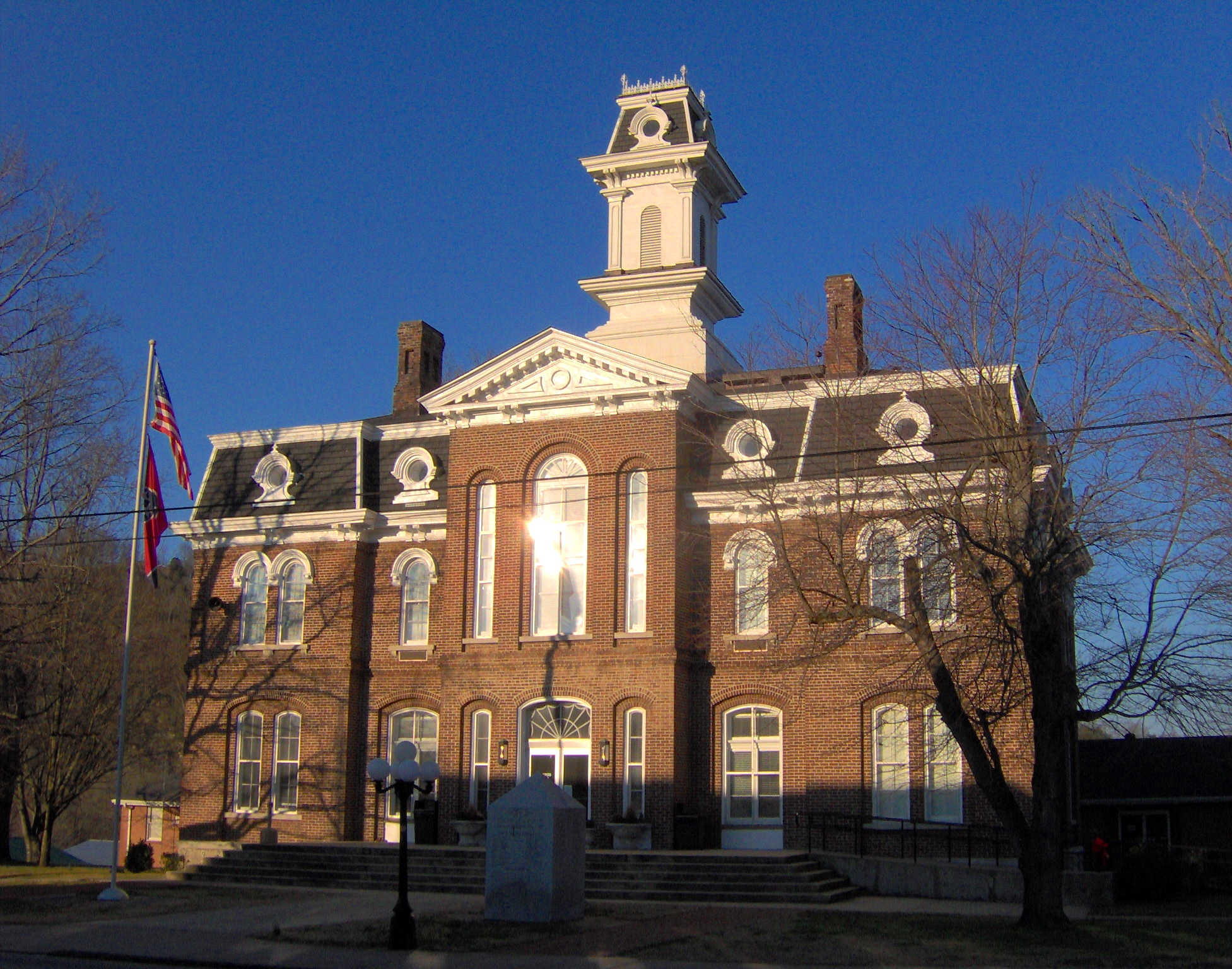
- Smith County Courthouse in Carthage

- Location within the U.S. state of Tennessee
- Coordinates: 36°15′N 85°58′W
- Country: United States
- State: Tennessee
- Founded: 1799
- Named for: Daniel Smith
- Seat: Carthage
- Largest town: Carthage

Area
  - Total: 325 sq mi (840 km^{2})
  - Land: 314 sq mi (810 km^{2})
  - Water: 11 sq mi (28 km^{2}) 3.4%

Population (2020)
  - Total: 19,904
  - Estimate (2025): 20,981 ▲
  - Density: 61/sq mi (24/km^{2})
- Time zone: UTC−6 (Central)
  - Summer (DST): UTC−5 (CDT)
- Congressional district: 6th
- Website: smithcotn.com

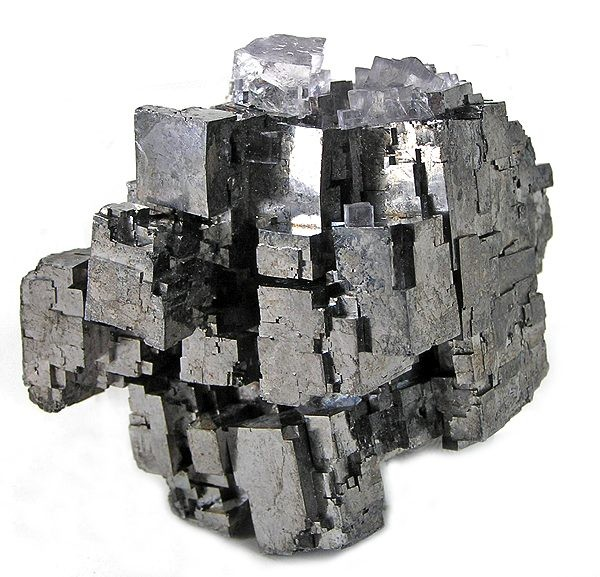
Galena-fluorite specimen from the Elmwood mine, south of Carthage

Smith County is a county in the U.S. state of Tennessee. As of the 2020 census, the population was 19,904. Smith County is located in the region of the state known as Middle Tennessee. Its county seat is Carthage. The county was organized in 1799 and is named for Daniel Smith, a Revolutionary War veteran who made the first map of Tennessee and served as a United States senator.

Smith County is part of the Nashville-Davidson–Murfreesboro–Franklin, TN Metropolitan Statistical Area.

== History ==
Smith County was established in 1799 from a portion of Sumner County, and was named for Daniel Smith, a U.S. Senator and former Secretary of the Southwest Territory. The location of the county seat was hotly contested between Bledsoesborough (near modern Dixon Springs) and William Walton's ferry and tavern at the confluence of the Caney Fork and the Cumberland River. In 1804, voters chose Walton's site, and a town, named Carthage, was platted the following year.

Smith County was the site of a large saltpeter mine. Piper Cave, located near Monoville, contains the poorly preserved remnants of dozens of saltpeter leaching vats. Most saltpeter mining in Middle Tennessee took place during the War of 1812 and the Civil War, though the exact dates of this operation are unclear.

== Geography ==
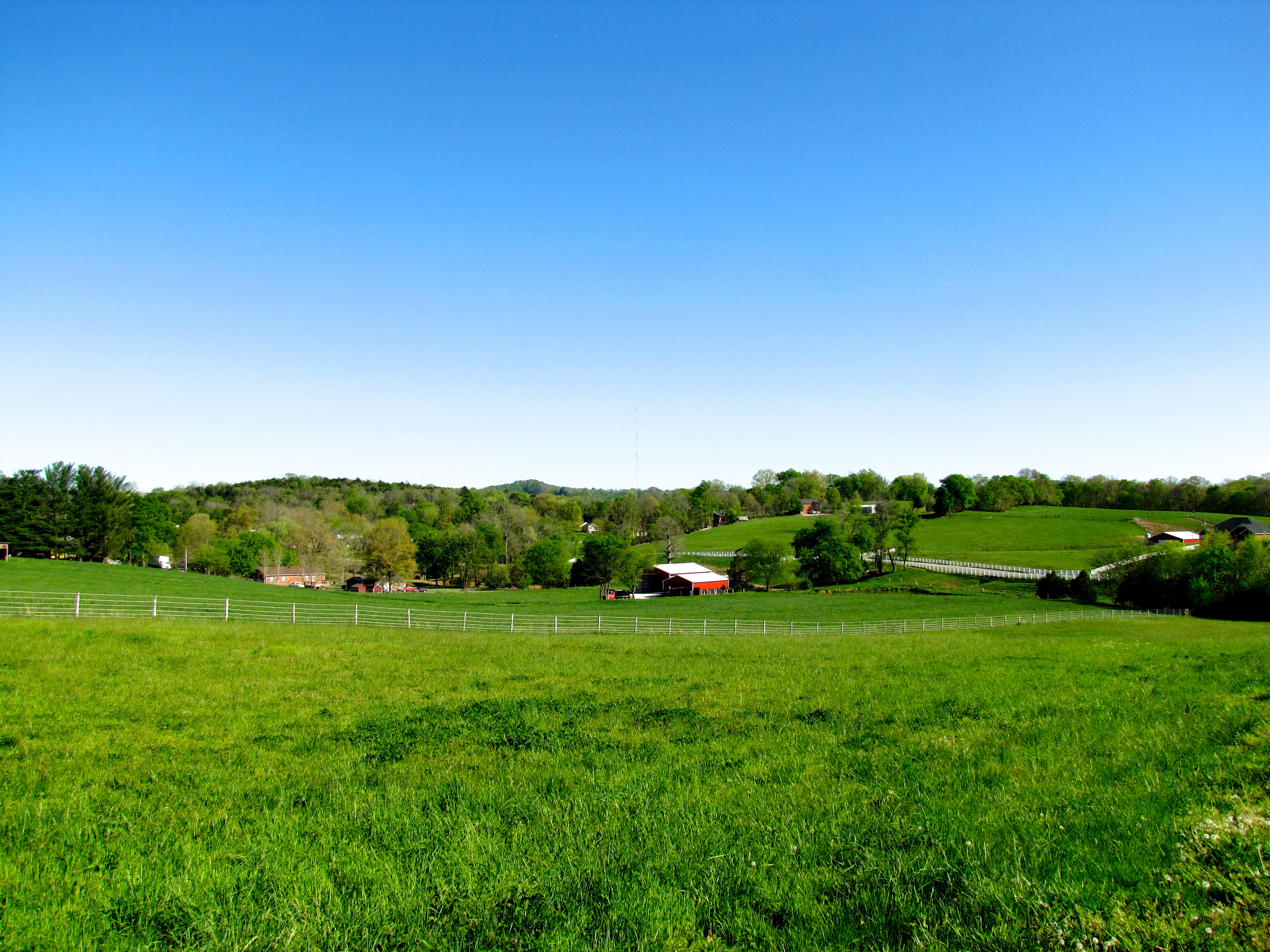
Houses and buildings near Gordonsville

According to the U.S. Census Bureau, the county has a total area of 325 square miles (840 km^{2}), of which 314 square miles (810 km^{2}) is land and 11 square miles (28 km^{2}) (3.4%) is water. The county is located in a transition area between the rugged Highland Rim to the east and the flatter Nashville Basin to the west. The Caney Fork has its confluence with the Cumberland River in Carthage; these are the primary waterways flowing through the county. Cordell Hull Dam on the Cumberland is located near Carthage. The county is also known for scenic views of rolling hills located within the county.

=== Adjacent counties ===
- Macon County (north)
- Jackson County (northeast)
- Putnam County (east)
- DeKalb County (southeast)
- Wilson County (west)
- Trousdale County (northwest)

=== State protected areas ===
- Cordell Hull Wildlife Management Area (part)

=== Highways ===
- I-40
- US 70N
- SR 25
- SR 53
- SR 80
- SR 85
- SR 141
- SR 263
- SR 264

== Demographics ==
Historical population
Census	Pop.	Note	%±
1800	4,294		—
1810	11,649		171.3%
1820	17,580		50.9%
1830	19,906		13.2%
1840	21,179		6.4%
1850	18,412		−13.1%
1860	16,357		−11.2%
1870	15,994		−2.2%
1880	17,799		11.3%
1890	18,404		3.4%
1900	19,026		3.4%
1910	18,548		−2.5%
1920	17,134		−7.6%
1930	15,473		−9.7%
1940	16,148		4.4%
1950	14,098		−12.7%
1960	12,059		−14.5%
1970	12,059		0.0%
1980	14,935		23.8%
1990	14,143		−5.3%
2000	17,712		25.2%
2010	19,166		8.2%
2020	19,904		3.9%
2025 (est.)	20,981	▲	5.4%
U.S. Decennial Census; 1790-1960 1900-1990; 1990-2000 2010-2014

=== Racial and ethnic composition ===
Smith County, Tennessee – Racial and ethnic composition Note: the US Census treats Hispanic/Latino as an ethnic category. This table excludes Latinos from the racial categories and assigns them to a separate category. Hispanics/Latinos may be of any race.
Race / Ethnicity (NH = Non-Hispanic)	Pop 1980	Pop 1990	Pop 2000	Pop 2010	Pop 2020	% 1980	% 1990	% 2000	% 2010	% 2020
White alone (NH)	14,212	13,589	16,809	18,002	18,054	95.16%	96.08%	94.90%	93.93%	90.71%
Black or African American alone (NH)	573	459	447	405	356	3.84%	3.25%	2.52%	2.11%	1.79%
Native American or Alaska Native alone (NH)	12	36	61	81	61	0.08%	0.25%	0.34%	0.42%	0.31%
Asian alone (NH)	11	9	30	32	84	0.07%	0.06%	0.17%	0.17%	0.42%
Native Hawaiian or Pacific Islander alone (NH)	x	x	1	3	0	x	x	0.01%	0.02%	0.00%
Other race alone (NH)	0	2	13	4	20	0.00%	0.01%	0.07%	0.02%	0.10%
Mixed race or Multiracial (NH)	x	x	151	222	811	x	x	0.85%	1.16%	4.07%
Hispanic or Latino (any race)	127	48	200	417	518	0.85%	0.34%	1.13%	2.18%	2.60%
Total	14,935	14,143	17,712	19,166	19,904	100.00%	100.00%	100.00%	100.00%	100.00%

=== 2020 census ===
As of the 2020 census, there were 19,904 people, 7,663 households, and 5,409 families residing in the county. The median age was 41.2 years, with 23.0% of residents under the age of 18 and 17.4% of residents 65 years of age or older. For every 100 females there were 96.4 males, and for every 100 females age 18 and over there were 94.1 males age 18 and over.

The racial makeup of the county was 91.4% White, 1.8% Black or African American, 0.5% American Indian and Alaska Native, 0.4% Asian, less than 0.1% Native Hawaiian and Pacific Islander, 1.0% from some other race, and 4.9% from two or more races. Hispanic or Latino residents of any race comprised 2.6% of the population.

Of those households, 31.4% had children under the age of 18 living in them. Of all households, 53.9% were married-couple households, 16.7% were households with a male householder and no spouse or partner present, and 23.2% were households with a female householder and no spouse or partner present. About 24.6% of all households were made up of individuals and 11.4% had someone living alone who was 65 years of age or older.

There were 8,513 housing units, of which 10.0% were vacant. Among occupied housing units, 75.7% were owner-occupied and 24.3% were renter-occupied. The homeowner vacancy rate was 1.9% and the rental vacancy rate was 6.3%.

Less than 0.1% of residents lived in urban areas, while 100.0% lived in rural areas.

=== 2000 census ===
As of the census of 2000, there were 17,712 people, 6,878 households, and 5,069 families residing in the county. The population density was 56 people per square mile (22 people/km^{2}). There were 7,665 housing units at an average density of 24 units per square mile (9.3/km^{2}). The racial makeup of the county was 95.42% White, 2.53% Black or African American, 0.37% Native American, 0.17% Asian, 0.01% Pacific Islander, 0.59% from other races, and 0.93% from two or more races. 1.13% of the population were Hispanic or Latino of any race.

There were 6,878 households, out of which 34.10% had children under the age of 18 living with them, 60.10% were married couples living together, 9.80% had a female householder with no husband present, and 26.30% were non-families. 23.40% of all households were made up of individuals, and 11.10% had someone living alone who was 65 years of age or older. The average household size was 2.55 and the average family size was 3.00.

In the county, the population was spread out, with 25.50% under the age of 18, 8.00% from 18 to 24, 30.00% from 25 to 44, 23.10% from 45 to 64, and 13.40% who were 65 years of age or older. The median age was 37 years. For every 100 females, there were 97.00 males. For every 100 females age 18 and over, there were 92.40 males.

The median income for a household in the county was $35,625, and the median income for a family was $41,645. Males had a median income of $30,853 versus $22,133 for females. The per capita income for the county was $17,473. About 10.30% of families and 12.20% of the population were below the poverty line, including 14.70% of those under age 18 and 14.80% of those age 65 or over.

== Communities ==
=== Towns ===
- Carthage (county seat)
- Gordonsville
- South Carthage

=== Census-designated place ===
- Hickman

=== Unincorporated communities ===
- Brush Creek
- Chestnut Mound
- Defeated
- Difficult
- Dixon Springs
- Elmwood
- Enigma
- Kempville
- Lancaster
- New Middleton
- Pleasant Shade
- Riddleton
- Rome
- Stonewall
- Sykes

== Education ==
The Smith County School System operates nine schools:

- Carthage Elementary School, Carthage (PreK–4)
- Defeated Elementary School, Defeated (PreK–8)
- Forks River Elementary School, Elmwood (PreK–8)
- Gordonsville Elementary School, Gordonsville (3–6)
- Gordonsville High School, Gordonsville (7–12)
- New Middleton Elementary School, New Middleton (PreK–2)
- Union Heights Elementary School, Rome (PreK–8)
- Smith County Middle School, South Carthage (5–8)
- Smith County High School, Carthage (9–12)

The county formerly operated Pleasant Shade Elementary School, which closed in 2007, and Cox Davidson Elementary, which closed sometime in the 1950s. New Middleton Elementary was formerly PreK–8, while Gordonsville Elementary was formerly PreK–6. A realignment beginning with the 2017–2018 school year resulted in the current grade alignment of those schools.

== Politics ==
Prior to 2008, Smith County was a Democratic Party stronghold at the presidential level. The county failed to back a Democratic candidate only twice between the Civil War and 2004, when voting for George Wallace in 1968 and against George McGovern in 1972. However, while the county was Carthage resident Al Gore's fourth strongest statewide in his 2000 presidential bid, he failed to win an increasingly Republican Tennessee. Democrat John Kerry won the county in 2004, but by a much narrower four point margin. Since then, Smith County has swung hard towards the Republican Party similar to the rest of the state outside of Memphis and Nashville. Hillary Clinton failed to win even a quarter of the county's votes in 2016, a far cry from the 71 percent and 62 percent her husband Bill won in the county with Gore also on the ticket.

United States presidential election results for Smith County, Tennessee
Year	Republican		Democratic		Third party(ies)	
Year	No.	%	No.	%	No.	%
1912	915	30.89%	1,863	62.90%	184	6.21%
1916	941	29.98%	2,196	69.96%	2	0.06%
1920	1,981	38.61%	3,150	61.39%	0	0.00%
1924	700	28.82%	1,701	70.03%	28	1.15%
1928	1,150	43.94%	1,446	55.25%	21	0.80%
1932	595	22.30%	2,057	77.10%	16	0.60%
1936	626	22.96%	2,092	76.74%	8	0.29%
1940	648	22.30%	2,244	77.22%	14	0.48%
1944	887	29.51%	2,107	70.09%	12	0.40%
1948	773	27.33%	1,764	62.38%	291	10.29%
1952	1,412	34.80%	2,622	64.61%	24	0.59%
1956	1,267	29.96%	2,949	69.73%	13	0.31%
1960	1,601	39.43%	2,411	59.38%	48	1.18%
1964	1,084	26.98%	2,934	73.02%	0	0.00%
1968	1,089	24.96%	1,443	33.07%	1,831	41.97%
1972	1,812	56.84%	1,260	39.52%	116	3.64%
1976	1,332	25.93%	3,753	73.07%	51	0.99%
1980	1,755	31.73%	3,674	66.43%	102	1.84%
1984	2,393	42.05%	3,258	57.25%	40	0.70%
1988	2,138	45.63%	2,522	53.82%	26	0.55%
1992	1,482	21.04%	5,061	71.85%	501	7.11%
1996	1,857	30.66%	3,812	62.94%	388	6.41%
2000	2,384	32.44%	4,884	66.47%	80	1.09%
2004	3,739	47.76%	4,044	51.66%	45	0.57%
2008	4,563	58.95%	2,992	38.65%	186	2.40%
2012	4,495	63.41%	2,470	34.84%	124	1.75%
2016	5,494	73.88%	1,689	22.71%	253	3.40%
2020	7,136	78.84%	1,802	19.91%	113	1.25%
2024	7,655	81.99%	1,595	17.08%	86	0.92%

== See also ==
- National Register of Historic Places listings in Smith County, Tennessee
