= Pleasant Shade, Tennessee =

Pleasant Shade
- Unincorporated community
- Location within Tennessee Location within the United States
- Coordinates: 36°22′41″N 85°56′59″W
- Country: United States
- State: Tennessee
- County: Smith
- Elevation: 525 ft (160 m)
- Time zone: UTC-6 (Central (CST))
  - Summer (DST): UTC-5 (CDT)
- ZIP code: 37145
- Area code: 615
- GNIS feature ID: 1297923

Pleasant Shade is an unincorporated community in northern Smith County, Tennessee, United States. It has a post office, assigned zip code 37145. The community is centered along Tennessee State Route 80.
