= Putnam County, Tennessee =

County in Tennessee, United States

- County
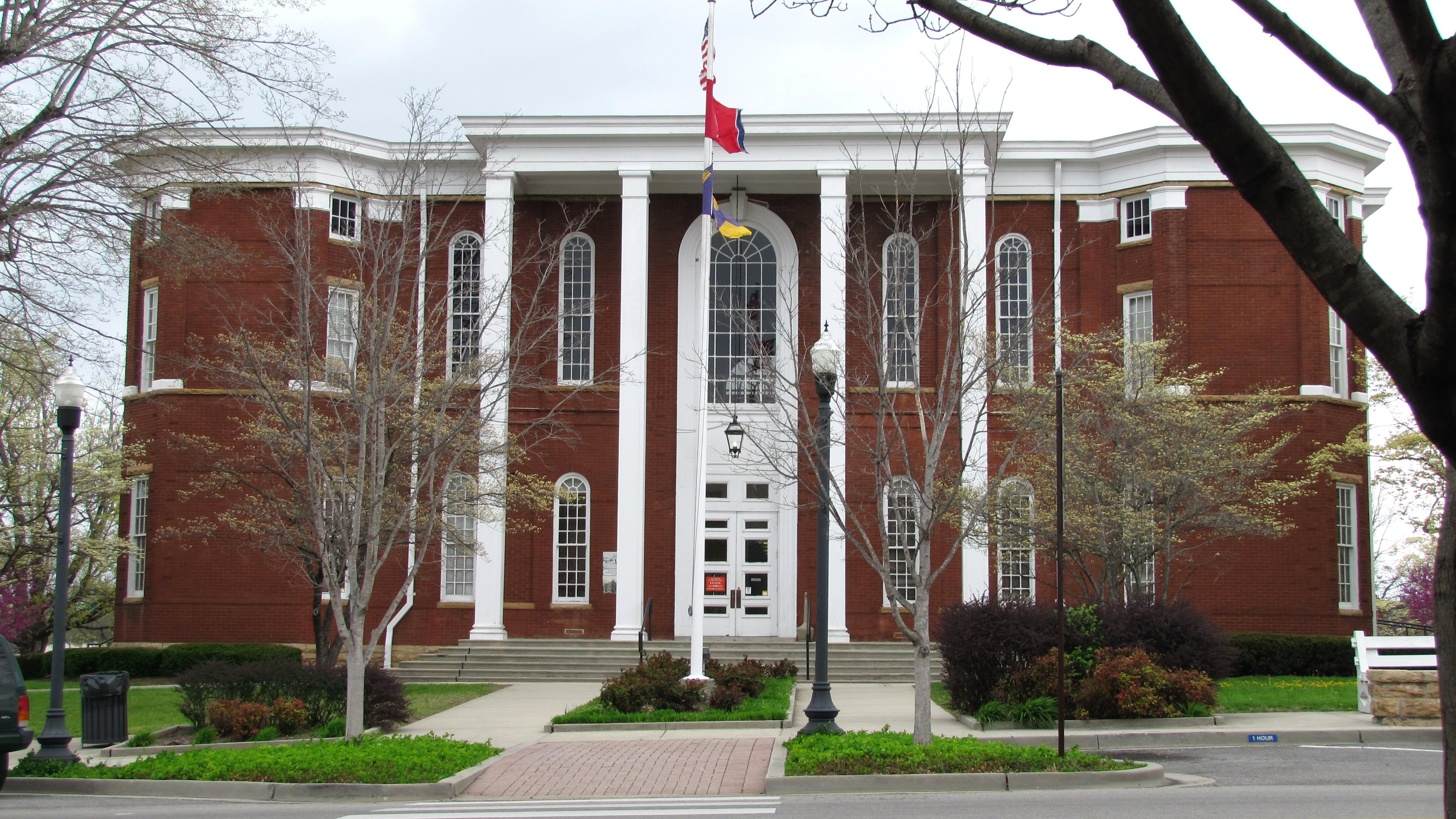
- Putnam County Courthouse

- Logo

- Location within the U.S. state of Tennessee
- Coordinates: 36°08′N 85°30′W
- Country: United States
- State: Tennessee
- Founded: February 11, 1854
- Named for: Israel Putnam
- Seat: Cookeville
- Largest city: Cookeville

Government
  - County executive: Randy Porter (R)

Area
  - Total: 403 sq mi (1,040 km^{2})
  - Land: 401 sq mi (1,040 km^{2})
  - Water: 1.5 sq mi (3.9 km^{2}) 0.4%

Population (2020)
  - Total: 79,854
  - Estimate (2025): 86,612 ▲
  - Density: 199/sq mi (76.9/km^{2})
- Time zone: UTC−6 (Central)
  - Summer (DST): UTC−5 (CDT)
- ZIP Codes: 38501, 38502, 38503, 38505, 38506, 38544, 38545, 38548, 39574, 38582
- Area code: 931
- Congressional district: 6th
- Website: putnamcountytn.gov

Putnam County is a county located in the U.S. state of Tennessee. As of the 2020 census, the population was 79,854. Its county seat is Cookeville. Putnam County is part of the Cookeville, TN Micropolitan Statistical Area.

== History ==
Putnam County is named in honor of Israel Putnam, who was a hero in the French and Indian War and a general in the American Revolutionary War. The county was initially established on February 2, 1842, when the Twenty-fourth Tennessee General Assembly enacted a measure creating the county from portions of Jackson, Overton, Fentress, and White counties.

After the survey was completed by Mounce Gore, the Assembly instructed the commissioners to locate the county seat, to be called "Monticello," near the center of the county. Contending, however, that the formation of Putnam was illegal because it reduced their areas below constitutional limits, Overton and Jackson counties secured an injunction against its continued operation. Putnam officials failed to reply to the complaint, and in the March 1845 term of the Chancery Court at Livingston, Chancellor Bromfield L. Ridley declared Putnam unconstitutionally established and therefore dissolved. The 1854 act reestablishing Putnam was passed after Representative Henderson M. Clements of Jackson County assured his colleagues that a new survey showed that there was sufficient area to form the county. White Plains, near modern Algood, acted as a temporary county seat.

The act specified the "county town" be named "Cookeville" in honor of Richard F. Cooke, who served in the Tennessee Senate from 1851 to 1854, representing at various times Jackson, Fentress, Macon, Overton and White Counties. The act authorized Joshua R. Stone and Green Baker from White County, William Davis and Isaiah Warton from Overton County, John Brown and Austin Morgan from Jackson County, William B. Stokes and Bird S. Rhea from DeKalb County, and Benjamin A. Vaden and Nathan Ward from Smith County, to study the Conner survey and select a spot, not more than two and one-half miles from the center of the county, for the courthouse. The first County Court chose a hilly tract of land, then owned by Charles Crook, for the site.

Putnam County was the site of several saltpeter mines. Saltpeter is the main ingredient of gunpowder and was obtained by leaching the earth from several local caves. Calfkiller Saltpeter Cave, located in the Calfkiller Valley, was a major mining operation, as was Johnson Cave, also located in the Calfkiller Valley. Both caves still contain significant remnants of the mining activity. Several other caves in the county were the site of smaller operations. Most saltpeter mining in Middle Tennessee occurred during the War of 1812 and the Civil War.

== Geography ==
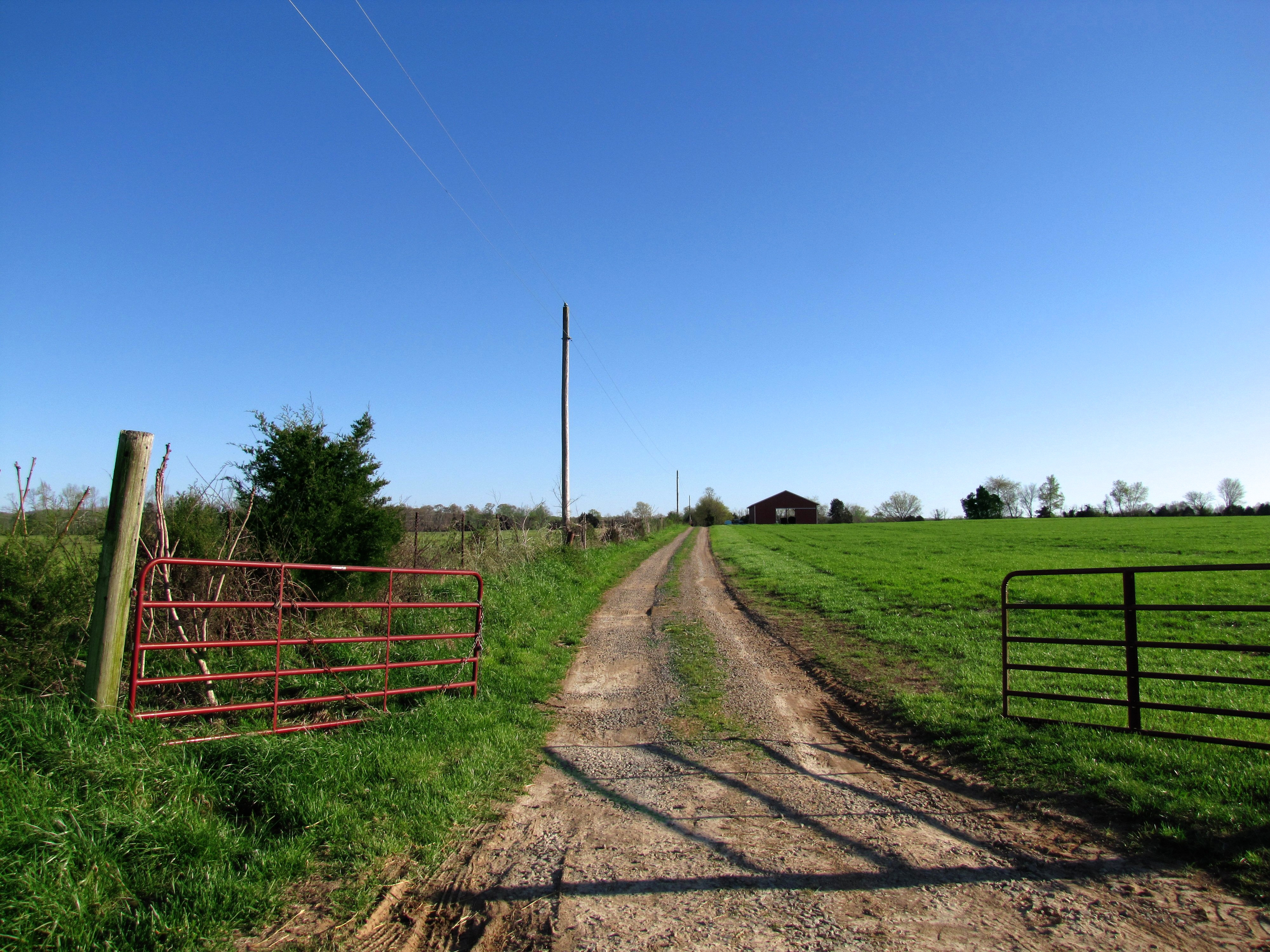
Farm in rural northern Putnam County

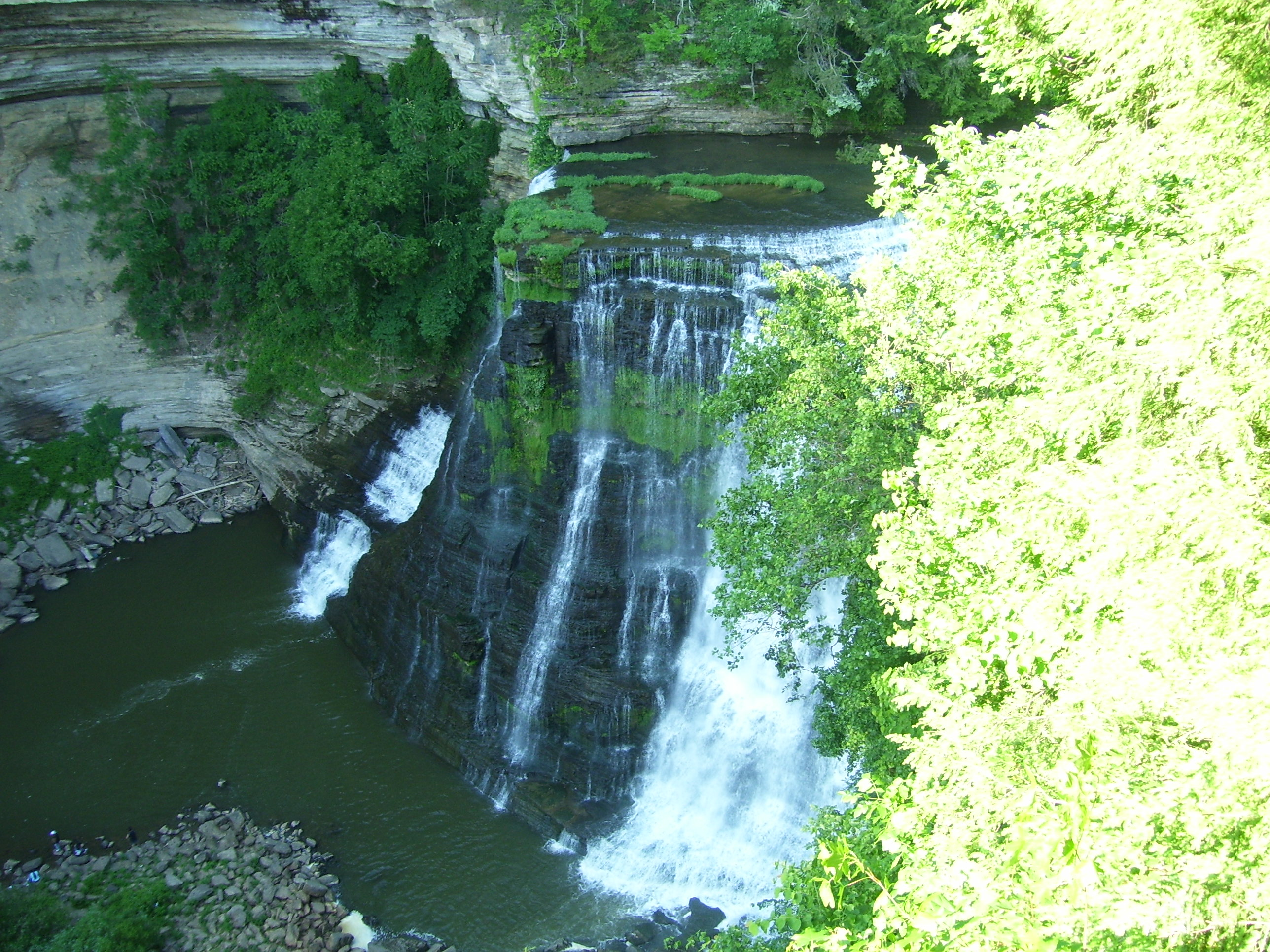
Burgess Falls near the southern border with White County

According to the U.S. Census Bureau, the county has a total area of 403 square miles (1,040 km^{2}), of which 401 square miles (1,040 km^{2}) is land and 1.5 square miles (3.9 km^{2}) (0.4%) is water.

The county is part of the greater Cumberland River watershed. The southern part of the county is drained by tributaries of the Caney Fork, the northeastern part by tributaries of the Obey River, and the north-central and northwestern parts of the county drain into the Cumberland's Cordell Hull Lake impoundment. The sources of two tributaries of the Caney Fork, the Falling Water River and the Calfkiller River, lie near Monterey in the eastern part of the county.

It is impossible to reach Cumberland Cove and Glade Creek without driving through another county.

=== Adjacent counties ===
- Overton County (northeast)
- Fentress County (northeast)
- Cumberland County (east)
- White County (south)
- DeKalb County (southwest)
- Smith County (west)
- Jackson County (northwest)

=== State protected areas ===
- Burgess Falls State Park (part)
- Window Cliffs State Natural Area

== Demographics ==
Historical population
| Census | Pop. | Note | %± |
|---|---|---|---|
| 1860 | 8,558 | | — |
| 1870 | 8,698 | | 1.6% |
| 1880 | 11,501 | | 32.2% |
| 1890 | 13,683 | | 19.0% |
| 1900 | 16,890 | | 23.4% |
| 1910 | 20,023 | | 18.5% |
| 1920 | 22,231 | | 11.0% |
| 1930 | 23,759 | | 6.9% |
| 1940 | 26,250 | | 10.5% |
| 1950 | 29,869 | | 13.8% |
| 1960 | 29,236 | | −2.1% |
| 1970 | 35,487 | | 21.4% |
| 1980 | 47,690 | | 34.4% |
| 1990 | 51,373 | | 7.7% |
| 2000 | 62,315 | | 21.3% |
| 2010 | 72,321 | | 16.1% |
| 2020 | 79,854 | | 10.4% |
| 2025 (est.) | 86,612 | ▲ | 8.5% |
U.S. Decennial Census; 1790-1960 1900-1990; 1990-2000 2010-2014

=== Racial and ethnic composition ===
Putnam County, Tennessee – Racial and ethnic composition Note: the US Census treats Hispanic/Latino as an ethnic category. This table excludes Latinos from the racial categories and assigns them to a separate category. Hispanics/Latinos may be of any race.
| Race / Ethnicity (NH = Non-Hispanic) | Pop 1980 | Pop 1990 | Pop 2000 | Pop 2010 | Pop 2020 | % 1980 | % 1990 | % 2000 | % 2010 | % 2020 |
|---|---|---|---|---|---|---|---|---|---|---|
| White alone (NH) | 46,030 | 49,660 | 58,088 | 65,052 | 66,782 | 96.52% | 96.67% | 93.22% | 89.95% | 83.63% |
| Black or African American alone (NH) | 767 | 873 | 1,039 | 1,421 | 2,161 | 1.61% | 1.70% | 1.67% | 1.96% | 2.71% |
| Native American or Alaska Native alone (NH) | 43 | 79 | 117 | 211 | 161 | 0.09% | 0.15% | 0.19% | 0.29% | 0.20% |
| Asian alone (NH) | 239 | 454 | 574 | 839 | 1,086 | 0.50% | 0.88% | 0.92% | 1.16% | 1.36% |
| Native Hawaiian or Pacific Islander alone (NH) | x | x | 48 | 18 | 33 | x | x | 0.08% | 0.02% | 0.04% |
| Other race alone (NH) | 207 | 13 | 32 | 36 | 179 | 0.43% | 0.03% | 0.05% | 0.05% | 0.22% |
| Mixed race or Multiracial (NH) | x | x | 526 | 886 | 3,196 | x | x | 0.84% | 1.23% | 4.00% |
| Hispanic or Latino (any race) | 404 | 294 | 1,891 | 3,858 | 6,256 | 0.85% | 0.57% | 3.03% | 5.33% | 7.83% |
| Total | 47,690 | 51,373 | 62,315 | 72,321 | 79,854 | 100.00% | 100.00% | 100.00% | 100.00% | 100.00% |

=== 2020 census ===
As of the 2020 census, there were 79,854 people, 32,125 households, and 19,395 families residing in the county. The median age was 36.4 years. 20.9% of residents were under the age of 18 and 17.4% of residents were 65 years of age or older. For every 100 females there were 97.6 males, and for every 100 females age 18 and over there were 96.2 males age 18 and over.

The racial makeup of the county was 85.1% White, 2.7% Black or African American, 0.9% American Indian and Alaska Native, 1.4% Asian, 0.1% Native Hawaiian and Pacific Islander, 4.1% from some other race, and 5.7% from two or more races. Hispanic or Latino residents of any race comprised 7.8% of the population.

61.5% of residents lived in urban areas, while 38.5% lived in rural areas.

Of the 32,125 households recorded in 2020, 27.6% had children under the age of 18 living in them. Of all households, 44.9% were married-couple households, 19.9% were households with a male householder and no spouse or partner present, and 28.0% were households with a female householder and no spouse or partner present. About 29.7% of all households were made up of individuals and 11.7% had someone living alone who was 65 years of age or older.

There were 35,295 housing units, of which 9.0% were vacant. Among occupied housing units, 59.4% were owner-occupied and 40.6% were renter-occupied. The homeowner vacancy rate was 2.1% and the rental vacancy rate was 7.9%.

=== 2010 census ===
As of the census of 2010, there were 72,321 people, 28,930 households, and 18,489 families residing in the county. The population density was 181 people per square mile (70 people/km^{2}). There were 31,882 housing units at an average density of 80 per square mile (31/km^{2}). The racial makeup of the county was 92.0% White, 2.0% Black or African American, 0.4% Native American, 1.2% Asian, 0.1% Pacific Islander, 2.8% from other races, and 1.5% from two or more races. 5.3% of the population were Hispanic or Latino of any race.

There were 28,930 households, out of which 26.3% had children under the age of 18 living with them, 52.70% were married couples living together, 9.80% had a female householder with no husband present, and 34.00% were non-families. 27.10% of all households were made up of individuals, and 10% had someone living alone who was 65 years of age or older. The average household size was 2.41 and the average family size was 2.94.

In the county, the population was spread out, with 22.30% under the age of 18, 14.70% from 18 to 24, 27.90% from 25 to 44, 21.90% from 45 to 64, and 13.20% who were 65 years of age or older. The median age was 34 years. For every 100 females, there were 98.40 males. For every 100 females age 18 and over, there were 96.70 males.

The median income for a household in the county was $33,092, and the median income for a family was $39,553. Males had a median income of $29,243 versus $21,001 for females. The per capita income for the county was $18,892. About 10.30% of families and 16.40% of the population were below the poverty line, including 15.90% of those under age 18 and 16.10% of those age 65 or over.

According to the US Census for 2013 Putnam County has the highest wealth inequality of any United States county with a population of over 65,000.

== Education ==
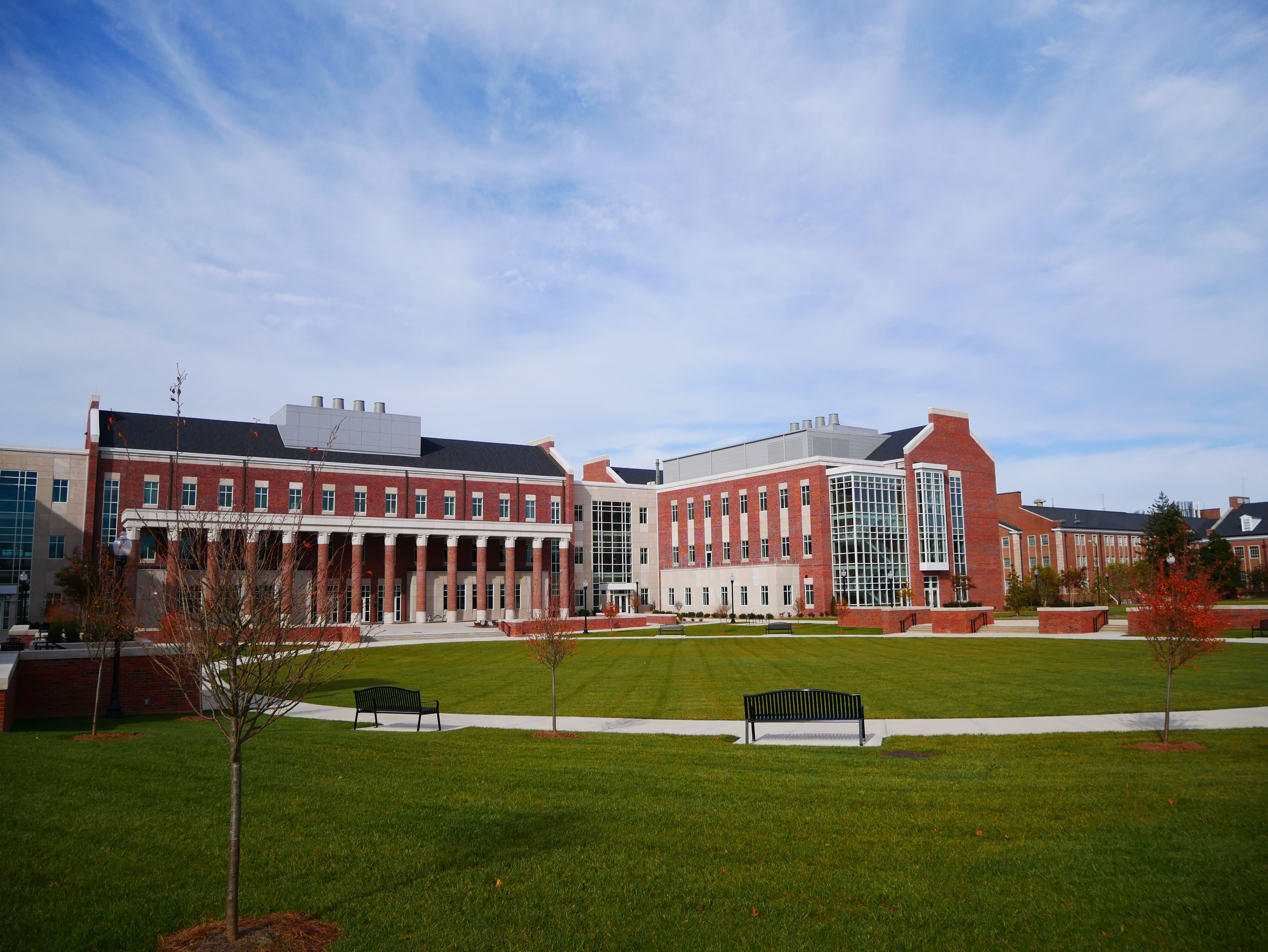
The Laboratory Science Commons at Tennessee Tech

Cookeville, the largest town in Putnam County, is the home of Tennessee Technological University, which is known for its College of Education's undergraduate and graduate programs, its Engineering program's rigor, its College of Business alumni success, and the creativity of the College of Arts and Sciences. The largest college at Tennessee Tech is the College of Education. The university student population of 11,800 comprises one fourth of the resident population of Cookeville.

The Putnam County school system enrolls approximately 12,000 students in 18 schools throughout the county. All schools are accredited. Cookeville High School is the largest non-metropolitan school in the state and is one of only eight high schools in the state to offer the International Baccalaureate program.

== Communities ==
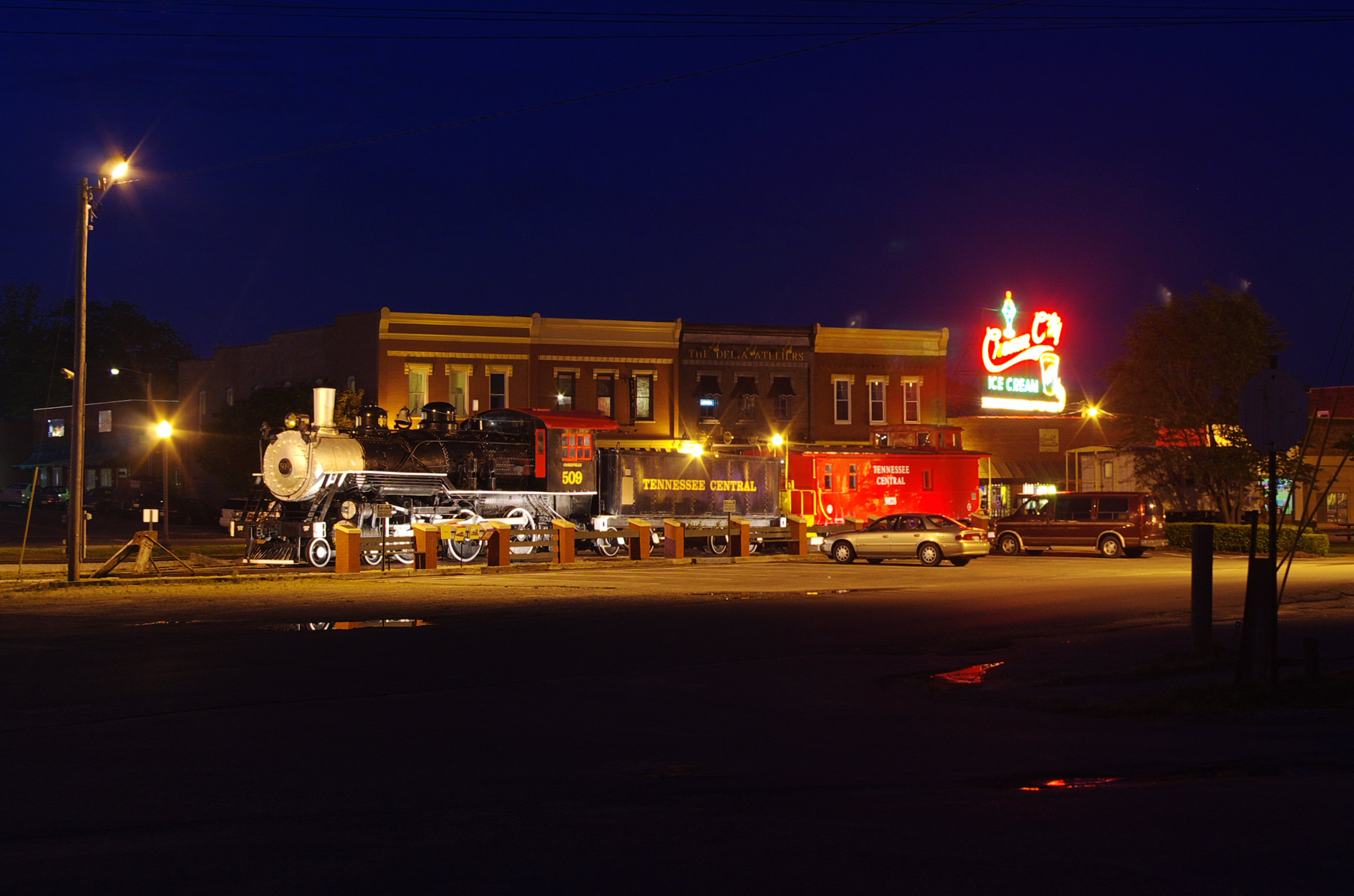
Cookeville

=== Cities ===
- Algood
- Cookeville (county seat)

=== Towns ===
- Baxter
- Monterey

=== Unincorporated communities ===
- Bangham
- Bloomington Springs
- Boma, Tennessee
- Buffalo Valley
- Gentry, Tennessee
- Glade Creek, Tennessee
- Grandview
- Post Oak Estates
- Post Oak
- Shady Grove
- Silver Point
- Winona

== Government and politics ==
=== Local Government ===
Putnam County has twenty-four county commissioners elected to twelve legislative districts, with two members per district.

==== Countywide officials ====
- Mayor: Randy Porter
- Sheriff: Eddie Farris
- County Clerk: Wayne Nabors
- Clerk and Master: Linda Reeder
- Circuit Court Clerk: Jennifer Wilkerson
- Road Supervisor: Randy Jones
- Trustee: Freddie Nelson
- Register of Deeds: John Sanders
- Property Assessor: Steve Pierce
- General Sessions Judges: Steven Qualls and Steven Randolph
- Putnam County Board of Education: Corby King
- Putnam County Attorney: Jeff Jones
- District Attorney General: Bryant Dunaway

=== State and Federal Politics ===
Putnam County is extremely Republican-leaning for an urban county anchored by a college town (Cookeville, the county seat, is home to Tennessee Technological University); formerly a reliable Solid South county, Putnam has voted Republican in nearly every presidential election since Richard Nixon narrowly did so in 1968, making exceptions for Jimmy Carter and Bill Clinton (both of whom are former governors of a neighboring state, namely and respectively Georgia and Arkansas).

Though favorite son Al Gore was just over 2% short of carrying Putnam County in 2000, he would be the last Democratic presidential candidate to come within a single-digit margin of doing so or even win so much as 40% of the county vote. In 2008, John McCain won over 60% of the county's vote. In 2020, Republican Donald Trump easily swept Putnam with over 70% of the county vote, while Democrat Joe Biden racked up less than 28% of the vote. Even the University precinct itself voted for Republican presidential candidates in 2012, 2016, 2020 and 2024, although Phil Bredesen and Karl Dean did carry it handily in the 2018 federal Senate and gubernatorial elections. Despite this, Putnam was one of only four Tennessee counties Biden lost to Bernie Sanders in the Democratic primary in 2020, indicating that the few Democrats left in Putnam County are unusually progressive.

United States presidential election results for Putnam County, Tennessee
| Year | Republican | | Democratic | | Third party(ies) | |
| Year | No. | % | No. | % | No. | % |
|---|---|---|---|---|---|---|
| 1912 | 923 | 29.02% | 1,867 | 58.69% | 391 | 12.29% |
| 1916 | 1,383 | 37.51% | 2,300 | 62.38% | 4 | 0.11% |
| 1920 | 2,132 | 41.58% | 2,996 | 58.42% | 0 | 0.00% |
| 1924 | 1,489 | 37.06% | 2,474 | 61.57% | 55 | 1.37% |
| 1928 | 1,612 | 42.91% | 2,145 | 57.09% | 0 | 0.00% |
| 1932 | 1,281 | 30.40% | 2,911 | 69.08% | 22 | 0.52% |
| 1936 | 1,207 | 31.50% | 2,619 | 68.35% | 6 | 0.16% |
| 1940 | 1,576 | 34.68% | 2,963 | 65.21% | 5 | 0.11% |
| 1944 | 1,770 | 38.83% | 2,788 | 61.17% | 0 | 0.00% |
| 1948 | 1,879 | 33.77% | 3,134 | 56.33% | 551 | 9.90% |
| 1952 | 3,183 | 43.73% | 4,096 | 56.27% | 0 | 0.00% |
| 1956 | 3,492 | 43.63% | 4,481 | 55.98% | 31 | 0.39% |
| 1960 | 4,240 | 48.65% | 4,443 | 50.98% | 32 | 0.37% |
| 1964 | 2,993 | 32.18% | 6,309 | 67.82% | 0 | 0.00% |
| 1968 | 3,693 | 35.83% | 3,541 | 34.36% | 3,073 | 29.81% |
| 1972 | 6,038 | 60.39% | 3,738 | 37.38% | 223 | 2.23% |
| 1976 | 4,079 | 32.10% | 8,485 | 66.77% | 144 | 1.13% |
| 1980 | 6,235 | 42.26% | 8,084 | 54.80% | 434 | 2.94% |
| 1984 | 8,999 | 54.40% | 7,443 | 45.00% | 99 | 0.60% |
| 1988 | 9,547 | 58.62% | 6,606 | 40.56% | 132 | 0.81% |
| 1992 | 7,998 | 37.23% | 10,858 | 50.54% | 2,626 | 12.22% |
| 1996 | 9,093 | 43.53% | 10,047 | 48.10% | 1,748 | 8.37% |
| 2000 | 11,248 | 50.13% | 10,785 | 48.07% | 405 | 1.80% |
| 2004 | 15,637 | 59.14% | 10,566 | 39.96% | 239 | 0.90% |
| 2008 | 17,101 | 62.60% | 9,739 | 35.65% | 476 | 1.74% |
| 2012 | 17,254 | 67.66% | 7,802 | 30.60% | 444 | 1.74% |
| 2016 | 19,002 | 69.83% | 6,851 | 25.18% | 1,359 | 4.99% |
| 2020 | 23,759 | 70.73% | 9,185 | 27.34% | 649 | 1.93% |
| 2024 | 25,554 | 73.14% | 8,991 | 25.73% | 394 | 1.13% |

== See also ==
- National Register of Historic Places listings in Putnam County, Tennessee
- Putnam County, New York
- 2020 Cookeville tornado
