= Cordell Hull Lake =

- Cordell Hull Lake

- Location within Tennessee Location within the United States
- Location: Smith / Jackson / Clay counties, Tennessee, US
- Coordinates: 36°17′24″N 085°56′38″W
- Type: Reservoir
- Primary inflows: Cumberland River
- Primary outflows: Cumberland River
- Catchment area: 8,096 sq mi (20,970 km^{2})
- Basin countries: United States
- Managing agency: United States Army Corps of Engineers
- Built: 1963—1973
- Max. length: 72 mi (116 km)
- Surface area: 11,960 acres (48.4 km^{2})
- Average depth: 20 ft (6.1 m)
- Max. depth: 90 ft (27 m)
- Water volume: 310,900 acre⋅ft (0.3835 km^{3})
- Shore length^{1}: 381 mi (613 km)
- Surface elevation: 504 ft (154 m)
- ^{1} Shore length is not a well-defined measure.

Cordell Hull Lake is a lake in the Cumberland River in north-central Tennessee, about 40 miles (64 km) east of Nashville, in the vicinity of Carthage. It covers approximately 12,000 acres (49 km^{2}).

The lake is impounded by Cordell Hull Dam, which was built by the United States Army Corps of Engineers between May 1963 and November 1973 for navigation, hydroelectric power generation, and recreation. The dam is a concrete and earthen gravity structure, 87 feet (27 m) high (above streambed), with a generator capacity of 100 megawatts. It impounds 259,100 acre-feet (0.3196 km^{3}) at normal maximum pool, with a maximum flood storage of 310,900 acre-feet (0.3835 km^{3}).

The dam and lake are named for Cordell Hull, former United States Secretary of State.
