= National Register of Historic Places listings in Franklin County, Tennessee =

Location of Franklin County in Tennessee

This is a list of the National Register of Historic Places listings in Franklin County, Tennessee.

This is intended to be a complete list of the properties and districts on the National Register of Historic Places in Franklin County, Tennessee, United States. Latitude and longitude coordinates are provided for many National Register properties and districts; these locations may be seen together in a map.

There are 22 properties and districts listed on the National Register in the county. Three other previously listed sites have been removed.

Contents: Counties in Tennessee
Anderson – Bedford – Benton – Bledsoe – Blount – Bradley – Campbell – Cannon – Carroll – Carter – Cheatham – Chester – Claiborne – Clay – Cocke – Coffee – Crockett – Cumberland – Davidson – Decatur – DeKalb – Dickson – Dyer – Fayette – Fentress – Franklin – Gibson – Giles – Grainger – Greene – Grundy – Hamblen – Hamilton – Hancock – Hardeman – Hardin – Hawkins – Haywood – Henderson – Henry – Hickman – Houston – Humphreys – Jackson – Jefferson – Johnson – Knox – Lake – Lauderdale – Lawrence – Lewis – Lincoln – Loudon – Macon – Madison – Marion – Marshall – Maury – McMinn – McNairy – Meigs – Monroe – Montgomery – Moore – Morgan – Obion – Overton – Perry – Pickett – Polk – Putnam – Rhea – Roane – Robertson – Rutherford – Scott – Sequatchie – Sevier – Shelby – Smith – Stewart – Sullivan – Sumner – Tipton – Trousdale – Unicoi – Union – Van Buren – Warren – Washington – Wayne – Weakley – White – Williamson – Wilson

This National Park Service list is complete through NPS recent listings posted May 1, 2026.

== Current listings ==
	Name on the Register	Image	Date listed	Location	City or town	Description
1	Asia School	Asia School	July 13, 2011 (#11000456)	525 Asia Rd. 35°14′38″N 86°05′33″W	Asia	
2	Bank of Winchester Building	Bank of Winchester Building	May 23, 1978 (#78002589)	1st Ave. 35°11′09″N 86°06′44″W	Winchester	Built in 1899; also called the Farmers National Bank Building.
3	Cowan Depot	Cowan Depot	November 24, 1978 (#78002588)	Front St. 35°09′49″N 86°00′36″W	Cowan	Now the Cowan Railroad Museum
4	Cumberland Mountain Tunnel	Cumberland Mountain Tunnel	August 22, 1977 (#77001270)	Southeast of Cowan; 35°09′10″N 85°58′32″W	Cowan	
5	Estill-Fite House	Estill-Fite House	March 23, 1979 (#79002429)	114 Sharp Springs Rd. 35°11′27″N 86°06′28″W	Winchester	
6	Falls Mill	Falls Mill	February 23, 1972 (#72001240)	1 mile (1.6 km) off U.S. Route 64; 35°05′56″N 86°15′41″W	Huntland	
7	Falls Mills Historic District	Falls Mills Historic District	July 9, 1987 (#87001158)	Old Salem-Lexie and Falls Mill Rds. 35°05′58″N 86°15′39″W	Huntland	
8	Franklin County Courthouse	Franklin County Courthouse	March 30, 1995 (#95000345)	Public Sq. 35°11′11″N 86°06′43″W	Winchester	Built in 1936; designed by Nashville-based architectural firm Marr & Holman.
9	Franklin County Jail	Franklin County Jail	March 26, 1979 (#79002430)	Decherd Boulevard; 35°11′16″N 86°06′34″W	Winchester	
10	Isaac Gray House		November 21, 1976 (#76001776)	Southwest of Winchester off U.S. Route 64; 35°06′02″N 86°15′25″W	Winchester	
11	Haynes House	Haynes House	April 28, 2005 (#05000359)	519 Spring St. 35°12′44″N 86°04′16″W	Decherd	Nomination form:
12	Hunt-Moore House	Hunt-Moore House	November 9, 2005 (#05001223)	518 Main St. 35°03′18″N 86°16′13″W	Huntland	
13	R.N. Mann House	R.N. Mann House	September 22, 1977 (#77001271)	North of Old Salem off U.S. Route 64; 35°06′03″N 86°15′25″W	Old Salem	Nomination form:
14	Saint Margaret Mary Catholic Mission		July 10, 2017 (#100001305)	9458 Old Alto Hwy. 35°16′12″N 85°57′29″W	Alto	
15	Sewanee Fire Lookout Tower	Sewanee Fire Lookout Tower	March 31, 2015 (#15000116)	310 Fire Tower Rd. 35°13′11″N 85°53′18″W	Sewanee	State-owned and opened to the public as of 2016 (canopy off limits).
16	Shook-Vanzant Farm		July 31, 1998 (#98000954)	210 Moore Farm Rd. 35°08′38″N 86°08′47″W	Winchester	
17	Peter Simmons House		August 16, 1977 (#77001272)	11 miles (18 km) southwest of Winchester on U.S. Route 64; 35°04′46″N 86°15′29″W	Winchester	
18	Tims Ford Hydroelectric Project	Tims Ford Hydroelectric Project	August 11, 2017 (#100001465)	461 Powerhouse Rd. 35°11′49″N 86°16′43″W	Winchester	
19	Townsend School	Townsend School	April 23, 2024 (#100010260)	913 S. Sheperd Street; 35°10′31″N 86°06′40″W	Winchester	
20	Trinity Episcopal Church	Trinity Episcopal Church	November 25, 1980 (#80003796)	213 1st Ave., NW. 35°11′06″N 86°06′50″W	Winchester	Congregation established in 1859; church constructed in the early 1870s.
21	Valentine Square	Valentine Square	November 8, 1984 (#84000375)	111 N. Cedar St. 35°11′04″N 86°06′56″W	Winchester	Built in 1899 by Tullahoma builder Franklin Pierce McDowell for local banker Smith Morgan Alexander (1849–1932).
22	Zaugg Bank Barn		December 18, 1973 (#73001764)	Southeast of Belvidere off U.S. Route 64; Additional documentation approved (listed July 17, 2012): 831 Crawford Ln., Belvidere vicinity 35°06′49″N 86°09′39″W	Belvidere	

== Former listings ==
	Name on the Register	Image	Date listed	Date removed	Location	City or town	Description
1	Circular Barn at Cloverdale Farm		December 12, 1976 (#76001774)	July 2, 1979	S of Belvidere off U.S. 64	Belvidere vicinity	Destroyed by fire.
2	Hundred Oaks Castle	Hundred Oaks Castle	May 28, 1975 (#75001753)	November 16, 1994	Oak Street and US Highway 64	Winchester	former home of Arthur Marks, son of Governor Albert S. Marks. Significantly damaged in a fire in 1990. Delisted between June 5, 1990 and December 20, 1990, but reinstated.
3	Knies Blacksmith Shop		April 11, 1973 (#73001765)	January 29, 2013	118 N. Jefferson St.	Winchester	
4	Col. James Lewis House		November 21, 1976 (#76001775)	May 16, 1989	East of Decherd on Greenhaw Rd.	Decherd vicinity	Destroyed by fire on April 12, 1989.

== See also ==
- List of National Historic Landmarks in Tennessee
- National Register of Historic Places listings in Tennessee
