= National Register of Historic Places listings in Smith County, Tennessee =

Location of Smith County in Tennessee

This is a list of the National Register of Historic Places listings in Smith County, Tennessee.

This is intended to be a complete list of the properties and districts on the National Register of Historic Places in Smith County, Tennessee, United States. Latitude and longitude coordinates are provided for many National Register properties and districts; these locations may be seen together in a map.

There are 13 properties and districts listed on the National Register in the county.

Contents: Counties in Tennessee
Anderson – Bedford – Benton – Bledsoe – Blount – Bradley – Campbell – Cannon – Carroll – Carter – Cheatham – Chester – Claiborne – Clay – Cocke – Coffee – Crockett – Cumberland – Davidson – Decatur – DeKalb – Dickson – Dyer – Fayette – Fentress – Franklin – Gibson – Giles – Grainger – Greene – Grundy – Hamblen – Hamilton – Hancock – Hardeman – Hardin – Hawkins – Haywood – Henderson – Henry – Hickman – Houston – Humphreys – Jackson – Jefferson – Johnson – Knox – Lake – Lauderdale – Lawrence – Lewis – Lincoln – Loudon – Macon – Madison – Marion – Marshall – Maury – McMinn – McNairy – Meigs – Monroe – Montgomery – Moore – Morgan – Obion – Overton – Perry – Pickett – Polk – Putnam – Rhea – Roane – Robertson – Rutherford – Scott – Sequatchie – Sevier – Shelby – Smith – Stewart – Sullivan – Sumner – Tipton – Trousdale – Unicoi – Union – Van Buren – Warren – Washington – Wayne – Weakley – White – Williamson – Wilson

This National Park Service list is complete through NPS recent listings posted May 1, 2026.

== Current listings ==
| | Name on the Register | Image | Date listed | Location | City or town | Description |
|---|---|---|---|---|---|---|
| 1 | Battery Knob Earthworks | Battery Knob Earthworks | November 14, 2003 (#03001158) | Approximately ½ mile north of Carthage; 36°16′05″N 85°56′55″W | Carthage vicinity | Civil War-era Union artillery battery earthworks |
| 2 | James Bradley House | James Bradley House | September 18, 1978 (#78002637) | Southeast of Dixon Springs off State Route 25; 36°20′36″N 86°02′35″W | Dixon Springs vicinity | Still retains most of its original exterior |
| 3 | Carthage United Methodist Church | Carthage United Methodist Church | July 5, 1985 (#85001487) | 608 Main St N #1212; 36°15′19″N 85°57′04″W | Carthage | Gothic Revival structure built in 1889; congregation established in 1808 |
| 4 | Cullum Mansion | Cullum Mansion | January 4, 1983 (#83003068) | 202 Cullum St; 36°15′19″N 85°56′51″W | Carthage | Greek Revival-style antebellum mansion |
| 5 | Davis-Hull House | Davis-Hull House | January 4, 1983 (#83003069) | 1004 N. Main St. 36°15′35″N 85°57′06″W | Carthage | Victorian-style house that once belonged to William Hull, father of Secretary of State Cordell Hull |
| 6 | Dixon Springs District | Dixon Springs District | February 10, 1975 (#75001788) | 1.75 miles northeast of the Cumberland River; 36°21′32″N 86°03′09″W | Dixon Springs | |
| 7 | Dixona | Dixona | July 5, 1973 (#73001832) | 1004 Dixon Springs Hwy; 36°21′44″N 86°03′34″W | Dixon Springs | Originally a log structure; wings and decks have been added over the years |
| 8 | Fite-Williams-Ligon House | Fite-Williams-Ligon House | July 17, 2003 (#03000663) | 212 Fite Ave., W. 36°15′15″N 85°57′13″W | Carthage | |
| 9 | Fortified Town at the Mouth of Dixon Creek-Beasley Mounds | | July 16, 2010 (#10000465) | Triangle at the point of the confluence of Dixon Creek and the Cumberland River; 36°20′33″N 86°04′37″W | Dixon Springs vicinity | Mississippian Cultural Resources of the Central Basin (AD 900–1450) MPS |
| 10 | Cordell Hull Bridge | Cordell Hull Bridge | November 20, 2009 (#09000951) | Cordell Hull Bridge St. over the Cumberland River; 36°14′55″N 85°57′17″W | Carthage | Parker Truss bridge built in 1936 |
| 11 | Moss Mounds | | June 5, 2015 (#15000332) | Address Restricted | Elmwood vicinity | |
| 12 | Rome Ferry | Rome Ferry | December 24, 1986 (#86003477) | U.S. Route 70 at the Cumberland River; 36°15′50″N 86°04′15″W | Rome | The ruins of an early twentieth-century ferry tug |
| 13 | Smith County Courthouse | Smith County Courthouse | April 17, 1979 (#79002483) | Court Sq. 36°15′06″N 85°57′09″W | Carthage | |

== See also ==
- List of National Historic Landmarks in Tennessee
- National Register of Historic Places listings in Tennessee
