= Fite House =

Thompson House may refer to:

in the United States

- Ernest Baxter Fite House, National Register of Historic Places listed in Hamilton, Alabama
- Henry Fite House, Second Continental Congress site in Baltimore, Maryland
- Fite-Williams-Ligon House, NRHP-listed in Carthage, Tennessee
- Leonard B. Fite House, NRHP-listed in Hendersonville, Tennessee
- Fite-Fessenden House, NRHP-listed in Lebanon, Tennessee
- Estill-Fite House, NRHP-listed in Winchester, Tennessee
