= Smith County Courthouse (Tennessee) =

- U.S. National Register of Historic Places
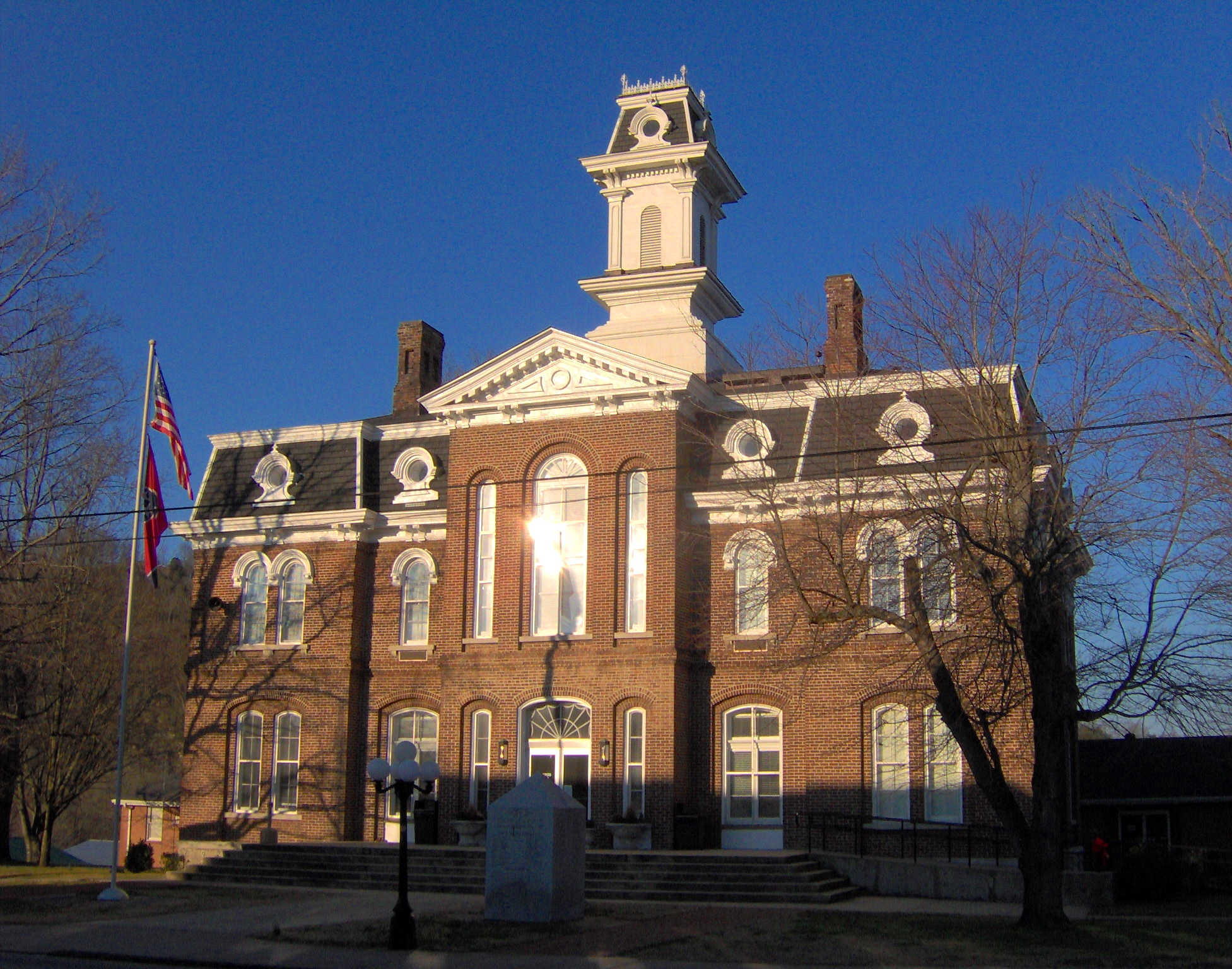
- The Smith County Courthouse in 2008

- Location within Tennessee
- Interactive map showing the location of Smith County Courthouse
- Location: Court Square, Main Street between 2nd and 3rd, Carthage, Tennessee
- Coordinates: 36°15′05.9″N 85°57′08.6″W
- Area: 2 acres (0.81 ha)
- Built: 1877
- Architect: Henry C. Jackson
- Architectural style: Second Empire
- NRHP reference No.: 79002483
- Added to NRHP: April 17, 1979

The Smith County Courthouse is a historic courthouse in Carthage, Tennessee, United States.

== Location ==
The courthouse is located on the Court Square in Carthage, a small town in Smith County, Tennessee, United States. It overlooks the Cumberland River.

== History ==
It was designed by architect Henry C. Jackson in the Second Empire architectural style. It has a mansard roof with a cupola.

== Architectural significance ==
It has been listed on the National Register of Historic Places since April 17, 1979.
