= Cullum Mansion =

Historic house in Tennessee, United States

- U.S. National Register of Historic Places
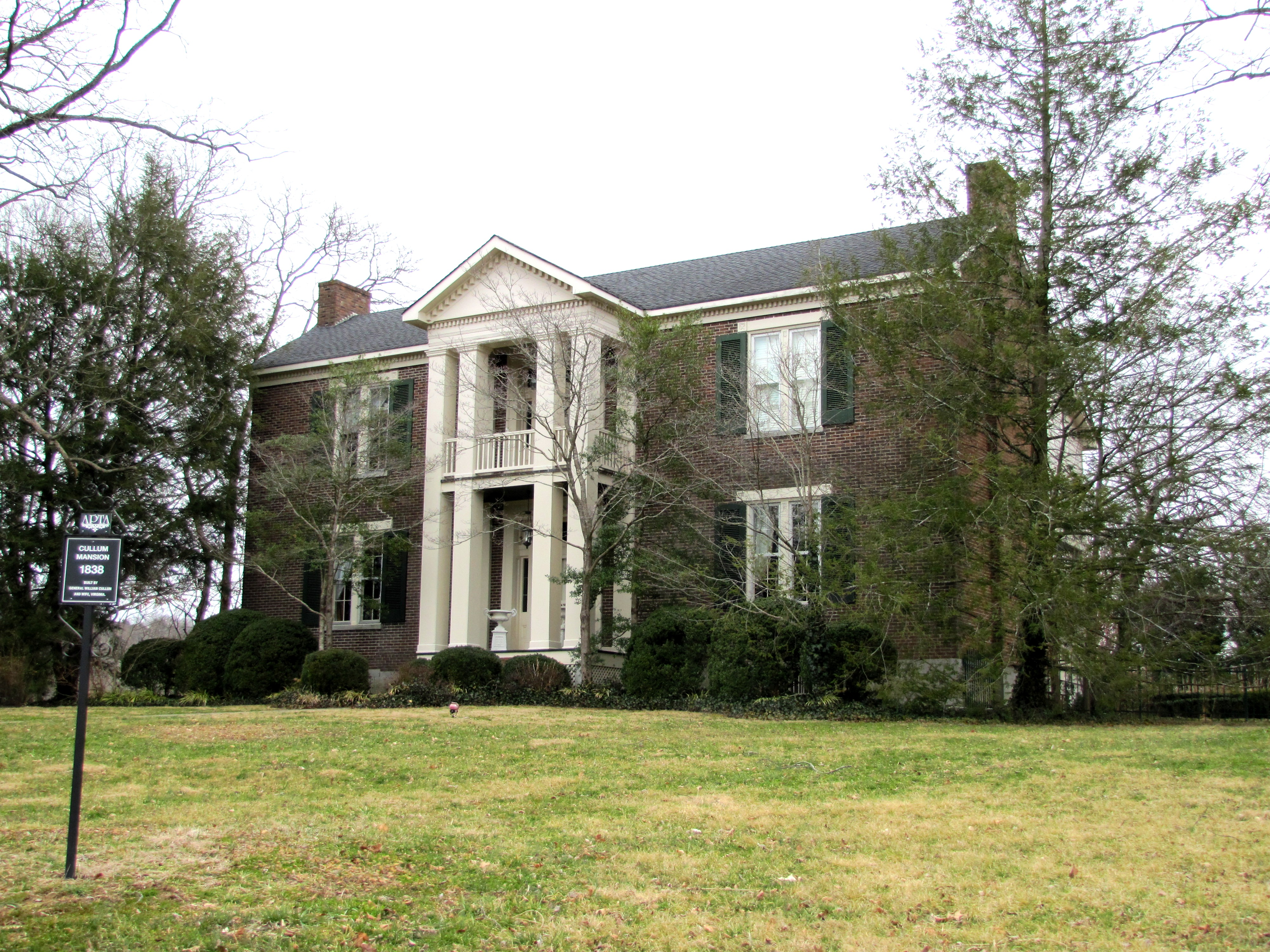
- The Cullum Mansion in 2010

- Location within Tennessee Location within the United States
- Location: 609 Cullum Street, Carthage, Tennessee, U.S.
- Coordinates: 36°15′19″N 85°56′51″W
- Area: 1 acre (0.40 ha)
- Built: 1848
- Architectural style: Greek Revival
- NRHP reference No.: 83003068
- Added to NRHP: January 4, 1983

The Cullum Mansion is a historic mansion in Carthage, Tennessee.

== Location ==
The mansion is located at 202 Cullum Street in Carthage, a small town in Smith County, Tennessee. It sits upon a hill close to the main street of Carthage.

== History ==
The mansion was completed in 1848 and designed in the Greek Revival architectural style. It was built for William Cullom [Cullum], who served in the United States House of Representatives from 1851 to 1855 as a member of the Whig Party.

Judge J. T. Fisher purchased the mansion in 1898. It was then acquired by Glen Womack in 1925, and by W. W. Chambers in 1926. Four decades later, in 1966, it was purchased by Chesley Richardson, followed by Joel F. Maggart.

== Architectural significance ==
It has been listed on the National Register of Historic Places since January 4, 1983.
