= Davis-Hull House =

Historic house in Tennessee, United States

- Davis-Hull Mansion
- U.S. National Register of Historic Places
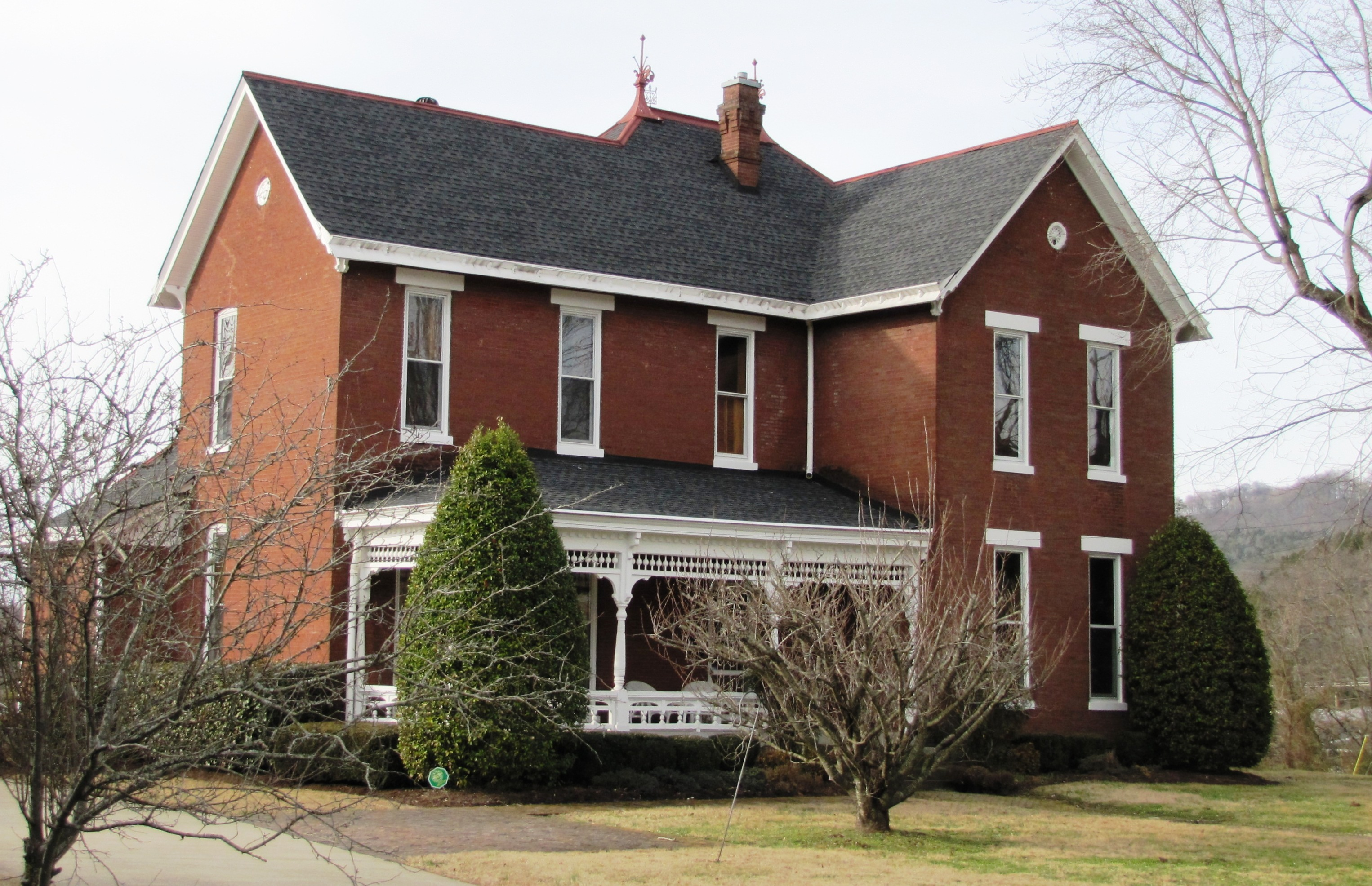
- The Davis-Hull Mansion in 2010

- Location within Tennessee Location within the United States
- Location: 1004 North Main Street, Carthage, Tennessee
- Coordinates: 36.25964°N 85.95165°W
- Area: 1.6 acres (0.65 ha)
- Built: 1889
- Architect: Calvin Davis
- Architectural style: Late Victorian
- NRHP reference No.: 83003069
- Added to NRHP: January 4, 1983

The Davis-Hull House is a historic house located at 1004 North Main Street in Carthage, Tennessee. It was listed on the National Register of Historic Places on January 4, 1983.

== Description and history ==
The land originally belonged to E. L. Gardenshire. In 1889, it was sold to Calvin N. Davis, who served in the Confederate States Army during the Civil War and later worked as a merchant in Nashville, Tennessee. In 1889, Davis moved to Carthage with his wife and eight children. In Carthage, he was a co-founder of the Rewoda Milling Company and the Carthage Tobacco Works.

Shortly after acquiring the land in 1889, Davis built this two-storey house. It was designed in the Victorian architectural style.

The house was purchased by T. P. Bridges in 1900. Four years later, in 1904, it was acquired by J. H. Officer. Officer rented out rooms to Professor W. T. Call and his students at the adjacent Joseph W. Allen School. (The school building was later demolished.)

In 1906, the house was purchased by William Hull, the father of Cordell Hull, who served as the United States Secretary of State from 1933 to 1944. However, Secretary Hull only lived there in 1907.

By 1914, the house was sold to Arthur H. Hackett. It was purchased by Gladys Hackett Moore in 1920. It was then acquired by his son in 1976. On 11/13/2019 the house was purchased by Snowcreek Properties, LLC located in Carthage, Tennessee.
