= Carthage United Methodist Church =

Historic church in Tennessee, United States

- U.S. National Register of Historic Places
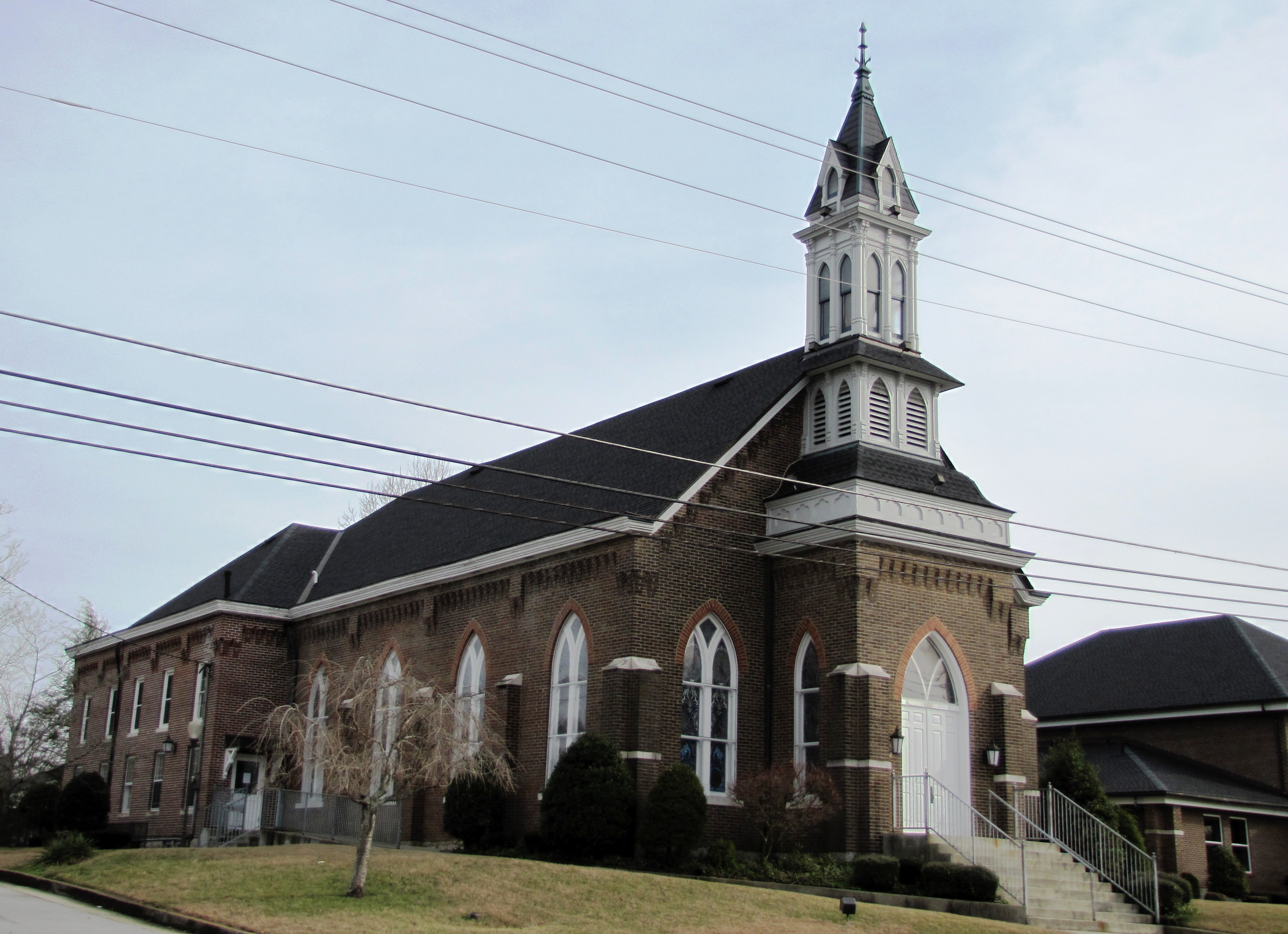
- The Carthage United Methodist Church in 2010

- Location within Tennessee Location within the United States
- Location: 609 South Main Street, Carthage, Tennessee, U.S.
- Coordinates: 36°15′19″N 85°57′4″W
- Area: less than one acre
- Built: 1889
- Architectural style: Gothic Revival
- NRHP reference No.: 85001487
- Added to NRHP: July 5, 1985

The Carthage United Methodist Church is a historic church in Carthage, Tennessee, USA.

== Location ==
The church is located at 609 Main Street in Carthage, a small town in Smith County, Tennessee, United States.

== History ==
The church building was completed in 1889. It was designed in the Gothic Revival architectural style. It was built for the Carthage United Methodist Church congregation as its fourth church building. The congregation was established in 1808.

== Architectural significance ==
It has been listed on the National Register of Historic Places since July 5, 1985, as a significant example of Gothic Revival Church architecture in Carthage. The church includes a bell town and stained glass lancet windows.
