= James Bradley House =

Historic house in Tennessee, United States

- U.S. National Register of Historic Places
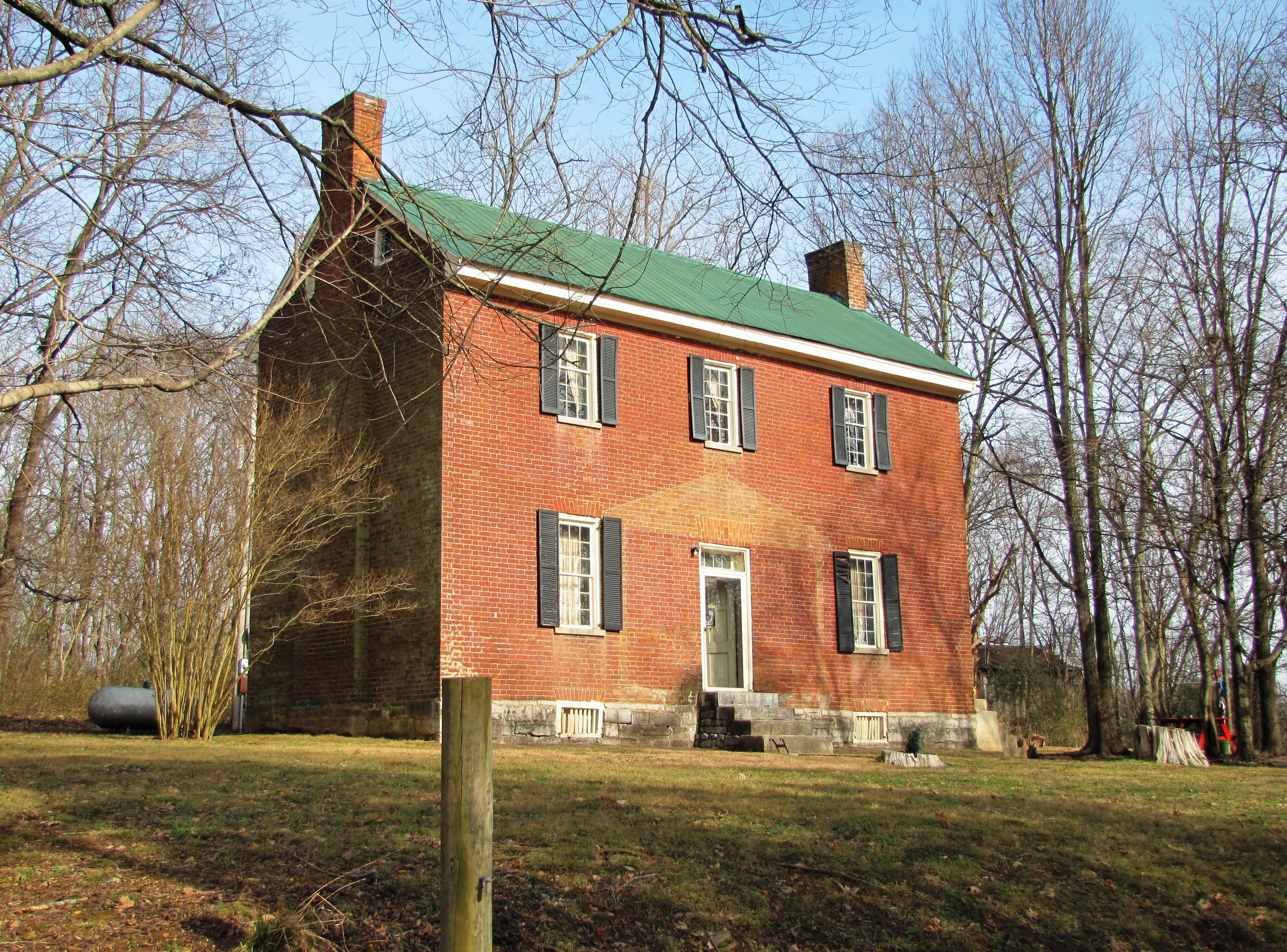
- The James Bradley House in 2010

- Location within Tennessee Location within the United States
- Location: Lovers Lane, Dixon Springs, Tennessee, U.S.
- Coordinates: 36°20′36″N 86°2′35″W
- Area: 0.3 acres (0.12 ha)
- Built: c. 1805
- Architectural style: Federal
- NRHP reference No.: 78002637
- Added to NRHP: September 18, 1978

The James Bradley House is a historic house on a Southern plantation in Dixon Springs, Tennessee, United States.

== Location ==
The house is located on Lovers Lane near Dixon Springs, a small town in Smith County, Tennessee.

== History ==
The 367-acree plantation belonged to William Sanders, a planter. In the 1790s, James Bradley, a veteran of the American Revolutionary War, moved from Caswell County, North Carolina to Smith County, Tennessee, and purchased the plantation from Sanders. Bradley owned 55 African slaves.

By 1805, Bradley commissioned the construction of this two-story house in the Federal architectural style. It was built with red bricks, with the green gable roof made with limestone. The roof has a chimney on each side.

== Architectural significance ==
It has been listed on the National Register of Historic Places since September 18, 1978.

== See also ==
- National Register of Historic Places listings in Smith County, Tennessee
