= Falls Mill =

- U.S. National Register of Historic Places
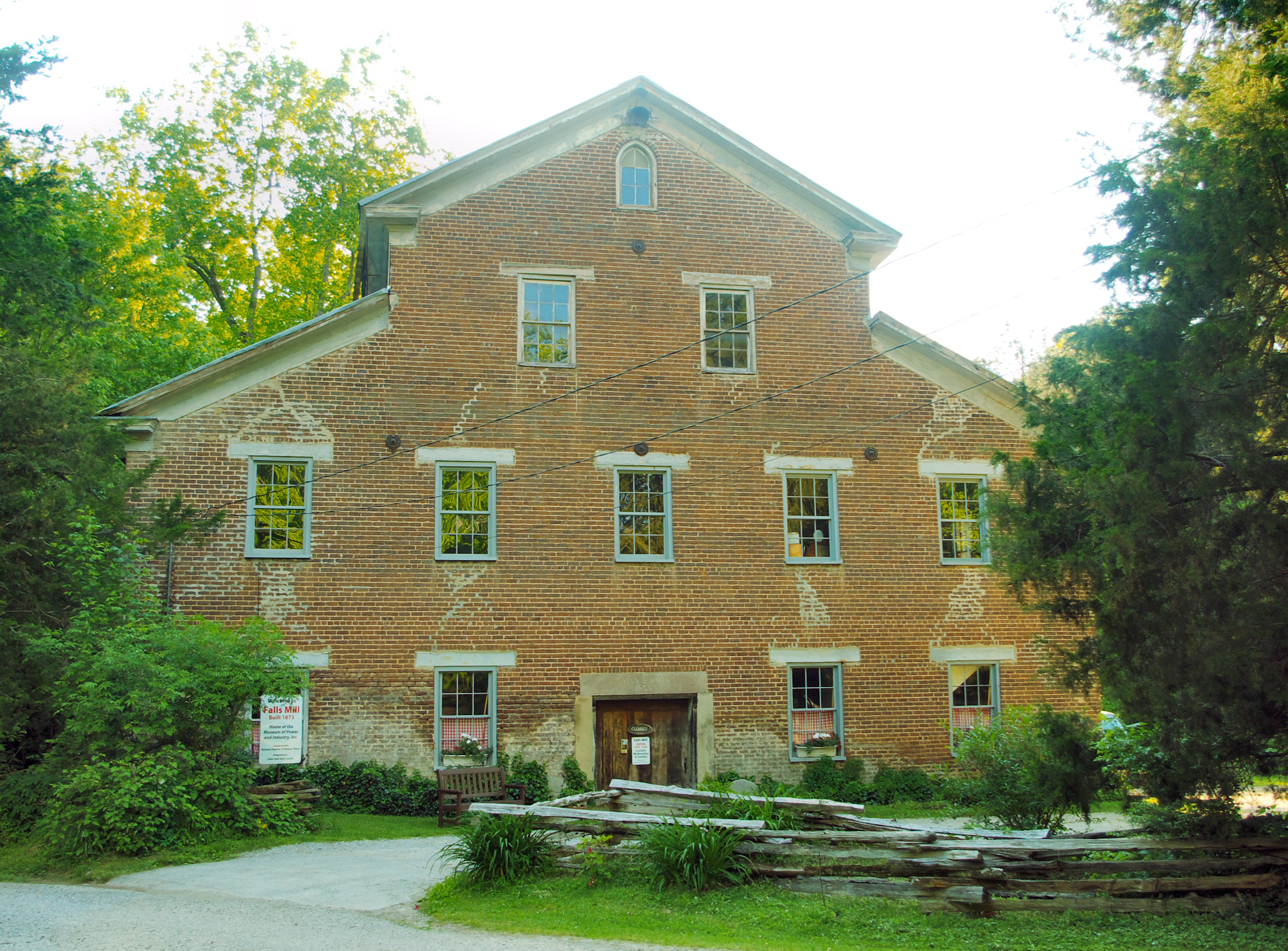
- Falls Mill (2015)

- Location within Tennessee Location within the United States
- Location: 134 Falls Mill Rd; Belvidere, Tennessee
- Coordinates: 35°5′54″N 86°15′41″W
- Area: 8 acres (3.2 ha)
- Built: 1873
- NRHP reference No.: 72001240
- Added to NRHP: February 23, 1972

Falls Mill is a rural historic textile factory. It is located southwest of Belvidere and north of Huntland in the state of Tennessee in United States. It was built in 1873. It has been listed on the National Register of Historic Places since February 23, 1972.

The mill is now a museum that is also known as the Museum of Power and Industry at Falls Mill. Displays include antique machinery, historic photos, mill stones, broom-making equipment, a printing press, and a dog-powered butter churn. There is a weaving exhibit room with hand looms, spinning wheels and a collection of 19th-century power looms and wool carding machines. The owners live on site adjacent to the mill in a 19th-century building that was moved to the current site by the owners. There is a small area to walk around by the river that powers the mill along with picnic tables.

== See also ==
- National Register of Historic Places listings in Franklin County, Tennessee
