= Hunt-Moore House =

- Hunt--Moore House
- U.S. National Register of Historic Places
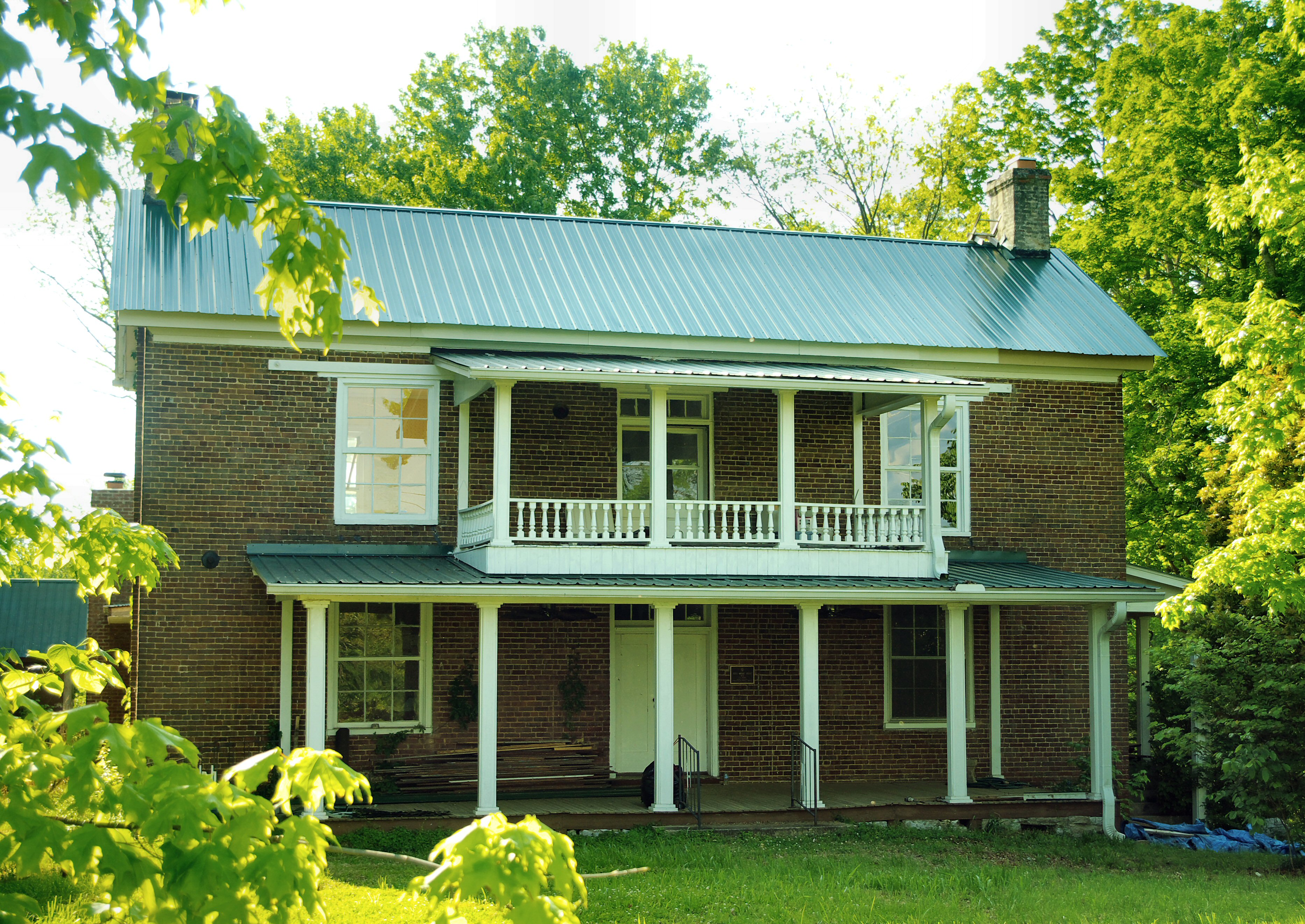
- The Hunt-Moore House in 2015

- Location within Tennessee Location within the United States
- Location: 518 Main Street, Huntland, Tennessee
- Coordinates: 35°03′18″N 86°16′13″W
- Area: 2.4 acres (0.97 ha)
- Built: 1852
- Architectural style: Federal, Greek Revival
- NRHP reference No.: 05001223
- Added to NRHP: November 9, 2005

The Hunt-Moore House is a historic house in Huntland, Tennessee, U.S..

== History ==
The house was built in 1852 by slaves for Clinton Armstrong Hunt and his wife, Tapheneas Cooke Lipscomb. Hunt's grandfather, John Hunt, was the namesake of Huntsville, Alabama, and his nephew, David Lipscomb, was the Nashville Bible School, later known as Lipscomb University.

The house was inherited by Hunt's daughter Anne and her husband, Horatio Richardson Moore. During the American Civil War of 1861–1865, Moore served in the Confederate States Army. He served in the Tennessee General Assembly from 1873 to 1875. One of their children, Hugh Benton Moore, and his wife Helen Edmunds Moore, developed Texas City, Texas, where he built the Col. Hugh B. and Helen Moore House, listed on the NRHP. The Hunt-Moore House was inherited by their other children.

The house has been listed on the National Register of Historic Places since November 9, 2005.
