= Valentine Square =

- U.S. National Register of Historic Places
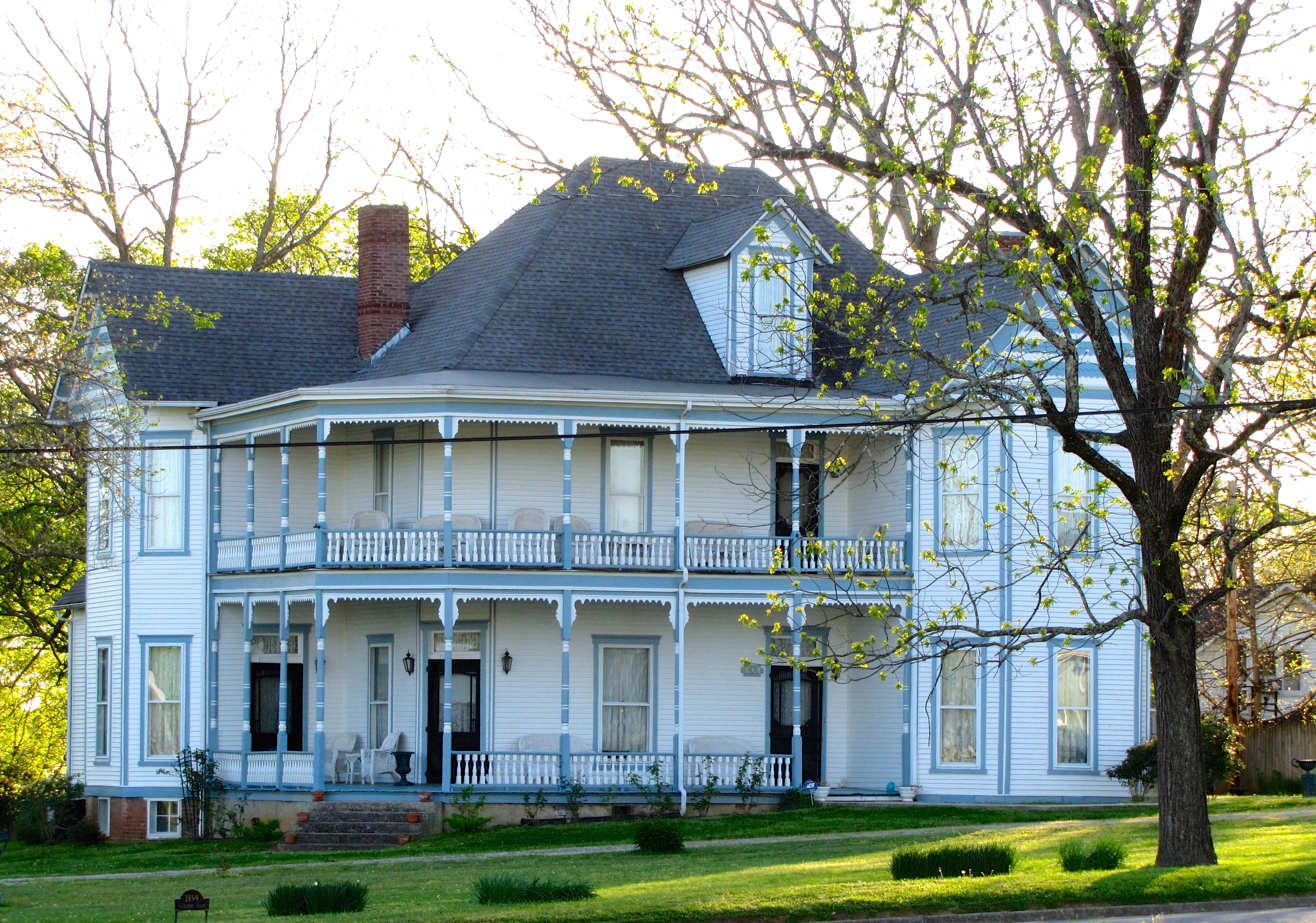
- Location: 111 North Cedar Street, Winchester, Tennessee
- Area: 1.9 acres (0.77 ha)
- Built: 1899
- Architectural style: Stick/eastlake
- NRHP reference No.: 84000375
- Added to NRHP: November 8, 1984

Valentine Square, also known as the Alexander-Collins House, is a historic house in Winchester, Tennessee, U.S.. It was built in 1899 by Franklin Pierce McDowell for Smith Morgan Alexander, a banker who had served in the Confederate States Army during the American Civil War. It was named Valentine Square for his daughter.

The house was designed in the Stick/eastlake architectural style. It has been listed on the National Register of Historic Places since November 8, 1984.
