= Peter Simmons House =

- U.S. National Register of Historic Places
- Location within Tennessee Location within the United States
- Nearest city: Winchester, Tennessee
- Coordinates: 35°04′46″N 86°15′29″W
- Area: 1.5 acres (0.61 ha)
- Built: 1820
- Built by: Simmons, Peter
- NRHP reference No.: 77001272
- Added to NRHP: August 16, 1977

The Peter Simmons House is a historic house near Winchester, Tennessee, U.S. It was built in 1820 for Peter Simmons, a settler, planter, and cotton dealer. The house was built on a 400-acre plantation. Simmons grew cotton, and it was sold in New Orleans.

The house has been listed on the National Register of Historic Places since August 16, 1977.
