= Shook-Vanzant Farm =

- Shook--Vanzant Farm
- U.S. National Register of Historic Places
- Nearest city: Winchester, Tennessee
- Area: 400 acres (160 ha)
- Built: 1893
- Architectural style: Queen Anne
- MPS: Historic Family Farms in Middle Tennessee MPS
- NRHP reference No.: 98000954
- Added to NRHP: July 31, 1998

The Shook-Vanzant Farm, also known as the Moore Farm, is a historic farmhouse near Winchester, Tennessee, U.S. It was built in 1893 for Nathan Shook. The property includes several other buildings, including two houses, several barns, and a garage. It was later acquired by the Vanzant family, whose descendants are the Moore family.

The house was designed in the Queen Anne architectural style. It has been listed on the National Register of Historic Places since July 31, 1998.
