= Fite-Williams-Ligon House =

Historic house in Tennessee, United States

- U.S. National Register of Historic Places
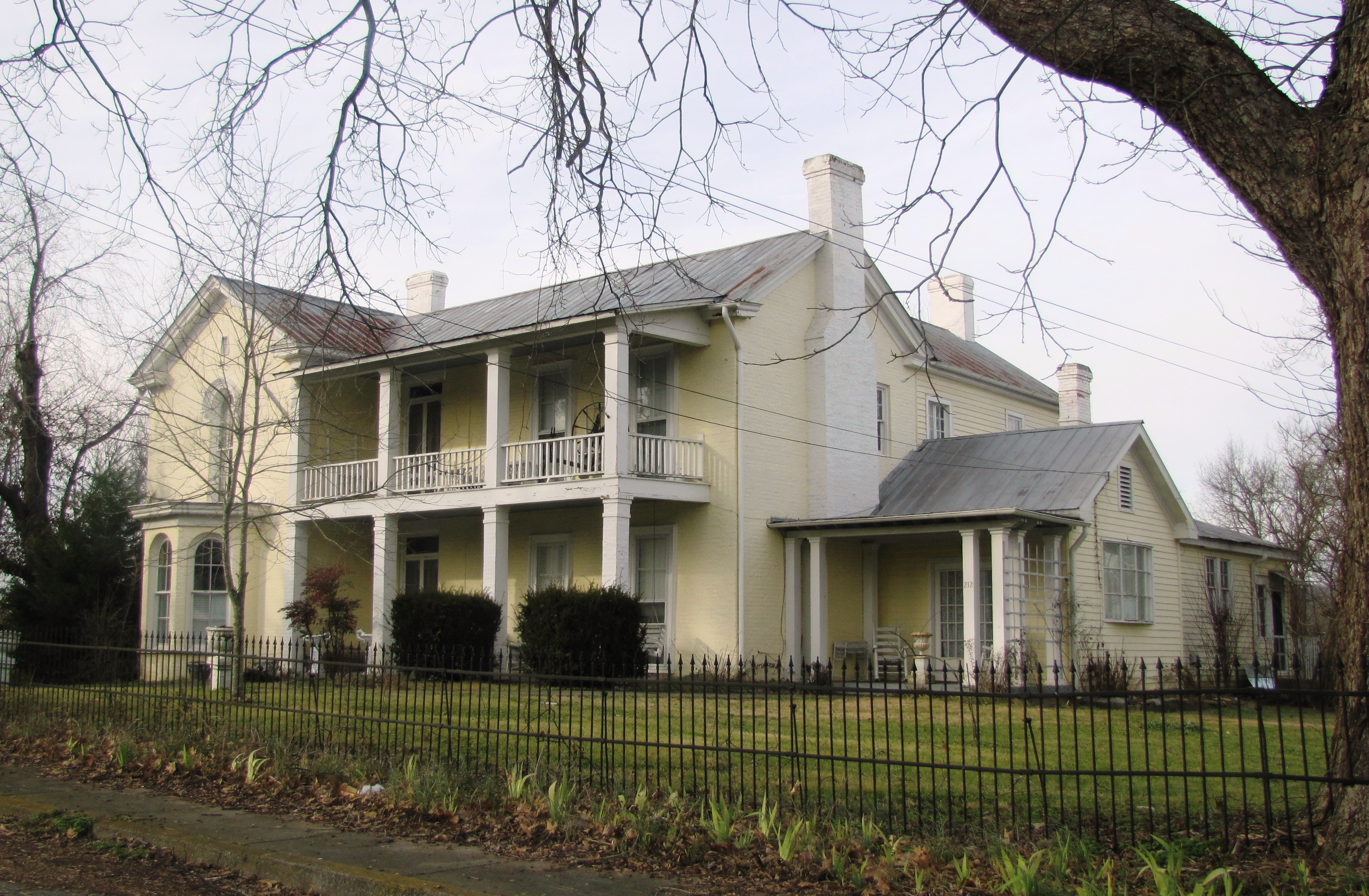
- Fite-Williams-Ligon House in 2010

- Location within Tennessee Location within the United States
- Location: 212 Fite Avenue West, Carthage, Tennessee, U.S.
- Coordinates: 36°15′15.7″N 85°57′13.5″W
- Area: 3.9 acres (1.6 ha)
- Built: c. 1850
- Architectural style: Italianate
- NRHP reference No.: 03000663
- Added to NRHP: July 17, 2003

The Fite-Williams-Ligon House is a historic mansion in Carthage, Tennessee in the United States.

== Location ==
It is located at 212 Fite Avenue West in Carthage, a small town in Smith County, Tennessee. It sits on a bluff 0.5 miles (800 m) away from the Cumberland River.

== History ==
The two-storey house was built circa 1850. It was designed in the Italianate architectural style, with bricks painted in white and a gable roof. By 1877, a gabled ell and hall were added to the main building. It was remodelled circa 1920.

During the Civil War, the house was used as a hospital for the Union Army. After the war, it belonged to Robert M. King. In 1873, it was purchased by Confederate Colonel John Armenus Fite, who lived there with his wife, two daughters and a black servant. By 1905, the house was acquired by J.W. Williams, the president of the Carthage Packet Company. It was purchased by L.A. Ligon in 1919. After Ligon's death in 1947, the house was purchased by his daughter Margaret and her husband, J.T. Westmoreland. In 1996, it was purchased by their granddaughter.

== Architectural significance ==
It has been listed on the National Register of Historic Places since July 17, 2003.
