= Haynes House (Decherd, Tennessee) =

Historic place in Tennessee, United States

- U.S. National Register of Historic Places
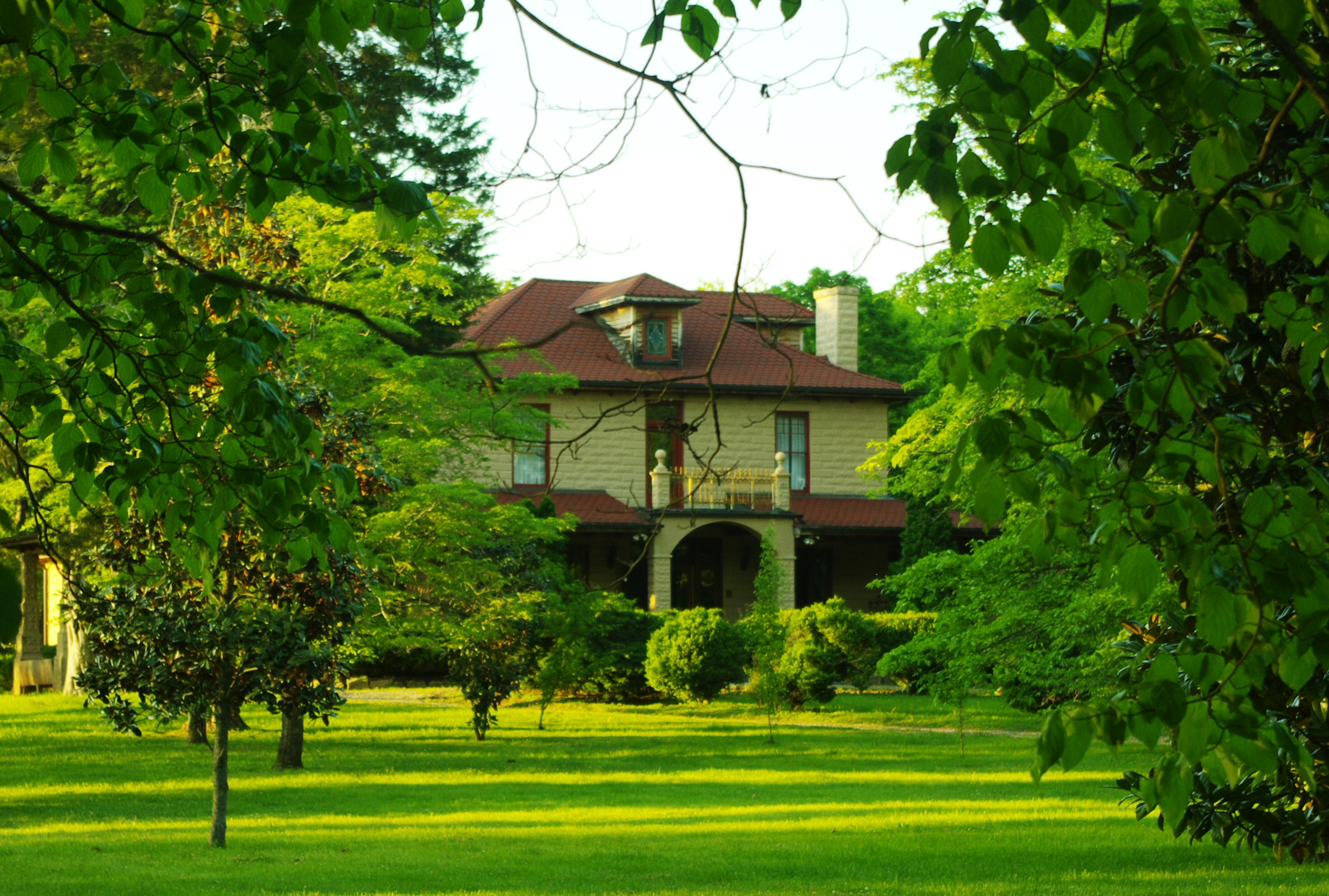

- Location within Tennessee Location within the United States
- Location: 519 Spring Street, Decherd, Tennessee
- Coordinates: 35°12′44″N 86°04′16″W
- Area: 4.9 acres (2.0 ha)
- Built: 1912
- Built by: Jonathan Haynes Jr.
- Architectural style: Bungalow/craftsman, American Foursquare
- NRHP reference No.: 05000359
- Added to NRHP: April 28, 2005

The Haynes House is a historic house in Decherd, Tennessee, U.S..

== History ==
The house was built in 1912 for Jonathan L. Haynes Jr, a merchant. It was built on the site of a former house-turned-school, Terrill College later known as Franklin County High School. Haynes was a co-founder and director of the Citizens Bank and Trust Company, and a vice president of the First National Bank of Franklin County. His son, Walter M. Haynes, also known as Pete Haynes, served as a member of the Tennessee House of Representatives and the Tennessee Senate. The house remained in the Haynes family until 2001.

== Architectural significance ==
The house was designed in the American Foursquare architectural style. It has been listed on the National Register of Historic Places since April 28, 2005.
