= Belvidere, Tennessee =

Unincorporated community in Tennessee, US

- Census-designated place (CDP)
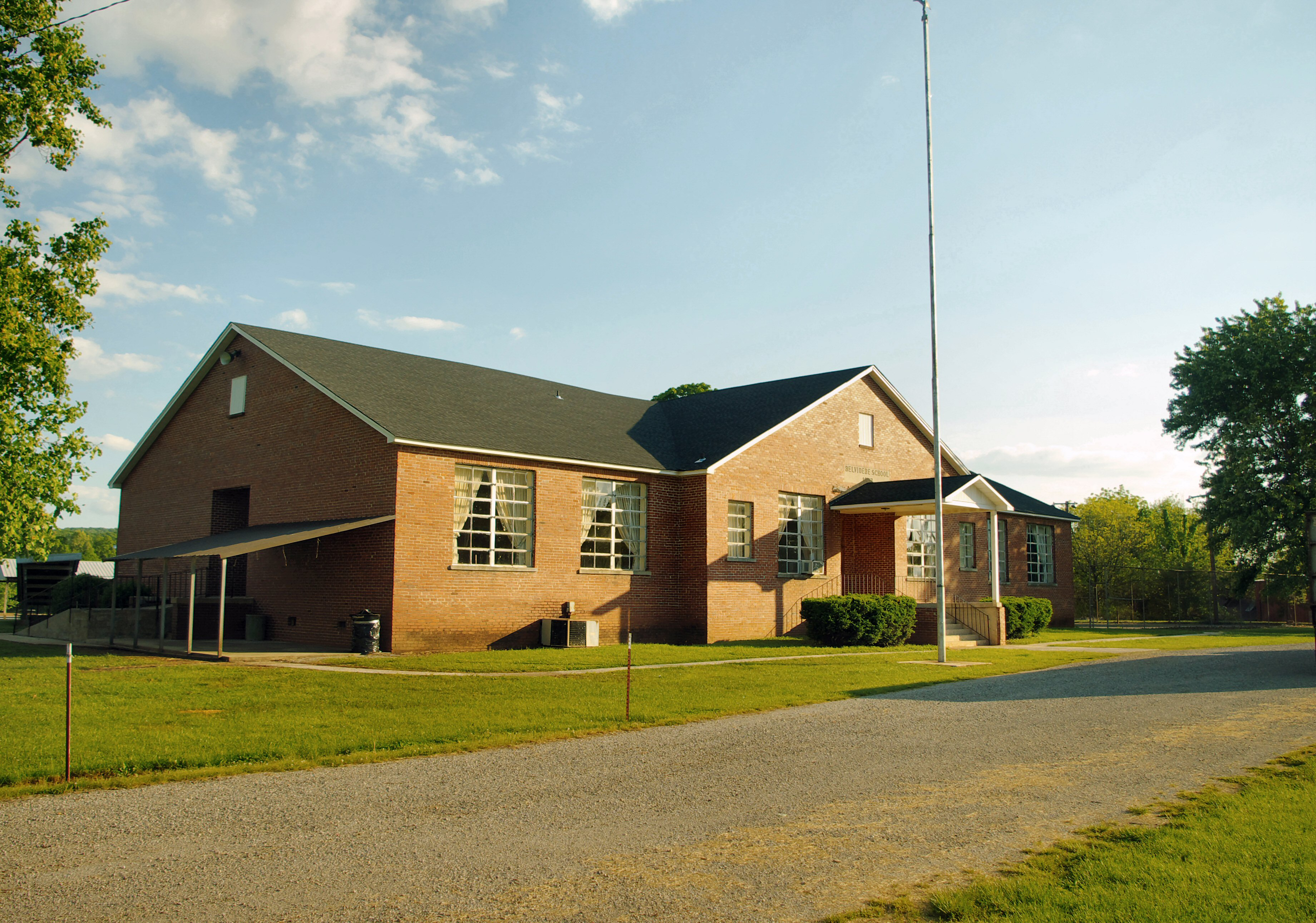
- Former Belvidere School is now a community center (2015)

- Location within Tennessee Location within the United States
- Coordinates: 35°7′45.3″N 86°11′11.95″W
- Country: United States
- State: Tennessee
- County: Franklin
- Elevation: 988 ft (301 m)
- Time zone: UTC-6 (CST)
  - Summer (DST): UTC-5 (CDT)
- ZIP Code: 37306
- Area code: 931
- FIPS code: 47-04920
- GNIS ID: 1276984

Belvidere is a census-designated place (CDP) and unincorporated community in Franklin County, Tennessee, United States. Belvidere is a name of Italian origin meaning "beautiful sight".

== History ==
A post office has been in operation in Belvidere since 1870.

== See also ==
- Falls Mill, located southwest of Belvidere
