= Dixon Springs, Tennessee =

- Unincorporated community
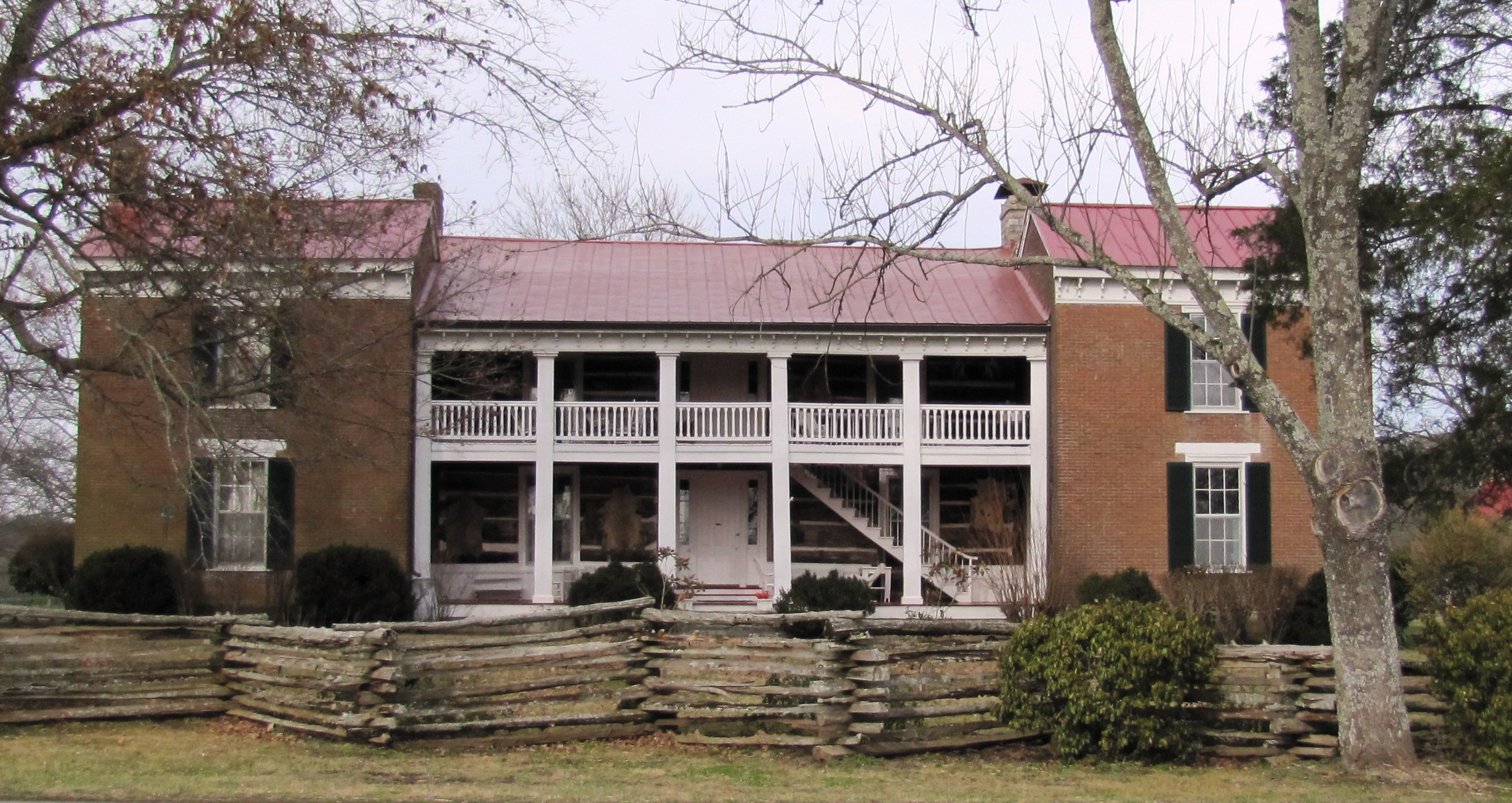
- Dixona, the home of Tilman Dixon, namesake of Dixon Springs

- Location within Tennessee Location within the United States
- Coordinates: 36°21′32″N 86°03′09″W
- Country: United States
- State: Tennessee
- County: Smith
- Elevation: 472 ft (144 m)
- Time zone: UTC-6 (Central (CST))
  - Summer (DST): UTC-5 (CDT)
- ZIP code: 37057
- Area code: 615
- GNIS feature ID: 1306354

Dixon Springs is an unincorporated community in Smith County, Tennessee, United States. It is located along Tennessee State Route 25 (Dixon Springs Highway) between Carthage and Hartsville. Dixon Springs has a post office, with zip code 37057.

Once a thriving area between Carthage and Hartsville, the community still has many antebellum homes and significant cemeteries of early settlers in the area, including the grave of Col. William Martin, pioneer of the region and eldest son of General Joseph Martin of Virginia. Dixon Springs was settled prior to 1787 by its namesake, Tilman Dixon, Revolutionary War soldier, where his historic home, Dixona, site of the first Smith County court meeting, still stands.

On June 20, 1863, a Civil War skirmish was fought between Confederate soldiers and the Northern occupiers of Dixon Springs at that time. The location of the skirmish was most likely to have taken place approximately a half mile out Rome Road where the northern occupiers commandeered a plantation and dug a trench along a hillside overlooking Rome Road (still visible today) so they could guard the road from any confederates that may have been approaching the Hartsville/Gallatin Pike after crossing the ferry from Rome over to Beasley Bend.
