= Trinity Episcopal Church (Winchester, Tennessee) =

Historic church in Tennessee, United States

- U.S. National Register of Historic Places
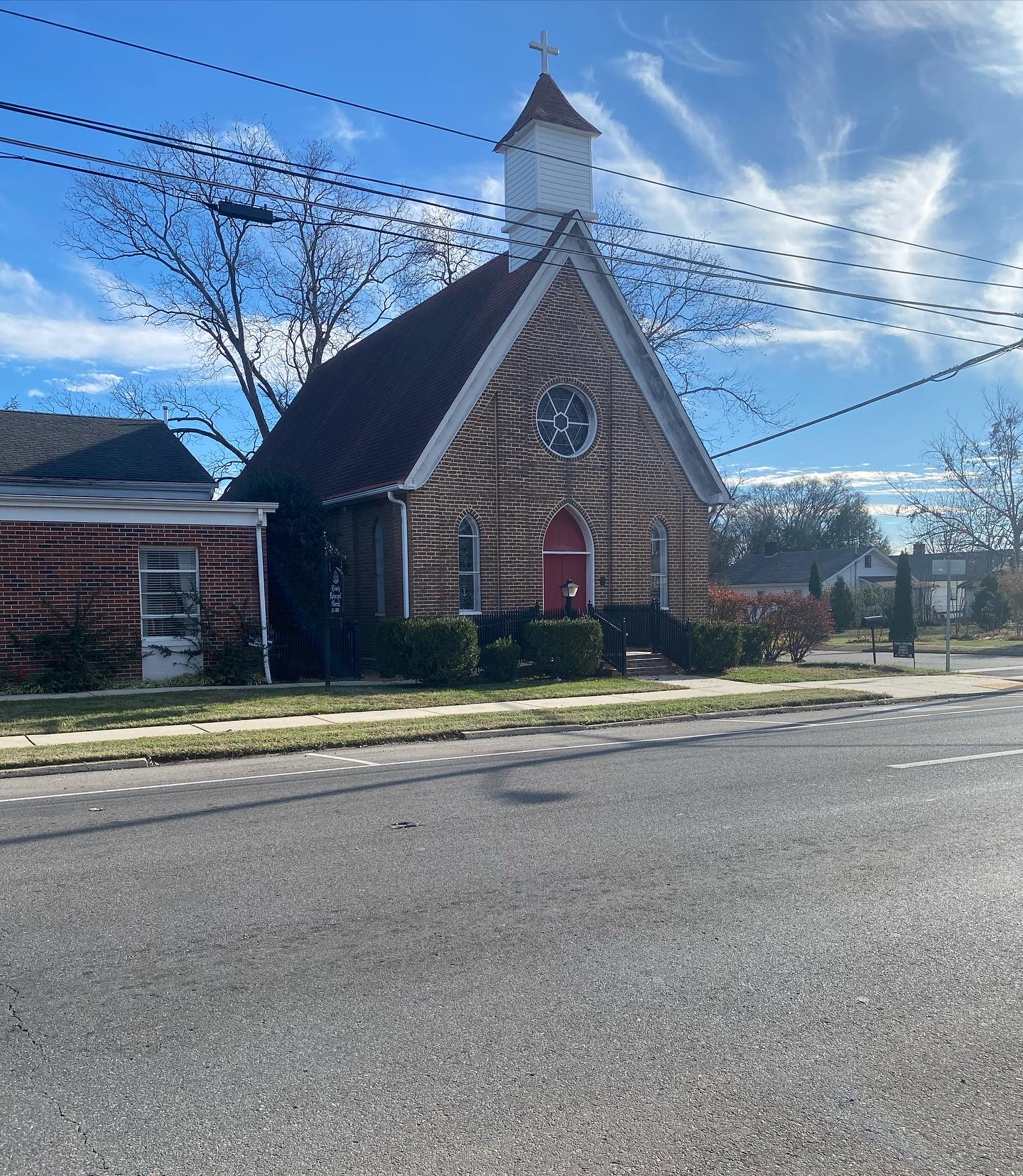
- Trinity Episcopal Church in 2022
- Location: 213 1st Ave., NW, Winchester, Tennessee, USA
- Area: 0.1 acres (0.040 ha)
- Built: 1872
- Architectural style: Gothic Revival
- NRHP reference No.: 80003796
- Added to NRHP: November 25, 1980

Trinity Episcopal Church is a parish church of the Episcopal Church of the United States located at 213 1st Ave., NW in Winchester, Tennessee, USA, and affiliated with the Episcopal Diocese of Tennessee.

The church began in 1859 as a mission. Reverend Thomas A. Morris conducted the first Episcopal service in the county courthouse, with just one communicant. By June of that year, there 12 communicants, all of them women, as well as 52 Sunday school attendees. Male members were needed in order to form a parish. Several men joined later in 1859, and the parish was organized in 1860, with 26 members.

Some time after the parish was organized, the congregation acquired its first permanent building, buying the former First Cumberland Presbyterian Church. In 1863, the Union Army occupied Winchester and used the church building as a military hospital. Either during the Union occupation or later in the Civil War, the building was destroyed in a fire, and the congregation resumed its practice of conducting worship in the courthouse, as well as in the Carrick Academy building. In 1872, after several years of fundraising efforts, the foundation was laid for the current church building. The building was completed in 1874.

Through its history, Trinity has experienced fluctuations in membership, and has at times fallen below the size threshold necessary to be a recognized parish. In 2008, Trinity's priest and a number of members of the congregation left the Episcopal Church to form Christ the King Anglican Church, affiliated with the Convocation of Anglicans in North America under the ecclesiastical authority of the Church of Nigeria. The group was one of several that left the Episcopal Church after the Diocese of Tennessee's convention in 2006 because of objections to the actions of Episcopal leadership, particularly including the denomination's consecration of Gene Robinson, a gay man, as a bishop. Trinity church retained its traditional affiliation. It is now joined with four other Episcopal churches in a regional ministry, the Southeast Tennessee Episcopal Ministry (STEM), along with Holy Comforter, Monteagle; Christ Church, Alto; Christ Church, Tracy City; and Epiphany Mission Church, Sherwood.

The church building was added to the National Register of Historic Places in 1980.
