= Asia, Tennessee =

- Unincorporated community
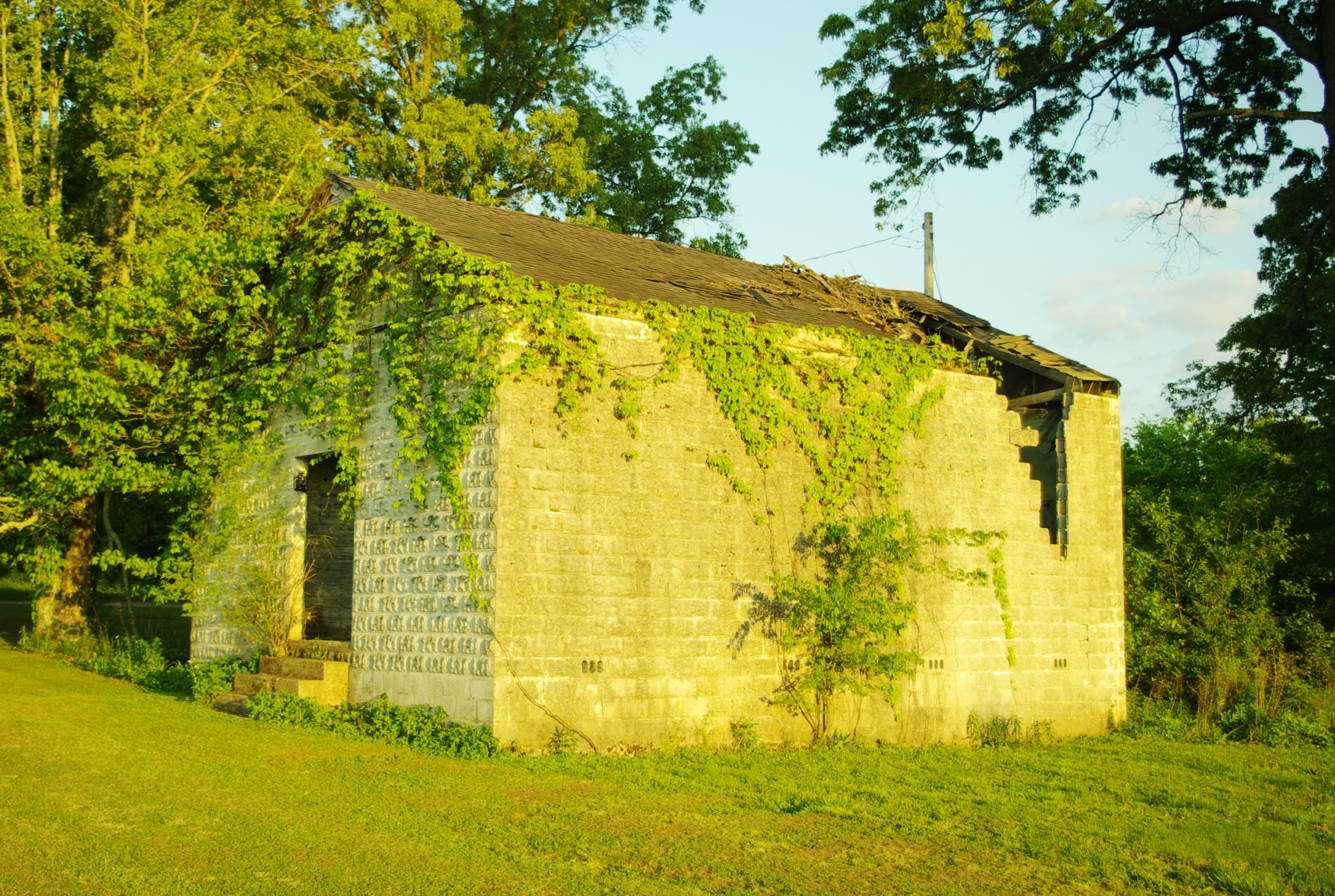
- Asia School

- Location within Tennessee Location within the United States
- Coordinates: 35°14′38″N 86°05′25″W
- Country: United States
- State: Tennessee
- County: Franklin
- Elevation: 984 ft (300 m)
- Time zone: UTC-6 (Central (CST))
  - Summer (DST): UTC-5 (CDT)
- Area code: 931
- GNIS feature ID: 1275955

Asia is an unincorporated community in Franklin County, Tennessee, United States. The community is west of Tennessee State Route 127 and 2.4 miles (3.9 km) north of Decherd.

Asia School, which is listed on the National Register of Historic Places, is located in Asia.
