= Estill-Fite House =

- U.S. National Register of Historic Places
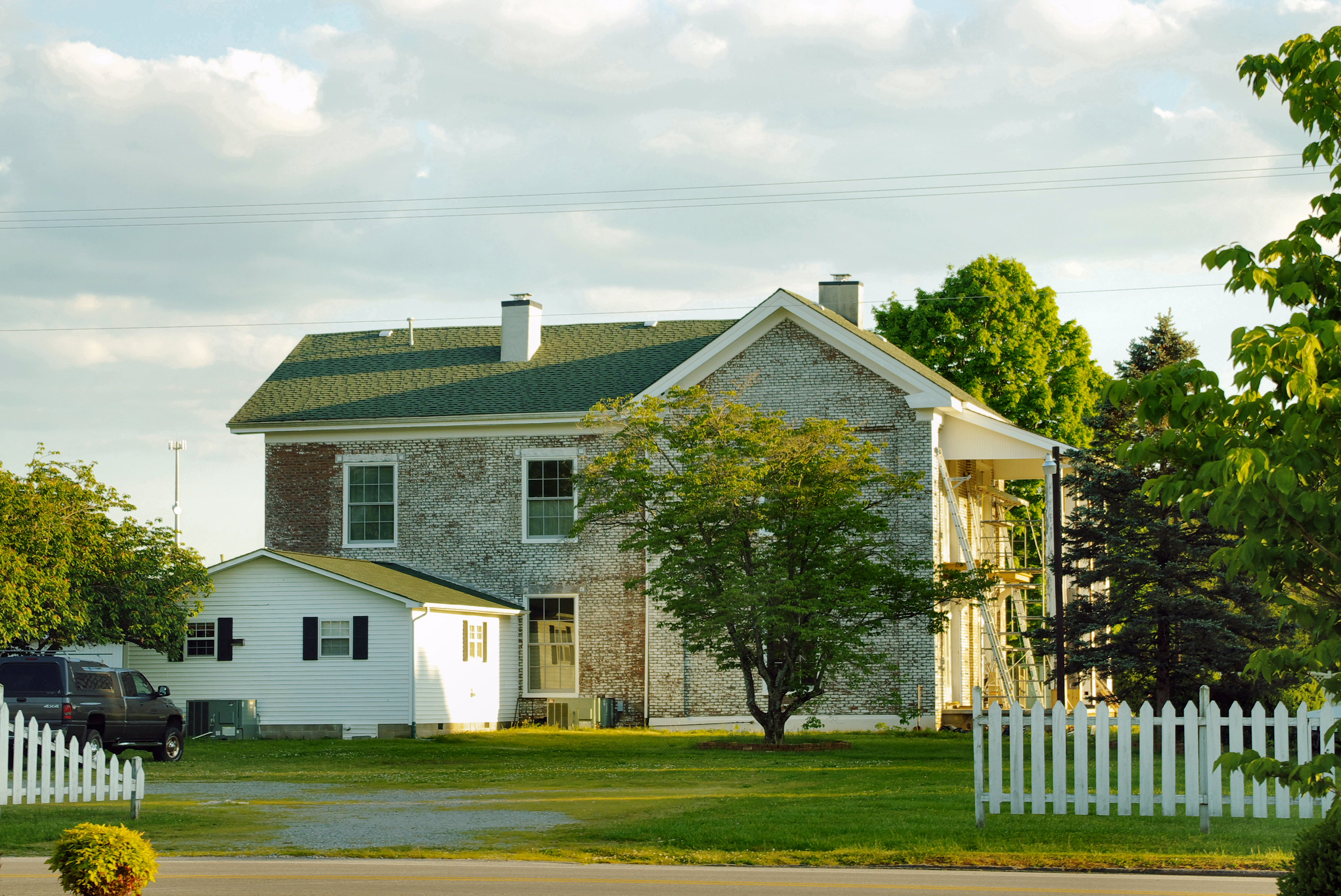

- Location within Tennessee Location within the United States
- Location: 114 Sharp Springs Road, Winchester, Tennessee
- Coordinates: 35°11′28″N 86°06′28″W
- Area: 1 acre (0.40 ha)
- Built: 1860
- NRHP reference No.: 79002429
- Added to NRHP: March 23, 1979

The Estill-Fite House is a historic house in Winchester, Tennessee, U.S.. It was built in 1860 for Francis Thomas Estill, an attorney. Estill, a graduate of the University of Nashville, was elected as a member of the Tennessee House of Representatives in 1847, and as the secretary of the board of directors of the Winchester and Alabama Railroad Company in 1857. He died in 1878, and the house remained in the Estill family until 1920.

The house was purchased by the Fite family in 1950. It has been listed on the National Register of Historic Places since March 23, 1979.
