= Ernest Baxter Fite House =

Historic house in Alabama, United States

- U.S. National Register of Historic Places
- Alabama Register of Landmarks and Heritage
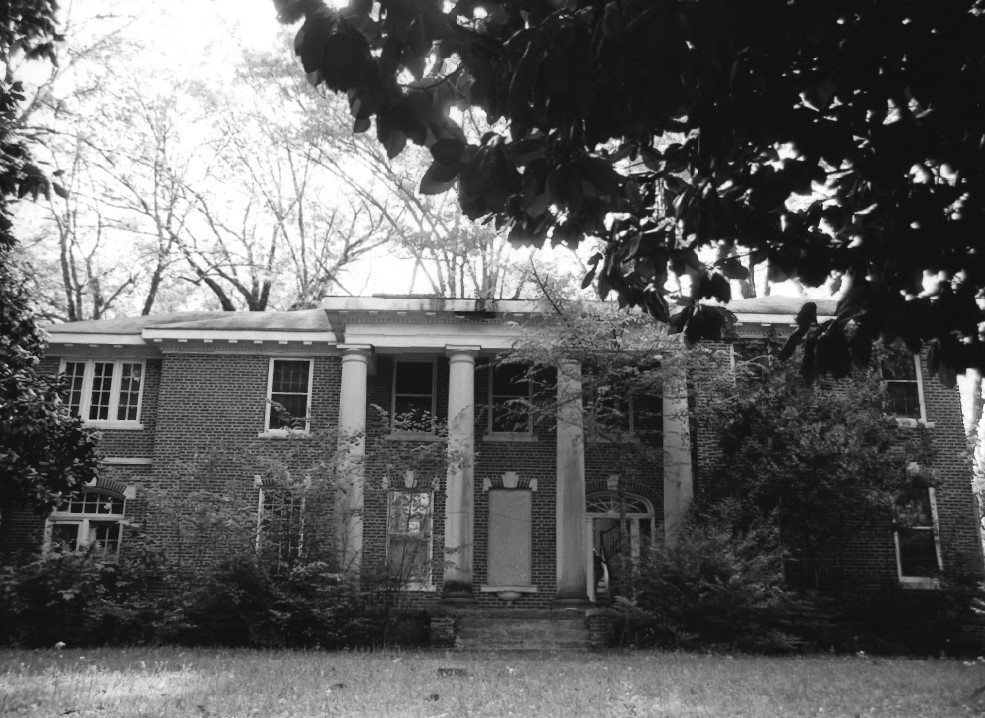
- East façade of Ernest Baxter Fite House

- Location within Alabama Location within the United States
- Location: Jct. of Jackson Military Rd. and Thomas St., Hamilton, Alabama
- Coordinates: 34°8′0″N 87°59′27″W
- Area: 9 acres (3.6 ha)
- Built: 1927–28
- Architect: Weatherly Carter
- Architectural style: Colonial Revival
- NRHP reference No.: 94001545

Significant dates
- Added to NRHP: August 28, 1997
- Designated ARLH: December 4, 1992

The Ernest Baxter Fite House is a historic residence in Hamilton, Alabama. Designed by Weatherly Carter, who had designed what later became the Alabama Governor's Mansion, the house was built in 1927–1928 for Ernest Baxter Fite, then a member of the Alabama House of Representatives and a former state senator. Ernest's son, Rankin Fite, served two terms as Speaker of the state House.

The house was built of brick in a Colonial Revival style. Four doric columns frame the front portico. The main entrance is in the right third of the portico. The house contains 17 rooms split between 2 floors, including 6 bedrooms. It was listed on the Alabama Register of Landmarks and Heritage in 1992 and the National Register of Historic Places in 1997.
