= Asia School =

Public, segregated school in Tennessee, US

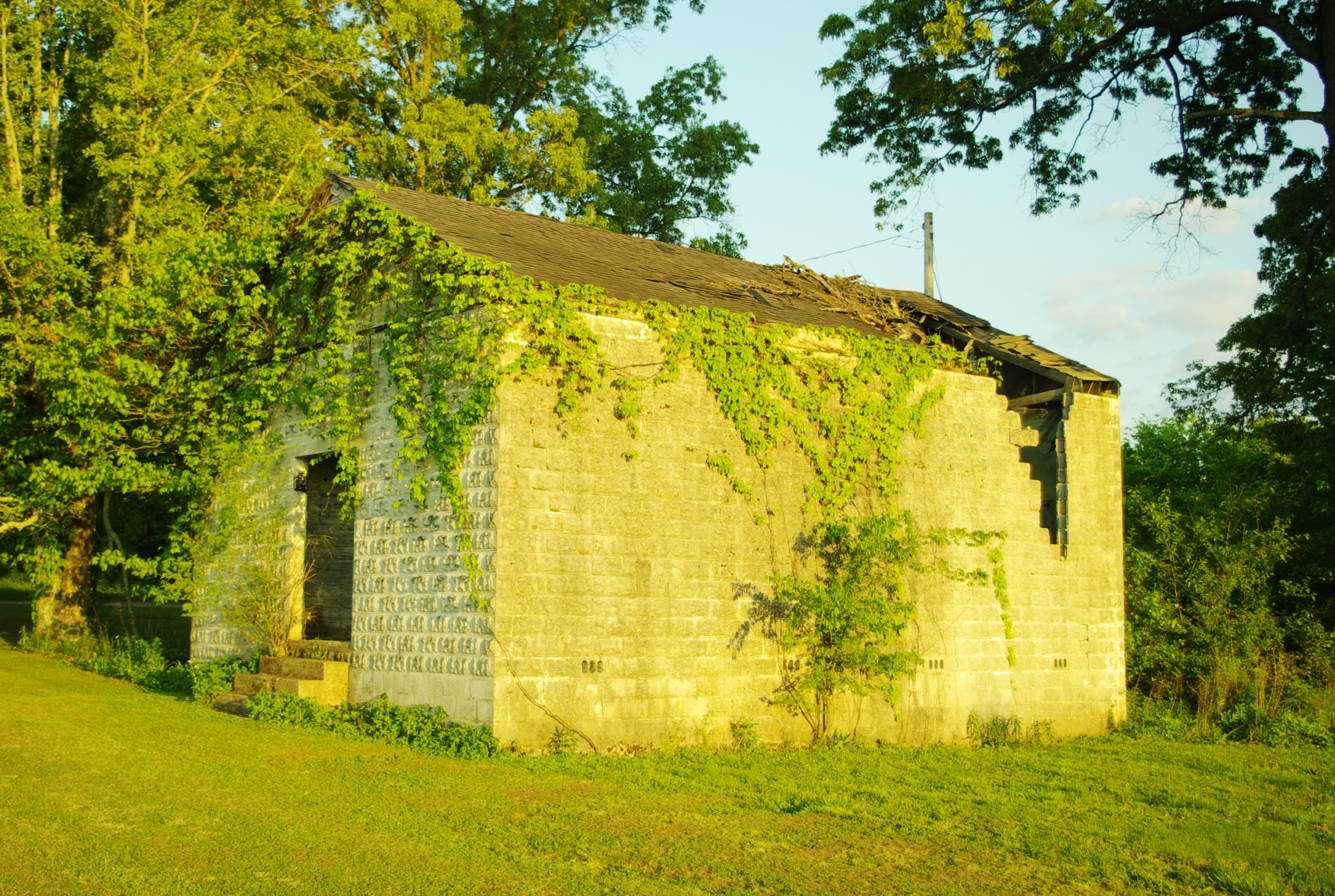
- Asia School

Location
- 525 Asia Road; Asia, Tennessee
- Coordinates: 35.2439711°N 86.0924846°W

Information
- Type: Public, segregated
- Founded: 1940
- Closed: 1961

Asia School is a former segregated school for African Americans in the Asia community of Franklin County, Tennessee.

For many years, the Macedonia Primitive Baptist Church operated a black school on the Asia School site. In 1940, the church transferred the property to Franklin County, which assumed responsibility for the school. The current school building is a concrete-block structure that was completed around 1952. It was operated as a county public school for African-American children until 1961, when the county closed the school and returned the property to the church.

Four years after Asia School closed, Franklin County integrated its public schools. Asia School was listed on the National Register of Historic Places in 2011 for its significance as an example of a 20th-century African-American school in rural Tennessee.
