= Dixona =

Historic house in Tennessee, United States

- U.S. National Register of Historic Places
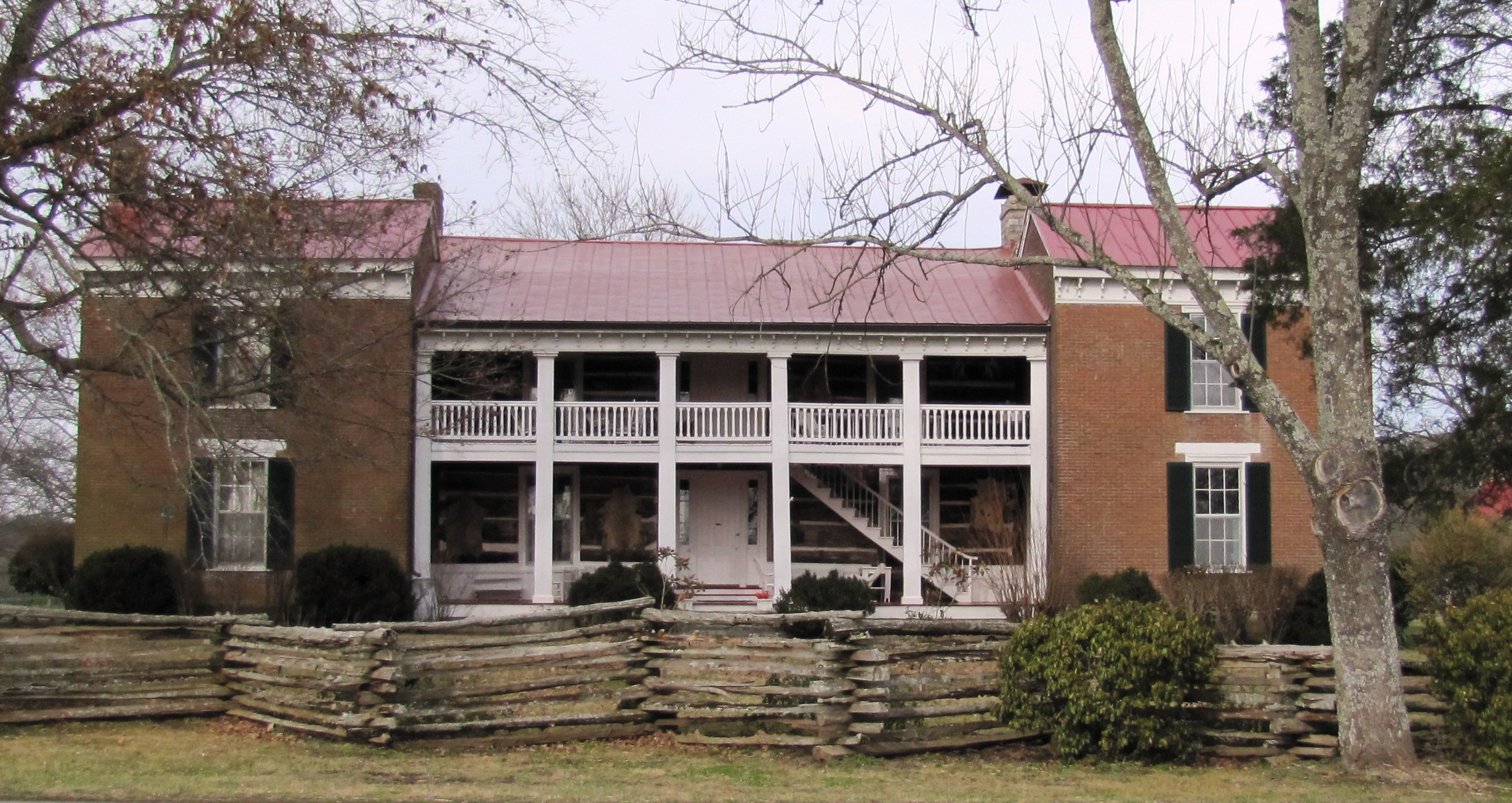
- Dixona

- Location within Tennessee Location within the United States
- Interactive map showing the location of Dixona
- Nearest city: Dixon Springs, Tennessee
- Coordinates: 36°21′44″N 86°3′34″W
- Area: 9 acres (3.6 ha)
- Built: 1790
- Architectural style: Log house, Italianate, Greek Revival
- NRHP reference No.: 73001832
- Added to NRHP: July 5, 1973

Dixona is a historic house in Smith County, Tennessee, near Dixon Springs. It is one of the oldest homes in Middle Tennessee.

The house was built in 1790-92 by Tilman Dixon, a Revolutionary War soldier who was Dixon Springs' first settler and namesake. His land holdings, received as a Revolutionary War land grant, totaled 3,840 acres (1,550 ha). In 1797, Louis Philippe, then Duke of Orleans and later King of France, stayed in Dixona together with his brothers, the Duke of Montpensier and Count of Beaujolais, during their travels in America. The house was Smith County's first tavern and post office, and in 1799, it was the site for the first county court meeting.

The original house was an eight-room log building. A major expansion in 1858 added a pair of Italianate brick wings and Greek Revival-style porches with columns, converting it to a two-story "piano box" and increasing its size to more than 4,500 square feet (420 m^{2}). The original log structure still forms the core of the house.

Dixona was listed on the National Register of Historic Places in 1973. Since 2007, Dixona Farm, the 148-acre (60 ha) tract on which Dixona is located, has been protected by a conservation easement held by the Land Trust for Tennessee.

== See also ==
- List of the oldest buildings in Tennessee
