= Carthage, Tennessee =

- Town
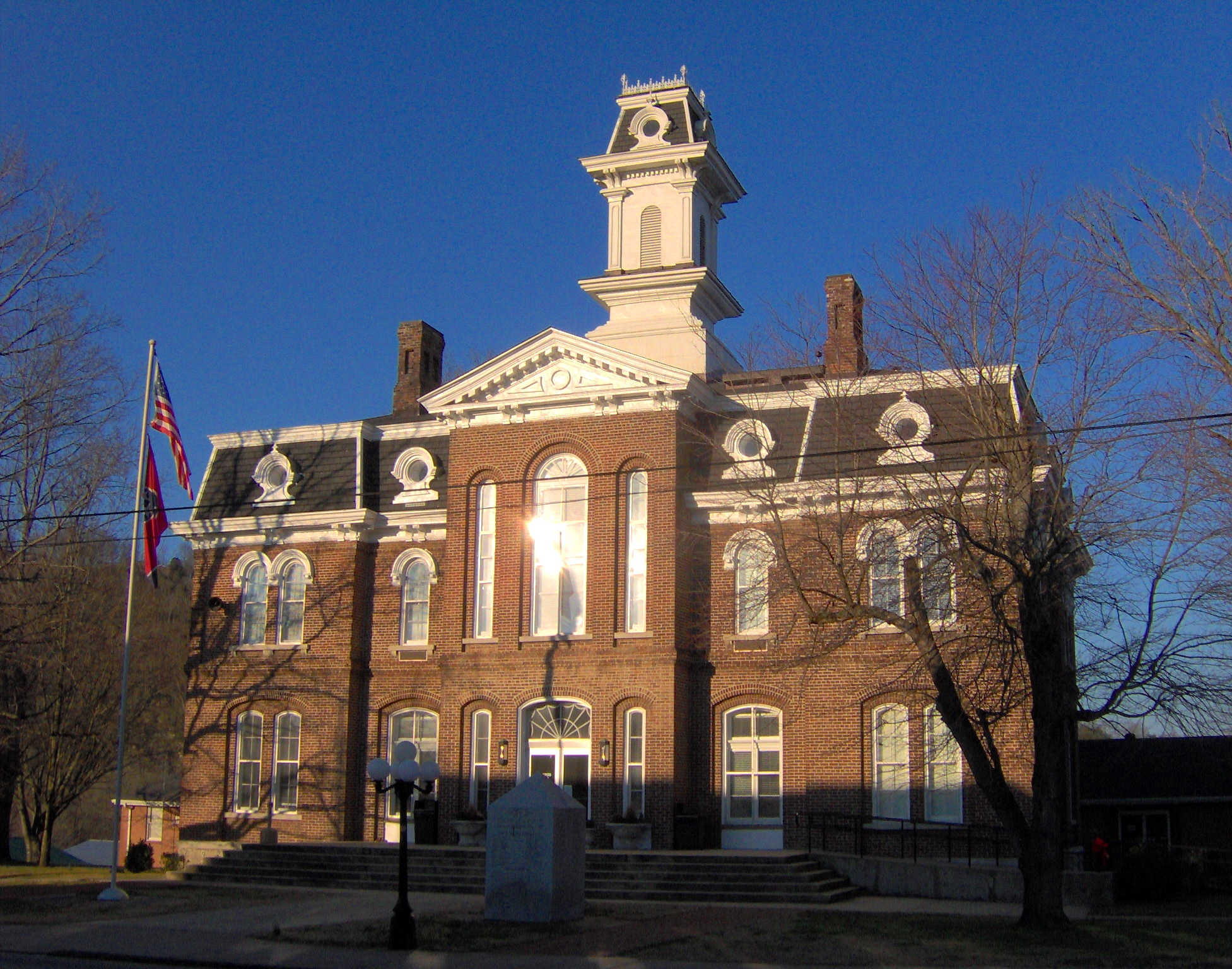
- Smith County Courthouse in Carthage

- Location of Carthage in Smith County, Tennessee.

- Location within Tennessee Location within the United States
- Coordinates: 36°15′18″N 85°56′57″W
- Country: United States
- State: Tennessee
- County: Smith
- Settled: 1789
- Incorporated: 1804
- Named for: Ancient Carthage

Area
  - Total: 2.90 sq mi (7.52 km^{2})
  - Land: 2.90 sq mi (7.52 km^{2})
  - Water: 0 sq mi (0.00 km^{2})
- Elevation: 515 ft (157 m)

Population (2020)
  - Total: 2,291
  - Density: 789.4/sq mi (304.78/km^{2})
- Time zone: UTC-6 (Central (CST))
  - Summer (DST): UTC-5 (CDT)
- ZIP code: 37030
- Area code: 615
- FIPS code: 47-11280
- GNIS feature ID: 1279827
- Website: www.townofcarthagetn.gov

Carthage is a town in and the county seat of Smith County, Tennessee, United States; it is part of the Nashville Metropolitan Statistical Area. As of the 2020 census, Carthage had a population of 2,291. It is located on the Cumberland River, which was important to its early development. It is best known as the hometown of former U.S. Vice President and Senator Al Gore of the Democratic Party and his father, Senator Albert Gore, Sr. The younger Gore announced his 1988 and 2000 presidential bids, as well as his 1992 vice-presidential bid, from the steps of the Smith County Courthouse.

== History ==
The earliest known European-American settler in what is now Carthage was William Walton (1760–1816), who arrived in the late 1780s after the United States achieved independence in the American Revolutionary War. Circa 1800, Walton directed the construction of the Walton Road (Cumberland Turnpike), an early stagecoach route connecting the Knoxville area in the east with Middle Tennessee. The road, which was roughly paralleled later by the construction of what is now U.S. 70, was influential to the development and early settlement of the Cumberland region. Walton operated a ferry across the Cumberland River and a tavern nearby along the road, around which a small community developed. In 1804, Walton's community was chosen as the county seat of the newly formed Smith County after a heated election, and the town of Carthage was laid out shortly thereafter.

Carthage's location at the confluence of the Caney Fork and Cumberland rivers made it an important shipping and steamboat port throughout the first half of the 19th century. The area was developed for tobacco and hemp crops, as well as blooded livestock. Goods were shipped downstream to Nashville. During the Civil War, Carthage became an important post in the Eastern Highland Rim area of Tennessee. Carthage was selected as part of the route Confederate General Braxton Bragg marched the Army of Mississippi through on his Confederate Heartland Offensive into Kentucky. Later on March 6, 1863, Union Brigadier General George Crook established a Union outpost in Carthage to serve as a base for his effort to clear out the considerable Confederate guerrilla insurgency from East Tennessee through Middle Tennessee.

Carthage's prominence as a river port on the Cumberland River was superseded after the railroads replaced river traffic in the later 19th century. The area's industrial focus shifted to South Carthage and Gordonsville.

== Geography ==
Carthage is located at 36°15′18″N 85°56′57″W (36.254960, -85.949211). The town is situated amid a series of low hills at the confluence of the Caney Fork with the Cumberland River, and just southwest of the latter's Cordell Hull Lake impoundment. South Carthage is located along the opposite bank of the Cumberland to the south.

U.S. Route 70 passes east-to-west through South Carthage, connecting the area with Nashville to the west and Cookeville to the east. State Route 53 connects U.S. 70 with Gordonsville and Interstate 40 to the south. State Route 25 connects Carthage with Trousdale County and north-central Tennessee to the northwest, and State Route 80 connects the town with Macon County to the north.

According to the United States Census Bureau, the town has a total area of 2.9 square miles (7.5 km^{2}), all land.

== Demographics ==
Historical population
Census	Pop.	Note	%±
1870	477		—
1880	327		−31.4%
1890	478		46.2%
1910	904		—
1920	920		1.8%
1930	1,068		16.1%
1940	1,512		41.6%
1950	1,604		6.1%
1960	2,021		26.0%
1970	2,491		23.3%
1980	2,672		7.3%
1990	2,386		−10.7%
2000	2,251		−5.7%
2010	2,306		2.4%
2020	2,291		−0.7%

=== 2020 census ===
Carthage racial composition
Race	Number	Percentage
White (non-Hispanic)	1,984	86.6%
Black or African American (non-Hispanic)	105	4.58%
Native American	5	0.22%
Asian	26	1.13%
Other/Mixed	83	3.62%
Hispanic or Latino	88	3.84%

As of the 2020 United States census, there were 2,291 people, 947 households, and 528 families residing in the town.

=== 2000 census ===
As of the census of 2000, there were 2,251 people, 952 households, and 560 families residing in the town. The population density was 784.5 inhabitants per square mile (302.9/km^{2}). There were 1,050 housing units at an average density of 365.9 per square mile (141.3/km^{2}). The racial makeup of the town was 90.67% White, 6.53% African American, 0.27% Native American, 0.53% Asian, 0.76% from other races, and 1.24% from two or more races. Hispanic or Latino of any race were 1.16% of the population.

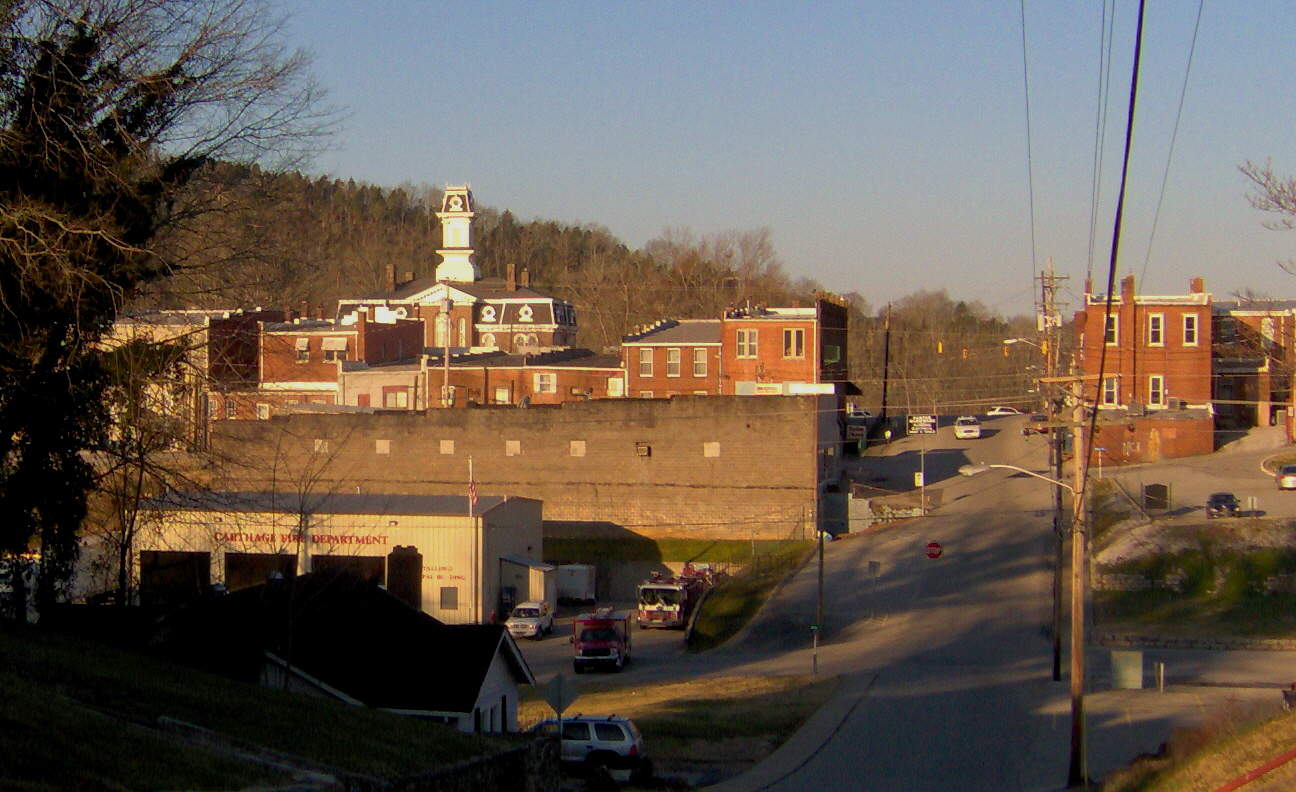
The Carthage business district

There were 952 households, out of which 25.9% had children under the age of 18 living with them, 38.2% were married couples living together, 16.5% had a female householder with no husband present, and 41.1% were non-families. 38.2% of all households were made up of individuals, and 21.6% had someone living alone who was 65 years of age or older. The average household size was 2.22 and the average family size was 2.93.

In the town, the population was spread out, with 21.9% under the age of 18, 8.6% from 18 to 24, 23.9% from 25 to 44, 22.7% from 45 to 64, and 22.7% who were 65 years of age or older. The median age was 42 years. For every 100 females, there were 80.1 males. For every 100 females age 18 and over, there were 72.6 males.

The median income for a household in the town was $24,375, and the median income for a family was $32,159. Males had a median income of $30,531 versus $20,417 for females. The per capita income for the town was $18,709. About 18.6% of families and 20.6% of the population were below the poverty line, including 23.0% of those under age 18 and 19.2% of those age 65 or over.

== Education ==
Carthage and other surrounding areas in Smith County are served by Smith County Schools and the Smith County Board of Education. They include:

- Carthage Elementary
- Defeated Elementary
- New Middleton Elementary
- Union Heights Elementary
- Forks River Elementary
- Smith County Middle School New Page 1
- Gordonsville High School
- Smith County High School
- Smith County Adult Education
- Smith County HeadStart

== Climate ==
The climate in this area is characterized by hot, humid summers and generally mild to cool winters. According to the Köppen Climate Classification system, Carthage has a humid subtropical climate, abbreviated "Cfa" on climate maps.

Climate data for carthage, Tennessee (1991–2020 normals, extremes 1890–present)
Month	Jan	Feb	Mar	Apr	May	Jun	Jul	Aug	Sep	Oct	Nov	Dec	Year
Record high °F (°C)	88 (31)	83 (28)	92 (33)	95 (35)	98 (37)	105 (41)	110 (43)	111 (44)	108 (42)	97 (36)	87 (31)	77 (25)	111 (44)
Mean daily maximum °F (°C)	48.1 (8.9)	52.5 (11.4)	61.4 (16.3)	71.3 (21.8)	78.7 (25.9)	85.7 (29.8)	89.0 (31.7)	88.4 (31.3)	83.7 (28.7)	73.1 (22.8)	61.5 (16.4)	51.7 (10.9)	70.4 (21.3)
Daily mean °F (°C)	37.6 (3.1)	41.1 (5.1)	48.8 (9.3)	57.9 (14.4)	66.4 (19.1)	74.2 (23.4)	78.1 (25.6)	76.8 (24.9)	71.3 (21.8)	59.8 (15.4)	48.8 (9.3)	41.1 (5.1)	58.5 (14.7)
Mean daily minimum °F (°C)	27.0 (−2.8)	29.6 (−1.3)	36.1 (2.3)	44.5 (6.9)	54.1 (12.3)	62.8 (17.1)	67.1 (19.5)	65.2 (18.4)	58.8 (14.9)	46.5 (8.1)	36.0 (2.2)	30.4 (−0.9)	46.5 (8.1)
Record low °F (°C)	−17 (−27)	−15 (−26)	3 (−16)	21 (−6)	30 (−1)	40 (4)	49 (9)	46 (8)	32 (0)	23 (−5)	0 (−18)	−9 (−23)	−17 (−27)
Average precipitation inches (mm)	4.49 (114)	4.86 (123)	5.01 (127)	4.41 (112)	4.73 (120)	5.03 (128)	4.97 (126)	3.71 (94)	3.40 (86)	3.43 (87)	3.55 (90)	4.92 (125)	52.51 (1,334)
Average snowfall inches (cm)	0.5 (1.3)	0.7 (1.8)	0.2 (0.51)	0.0 (0.0)	0.0 (0.0)	0.0 (0.0)	0.0 (0.0)	0.0 (0.0)	0.0 (0.0)	0.0 (0.0)	0.0 (0.0)	0.1 (0.25)	1.5 (3.8)
Average precipitation days (≥ 0.01 in)	10.2	10.2	10.8	10.2	10.3	9.8	10.1	8.0	7.4	7.4	8.3	10.3	113.0
Average snowy days (≥ 0.1 in)	0.7	0.6	0.2	0.0	0.0	0.0	0.0	0.0	0.0	0.0	0.1	0.2	1.8
Source: NOAA

== Notable people ==
- William Cullom (1810–1896), U.S. representative for Tennessee
- James Comer (born 1972), U.S. representative for Kentucky
- Albert Gore Sr. (1907–1998), U.S. senator for Tennessee
- Albert Gore, Jr. (born 1948), U.S. vice president and senator
- Keith Habersberger (born 1987), YouTuber
- Simon P. Hughes Jr. (1830–1906), governor of Arkansas and Arkansas Supreme Court justice
- Cordell Hull (1871–1955), U.S. secretary of state and U.S. senator
- Brandon Maggart (born 1933), actor
- George McCorkle (1946–2007), founding member of the Marshall Tucker Band and guitarist
- Benton McMillin (1845–1933), governor of Tennessee, U.S. ambassador to Peru and Guatemala, and U.S. representative for Tennessee
- Sharon Wyatt, actress
