= Macon County, Tennessee =

County in Tennessee, United States

- County
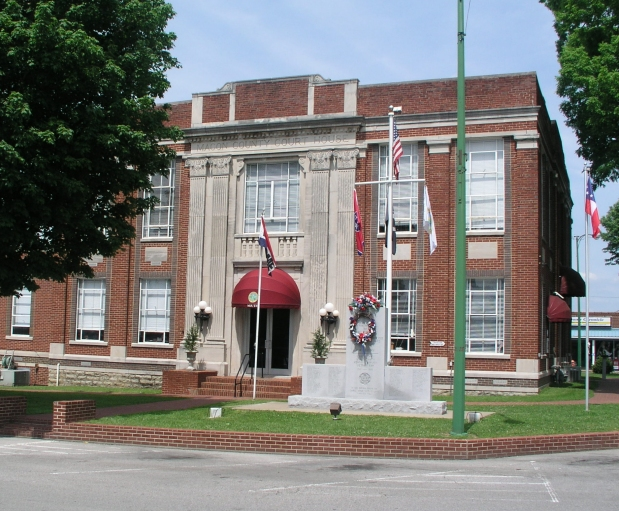
- Macon County Courthouse in Lafayette

- Seal

- Location within the U.S. state of Tennessee
- Coordinates: 36°32′N 86°01′W
- Country: United States
- State: Tennessee
- Founded: 1842
- Named for: Nathaniel Macon
- Seat: Lafayette
- Largest city: Lafayette

Area
  - Total: 307 sq mi (800 km^{2})
  - Land: 307 sq mi (800 km^{2})
  - Water: 0.1 sq mi (0.26 km^{2}) 0.03%

Population (2020)
  - Total: 25,216
  - Estimate (2025): 27,663 ▲
  - Density: 72/sq mi (28/km^{2})
- Time zone: UTC−6 (Central)
  - Summer (DST): UTC−5 (CDT)
- Congressional district: 6th
- Website: maconcountytn.gov

Macon County is a county located in the U.S. state of Tennessee As of the 2020 census, the population was 25,216. Its county seat is Lafayette. Macon County is part of the Nashville-Davidson–Murfreesboro–Franklin, TN Metropolitan Statistical Area.

== History ==
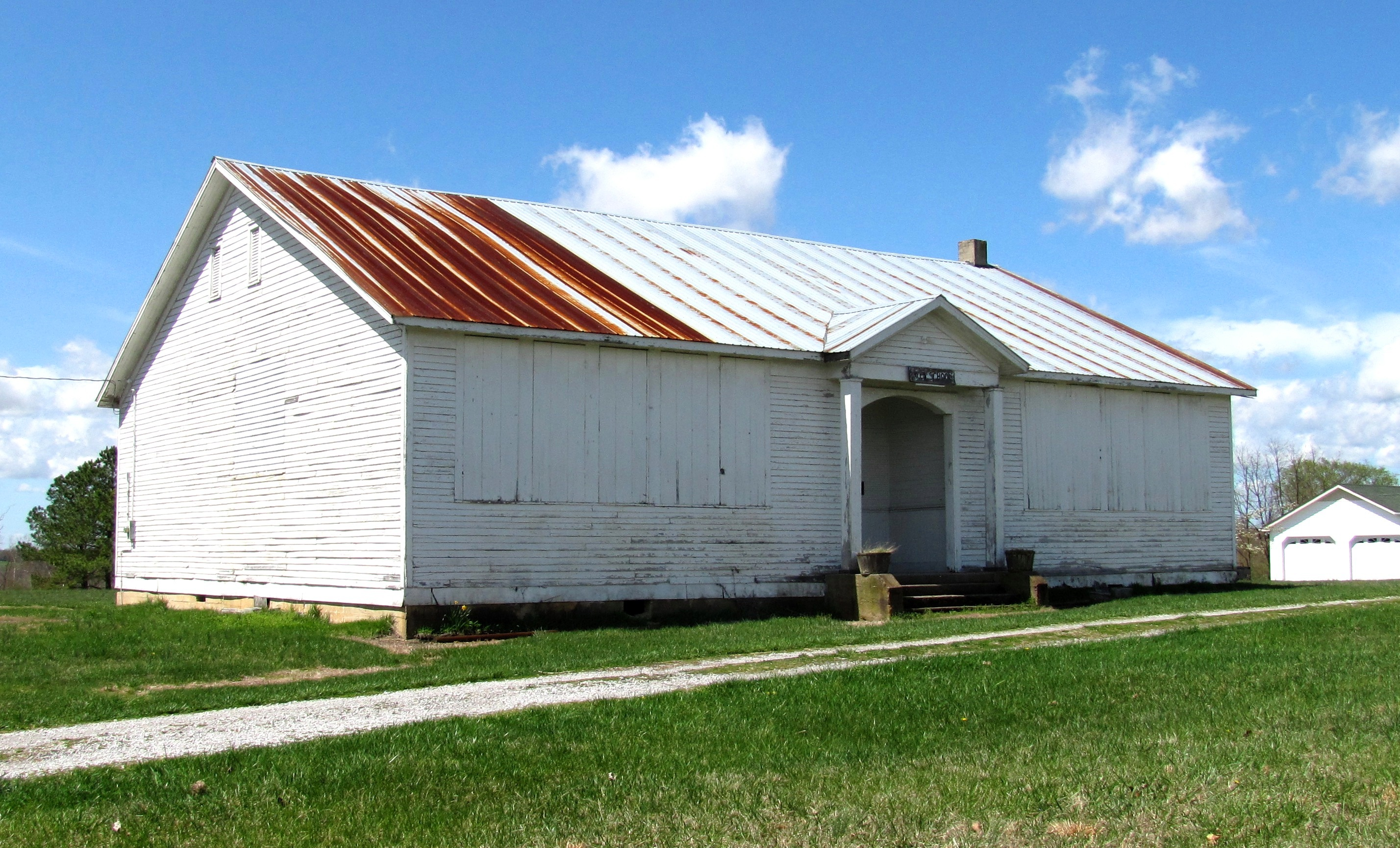
Old Galen Elementary School building near Lafayette

Macon County was formed in 1842 from parts of Smith and Sumner counties. It was named in honor of the late Revolutionary War veteran and United States Senator, Nathaniel Macon. The county seat was named in honor of the Marquis de Lafayette.

Unlike adjacent counties of Middle Tennessee, which were generally pro-Confederate, but like neighbouring counties in Kentucky, Macon County was largely pro-Union during the Civil War. In Tennessee's Ordinance of Secession referendum on June 8, 1861, Macon County voted to remain in the Union by a margin of 697 to 447. Macon was one of only eight counties in West or Middle Tennessee to support the Union. Earlier on February 9, 1861, Macon County voters had voted against holding a secession convention by a margin of 960 to 73. Many Macon Countians served in Kentucky Union regiments, especially the Ninth Infantry Regiment, because secessionists in surrounding Tennessee counties drove them over the state line.

The county's second-largest city, Red Boiling Springs, thrived as a mineral springs resort in the late 19th and early 20th centuries. Three hotels from this period — the Donoho Hotel, the Thomas House Hotel (previously the Cloyd Hotel), and the Armour's Hotel (previously the Counts Hotel) — are still open, though only the Armour's still offers mineral water treatments.

== Geography ==
According to the U.S. Census Bureau, the county has a total area of 307 square miles (800 km^{2}), of which 307 square miles (800 km^{2}) is land and 0.1 square miles (0.26 km^{2}) (0.03%) is water. Macon County is located amidst the northeastern Highland Rim, and is generally rugged and hilly.

=== Adjacent counties ===
- Monroe County, Kentucky (northeast)
- Clay County (east)
- Jackson County (southeast)
- Smith County (south)
- Trousdale County (southwest)
- Sumner County (west)
- Allen County, Kentucky (northwest)

== Demographics ==
Historical population
Census	Pop.	Note	%±
1850	6,948		—
1860	7,290		4.9%
1870	6,633		−9.0%
1880	9,321		40.5%
1890	10,878		16.7%
1900	12,881		18.4%
1910	14,559		13.0%
1920	14,922		2.5%
1930	13,872		−7.0%
1940	14,904		7.4%
1950	13,599		−8.8%
1960	12,197		−10.3%
1970	12,315		1.0%
1980	15,700		27.5%
1990	15,906		1.3%
2000	20,386		28.2%
2010	22,248		9.1%
2020	25,216		13.3%
2025 (est.)	27,663	▲	9.7%
U.S. Decennial Census; 1790-1960 1900-1990; 1990-2000 2010-2014

=== Racial and ethnic composition ===
Macon County, Tennessee – Racial and ethnic composition Note: the US Census treats Hispanic/Latino as an ethnic category. This table excludes Latinos from the racial categories and assigns them to a separate category. Hispanics/Latinos may be of any race.
Race / ethnicity (NH = Non-Hispanic)	Pop 1980	Pop 1990	Pop 2000	Pop 2010	Pop 2020	% 1980	% 1990	% 2000	% 2010	% 2020
White alone (NH)	15,516	15,778	19,784	20,961	22,439	98.83%	99.20%	97.05%	94.22%	88.99%
Black or African American alone (NH)	70	44	36	79	120	0.45%	0.28%	0.18%	0.36%	0.48%
Native American or Alaska Native alone (NH)	9	34	77	61	60	0.06%	0.21%	0.38%	0.27%	0.24%
Asian alone (NH)	1	10	45	44	44	0.01%	0.06%	0.22%	0.20%	0.17%
Native Hawaiian or Pacific Islander alone (NH)	x	x	13	3	8	x	x	0.06%	0.01%	0.03%
Other race alone (NH)	2	1	4	4	34	0.01%	0.01%	0.02%	0.02%	0.13%
Mixed race or Multiracial (NH)	x	x	78	177	827	x	x	0.38%	0.80%	3.28%
Hispanic or Latino (any race)	102	39	349	919	1,684	0.65%	0.25%	1.71%	4.13%	6.68%
Total	15,700	15,906	20,386	22,248	25,216	100.00%	100.00%	100.00%	100.00%	100.00%

=== 2020 census ===
As of the 2020 census, the county had a population of 25,216 and a median age of 38.8 years; 24.3% of residents were under the age of 18 and 16.5% were 65 years of age or older. For every 100 females there were 98.4 males, and for every 100 females age 18 and over there were 96.7 males age 18 and over.

The racial makeup of the county was 90.4% White, 0.5% Black or African American, 0.4% American Indian and Alaska Native, 0.2% Asian, <0.1% Native Hawaiian and Pacific Islander, 3.6% from some other race, and 4.9% from two or more races, with Hispanic or Latino residents of any race comprising 6.7% of the population.

24.5% of residents lived in urban areas, while 75.5% lived in rural areas.

There were 9,679 households in the county, of which 32.4% had children under the age of 18 living in them. Of all households, 50.5% were married-couple households, 17.6% were households with a male householder and no spouse or partner present, and 24.5% were households with a female householder and no spouse or partner present. About 25.7% of all households were made up of individuals and 12.0% had someone living alone who was 65 years of age or older.

There were 10,649 housing units, of which 9.1% were vacant. Among occupied housing units, 69.2% were owner-occupied and 30.8% were renter-occupied. The homeowner vacancy rate was 1.3% and the rental vacancy rate was 5.5%.

=== 2010 census ===
At the 2010 census, there were 22,248 people, 8,561 households, and 6,112 families living in the county. The population density was 72 people per square mile (28 people/km^{2}). There were 9,861 housing units at an average density of 32 units per square mile (12/km^{2}). The racial makeup of the county was 96.03% White, 0.42% Black or African American, 0.35% Native American, 0.20% Asian, 0.01% Pacific Islander, 1.96% from other races, and 1.04% from two or more races. 4.13% of the population were Hispanic or Latino of any race.

Of the 8,561 households 30.16% had children under the age of 18 living with them, 54.55% were married couples living together, 5.58% had a male householder with no wife present, 11.26% had a female householder with no husband present, and 28.61% were non-families. 24.27% of households were one person and 10.86% were one person aged 65 or older. The average household size was 2.57 and the average family size was 3.02.

The age distribution was 25.02% under the age of 18, 8.39% from 18 to 24, 31.59% from 25 to 44, 20.69% from 45 to 64, and 14.09% 65 or older. The median age was 38.7 years. For every 100 females, there were 97.08 males. For every 100 females age 18 and over, there were 95.21 males.

=== 2000 census ===
At the 2000 census there were 20,386 people, 7,916 households, and 5,802 families living in the county. The population density was 66 people per square mile (25 people/km^{2}). There were 8,894 housing units at an average density of 29 units per square mile (11/km^{2}). The racial makeup of the county was 97.86% White, 0.22% Black or African American, 0.42% Native American, 0.24% Asian, 0.07% Pacific Islander, 0.77% from other races, and 0.44% from two or more races. 1.71% of the population were Hispanic or Latino of any race. Of the 7,916 households 35.00% had children under the age of 18 living with them, 60.70% were married couples living together, 8.80% had a female householder with no husband present, and 26.70% were non-families. 23.80% of households were one person and 10.70% were one person aged 65 or older. The average household size was 2.55 and the average family size was 3.00.

The age distribution was 26.10% under the age of 18, 8.50% from 18 to 24, 29.40% from 25 to 44, 23.30% from 45 to 64, and 12.70% 65 or older. The median age was 36 years. For every 100 females, there were 97.40 males. For every 100 females age 18 and over, there were 95.10 males.

The median household income was $29,867 and the median family income was $37,577. Males had a median income of $28,170 versus $20,087 for females. The per capita income for the county was $15,286. About 11.30% of families and 15.10% of the population were below the poverty line, including 17.00% of those under age 18 and 25.40% of those age 65 or over.

== Communities ==
=== Cities ===
- Lafayette (county seat)
- Red Boiling Springs

=== Unincorporated communities ===
- Beech Bottom
- Beech Hill
- Hillsdale
- Siloam
- Webbtown
- Willette

== Transportation ==
=== Highways ===
- SR 10
- SR 52
- SR 56
- SR 80
- SR 141
- SR 151
- SR 261
- SR 262

=== Airport ===
Lafayette Municipal Airport

== Politics ==
United States presidential election results for Macon County, Tennessee
Year	Republican		Democratic		Third party(ies)	
Year	No.	%	No.	%	No.	%
1912	1,251	56.05%	787	35.26%	194	8.69%
1916	1,600	62.02%	980	37.98%	0	0.00%
1920	3,208	75.02%	1,066	24.93%	2	0.05%
1924	1,808	71.97%	689	27.43%	15	0.60%
1928	1,937	82.22%	419	17.78%	0	0.00%
1932	1,123	55.65%	885	43.86%	10	0.50%
1936	1,402	61.22%	876	38.25%	12	0.52%
1940	1,730	70.76%	711	29.08%	4	0.16%
1944	2,322	76.26%	701	23.02%	22	0.72%
1948	1,708	68.05%	738	29.40%	64	2.55%
1952	2,602	69.20%	1,158	30.80%	0	0.00%
1956	2,207	66.96%	1,069	32.43%	20	0.61%
1960	2,829	74.80%	915	24.19%	38	1.00%
1964	1,846	56.08%	1,446	43.92%	0	0.00%
1968	2,173	58.04%	530	14.16%	1,041	27.80%
1972	2,295	75.67%	653	21.53%	85	2.80%
1976	2,063	50.93%	1,951	48.16%	37	0.91%
1980	2,925	58.96%	1,947	39.25%	89	1.79%
1984	3,330	65.23%	1,747	34.22%	28	0.55%
1988	2,962	65.37%	1,538	33.94%	31	0.68%
1992	2,299	40.15%	2,961	51.71%	466	8.14%
1996	2,481	48.03%	2,240	43.36%	445	8.61%
2000	3,366	51.86%	3,059	47.13%	66	1.02%
2004	4,670	62.83%	2,738	36.84%	25	0.34%
2008	5,145	69.90%	2,060	27.99%	155	2.11%
2012	5,260	76.18%	1,552	22.48%	93	1.35%
2016	6,263	83.46%	1,072	14.29%	169	2.25%
2020	8,096	85.34%	1,307	13.78%	84	0.89%
2024	8,958	86.69%	1,277	12.36%	98	0.95%

Although part of the Middle Tennessee Grand Division, Macon County is geographically firmly a part of Kentucky's Pennyroyal Plateau and has much more historically in common with adjacent Bluegrass State counties like Monroe, Clinton and Cumberland, or with counties in East Tennessee. Those Pennyroyal counties were overwhelmingly opposed to secession, and a large majority of residents fought their Civil War in Union blue rather than Confederate gray. Consequently, after the Civil War, Macon County became an isolated powerfully Republican County in then-Democratic Middle Tennessee. Since 1884, the only Democratic presidential candidate to carry Macon County has been Bill Clinton in 1992, when he had Tennessee Senator Al Gore – who lived in neighbouring Smith County as a child – as his running mate. In the 2000 election, Gore's local popularity was sufficient to give him the third-highest Democratic percentage of the past 132 years despite losing the state, but since then like all of Appalachia and surrounding regions the county has shown an extremely rapid trend to the Republican Party due to powerful opposition to the Democratic Party's liberal views on social issues.

In other statewide elections, Macon County has shown a similar rapid Republican trend. It voted for a Democratic Senator as recently as the 2002 election, when Bob Clement defeated Lamar Alexander by a mere nineteen votes, but for the last three senatorial elections the Democratic candidate has not obtained more than 23.36 percent of the county's vote, with the top performer in those three being former Governor Phil Bredesen in 2018. Although Bredesen carried the county in both 2002 and 2006, he is the last Democratic gubernatorial candidate to top thirty percent.

=== County government officials ===
- County Mayor: Steve Jones
- Assessor of Property: Rick Shoulders
- Trustee: Kim Parks
- Sheriff: Joey Wilburn
- County Clerk: Connie Blackwell
- Register of Deeds: Cynthia Jones

=== County commission members ===
- Phillip Snow
- Todd Gentry
- Keith Newberry
- Mike Jenkins
- Benton Bartley
- Ethan Phillips
- Billy Wilmore
- Justin Dyer
- Dan Hill
- Barry Marshall
- Tony Wix
- Michael Slayton
- Jeff Hughes
- Barry King
- Bobby Ray King
- Kyle Petty
- Wendell Jones
- Jarhea Wilmore
- Helen Hesson
- Larry West

=== State and federal representation ===
- State Representative: Kelly Keisling
- State Senator: Mark Pody
- Congressional Representative: John Rose

== Media ==
=== Newspapers ===
- Macon County Chronicle
- Macon County Times

=== Radio ===
- WEEN 1460 AM and 97.5 FM
- WLCT 102.1 FM

=== Television ===
Macon County is part of the Nashville media market. North Central Telephone Cooperative is the main cable television provider in the county.

== See also ==
- National Register of Historic Places listings in Macon County, Tennessee
