= Ween (disambiguation) =

Ween is an American rock band.

Ween may also refer to:

- Dean Ween, a member of rock band Ween
- Gene Ween, a member of rock band Ween
- WEEN, a radio station (1460 kHz) in Lafayette, Tennessee, United States
- Halloween, a Western Christian celebration
- The Prophecy (game), also known as Ween: The Prophecy, a video game

== See also ==
- Wean
