= Hillsdale, Tennessee =

Unincorporated community in Tennessee, US

Coordinates: 36.446°N 86.058°W

Hillsdale is an unincorporated community in Macon County in the U.S. state of Tennessee.

== History ==
In the late 19th and early 20th century, Hillsdale was a bustling, largely agricultural community, with schools, a post office, and several retail stores and establishments.

Beginning in the late 1950s, as agriculture became less profitable in comparison to manufacturing and service industries, Hillsdale became less populated, and most of the businesses, including the post office, closed. Many of its citizens moved to larger towns and cities. Hillsdale is located between the towns of Hartsville to the south and Lafayette to the north. The Masonic Lodge in Hillsdale still stands on Hillsdale Circle and is an active organization in the community.

== Geography ==
Tennessee State Highway 10 is the main roadway through Hillsdale. Other primary roads include Hillsdale Circle, Taylor Branch Lane, Dry Branch Road, Pumpkin Branch Road and Rock Crusher Road.
