= Beech Bottom =

Beech Bottom may refer to:

- Beech Bottom, Tennessee, an unincorporated community in the United States
- Beech Bottom, West Virginia, an unincorporated community in the United States
- Beech Bottom Dyke, an ancient dyke in the United Kingdom
