= WLCT =

- Lafayette, Tennessee; United States
- Frequency: 102.1 MHz
- Branding: Country 102.1 FM

Programming
- Format: Country
- Affiliations: Fox News Radio, Westwood One

Ownership
- Owner: Lafayette Broadcasting Co., Inc.
- Sister stations: WEEN

History
- Former call signs: WAHE (1994)

Technical information
- Licensing authority: FCC
- Facility ID: 29291
- Class: A
- ERP: 6,000 watts
- HAAT: 99.0 meters (324.8 ft)
- Transmitter coordinates: 36°32′6.00″N 86°0′27.00″W

Links
- Public license information: Public file; LMS
- Webcast: Listen live
- Website: wlct.com

WLCT (102.1 FM, "Country 102.1 FM") is a radio station broadcasting a country music format. Licensed to Lafayette, Tennessee, United States, the station is currently owned by Lafayette Broadcasting Co., Inc. and features programming from Fox News Radio and Westwood One.

== Programming ==
In addition to is usual country music playlist, WLCT also broadcasts Tennessee Volunteers football game broadcasts by the IMG College-operated Vol Network.

WLCT also broadcasts Macon County High School football and basketball. Hourly news updates at the top of each hour are provided by Fox News Radio. The audio of the station is also heard in the background of North Central Telephone Cooperative cable channel 15.
