= Counts Hotel =

- Count Hotel
- U.S. National Register of Historic Places
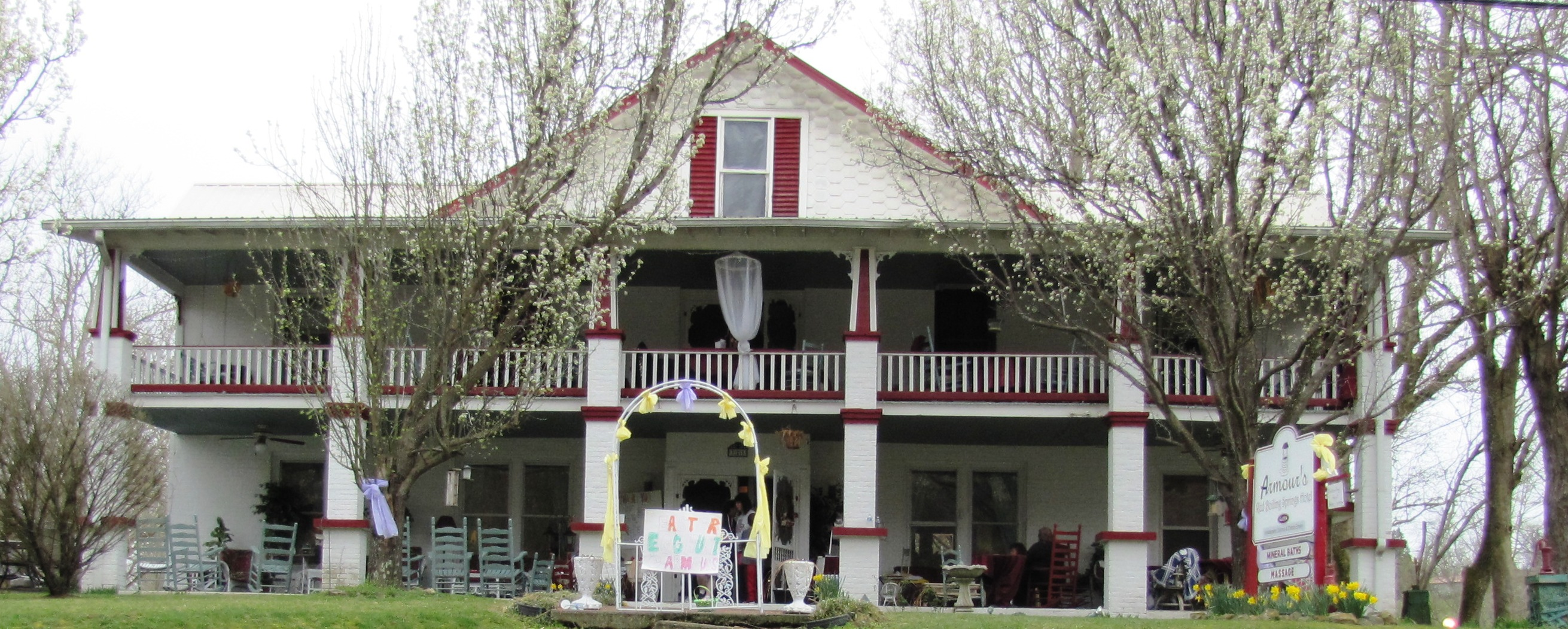
- The NRHP-listed Armour's Hotel, formerly the Counts Hotel.

- Location within Tennessee Location within the United States
- Location: 321 East Main Street, Red Boiling Springs, Tennessee
- Coordinates: 36°31′49″N 85°50′51″W
- Area: 2.7 acres (1.1 ha)
- Built: 1924
- Architect: John Smith
- Architectural style: Colonial Revival
- MPS: Early Twentieth Century Resort Buildings of Red Boiling Springs
- NRHP reference No.: 86002856
- Added to NRHP: September 11, 1986

Armour's Hotel, formerly the Counts Hotel, is a historic hotel on East Main Street in Red Boiling Springs, Tennessee, United States. Built in 1924, this is one of three hotels remaining from the early-20th century resort boom at Red Boiling Springs. In 1986, it was added to the National Register of Historic Places along with the Donoho Hotel and the Thomas House. Armour's Hotel is the only Red Boiling Springs hotel still offering the mineral springs services that made this area an attraction in the 1890s and early 20th century. It is also currently among the two remaining historic hotels in Red Boiling Springs as of 2025, along with the Thomas House.

== Description ==
The hotel is an example of Colonial Revival architecture, constructed of locally produced brick. Although at its peak there were additional buildings to boost occupancy, the original structure has only 24 guest rooms. The hotel was built in a T-shape, featuring a full-length two-storey porch facing northeast along the 61-foot front of the building, with two-storey columns of brick and wood. It has a metal gable roof, with wide eaves supported by vertical wood brackets, and wood shingles decorating the gable ends. Eleven guest rooms are on the first floor. There is a cherry wood stairway to the second floor, which includes 15 guest rooms. Access to the upstairs guest rooms is from an interior hallway, and only one downstairs guest room has an external door, which allows access to a southeast-facing sun porch. Each guest room has an individual bathroom. In addition, there is a bathhouse with twin claw-foot bath tubs for mineral water baths.

== History ==
The 1880s saw a boom in the development of mineral springs resorts as summer destinations, inspired by the success of Saratoga Springs, New York. Early in this decade, New York businessman James F. O. Shaughnessy purchased the Red Boiling Springs tract and began development of the area as a resort.

Counts Hotel was built on a bank overlooking the creek in 1924. The Red Boiling Springs resort was at its peak, with six hotels each having about 50 or 60 rooms, and all including three Southern-style meals each day with the price of the room. There were also at least nine boarding houses. The hotel was first called Smith's Brick Hotel, being the first brick hotel in the area. It gained the Counts Hotel name when it was purchase by Henry Counts in the 1940s. Counts installed modern luxuries: plumbing, electricity, and ensuite bathrooms for each room.

Of the original five types of mineral water available at the resort, three types were available on the Counts Hotel property: "white," "red" and "black." One of the two doctors in the town would prescribe the appropriate water and dosage to each guest. The "white" water was recommended to aid digestion. The sulfurous "red" water was said to be helpful for the bladder and for Bright's disease. The sulfur and magnesium "black" water was claimed to treat the stomach and liver.

It remained open in 1952, when only Cloyd Hotel and Counts Hotel were still operating, and has been open almost continuously. Today, it is the only hotel which still offers the traditional mineral water baths.
