= Beech Hill, Macon County, Tennessee =

Unincorporated community in Tennessee, US

Coordinates: 36°28′16″N 86°06′23″W

Beech Hill is an unincorporated community in Macon County, in the U.S. state of Tennessee.

== History ==
The community was likely named from the presence of beech trees near the town site.
