= Red Boiling Springs, Tennessee =

- City
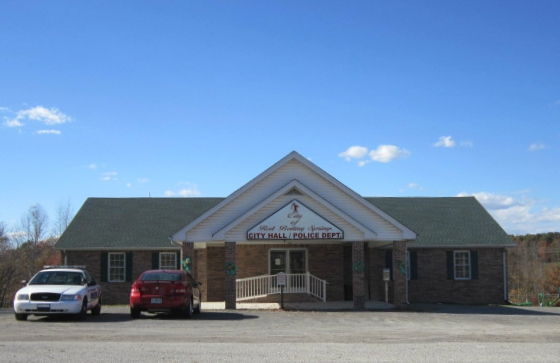
- City Hall

- Location of Red Boiling Springs in Macon County, Tennessee.
- Coordinates: 36°31′57″N 85°50′59″W
- Country: United States
- State: Tennessee
- County: Macon
- Established: 1829
- Incorporated: 1953
- Named for: Area mineral springs

Area
  - Total: 1.75 sq mi (4.53 km^{2})
  - Land: 1.75 sq mi (4.53 km^{2})
  - Water: 0 sq mi (0.00 km^{2})
- Elevation: 771 ft (235 m)

Population (2020)
  - Total: 1,205
  - Density: 688.6/sq mi (265.88/km^{2})
- Time zone: UTC-6 (Central (CST))
  - Summer (DST): UTC-5 (CDT)
- ZIP code: 37150
- Area code: 615
- FIPS code: 47-62000
- GNIS feature ID: 1299039
- Website: www.redboilingspringstn.com

Red Boiling Springs is a city in Macon County, Tennessee, United States. The population was 1,205 at the 2020 census.

== History ==
=== Founding ===
The area was originally known as Salt Lick Creek due to a salt lick that was located approximately four miles northwest of current day Red Boiling Springs. The salt lick attracted animals, American Indians, and other people. Among the people who came to hunt the animal trails was Daniel Boone, who reportedly carved his name and the year 1775 into a beech tree in a nearby community.

The area was first surveyed, and land grants were first awarded in the mid-1780s. The first post office was established in 1829 and named the Salt Lick Creek post office. In 1847, the post office was renamed "Red Boiling Springs." Sometime in the 1830s, a farmer named Jesse Jones noticed red-colored sulphur water bubbling up from springs on his farm. In 1844, a businessman named Samuel Hare, realizing the springs' commercial potential, purchased a 20-acre (8.1 ha) plot of the Jones farm surrounding the springs, and constructed an inn. The inn's remote location and the region's poor roads likely doomed the venture, and the inn was gone by the 1870s.

Aunt Sooky's Salve was a widely distributed product that was manufactured in Red Boiling Springs under the supervision of 'Aunt' Sooky Goad, who also claimed to be the original discoverer of the benefits of the Red Boiling Springs water. Early in life, she had dropsy and claimed to be cured by drinking the sulphur water. In 1914, a Nashville man wrote an article stating that Shepherd Kiby (Kirby), the brother of Goad, discovered that washing his eyes with the spring water reduced eye irritation, but Goad's use of the water seems to have preceded that of Kirby.

=== Tourist attraction ===
In 1873, a stagecoach line was established between Red Boiling Springs and Gallatin, where there was a railroad stop. This likely led to renewed commercial interest in the springs, and by 1876, a general store owner named James Bennett had purchased the springs tract and had built a hotel. Bennett's hotel consisted of a row of log cabins flanking a central frame dining hall. In the late 1870s, Nashville newspapers first started mentioning Bennett's hotel and its guests' activities, as it was vogue during the Gilded Age for newspapers to report on daily happenings at upper class and upper-middle class resorts.

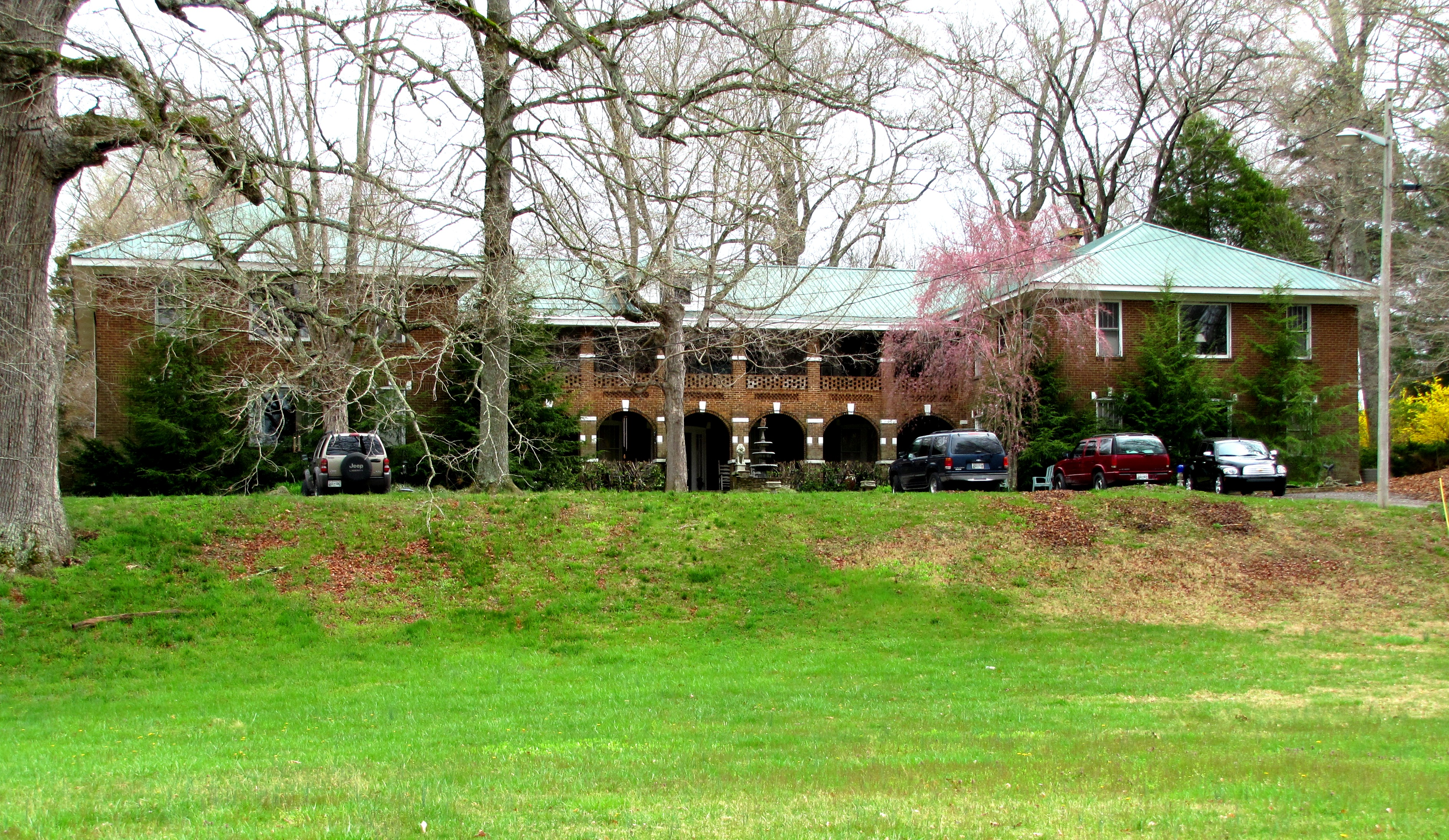
The Thomas House, formerly the Cloyd Hotel

The 1880s saw a boom in the development of mineral springs resorts as "summer getaways," due in part to the publicity received by places such as Saratoga Springs in New York. During this decade, New York businessman James F. O. Shaugnesy purchased the Red Boiling Springs tract and began development of the area as a resort. In 1889, the town first made the Nashville newspapers' front pages when former Tennessee Governor John C. Brown died of a hemorrhage at one of the hotels. The papers emphasized that due to the isolation of the town and a lack of a telephone or telegraph, there was no way to get help. During the following decade, a railroad line was extended to Hartsville, and the railroad established a stagecoach line to Red Boiling Springs. With the continued rise in the number of visitors, two local general store owners— Zack and Clay Cloyd— opened the Cloyd Hotel during this period.

In 1905, several investors formed the Red Boiling Springs Water and Realty Company, and the following year purchased the original springs tract from Shaughnesy. By 1916, the company had replaced Shaughnesy's hotel with a lavish 64-room structure named "The Palace." During this same period, road improvements allowed the stagecoach lines to be replaced with automobile taxis, reducing the travel time from the railroad to just three hours. In 1918, there were four hotels in town— the Palace, the Cloyd, the Donoho, and the Central Hotel; a decade later, that number doubled and soon after, over a dozen hotels and at least that many boarding houses had been erected to take advantage of tourism. The hotels all followed a similar design plan— two stories with elegant verandas spanning the facade and interiors containing large dining halls and 50 to 60 rooms (some later doubled or tripled their roomspace with annexes).

While most mineral water resorts fell out of favor as medical science began to question the healing properties of mineral springs, Red Boiling Springs persisted, reaching its peak in the 1920s and 1930s. The resort was visited by many famous personages in the first half of the 20th century. The hotel registers included the names of judges, lawyers, heads of business and industry, famous musicians and singers, and politicians, among them Jo Byrns; Al Gore, Sr.; Nathan Bachman; Secretary of State Cordell Hull, who sent a beautiful French tapestry that hung in the main lobby of the Donoho Hotel; and most notably President Woodrow Wilson. Although the Great Depression destroyed many Americans' disposable incomes and hence budget for travel, Red Boiling Springs still had large numbers of visitors. The Summer of 1936 brought over 14,000 people to the little hamlet of approximately 800.

=== The mineral springs and daily life in the resort period ===
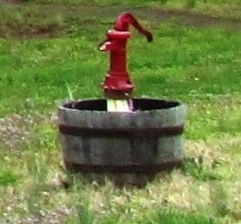
Mineral springs pump

Almost uniquely, five different types of mineral waters are found at Red Boiling Springs. These springs are "mineralized" by their contact with exposed black shale, from which iron sulfate is dissolved into the waters. Some were named for the color they would turn a silver coin; two, dubbed "Red" and "Black", were from springs which were capped off and then piped throughout the town to a series of wells with manually operated pumps on both public and private property. Along with iron and sulphur, Red and Black waters both contained relatively high amounts of calcium and magnesium. The flavor of the "Red" water was only somewhat sulfurous and seemed to be at least slightly agreeable to many; the "Black" was very-strongly flavored, off-putting to the novice, and an acquired taste (at best) for most. "White" was used only to cure dyspepsia. "Freestone" water contained none of the trace minerals that brought the crowds to the springs but it was by far the most palatable. The most mineralized water, known as "Double and Twist," was named for the effect it had on the person drinking it. "Double and Twist" was advertised as the "only water of its kind in the United States."

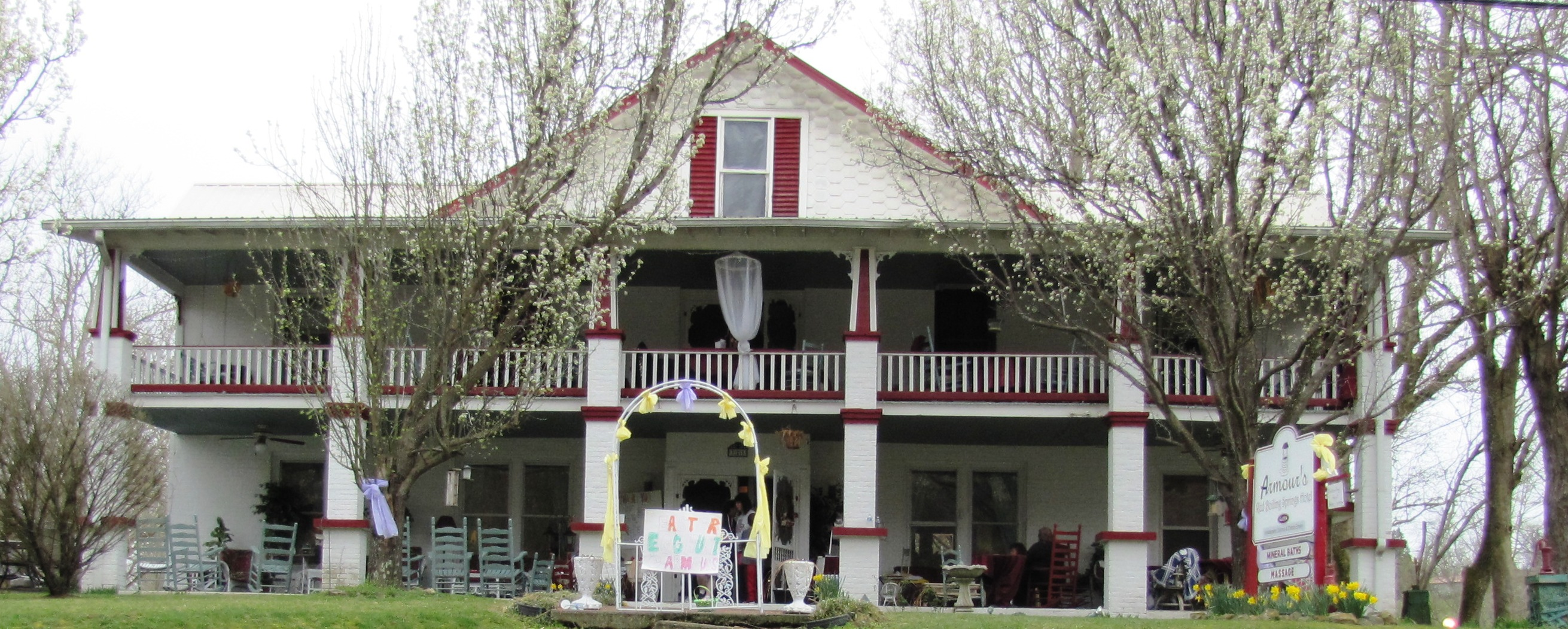
Armour's Hotel, formerly the Counts Hotel

"Taking the waters" at Red Boiling Springs generally consisted of more than merely ingesting them; steam and tub baths featuring the waters and their alleged therapeutic properties were often featured. The bathhouses followed the hydrotherapy regimen developed by John Harvey Kellogg at his Battle Creek Sanitarium in Michigan, which was very popular at the time. The various waters contained several minerals but sulfur was predominant, giving the waters the scent (and some would say, the flavor) of rotten eggs. There were medical doctors on hand to prescribe which treatments would work for a particular ailment. The mineral waters, either from ingesting them or bathing in them, were touted as cures for diseases such as dyspepsia, hydropsy, diabetes, rheumatism, neuralgia, kidney stones, gonorrhea, and various eye and skin diseases. An advertising brochure claimed "sickness among the year 'round residents is practically an unknown thing."

As the resort grew, it became the stopping point for minstrel shows, circuses and other entertainments to a far greater degree than typical for towns of its small size. The town boasted a number of "diversions": bowling alleys, tennis courts, shuffle board, croquet, a ballroom, swimming pools, a small golf course, theatre, and an amusement park. The hotels also provided picnics and barbecues. Dancing was the most popular nighttime activity, and many of the hotels had their own orchestras for nightly ballroom dances. String bands also frequented the town, playing mostly at the many taverns scattered around the town's periphery.

=== Decline ===
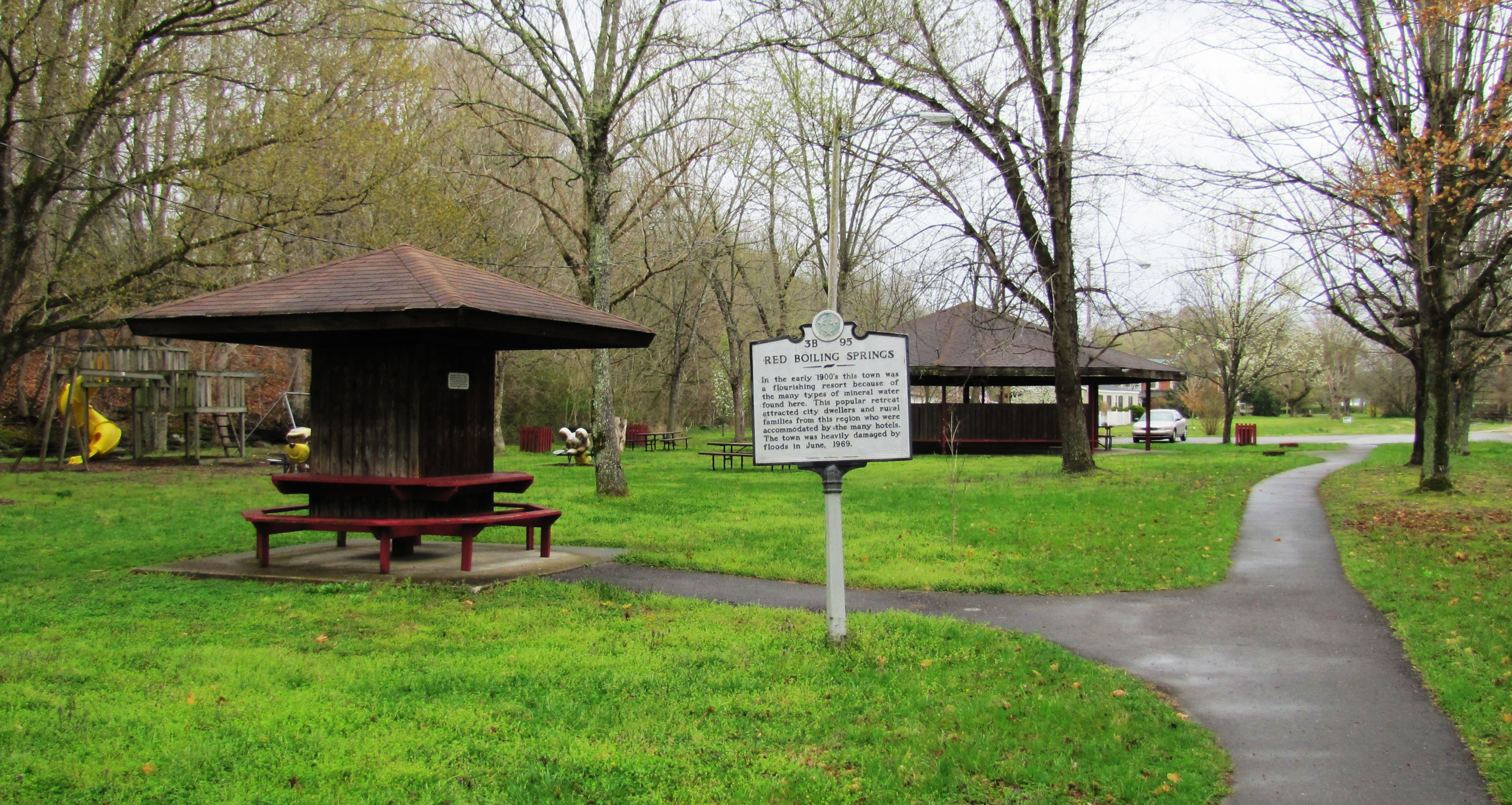
Red Boiling Springs park

Several factors contributed to the town's decline as a major resort. One was a general loss of confidence and interest in the purportedly curative powers of mineral waters by Americans as the 20th century progressed. A new highway system made it easier for people to travel, but it also meant they could travel to other places as well, such as the state parks that were opening. Those who had promoted tourism and the mineral resorts had retired or died and the next generation was not as interested. Some of the hotels had been left in the hands of managers that did not reinvest the profits in the upkeep of the buildings. A number of the hotels burned and were not rebuilt. The townspeople were hesitant to support tourism. The area's general remoteness began to work against it; this was greatly aggravated by World War II and the resultant gasoline rationing. Tourism focus shifted within Tennessee to more highly developed areas such as the Great Smoky Mountains National Park.

By the time the postwar period had arrived, most of the hotels had closed and the area was a shell of its former self. There was a slight rebirth during the 1950s. The town was incorporated on April 27, 1953. A booster club was formed, two of the hotels were restored and new attractions were added. A drive-in billed as the only one of its kind in Middle Tennessee outside of Nashville joined the local theatre. By the early '60s only five hotels remained, then, by the end of the decade, it was back down to three. One of the hotels was lost to a fire and a nursing home bearing the name of the original hotel was later erected on the cleared site.

=== 1969 flood ===
At 3:30 AM on the morning of June 23, 1969, raining began. Area newspapers reported that by 6:00 AM, the water had risen "about 5 feet above maximum flood level". In six hours the entire Salt Lick Valley was under water. An unofficial report stated that 10 inches of rain fell in 6 hours. Overall, 15 businesses and 35 houses were either heavily damaged or destroyed, and a Trailways bus had been swept approximately 500 feet into a steel-concrete bridge. Whole houses and many cars floated through town. Two young girls, sisters, Renah Louise Bilbrey, 8, and Jennifer Rae Bilbrey, 2, daughters of Grady and Frances Bilbrey, were killed in the flood. Both girls were found by search parties composed of their relatives and town residents. The girls' uncle was one of the members to find both bodies. One was not found until seven days later after being swept 4 miles downstream. A brother, 5, survived and the Bilbreys went on to have two more children, including a daughter. An aunt who aided in the search later died during childbirth as a result of hepatitis contracted from the flood waters. In the years following this, several sites including a town park, a housing development, and a dam built to prevent another such flood from happening again were named in memory of the two sisters. Many years later, Nashville Channel 4 WSMV meteorologist Nancy VanCamp and team produced a documentary that recounted the events and the family of the girls were interviewed. The documentary resulted in an Emmy award to the station. Two songs about the tragedy were produced, one of which, "The Tragedy of Red Boiling Springs", garnered extensive airplay and resulted in a hit for the producers, artists, and writers involved. The Bilbrey family refused to have anything to do with either record and would not accept any proceeds resulting from sales. The graduating class of the elder sister, Renah, dedicated the annual yearbook to her memory. State and Federal grant money aided businesses, built watershed dams and help the townsfolk rebuild. One dam was named in memory of the young victims. By the late 1970s the town began to revisit its history in earnest with an eye to marketing it a tourist destination again, if only on a small scale. Two covered bridges were built, and park lands were developed. Later, a library was built on the site of a former hotel. A park was constructed in the early 2000s close to the site of the home of the young victims and was named in their memory. A dedication ceremony honored the surviving family members and rescue workers who aided in finding their bodies.

=== Present day ===
At the beginning of the 21st century, a large water bottling plant was built on the outskirts of town by Nestlé, where water is bottled from Bennet Hill Springs, a source of Freestone water. The plant removes all the natural minerals from the water by reverse osmosis and later adds a specific mixture of minerals to give it a consistent taste.

The old hand pumps that stood on public land were made inoperable because of liability issues that could occur. The hand pumps can still be seen on private property around town, and some people still believe in the curative powers of the mineral waters. As of 2019, three of the historic hotels were in operation, with The Armour's Hotel still offering a full complement of steam treatment, mineral tub baths, and therapeutic massage.

One of the surviving hotels has undergone several name changes and two fires, the first fire in the 1920s completely destroyed the structure, but it was rebuilt; the second fire in the 1990s destroyed one wing, which was also rebuilt. Names it has operated under include the Cloyd Hotel, and it is currently known as The Thomas House. The hotel gained notoriety in the early half of the 2010s when it became the subject of the popular SyFy channel television program Ghost Hunters. Monthly "ghost hunts" have since remained a popular tourist attraction for the town.

== Geography ==
Red Boiling Springs is located at 36°31′57″N 85°50′59″W (36.532509, -85.849742).

According to the United States Census Bureau, the city has a total area of 1.4 square miles (3.6 km^{2}), all land.

== Demographics ==
Historical population
| Census | Pop. | Note | %± |
|---|---|---|---|
| 1960 | 597 | | — |
| 1970 | 726 | | 21.6% |
| 1980 | 1,173 | | 61.6% |
| 1990 | 905 | | −22.8% |
| 2000 | 1,023 | | 13.0% |
| 2010 | 1,112 | | 8.7% |
| 2020 | 1,205 | | 8.4% |

=== 2020 census ===
As of the 2020 census, Red Boiling Springs had a population of 1,205, with 329 families residing in the city. The median age was 39.5 years. 25.7% of residents were under the age of 18 and 22.9% of residents were 65 years of age or older. For every 100 females there were 86.5 males, and for every 100 females age 18 and over there were 78.3 males age 18 and over.

0.0% of residents lived in urban areas, while 100.0% lived in rural areas.

There were 430 households in Red Boiling Springs, of which 36.7% had children under the age of 18 living in them. Of all households, 34.9% were married-couple households, 18.1% were households with a male householder and no spouse or partner present, and 37.7% were households with a female householder and no spouse or partner present. About 31.9% of all households were made up of individuals and 13.2% had someone living alone who was 65 years of age or older.

There were 494 housing units, of which 13.0% were vacant. The homeowner vacancy rate was 2.9% and the rental vacancy rate was 5.1%.

Racial composition as of the 2020 census
| Race | Number | Percent |
|---|---|---|
| White | 1,103 | 91.5% |
| Black or African American | 6 | 0.5% |
| American Indian and Alaska Native | 4 | 0.3% |
| Asian | 1 | 0.1% |
| Native Hawaiian and Other Pacific Islander | 1 | 0.1% |
| Some other race | 37 | 3.1% |
| Two or more races | 53 | 4.4% |
| Hispanic or Latino (of any race) | 62 | 5.1% |

=== 2000 census ===
As of the census of 2000, there was a population of 1,023, with 404 households and 252 families residing in the city. The population density was 719.8 inhabitants per square mile (277.9/km^{2}). There were 457 housing units at an average density of 321.6 per square mile (124.2/km^{2}). The racial makeup of the city was 98.14% White, 0.29% Native American, 0.10% Asian, 0.29% from other races, and 1.17% from two or more races. Hispanic or Latino of any race were 1.27% of the population.

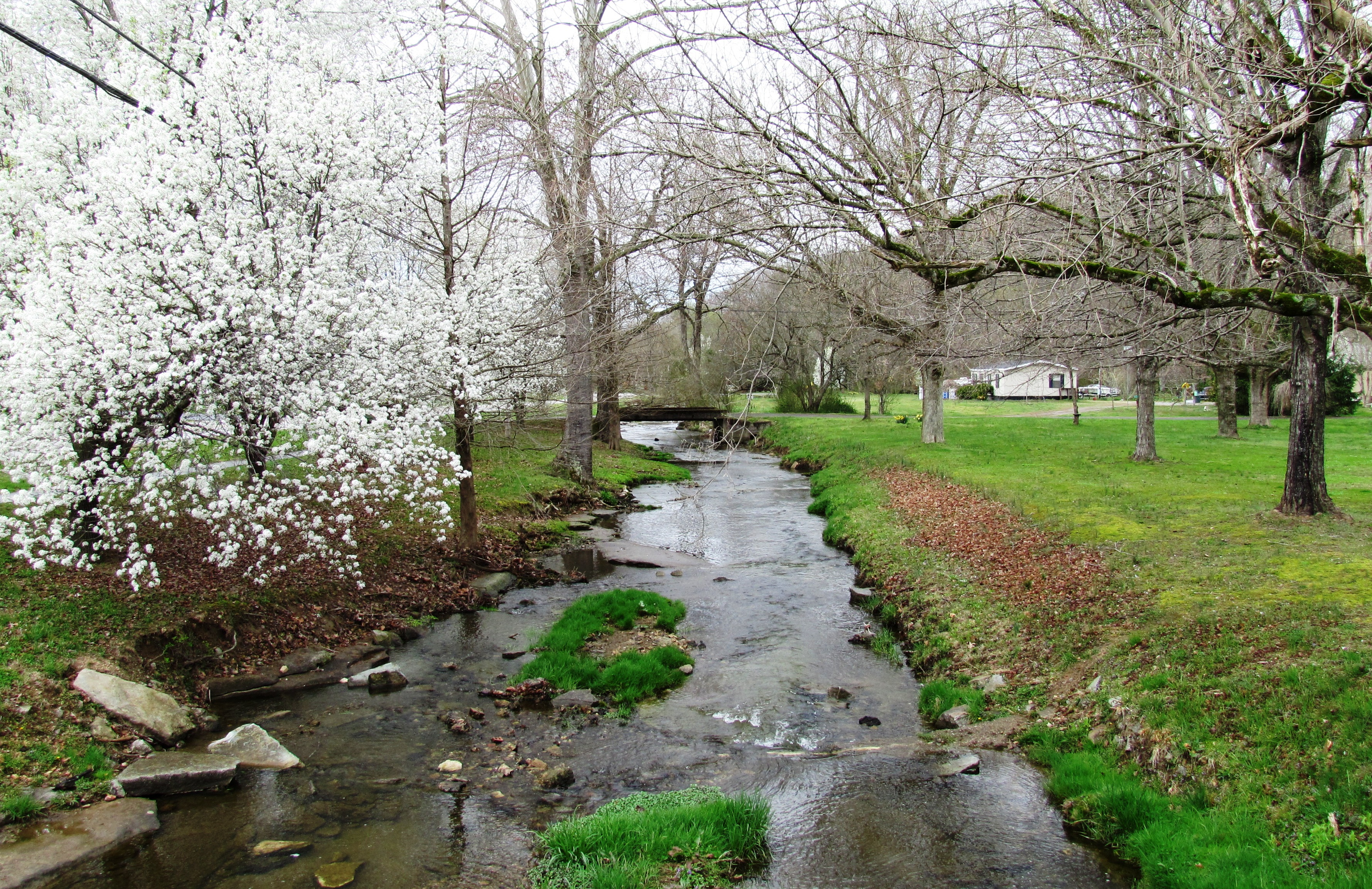
Salt Lick Creek

There were 404 households, out of which 28.0% had children under the age of 18 living with them, 45.3% were married couples living together, 13.9% had a female householder with no husband present, and 37.6% were non-families. 33.4% of all households were made up of individuals, and 15.6% had someone living alone who was 65 years of age or older. The average household size was 2.24 and the average family size was 2.87.

In the city, the population was spread out, with 21.9% under the age of 18, 7.3% from 18 to 24, 23.0% from 25 to 44, 24.2% from 45 to 64, and 23.6% who were 65 years of age or older. The median age was 43 years. For every 100 females, there were 75.2 males. For every 100 females age 18 and over, there were 69.3 males.

The median income for a household in the city was $19,868, and the median income for a family was $28,333. Males had a median income of $26,313 versus $16,842 for females. The per capita income for the city was $14,274. About 18.4% of families and 25.7% of the population were below the poverty line, including 34.2% of those under age 18 and 18.1% of those age 65 or over.

== Education ==
Red Boiling Springs School is a K-12 public institution that is overseen by the Macon County School System. It has 671 total students and 41 teachers, making a student-teacher ratio of 1:16.

The school offers the following sports:

- Basketball
- Baseball
- Softball
- Golf
- Volleyball
- Cheerleading
- Football

== Festivals and attractions ==
The town is home to several annual events. The first Saturday in June brings the Folk Medicine Festival back to the city parks along the banks of the Salt Lick Creek. The goal of the festival is to pass on knowledge, skills and traditions that ensure the survival of folklife activities from old time medicine and natural healing arts to the skills of the home and farm.

One of the biggest annual festivals in Tennessee, The Summer Solstice, attracts around 2,000 people every year for 3 days of camping out on an organic farm listening to live music, and eating fresh organic food. Marked by the 1st day of summer and longest day of the year the celebration is usually put off until the following weekend.

The Red Boiling Springs Volunteer Fire Department hosts their Annual Duck Day Fun-Raiser Festival the Saturday of Labor Day weekend each year. This event is held at The Palace Park starting at 10am until the Rubber Duckies are released to race down Salt Lick Creek at 2pm. The event hosts musical entertainment, local vendors who offer: crafts, food, games & family fun, and the stars of the show The Rubber "Racing" Duckies. Follow them on Facebook for Festival updates and locations where your Racing Duckies can be adopted for the day. The funds raised help "Serve" folks in the area that are down on their luck, in addition to, a variety of projects for the youth & elderly in the area.

The Middle Tennessee Region of the Antique Automobile Club of America holds their antique car show in Red Boiling Springs each year. The event is always scheduled for the first Friday and Saturday after Labor Day and held on the lawn of The Thomas House Hotel. This event has been held for over 50 years.

How'd Dey Do Dat? Day is held the third Saturday in October. It is a rural heritage celebration held just outside city limits on the Ritter Farm with demonstrations of "old time skills", i.e. blacksmith shop, grist mill, horse drawn equipment, quilting, candle making.

The Thomas House Hotel is home to a series of year-round Ghost Hunt Weekends where guests get to search for clues to the paranormal with celebrity ghost hunters, while staying and eating at this historic hotel.
