= Lafayette Municipal Airport (Tennessee) =

- IATA: none; ICAO: none; FAA LID: 3M7

Summary
- Airport type: Public
- Owner: City of Lafayette
- Serves: Lafayette, Tennessee
- Elevation AMSL: 969 ft / 295 m
- Coordinates: 36°31′12″N 086°03′29″W

Map
- Location of airport in Tennessee 3M7 (the United States)

Runways
Direction	Length		Surface
Direction	ft	m	Surface
19/01	5,200	1,585	Asphalt

Statistics (2018)
- Based aircraft: 30

Lafayette Municipal Airport (FAA LID: 3M7) is a city-owned, public-use airport located two nautical miles (3 km) west of the central business district of Lafayette, in Macon County, Tennessee, United States.

== Facilities ==
Lafayette Municipal Airport covers an area of 111 acres (45 ha) at an elevation of 969 feet (295m) above mean sea level. It has one runway designated 01/19 with an asphalt surface measuring 5,200 by 75 feet (1,585 x 23 m).

== See also ==
- List of airports in Tennessee
