= WEEN =

- Lafayette, Tennessee; United States
- Frequency: 1460 kHz
- Branding: "Solid Gospel 1460"

Programming
- Format: Southern Gospel
- Affiliations: Salem Radio Network, Talk Radio Network

Ownership
- Owner: Lafayette Broadcasting Company, Inc.
- Sister stations: WLCT

Technical information
- Licensing authority: FCC
- Facility ID: 36220
- Class: D
- Power: 1,100 watts day 119 watts night
- Transmitter coordinates: 36°32′6.00″N 86°0′27.00″W
- Translators: W248CX (97.5 MHz, Lafayette)

Links
- Public license information: Public file; LMS
- Webcast: WEEN Webstream
- Website: WEEN Online

WEEN (1460 AM, "Solid Gospel 1460") is a radio station broadcasting a Southern Gospel music format. Licensed to Lafayette, Tennessee, United States, the station is currently owned by Lafayette Broadcasting Co., Inc. and features programming from Salem Radio Network and Talk Radio Network.
