= Beech Bottom, Tennessee =

Unincorporated community in Tennessee, US

Coordinates: 36°27′55″N 86°00′29″W

Beech Bottom is an unincorporated community in Macon County, Tennessee, in the United States.

== History ==
The community was named for a grove of beech trees near the low-lying town site.
