= Thomas House Hotel =

- Cloyd Hotel
- U.S. National Register of Historic Places
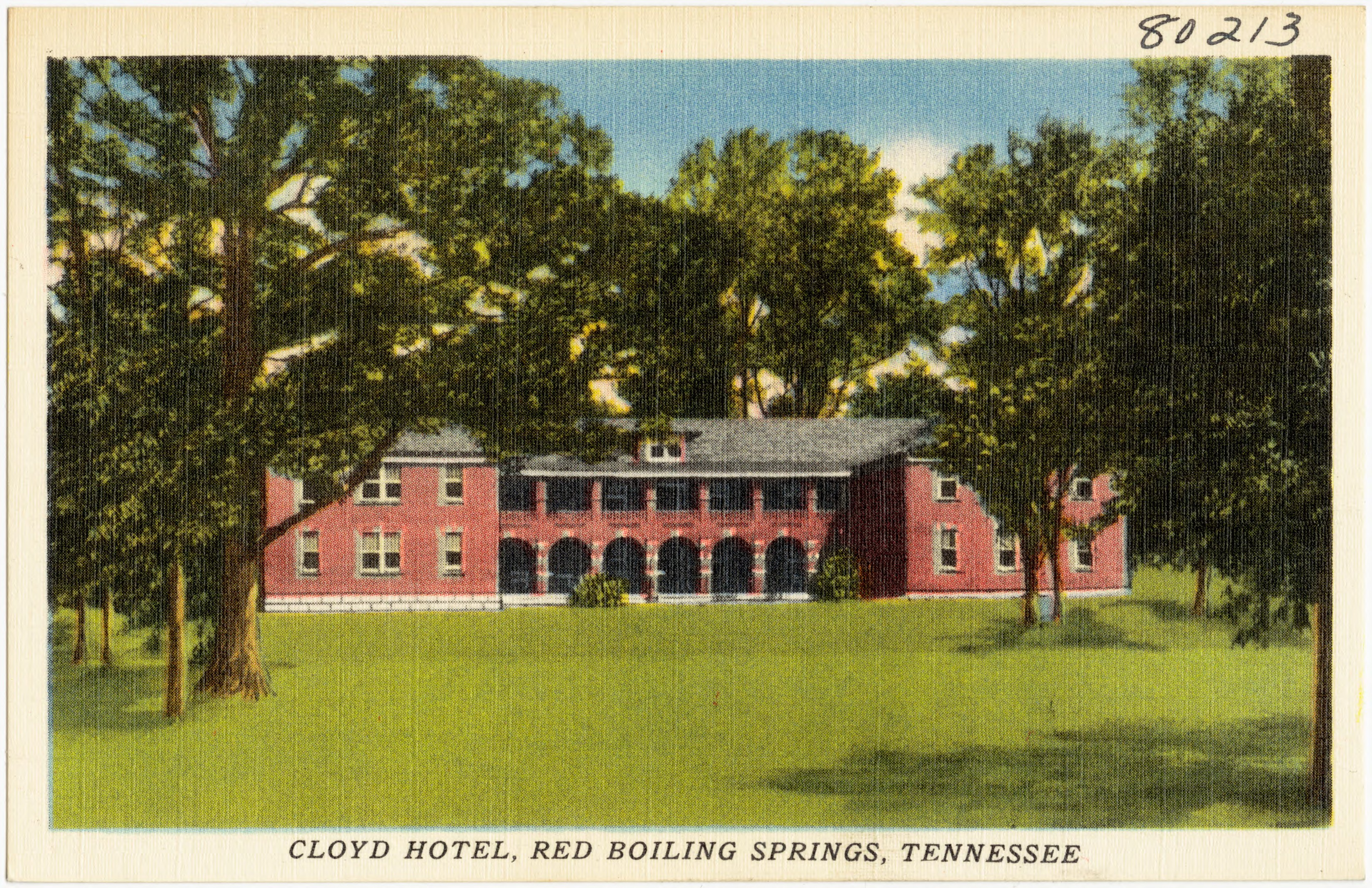
- Postcard from Cloyd Hotel (now Thomas House), between 1930 and 1945.

- Location within Tennessee Location within the United States
- Location: 520 East Main Street, Red Boiling Springs, Tennessee
- Coordinates: 36°31′45″N 85°50′21″W
- Area: 2 acres (0.81 ha)
- Built: 1927
- Architect: Joseph H. Peters
- Architectural style: Early twentieth century resort
- MPS: Early Twentieth Century Resort Buildings of Red Boiling Springs
- NRHP reference No.: 86002855
- Added to NRHP: September 11, 1986

The Thomas House Hotel, formerly the Cloyd Brothers Hotel is a historic hotel on East Main Street in Red Boiling Springs, Tennessee, United States. Built in 1927, Thomas House is one of three hotels remaining from the early-20th century resort boom at Red Boiling Springs. In 1986, it was added to the National Register of Historic Places along with the other two hotels, the Donoho Hotel and Counts Hotel. As of 2025, it is currently among the two remaining historic hotels in the city, alongside the Counts Hotel.

== History ==
The 1880s saw a boom in the development of mineral springs resorts as summer destinations, inspired by the success of Saratoga Springs, New York. Early in this decade, New York businessman James F. O. Shaughnessy purchased the Red Boiling Springs tract and began development of the area as a resort.

To accommodate visitors attracted by the mineral springs, local general store owners Zack and Clay Cloyd built the Cloyd Hotel in 1890. This was a two-storey white weatherboard structure with long two storey verandas, similar to the Donoho Hotel that still stands today. The original Cloyd Hotel was destroyed by fire in 1924, and the current two-storey red brick hotel with portico was built in 1927. A second fire in the 1990s destroyed one wing, which was also rebuilt.

== Haunting ==
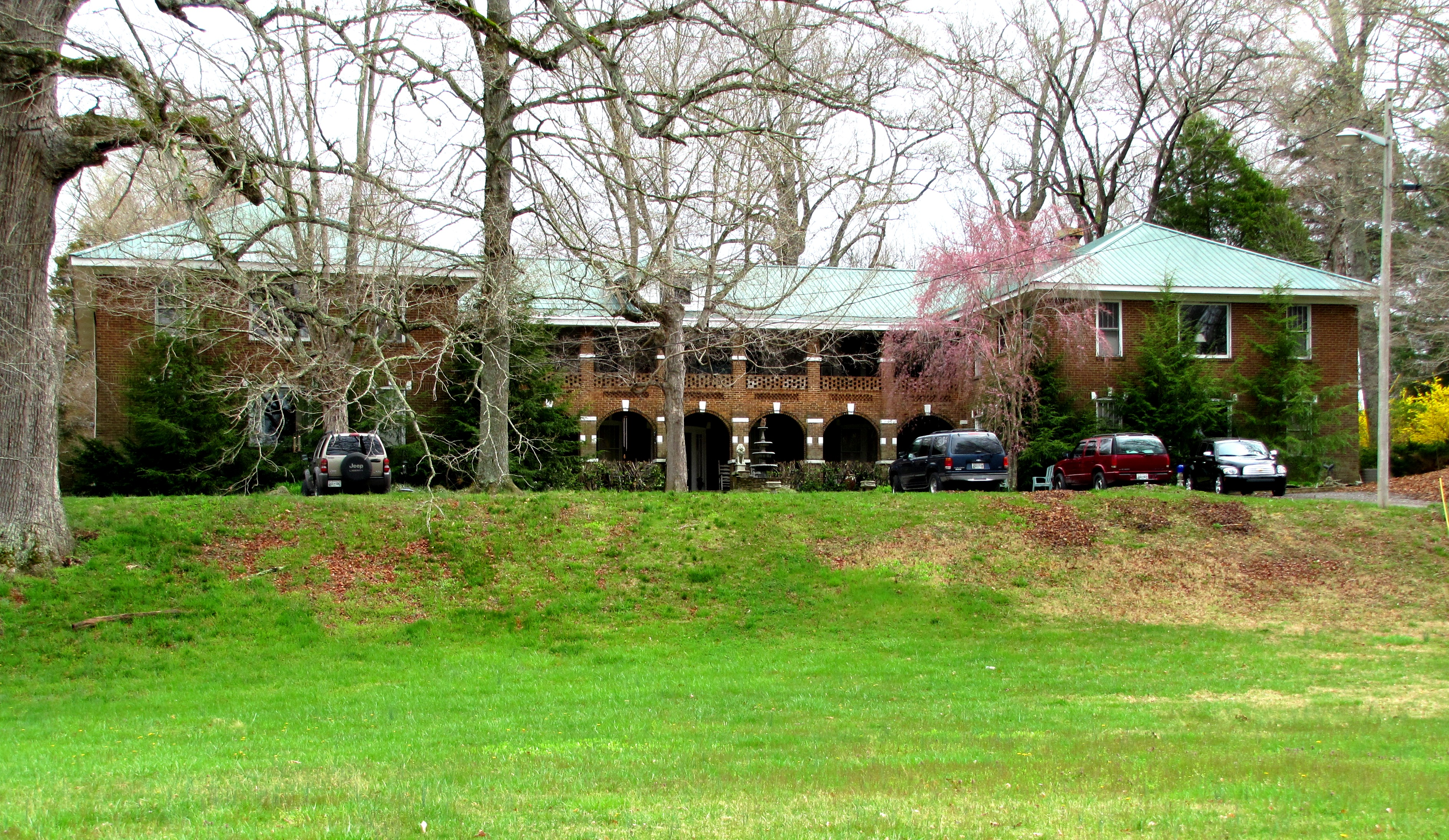
The Thomas House in 2010.

The hotel gained notoriety in the early half of the 2010s when it became the subject of several television programs investigating paranormal activity, including the SyFy channel television program Ghost Hunters. Ghost hunts have since remained a popular tourist attraction for the town. Room 37 is claimed to be the center of the activity. One ghost is said to be the spirit of Sarah Cloyd, the young daughter of one of the Cloyd brothers, and another may be a guest who fell from a horse and drowned in a stream near the property.
