= Donoho Hotel =

- Donoho Hotel Historic District
- U.S. National Register of Historic Places
- U.S. Historic district
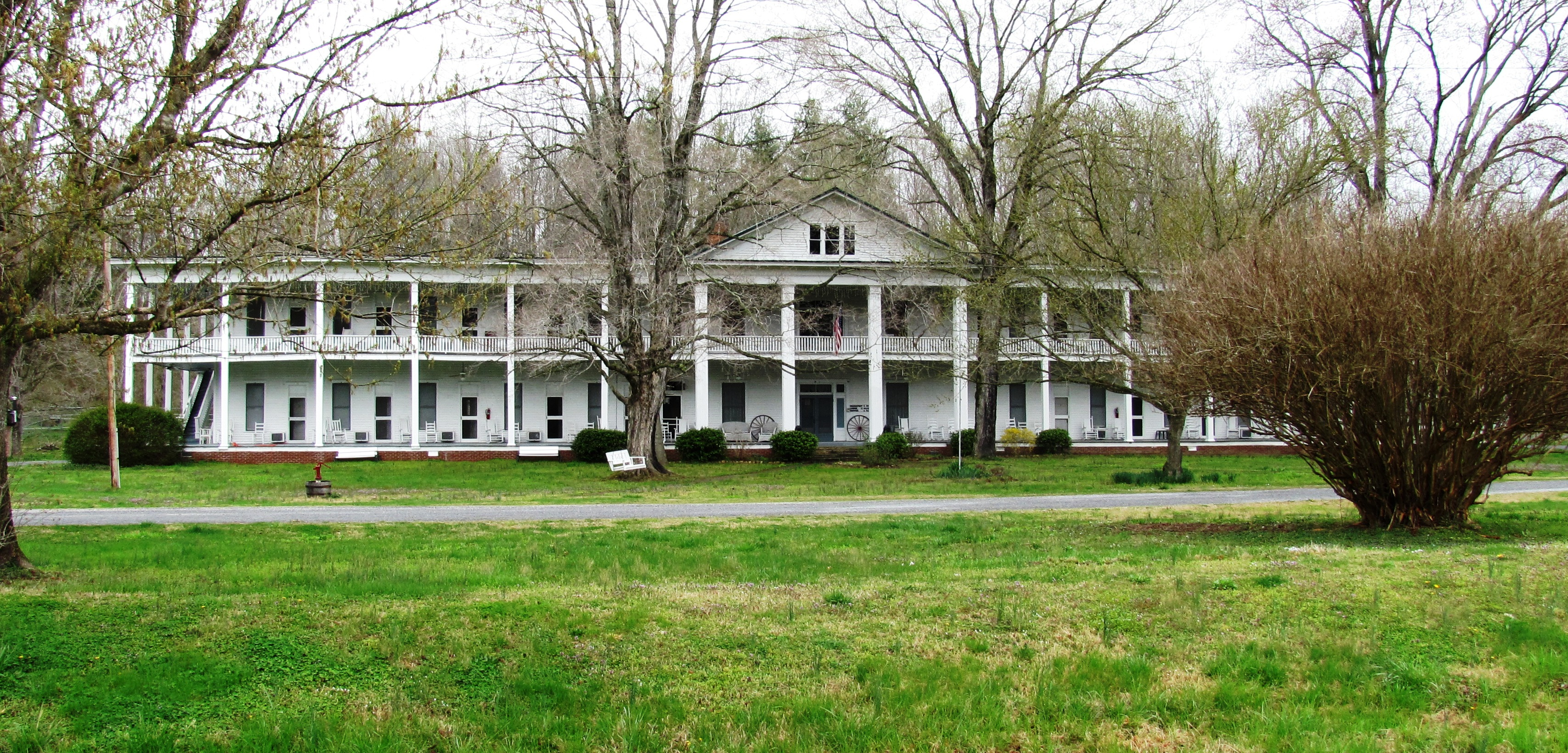
- Donoho Hotel

- Location within Tennessee Location within the United States
- Location: East Main St., Red Boiling Springs, Tennessee
- Coordinates: 36°31′47″N 85°50′28″W
- Area: appx. 4 acres (1.6 ha)
- Built: 1916
- Architect: B. W. Chitwood
- Architectural style: Bungalow, Colonial Revival
- MPS: Early Twentieth Century Resort Buildings of Red Boiling Springs TR
- NRHP reference No.: 86002857
- Added to NRHP: September 11, 1986

The Donoho Hotel was a historic hotel in Red Boiling Springs, Tennessee, United States. Built in 1916, the Donoho was one of three hotels remaining from the early-20th century resort boom at Red Boiling Springs, and the last of the great white frame hotels with full-length two-story verandas. Although it has changed ownership several times, the Donoho had remained in operation continuously since its opening. In 1986, the hotel and several outbuildings were added to the National Register of Historic Places as a historic district.

The mineral springs at Red Boiling Springs— which were thought to have curative powers— were attracting tourists as early as the 1840s. After the Civil War, the nationwide rise in the popularity of mountain spring resorts brought about the development of a large-scale tourist industry at Red Boiling Springs. As transportation to the remote mountain hamlet improved, more elaborate hotels were built, among them the Donoho, which was initially built in the early 1900s. After the first Donoho Hotel burned down, the most recent structure was built as a replacement in 1916. Although alterations were made to the Donoho in the 1950s to provide modern amenities, the hotel appeared much as it did when it was first constructed. In the early morning hours of November 11, 2025, an electrical fire started inside the Donoho. Fire crews from Lafayette, Red Boiling Springs, and Willette, with assistance from the Red Boiling Springs Police Department, Macon County Sheriff's Department, and the Tennessee Highway Patrol, responded to the fire around 7:00 am and began working the scene. The Donoho Hotel which was well known and loved was fully engulfed by flames and was ultimately consumed by the fire.

== Location ==
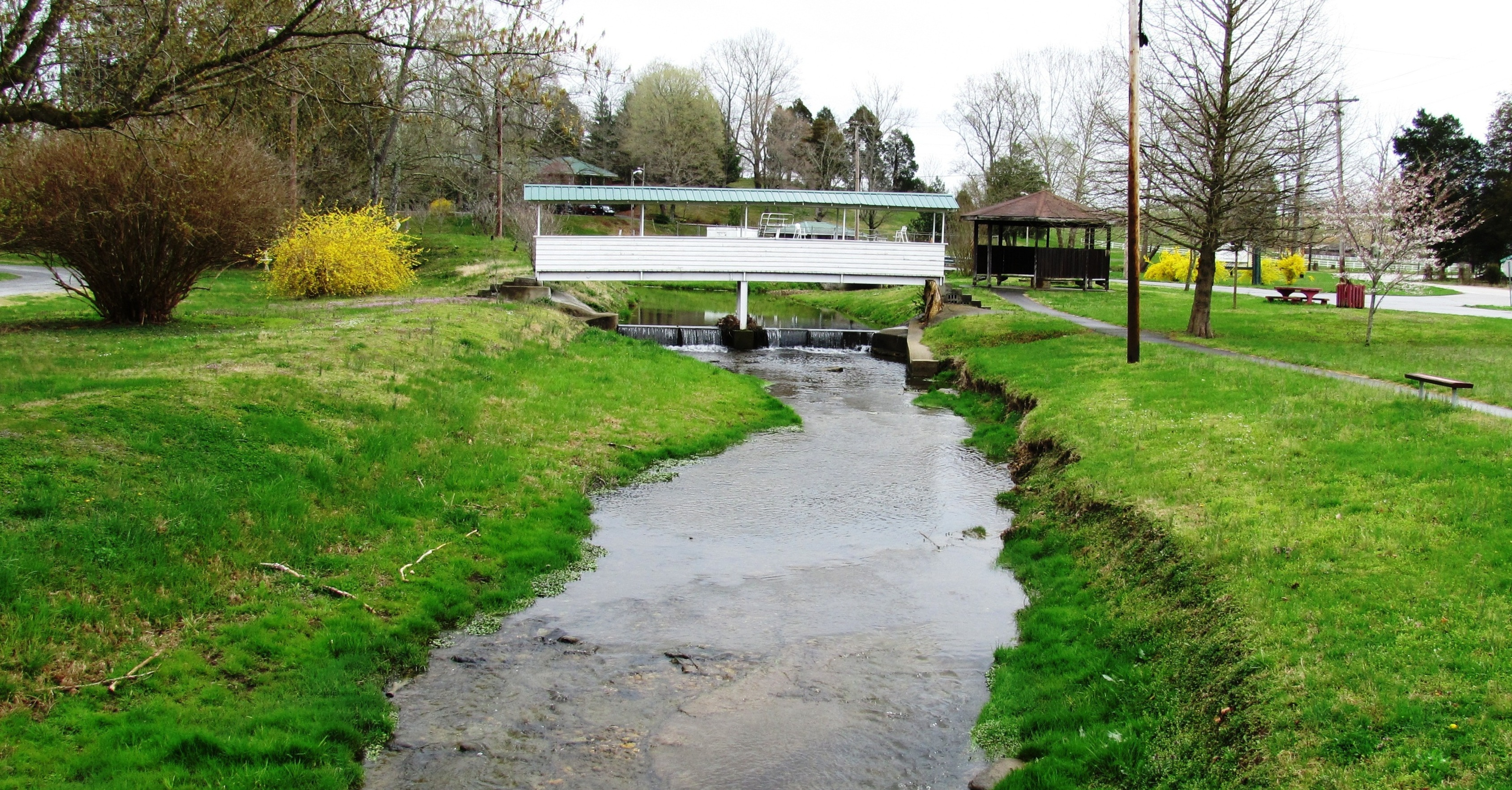
Salt Lick Creek crossing the Donoho's front lawn.

Red Boiling Springs is located amid the Northern Highland Rim, a rugged upland between the Pennyroyal Plateau of Kentucky and the Nashville Basin of Tennessee. Salt Lick Creek, a tributary of the Barren River, slices a narrow valley which was once lined with a dozen hotels and at least as many boarding houses. The Donoho was situated at the base of a hill at the confluence of Jim Hawkins Spring and Whitley Hollow Branch. The NRHP-listed Cloyd Hotel (now the Thomas House) is located across Whitley Hollow Branch to the south. The Donoho faced East Main Street, which runs parallel to the creek. The Red Boiling Springs area is underlain by a type of black shale (Chattanooga shale), which is exposed in some stream beds. As water flows over this shale, it collects and dissolves iron sulfate, giving the area's springs their once-sought after mineral potency. The most mineralized water is very salty, and has a strong hydrogen sulfide odor. Red-painted well pumps scattered throughout the town mark the location of the various mineral springs.

== History ==
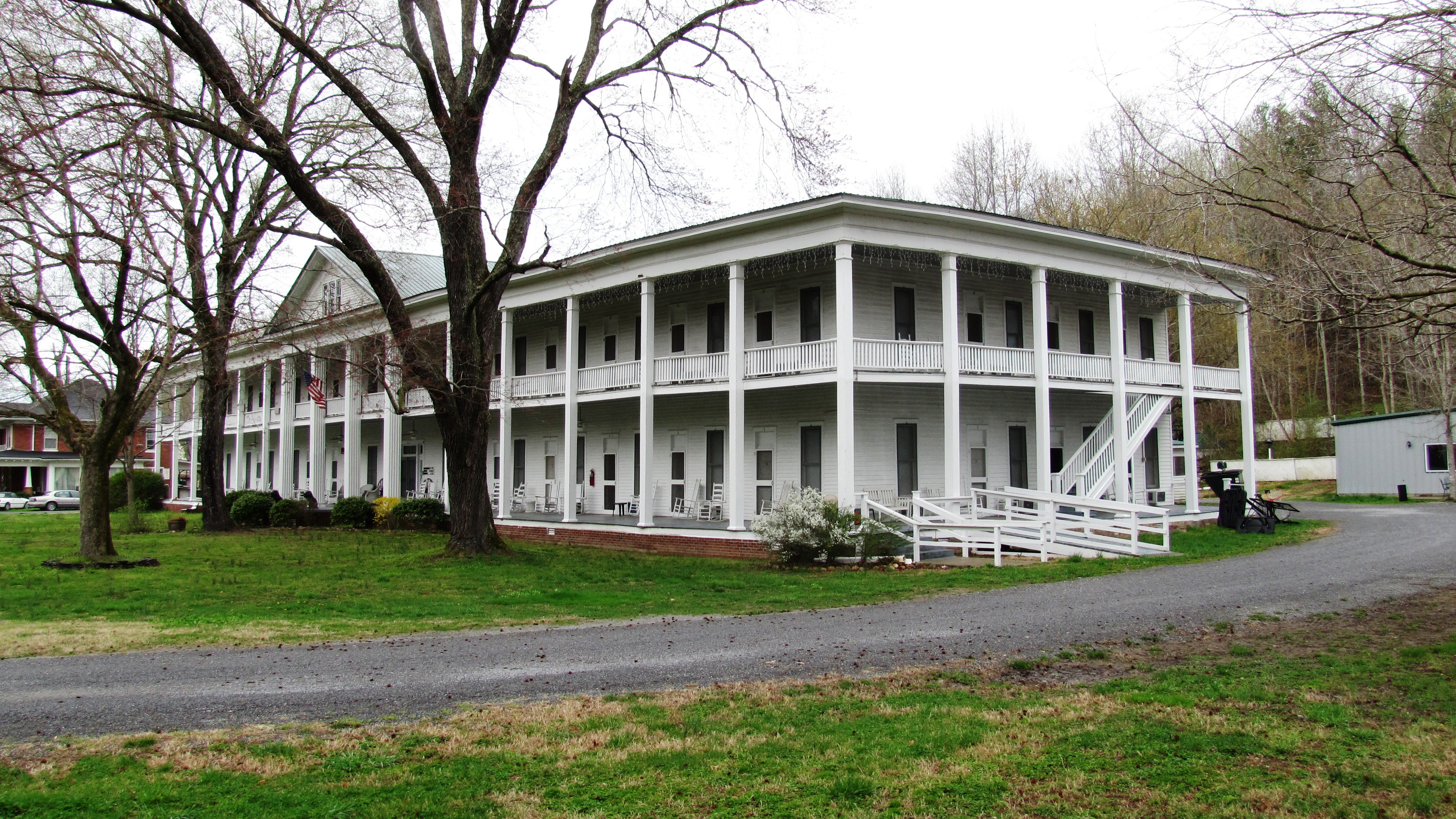
The Donoho, southwest corner

The mineral springs at Red Boiling Springs were discovered sometime in the 1830s, and by 1844 a hotel had been constructed to house tourists visiting the springs. Due to a lack of transportation to the area (and possibly the Civil War), this early resort struggled financially. By the 1870s, however, a new hotel had been built, and with the establishment of a stagecoach line from Gallatin, Red Boiling Springs began to thrive. A nationwide boom in the popularity of spa resorts in the 1880s and the extension of a railroad line to nearby Hartsville in the 1890s brought still more tourists to Red Boiling Springs, and by the early 1900s the town had nine hotels and a dozen or so boarding houses.

A hotel owner named Whitley built the first hotel on what is now the Donoho property sometime in the 1890s. Around 1901, the first hotel known as the "Donoho" was built on the property by Whitley's son-in-law, Squire Donoho (1863–1908), whose family had operated a general store in Red Boiling Springs since the 1880s. After Squire Donoho's death, the hotel and property passed into the hands of Whitley's daughter, Tennie, and her husband, Brady Chitwood (1875–1958). The first Donoho Hotel burned in 1915, and the following year the Chitwoods built the most recent hotel as a replacement.

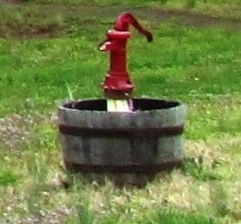
Mineral spring pump

The Donoho, like other hotels in the town, offered five types of water: freestone (unmineralized) water, "White" water, "Red" and "Black" water (high in magnesium and calcium), and the most mineralized, "Double and Twist." Cups of the "Black" water were served as a tonic every morning on the hotel's verandas in its early years. While many believed in the curative effects of the mineral waters, some historians suggest Victorian era tourists merely used health problems as an excuse to take long, recreational vacations. Dancing, bowling, and swimming were common activities. While alcoholic beverages were barred at the Donoho, numerous taverns were scattered around the periphery of Red Boiling Springs.

The Chitwoods managed the Donoho until 1955, when they sold it to Ed Hagen. Hagen made several renovations in hopes of reviving the tourist industry at Red Boiling Springs. The hotel has since had several owners, most notably the Walsh family, who operated the hotel from 1974 to 1993. In 2001 Robert Stroop has bought the hotel.

== Design ==
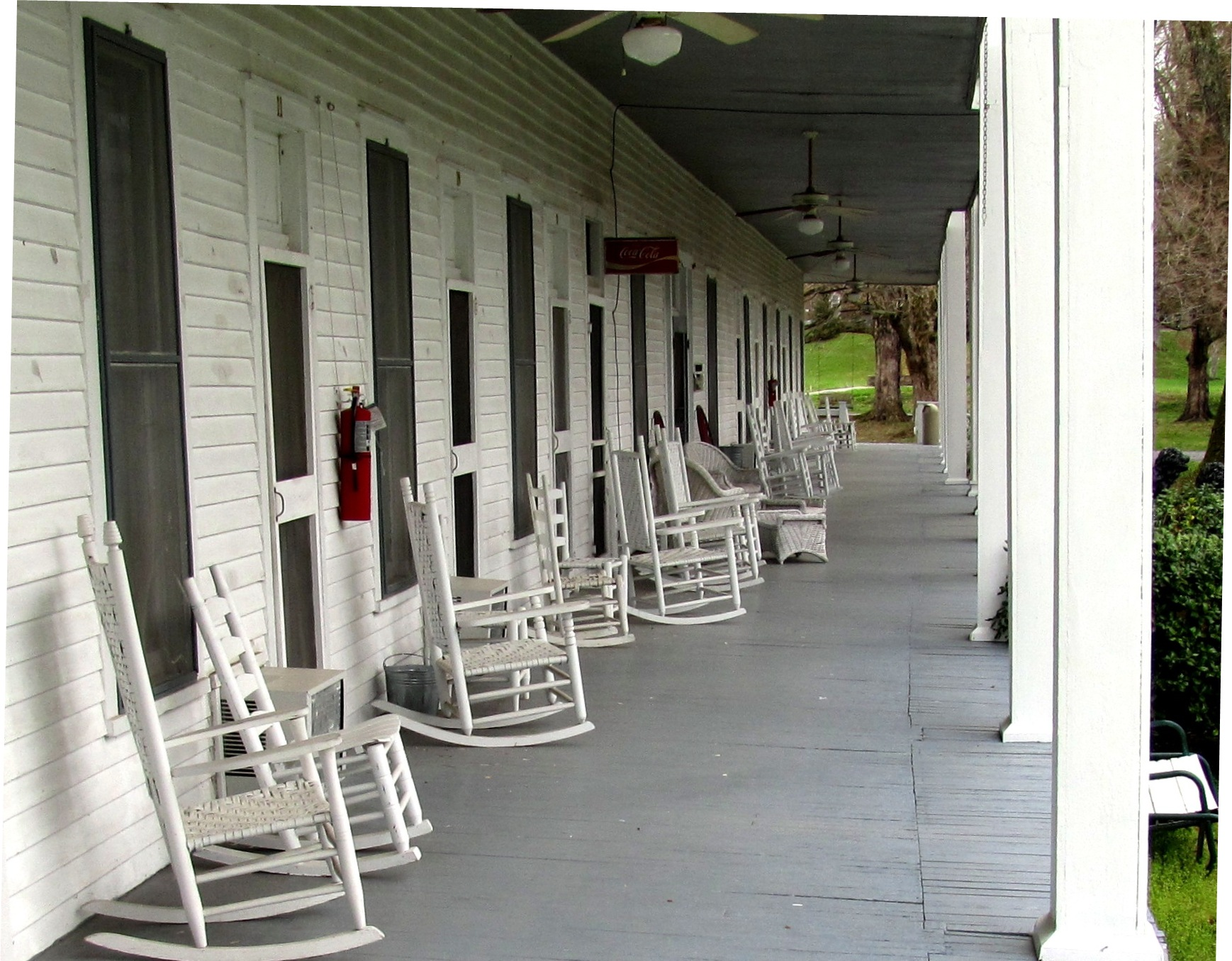
The Donoho's lower veranda

The Donoho Hotel was a two-story weatherboard frame structure resting on a brick foundation. The hotel had an elaborate "T" shape, with the north and south wings hanging from the ends of the T's crossbar, and the rear kitchen wing (added in the 1930s) being the T's base. Verandas spanned the length of the facade and both sides of both stories. The verandas were supported by four large columns (flanking the hotel's entrance) and twenty-two smaller columns, and contained oak tongue and groove floors. All but one of the hotel's rooms were accessible only from the verandas.

The hotel's interior consisted of a hallway which lead to a lobby, a lounge, the lone interior guest room, and a 128-capacity dining room (the dining room was in the stem of the "T"). The rear kitchen wing was accessible from the dining room and from the outside. Along with the kitchen, the rear wing included a room once reserved for the hotel's cook. Private baths were added to most of the guest rooms in the 1950s.

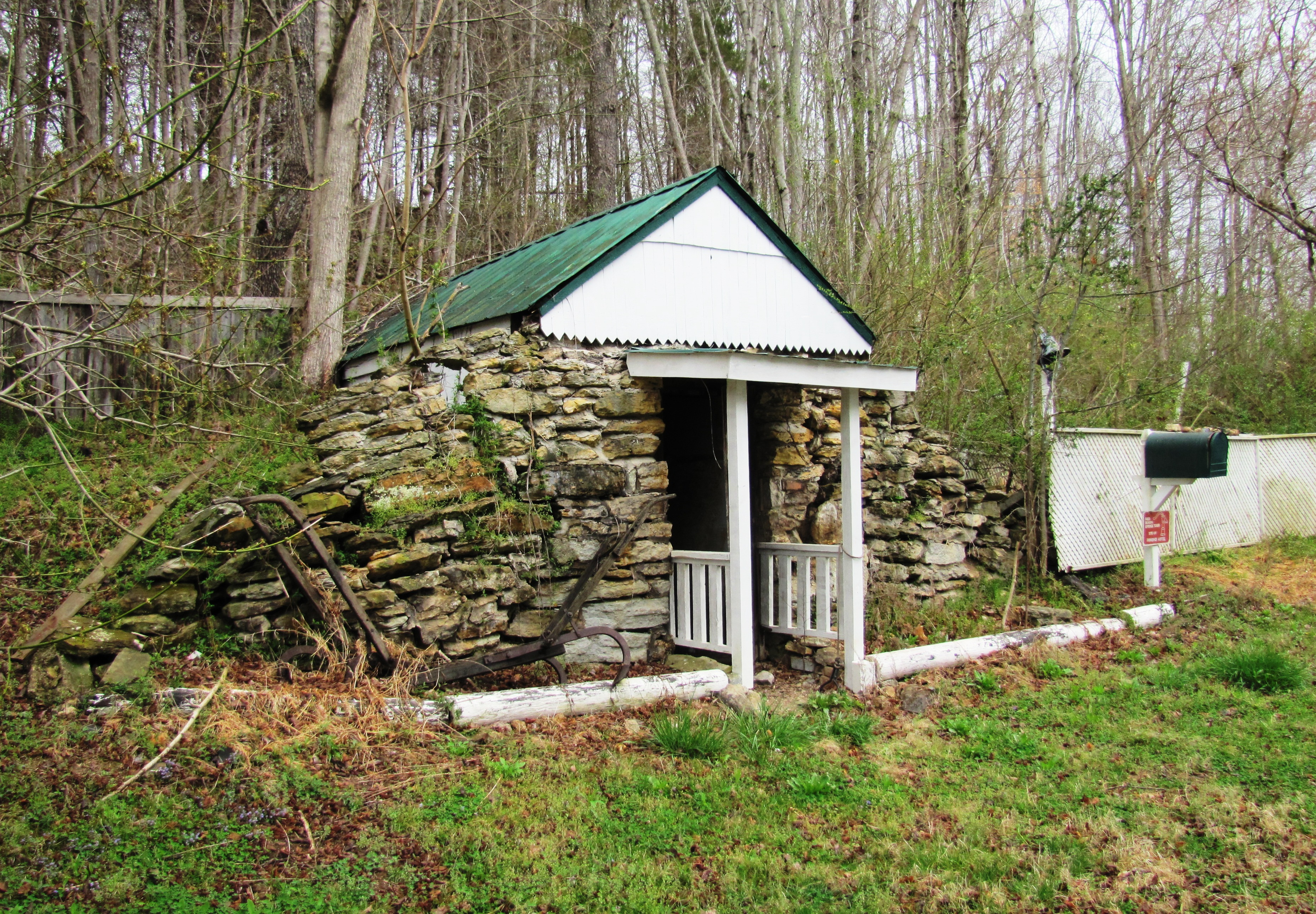
Circa-1890s fruit cellar

The Donoho House, which stands immediately north of the hotel site, was built in 1924 by the Chitwoods for the managers of the hotel. The house is a two-story brick structure with a shingled hip roof and flared eaves. The house has a full-length lower level porch and a short porch on the upper level. The first-floor interior of the house has three dining rooms, a lobby, a kitchen area, and living quarters. The second-floor interior contains five bedrooms. The house is a contributing building in the historic district.

The most historically-notable outbuilding is an 1890s-era fruit cellar, built into the hillside for the property's first hotel. Only the front of the cellar is exposed, and consists of a wooden door flanked by loose river rock. Other outbuildings include a 1916-era washhouse (now a storage shed) and a recently constructed entertainment center, both behind the hotel site. The entertainment center now features music on the weekends with an excellent dj, video games and concessions. The front lawn of the hotel site contains two gazebos (one of which was built over a "Red" water spring) and a covered footbridge over Salt Lick Creek. Of these outbuildings, the fruit cellar and washhouse are considered contributing structures in the historic district.

== 2025 Fire ==
In the early morning hours of November 11, 2025, emergency responders received a call around 7:00 AM CST that the Donoho Hotel was visibly smoking and was on fire. Local fire crews from the Red Boiling Springs Fire Department, Lafayette Fire Department, and the Willette Volunteer Fire Department responded to the scene alongside law enforcement from Red Boiling Springs Police, Macon County Sheriff and the Tennessee Highway Patrol, as well as Macon County EMS all responding to the scene.

By 8:00 AM CST, the structure was nearly fully engulfed in flames from top to bottom. The Donoho Hotel was completely destroyed by the fire, minus a small section of the left wing of the main building - which remained unusable and unsafe after the fire. It is deemed a total loss.
