= Lafayette, Tennessee =

- City
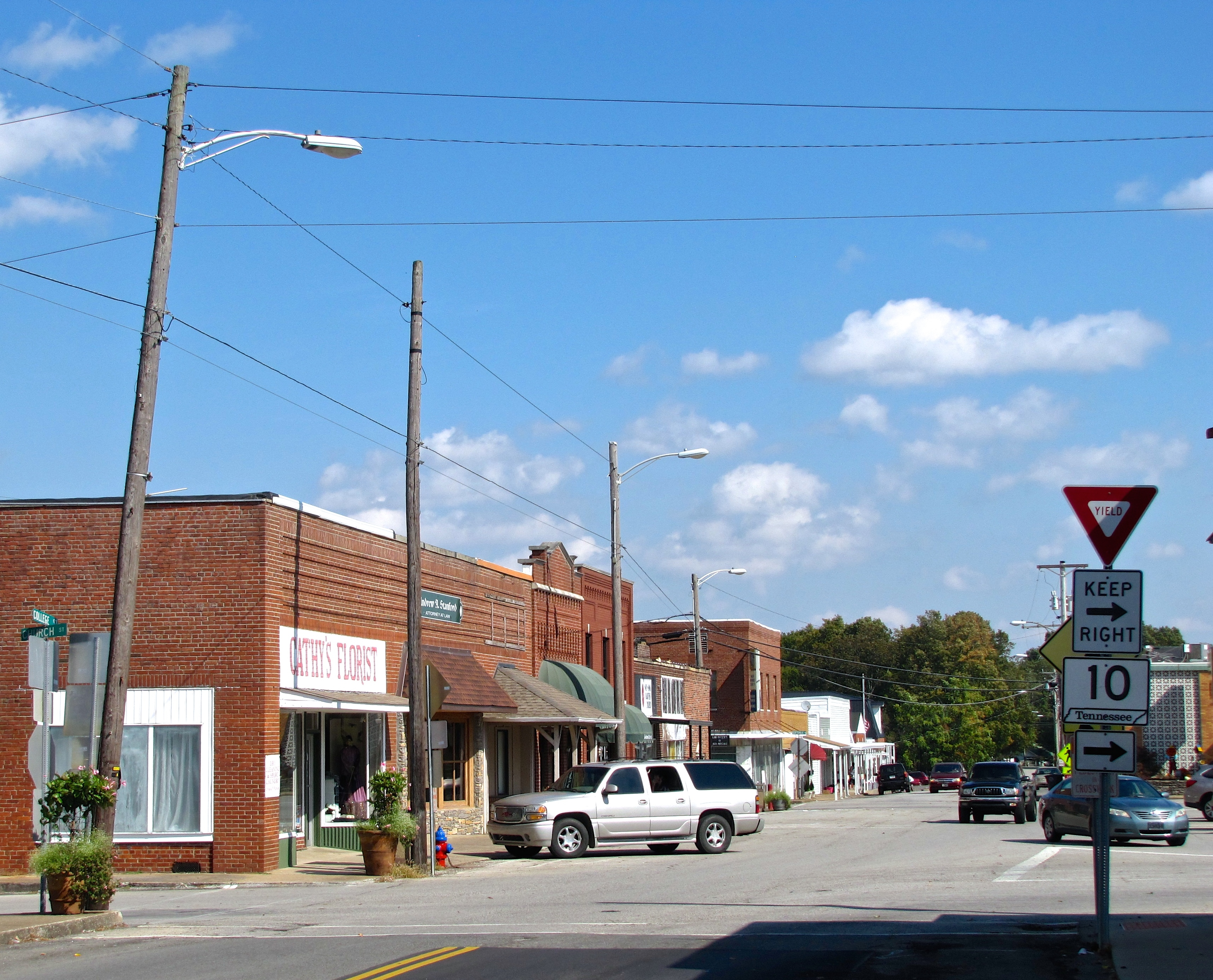
- Buildings on the courthouse square

- Location of Lafayette in Macon County, Tennessee
- Coordinates: 36°31′32″N 86°1′34″W
- Country: United States
- State: Tennessee
- County: Macon

Government
  - Mayor: Tony Day

Area
  - Total: 5.30 sq mi (13.72 km^{2})
  - Land: 5.30 sq mi (13.72 km^{2})
  - Water: 0 sq mi (0.00 km^{2})
- Elevation: 958 ft (292 m)

Population (2020)
  - Total: 5,584
  - Density: 1,053.9/sq mi (406.92/km^{2})
- Time zone: UTC-6 (Central (CST))
  - Summer (DST): UTC-5 (CDT)
- ZIP Code: 37083
- Area code: 615
- FIPS code: 47-40160
- GNIS feature ID: 1290467
- Website: www.lafayette-tn.org

Lafayette /ləˈfeɪɪt/ is a city in and the county seat of Macon County, Tennessee, United States. The population was 4,474 at the 2010 census, and had 5,584 in 2020.

== History ==
Lafayette was founded in 1843 as a county seat for the newly created Macon County. It was named in honor of the Marquis de Lafayette, of Revolutionary War fame.

== Geography ==
Lafayette is located at 36°31′32″N 86°01′34″W. The city is situated near the center of Macon County, along a relatively broad stretch of the northern Highland Rim. Lafayette straddles a divide between the Barren River and Cumberland River, with streams in the northeastern part of the city (including Town Creek) draining into the former, and streams in the southwestern part of the city draining into the latter.

According to the United States Census Bureau, the city has a total area of 4.4 square miles (11 km^{2}), all land.

=== Climate ===
Climate data for Lafayette, Tennessee, 1991–2020 normals, extremes 1958–2019
Month	Jan	Feb	Mar	Apr	May	Jun	Jul	Aug	Sep	Oct	Nov	Dec	Year
Record high °F (°C)	73 (23)	79 (26)	86 (30)	91 (33)	96 (36)	108 (42)	105 (41)	105 (41)	101 (38)	95 (35)	83 (28)	77 (25)	108 (42)
Mean maximum °F (°C)	64.7 (18.2)	69.1 (20.6)	78.2 (25.7)	84.6 (29.2)	88.4 (31.3)	93.8 (34.3)	96.5 (35.8)	96.2 (35.7)	92.2 (33.4)	83.8 (28.8)	76.0 (24.4)	66.6 (19.2)	98.0 (36.7)
Mean daily maximum °F (°C)	44.6 (7.0)	49.5 (9.7)	58.9 (14.9)	69.5 (20.8)	77.8 (25.4)	85.1 (29.5)	88.3 (31.3)	87.9 (31.1)	81.7 (27.6)	71.2 (21.8)	59.2 (15.1)	48.5 (9.2)	68.5 (20.3)
Daily mean °F (°C)	35.7 (2.1)	40.1 (4.5)	48.8 (9.3)	58.6 (14.8)	67.1 (19.5)	75.0 (23.9)	78.6 (25.9)	77.6 (25.3)	70.9 (21.6)	59.7 (15.4)	48.7 (9.3)	39.6 (4.2)	58.4 (14.7)
Mean daily minimum °F (°C)	26.7 (−2.9)	30.7 (−0.7)	38.6 (3.7)	47.7 (8.7)	56.4 (13.6)	65.0 (18.3)	68.8 (20.4)	67.2 (19.6)	60.2 (15.7)	48.2 (9.0)	38.1 (3.4)	30.7 (−0.7)	48.2 (9.0)
Mean minimum °F (°C)	6.1 (−14.4)	11.9 (−11.2)	20.5 (−6.4)	30.6 (−0.8)	42.1 (5.6)	52.9 (11.6)	58.5 (14.7)	56.9 (13.8)	44.5 (6.9)	32.6 (0.3)	23.4 (−4.8)	11.2 (−11.6)	1.5 (−16.9)
Record low °F (°C)	−20 (−29)	−3 (−19)	−1 (−18)	20 (−7)	29 (−2)	38 (3)	45 (7)	45 (7)	31 (−1)	21 (−6)	6 (−14)	−13 (−25)	−20 (−29)
Source 1: NOAA
Source 2: National Weather Service (mean maxima/minima 1981–2010)

== Demographics ==
Historical population
Census	Pop.	Note	%±
1850	210		—
1870	161		—
1890	256		—
1910	678		—
1920	547		−19.3%
1950	1,195		—
1960	1,590		33.1%
1970	2,583		62.5%
1980	3,808		47.4%
1990	3,641		−4.4%
2000	3,885		6.7%
2010	4,474		15.2%
2020	5,584		24.8%

=== 2020 census ===
As of the 2020 census, Lafayette had a population of 5,584. The population density was 1,055.2 people per square mile (343.3/km^{2}).

The median age was 35.6 years; 23.8% of residents were under the age of 18 and 17.7% of residents were 65 years of age or older, while there were 90.6 males for every 100 females and 88.8 males for every 100 females age 18 and over.

96.7% of residents lived in urban areas, while 3.3% lived in rural areas.

There were 2,317 households in Lafayette, of which 31.2% had children under the age of 18 living in them. Of all households, 35.7% were married-couple households, 19.4% were households with a male householder and no spouse or partner present, and 36.1% were households with a female householder and no spouse or partner present. About 35.4% of all households were made up of individuals and 18.0% had someone living alone who was 65 years of age or older.

There were 2,516 housing units, of which 7.9% were vacant. The homeowner vacancy rate was 1.5% and the rental vacancy rate was 5.2%.

Racial composition as of the 2020 census
Race	Number	Percent
White	4,749	85.0%
Black or African American	52	0.9%
American Indian and Alaska Native	23	0.4%
Asian	17	0.3%
Native Hawaiian and Other Pacific Islander	3	0.1%
Some other race	385	6.9%
Two or more races	355	6.4%
Hispanic or Latino (of any race)	665	11.9%

=== Economic Composition ===
Wealth Distribution for Lafayette, TN
Income & Poverty	U.S. Dollars
Median Household Income (in 2021 U.S. Dollars), 2017-2021	$35,580
Per Capita Income in the past 12 months (in 2021 U.S. Dollars), 2017-2021	$19,920
Percentage of Population in Poverty	25.1%

=== 2000 census ===
As of the census of 2000, there was a population of 3,885, with 1,718 households and 1,089 families residing in the city. The population density was 888.4 people per mile^{2} (343.3/km^{2}). There were 1,845 housing units at an average density of 421.9 per square mile (162.9/km^{2}). The racial makeup of the city was 97.89% White, 0.15% African American, 0.33% Native American, 0.39% Asian, 0.26% Pacific Islander, 0.51% from other races, and 0.46% from two or more races. Hispanic or Latino of any race were 2.11% of the population.

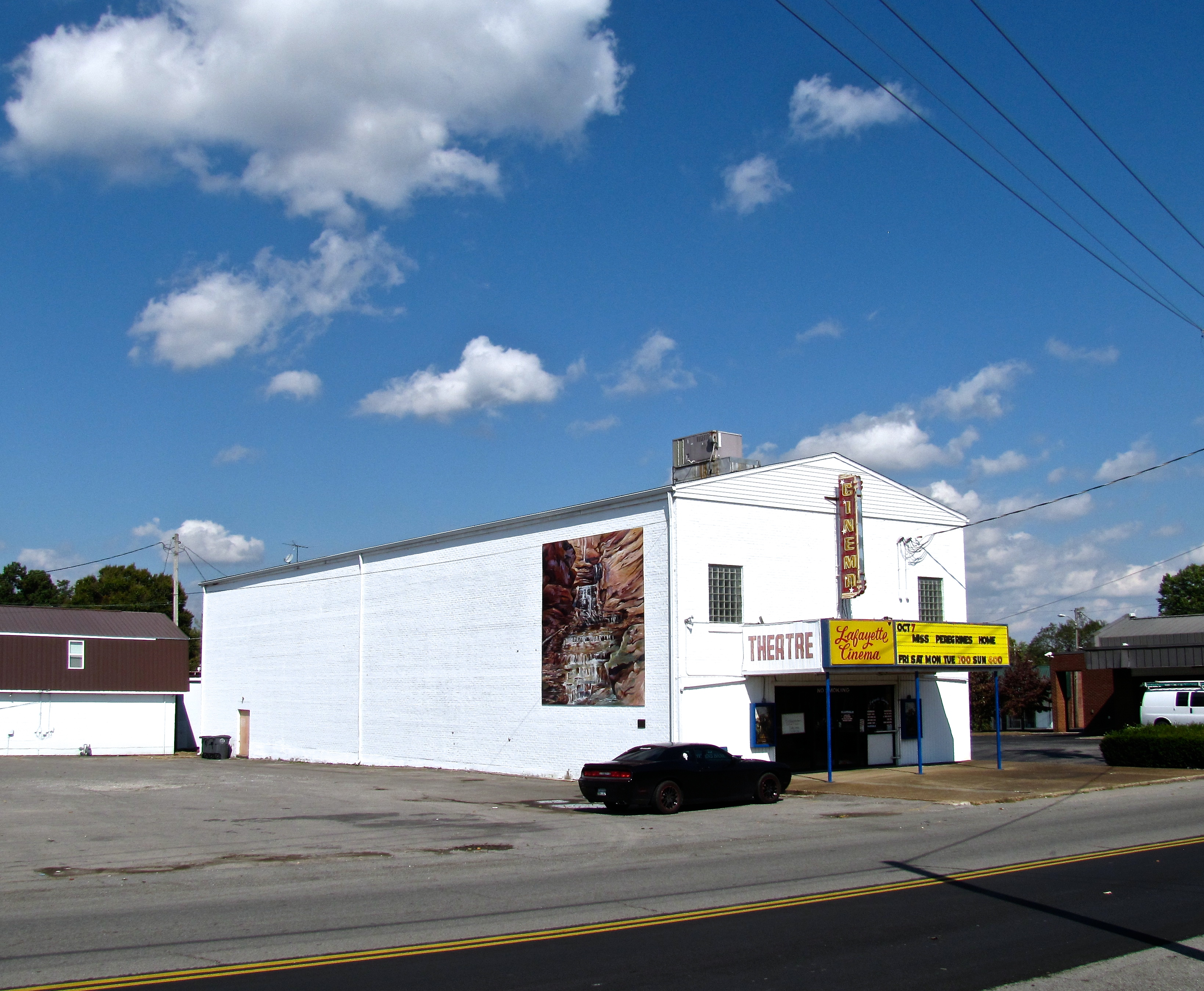
Lafayette Cinema

There were 1,718 households, out of which 26.1% had children under the age of 18 living with them, 49.2% were married couples living together, 10.6% had a female householder with no husband present, and 36.6% were non-families. 34.2% of all households were made up of individuals, and 20.1% had someone living alone who was 65 years of age or older. The average household size was 2.21 and the average family size was 2.79.

In the city, the population was spread out, with 20.6% under the age of 18, 8.4% from 18 to 24, 24.0% from 25 to 44, 25.0% from 45 to 64, and 22.0% who were 65 years of age or older. The median age was 43 years. For every 100 females, there were 84.6 males. For every 100 females age 18 and over, there were 81.2 males.

The median income for a household in the city was $25,750, and the median income for a family was $34,125. Males had a median income of $28,994 versus $19,676 for females. The per capita income for the city was $15,348. About 12.1% of families and 18.0% of the population were below the poverty line, including 23.2% of those under age 18 and 24.2% of those age 65 or over.

== 2008 Tornado ==
On February 5, 2008, at approximately 10:20 p.m., an EF3 tornado touched down near Lafayette and stayed on the ground with a width of approximately 3/4 mile and traveled for nearly 21 miles (34 km), crossing the county in a southwest to northeast direction. The western half of Macon county was devastated by the tornado with a total of 14 confirmed fatalities. Macon County was equipped with tornado warning sirens, however they were not working at the time; despite the efforts of the local news media and the National Weather Service, many residents were unprepared. This tornado devastated many areas including unincorpated communities southwest of town (causing an explosion at the Piedmont Natural gas transfer station) and north of town (in the Akersville community). Then-President George W. Bush visited the tornado-devastated areas of Lafayette on February 8, 2008. As of 2016, some areas still have visible damage.

== Economy ==
The Lafayette and Macon County area is a rural area and its economy mainly relies on the agricultural sector. Macon County is one of the top producers of burley tobacco in Tennessee and the United States. The production of hardwood lumber is also an important industry in the county. There are two local banks with their main offices located in Lafayette. The oldest is Citizens Bank, founded in 1909, and has ten locations in Macon County and surrounding areas. Macon Bank & Trust Co. was founded in 1919 and has seven locations in the area.

Lafayette is home to a few industries. The largest manufacturers in the area are Fleetwood Homes, which is a division of Cavco Industries, Inc., and Tennplasco, which is a division of Manar, Inc.

== Recreation ==
=== Parks ===
- Winding Stairs Park; Winding Stairs Loop is a 1.6 mile moderately trafficked loop trail located near Lafayette, Tennessee that features a waterfall and is rated as moderate. The trail offers a number of activity options.http://winding-stairs.com/
- Key Park – located on Church Street and includes picnic facilities, a playground, a bandstand, walking tracks and Key Park Log House. The Farmer's Market also sets up shop here.
- Lafayette City Park – located on Days Road and includes picnic facilities, a playground, a swimming pool, a volleyball court, tennis courts and a baseball field.

=== Golf ===
- Macon County Golf Course – semi-private, nine-hole course

== Education ==
Lafayette is home to several schools which are run by the Macon County Board of Education. Macon County High School is the high school located in Lafayette, home of the Tigers and Tigerettes. Founded in 1927, the first graduating class consisted of 4 graduates.

=== Public schools ===
- Central Elementary School, 2-3
- Fairlane Elementary School, PK-1
- Lafayette Elementary School, 4-5
- Macon County High School, 9-12
- Macon County Junior High School, 6-8

Other publicly funded schools, located outside of Lafayette, include Westside Elementary (K-5) and Red Boiling Springs School (K-12)

=== Private Schools ===
- Macon Christian Academy, Pre School to 12

== Transportation ==
Lafayette is located at the crossroads of Tennessee Routes 10 and 52. Route 52 is the main thoroughfare in the city, connecting with Interstate 65 approximately 35 miles away, near Portland. Other secondary state highways include Tennessee State Route 261 and Tennessee State Route 262.

Sneed Boulevard is used as a bypass that connects Route 52 to the Lafayette Industrial Park, which is located in the northern section of the city.

=== Airport ===
Located two miles west of downtown, air service in Lafayette is provided by Lafayette Municipal Airport. The facility includes a runway with dimensions of 5,200 by 75 feet.

== Notable people ==
- John Washington Butler, state legislator
- Hillous Butrum - country music guitarist
- Rita Coolidge - American singer/songwriter
- Cal Turner Sr. - co-founder of Dollar General
- J. L. Turner - co-founder of Dollar General
- Nera White - first woman inducted into the Naismith Memorial Basketball Hall of Fame
- Jett Williams - country music singer
